= 2007 in Nordic music =

The following is a list of notable events and releases that happened in Nordic music in 2007.

== Events ==
- 30 March – On the first day of the 34th Vossajazz at Vossavangen, Norway, Snorre Bjerck is awarded the Vossajazzprisen 2007.
- April – As Dark Funeral plan a tour of the Baltic states, drummer Matte Modin refuses to travel there; the tour is cancelled, he is sacked by the band, to be replaced by Nils Fjellström.
- 12 May – The final of the 52nd Eurovision Song Contest takes place in Helsinki, and is won by Serbia. Host country Finland, represented by Hanna Pakarinen, finish in 17th place, and Sweden, represented by The Ark in 18th. Norway Guri Schanke, Denmark (DQ and Iceland (Eiríkur Hauksson) are all eliminated at the semi-final stage.
- 24 May – Anette Olzon is announced as the new vocalist of Nightwish, replacing Tarja Turunen
- 10 September – Keyboardist Meiju Enho leaves Finnish band Ensiferum.
- 11 December – The Nobel Peace Prize Concert takes place at the Telenor Arena in Oslo, with appearances from Morten Harket, Tine Thing Helseth, Kylie Minogue and others.

== Classical works ==
- Kalevi Aho – Oboe Concerto
- Ylva Arkvik – Barnet och de grå (opera)
- Håkon Berge – Fine Thing:concertino for trumpet and organ
- Svante Henryson – Vinterfest concert overture for orchestra
- Esa-Pekka Salonen – Piano Concerto

== Musical theatre ==
- 10 June – Matador, with music by Bent Fabricius-Bjerre and lyrics by Clemens Telling) opens at the Copenhagen Opera House.

== Major hit singles ==
- Alphabeat – "10.000 Nights of Thunder" (#1 Denmark)
- Tone Damli – "Fever" (#6 Norway)
- Per Gessle – "En händig man" (#1 Sweden)
- Carola Häggkvist – "I denna natt blir världen ny" (#41 Sweden)
- Laleh – "Snö" (#14 Sweden)
- Hanna Pakarinen – "Leave Me Alone" (#8 Sweden, #11 Finland)
- Rednex – "Anyway You Want Me" (#8 Sweden)
- Turisas – "To Holmgard and Beyond" (#12 Finland)
- Jenni Vartiainen – "Ihmisten edessä" (#2 Finland)
- Måns Zelmerlöw – "Cara Mia"(#1 in Sweden, #4 in Finland)

== Film and television music ==
- Tuomas Kantelinen – Arn: The Knight Templar

== Albums released ==
=== January ===
Day	Artist	Album	Label	Notes	Ref.
10	Moonsorrow	Viides luku – Hävitetty	Spinefarm Records	Consists of two 25-minute tracks	
22	Pain of Salvation	Scarsick	InsideOut Music	Concept album	
29	Dag Arnesen Trio	Norwegian Song	Resonant Music		

=== February ===
Day	Artist	Album	Label	Notes	Ref.
19	Watain	Sworn to the Dark	Season of Mist	Dedicated to Jon Nödtveidt who died in 2006	
23	Sirenia	Nine Destinies and a Downfall	Nuclear Blast Records	Only album to feature Monika Pedersen	

=== March ===
Day	Artist	Album	Label	Notes	Ref.
12	Nightrage	A New Disease Is Born	Lifeforce Records	Only album to feature Jimmie Strimell on vocals	
23	Ensiferum	Victory Songs	Spinefarm Records	First album to feature Petri Lindroos on vocals	
28	Finntroll	Ur jordens djup	Spinefarm	First album to feature Mathias Lillmåns on vocals	

=== April ===
Day	Artist	Album	Label	Notes	Ref.
23	Sirenia	Nine Destinies and a Downfall	Nuclear Blast Records	Only album to feature Monika Pedersen	
27	Hatesphere	Serpent Smiles and Killer Eyes	Steamhammer		

=== May ===
Day	Artist	Album	Label	Notes	Ref.
7	Twilightning	Swinelords	Spinefarm Records	Final studio album	
18	Sonic Syndicate	Only Inhuman	Nuclear Blast	First album on Nuclear Blast label	

=== June ===
Day	Artist	Album	Label	Notes	Ref.
22	Candlemass	King of the Grey Islands	Nuclear Blast Records	First album after the departure of Messiah Marcolin	
25	Entombed	Serpent Saints: The Ten Amendments	Candlelight		
26	Korpiklaani	Tervaskanto	Napalm Records		

=== July ===
Day	Artist	Album	Label	Notes	Ref.
27	Clawfinger	Life Will Kill You	Nuclear Blast	Last album before the band breakup in 2013	

=== August ===
Day	Artist	Album	Label	Notes	Ref.
20	Susanna and the Magical Orchestra	Sonata Mix Dwarf Cosmos	Rune Grammofon	Featured musicians include Susanna's husband Helge Sten	
22	Dimension Zero	He Who Shall Not Bleed			

=== September ===
Day	Artist	Album	Label	Notes	Ref.
4	Aeon	Rise to Dominate	Metal Blade Records		
14	Astral Doors	New Revelation	Locomotive Records		
24	Eivind Aarset	Sonic Codex	Jazzland Recordings	Featuring Audun Erlien	

=== October ===
Day	Artist	Album	Label	Notes	Ref.
15	Ava Inferi	The Silhouette	Season of Mist		
17	Kent	Tillbaka till samtiden	RCA Records/Sony BMG	#1 in Sweden, #2 in Norway, #3 in Finland, #5 in Denmark	

=== November ===
Day	Artist	Album	Label	Notes	Ref.
5	Opeth	The Roundhouse Tapes	Peaceville Records	Live album	
19	Tarja Turunen	My Winter Storm	Edel		

== Deaths ==
- 31 January – Kirka Babitzin, Finnish singer (born 1950); aortic aneurysm)
- 1 March – Otto Brandenburg, Danish rock and roll singer and actor (born 1934)
- 29 March – Regin Dahl, Faroese author and composer (born 1918)
- 30 April – Eeki Mantere, Finnish musician (born 1949)
- 24 June – Natasja, Danish reggae singer (born 1974); car accident)
- 12 July – Robert Burås, Norwegian rock guitarist and songwriter of Madrugada (born 1975)
- 23 August – Martti Pokela, Finnish folk musician, kantele player and composer (born 1924)
- 10 September (approximate date) – Thomas Hansen, Norwegian musician (born 1976; drug-related)
- 16 November – Grethe Kausland, Norwegian singer (born 1947; lung cancer)
- 31 December – Markku Peltola, Finnish actor and musician (born 1956)
