= Ailyn =

Spanish singer (born 1982)

Ailyn Giménez
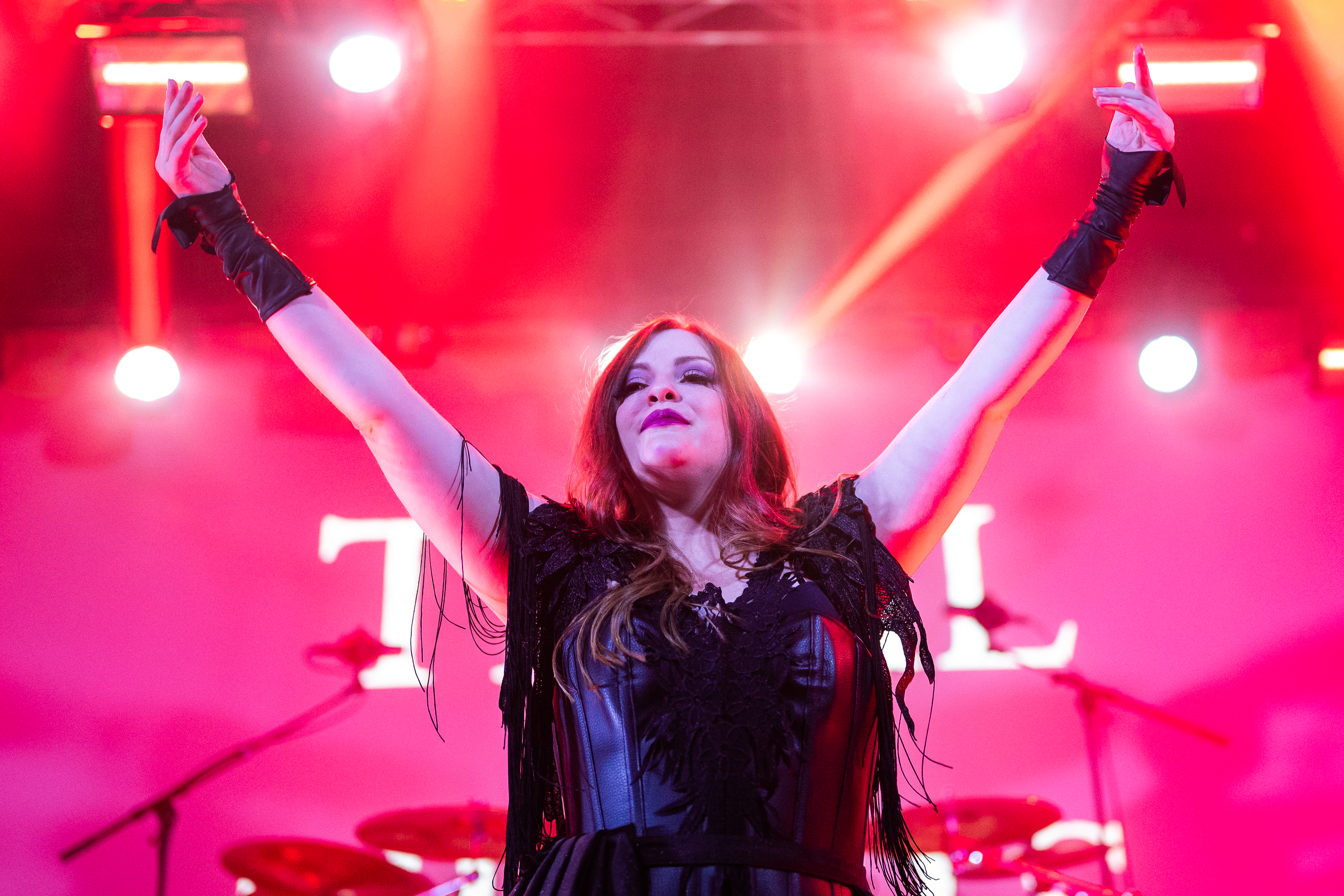
- Ailyn with Trail of Tears in 2025

Background information
- Born: Pilar María Del Carmen Mónica Giménez García; 29 May 1982 (age 44); Esplugues de Llobregat, Catalonia, Spain
- Genres: Gothic metal; symphonic metal; pop
- Occupations: Singer, songwriter
- Years active: 2002–present
- Member of: Her Chariot Awaits; Trail of Tears
- Formerly of: Sirenia

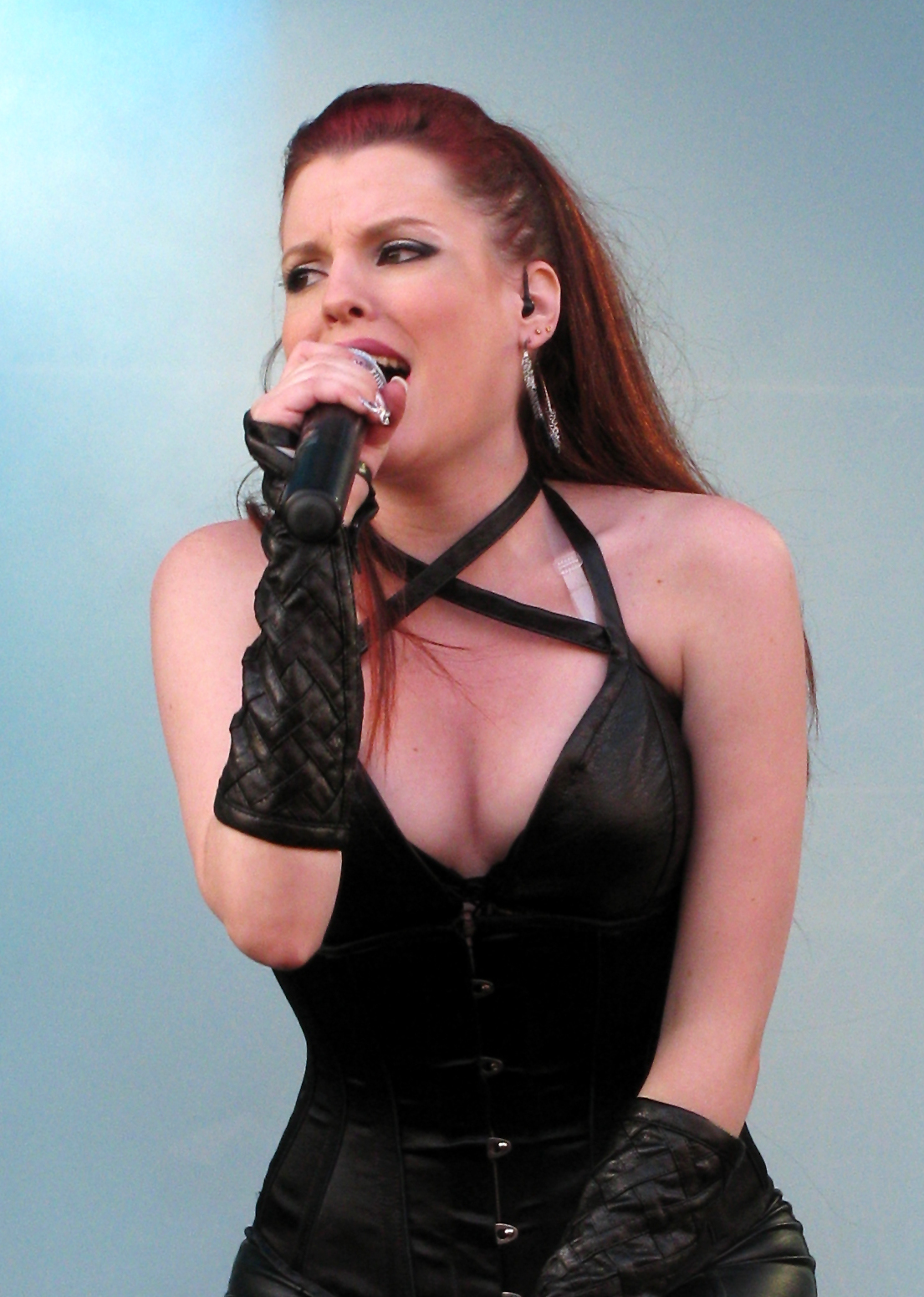
Ailyn with Sirenia in 2010

Pilar María Del Carmen Mónica Giménez García (born 29 May 1982), known professionally as Ailyn Giménez or simply Ailyn, is a Spanish singer. She is the current vocalist of Her Chariot Awaits and Trail of Tears, and the former vocalist of the Norwegian gothic metal band Sirenia.

Whilst in Sirenia, Ailyn was the fourth singer and sung on more full Sirenia albums than any other singer to date. In 2020, she joined the reformed Trail of Tears.

Before joining Sirenia, Ailyn was one of the contestants on series 1 of Spain's version of The X Factor in 2007, and was eliminated in the fourth episode.

== Early life ==
Ailyn's musical career started at the age of 15, when she studied solfege and classical singing at The Albéniz School of Music.

Her professional debut was in 2002 in Cornellà de Llobregat, in an annual benefit fashion show the city held to raise money for Alzheimer's sufferers.

Her first discographic contract was as part of the group Charm (a female vocal trio that played Japanese music). After their first album titled Konnichiwa released in 2003, she wanted to try her luck as a solo artist, so she began recording tracks on her own. In 2004, after completing some tunes for the Kimagure Orange Road anime series, she left the group.

== Career ==
=== Solo ===
In September 2005, Ailyn was a contestant representing Spain in the International Pop Music Festival "Canzoni Dal Mondo", being among the 10 finalists. In October, she got the "Silver Tabaiba" to the Best Performance in the 5th Edition of the International Song Festival in the Canary Islands. In November, she got the "Gold Tabaiba" to the Best Singer of a Published Song, in the 6th Edition of the International Song Festival in the Canary Islands. The song, "Puedo Sentir", was originally sung by Lena Park (Fall in Love).

In May 2007, she was selected as a member of the young team in the Spanish version of X Factor, where she sang "Time After Time", "Moonlight Shadow", "Bring Me to Life", and "Why". She was eliminated in the fourth episode.

=== With Sirenia (2008–2016) ===
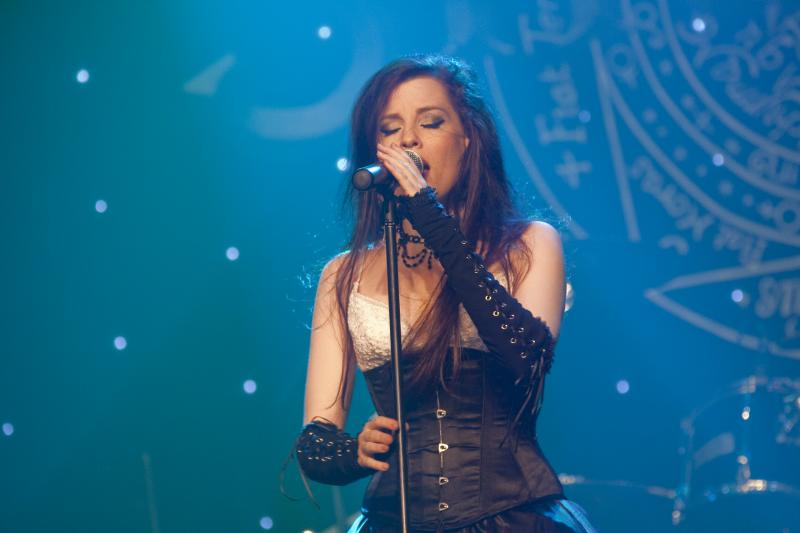
Ailyn singing at a Sirenia concert

On 9 April 2008, it was announced that Ailyn was chosen as the fourth singer of Sirenia out of over 500 women.

"I got selected as Sirenia's new vocalist as an accident. My sister added them to my Myspace's friends, but we didn't realize that if you wanted to audition for the band you had to send them your demo or add them as friends, so I was shocked when they wrote to me asking to go to Norway and audition for the new vocalist. I went there twice, the first time was a studio audition and the second one with all the band members. I think I was selected because I'm what Morten was looking for the band, and also since the first moment we connected all the members from Sirenia and me."

She was featured on Sirenia's fourth album The 13th Floor, which was released on 23 January 2009.

Sirenia's fifth album The Enigma of Life, was released on 21 January 2011. This made her the only singer who recorded two full-length albums with Sirenia, since Henriette Bordvik only performed vocals on one album, An Elixir for Existence and one EP, Sirenian Shores.

In July 2013, Sirenia released their sixth album Perils of the Deep Blue.

On 3 April 2014, the band announced they had returned to Napalm Records with a pending album release for early 2015.

The Seventh Life Path, Sirenia's seventh album was released on 8 May 2016.

On 5 July 2016, it was announced via the band's website that Sirenia and Ailyn were amicably separating "for personal reasons", and that the name of the new singer would be announced on 8 September 2016, ahead of the November release of their new album Dim Days of Dolor. The same day, Ailyn stated on her Facebook that she did not make the decision. Her replacement in Sirenia was the French mezzo-soprano singer Emmanuelle Zoldan.

Ailyn recorded four albums in eight years with Sirenia. Until the 2018 release of Arcane Astral Aeons, she was the only Sirenia singer to sing on more than one full Sirenia album. During her stay in Sirenia she also sang some Japanese and Spanish versions of the band's songs, drawing from her previous experiences singing in those languages.

=== Her Chariot Awaits (2020–present) ===
In 2020, Ailyn announced her collaboration with Adrenaline Mob guitarist Mike Orlando in a new project called Her Chariot Awaits. Their self titled debut album was scheduled for release on 10 April 2020, but was delayed due to the COVID-19 pandemic and released on 22 May 2020.

=== Trail of Tears (2020–present) ===
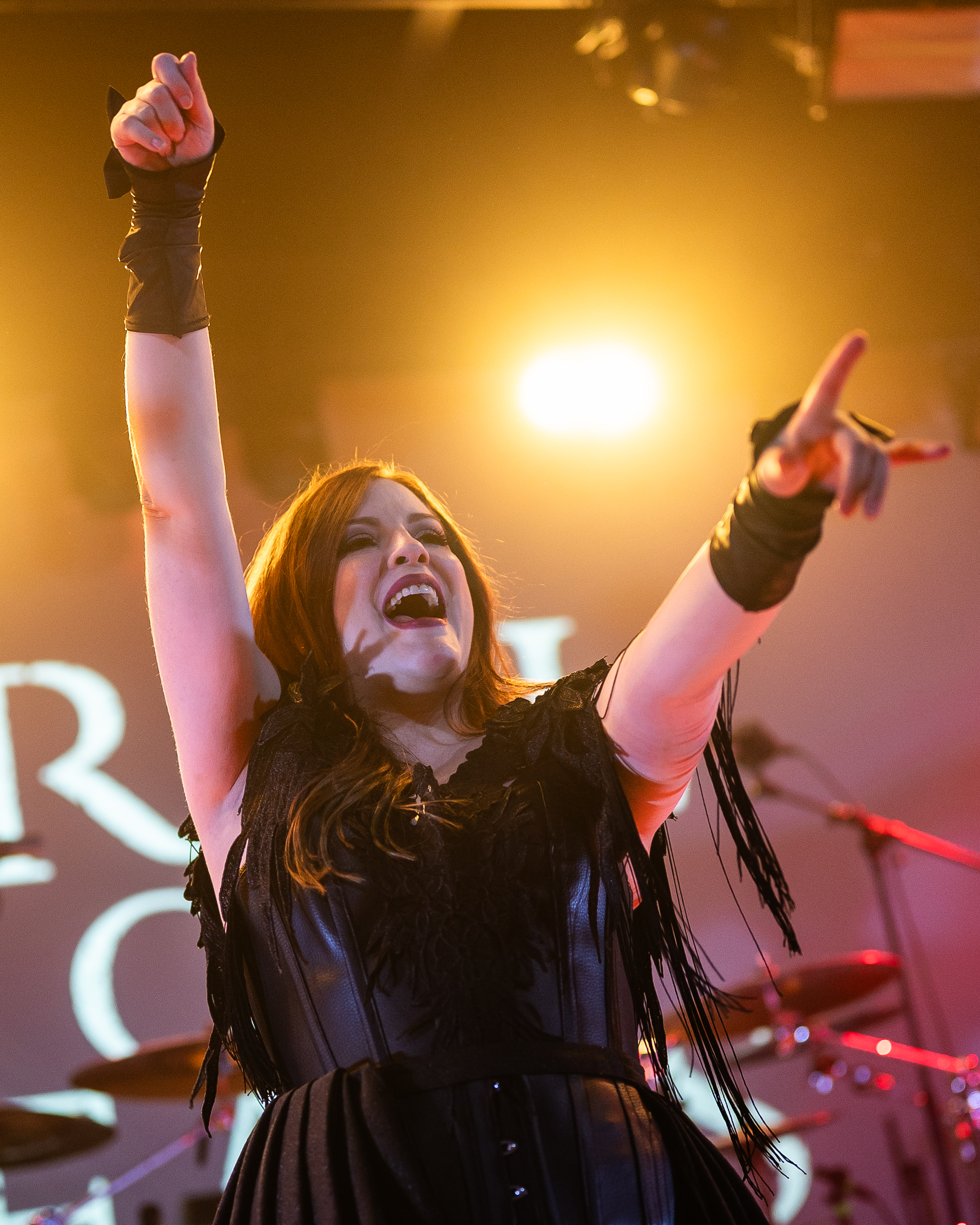
With Trail of Tears in 2025

When Norwegian gothic metal band Trail of Tears resurfaced seven years after their 2013 disbanding, it was with Ailyn as their female vocalist. Due to the pandemic, they were off for a rough start with Ailyn stranded in Spain, but they have since played a few festivals and released the EP Winds of Disdain (2024).

=== Lunarian ===
In 2022, a collaboration with Secret Sphere's guitarist Aldo Lonobile named Lunarian was announced. The debut album entitled Burn The Beauty was released on September 9 that year, with videos for the singles "Dream Catcher" and "Endless Sleep" released.

=== Other works ===
In 2011, Ailyn contributed to Austrian power metal band Serenity's album Death & Legacy, singing on the songs "The Chevalier" and "Prayer". She is also featured in the video "The Chevalier".

In 2014, she collaborated with several other bands, such as Spanish symphonic metal band Diabulus in Musica, for whom she contributed vocals to the song "Furia de Libertad" from their album Argia. The Greek symphonic metal band Enemy of Reality featured her in the song "Needle Bites" and its music video, from their album Rejected Gods. She performed live with German/Norwegian symphonic metal band Leaves' Eyes at their 10th anniversary show in Wieze, Belgium.

Ailyn is mentioned in the booklet of the Dutch metal band The Gentle Storm's album The Diary for useful advice she gave regarding the band's "Shores of India" music video.

Ailyn participated on two albums by the metal opera project Melted Space; The Great Lie (2015) and Darkening Light (2018).

In 2017, Ailyn announced her collaboration with Italian metal band Secret Rule: She will be featured on their upcoming album The Key to the World and in a music video. She also hinted that there are some more collaborations to be announced. She is also composing music for her solo project but does not want to rush this process.

== Personal life ==
Ailyn has heterochromia iridis, her right eye is brown, her left one is green. She has Type 1 diabetes since the age of 7 and has struggled with depression. She currently lives in Norway.

== Discography ==
=== Trail of Tears ===
==== Studio albums ====
- Winds of Disdain (EP, 2024)

=== Lunarian ===
Studio albums:

- Burn the Beauty (2022)

=== Her Chariot Awaits ===
Studio albums:

- Her Chariot Awaits (2020)

=== Sirenia ===
Studio albums:

- The 13th Floor (2009)
- The Enigma of Life (2011)
- Perils of the Deep Blue (2013)
- The Seventh Life Path (2015)
