= Mortemia =

Norwegian gothic metal band

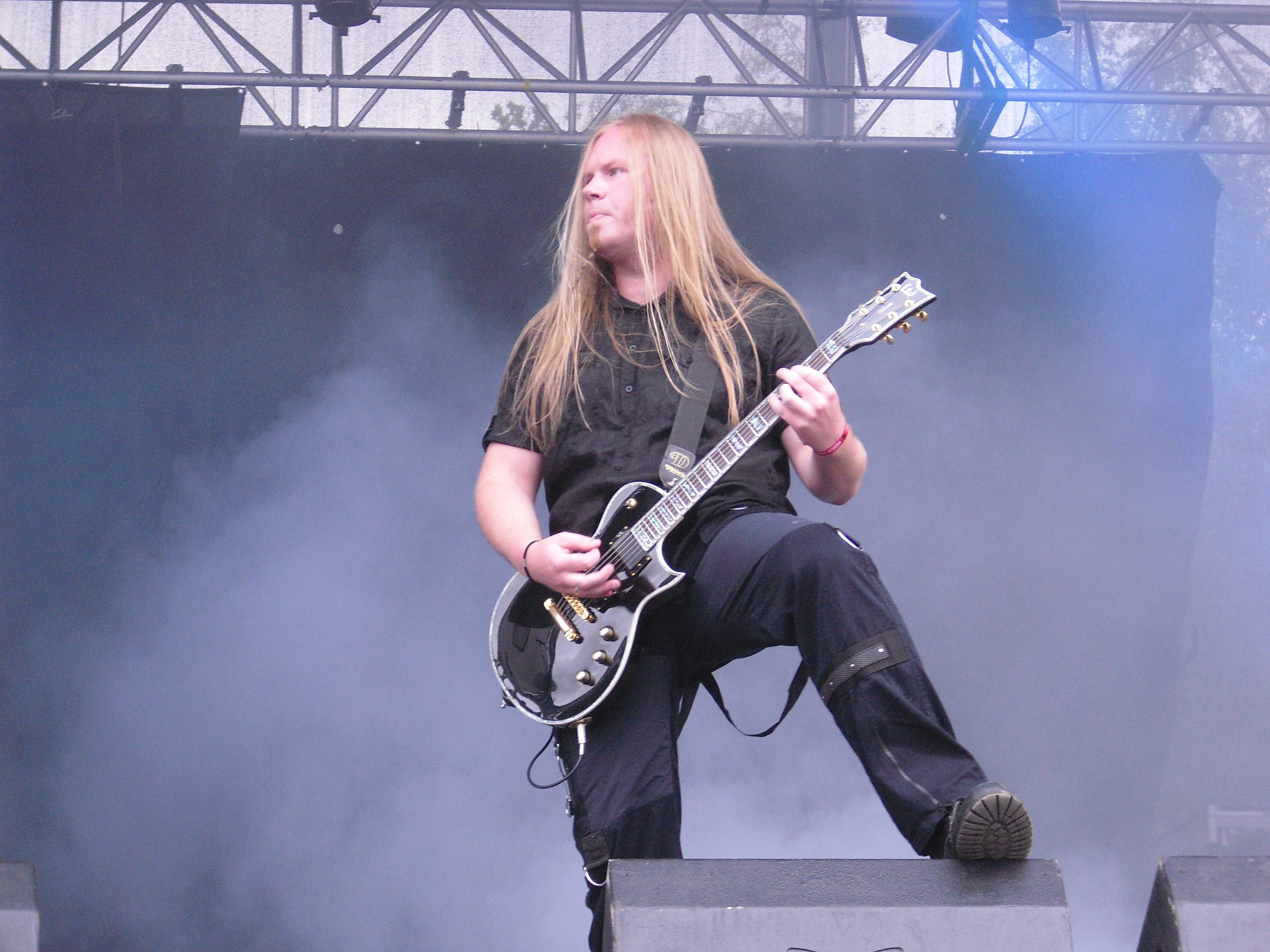
- Morten Veland performing in 2009

Background information
- Origin: Stavanger, Norway
- Genre: Gothic metal
- Years active: 2009–2010, 2021–present
- Label: Independent
- Members: Morten Veland
- Website: Mortemia on Facebook

Mortemia is a one-man Norwegian gothic metal band formed in 2009 by Morten Veland, founder of Tristania and Sirenia.

== History ==
=== 2009–2010: Misere Mortem ===
The band's first album, titled Misere Mortem, was released in February 2010 via Napalm Records. A song from the album, "The One I Once Was", was made available on the band's MySpace page on 17 January 2010. The album was recorded at Veland's Audio Avenue Studios in Stavanger, Norway and Sound Suite Studios in France. It was produced, engineered and mixed by Veland himself.

=== 2021–2022: Veland Music and The Pandemic Pandemonium Sessions ===
On 20 April 2021, it was announced that Mortemia would release a series of new songs as part of the EP The Pandemic Pandemonium Sessions, through Morten Veland's new record label, called Veland Music, for digital download. The musical concept is more melodic and diverse than the previous album, featuring several female guest vocalists in each song instead of the characteristic symphonic choir.

The first one, called "The Enigmatic Sequel", which features Madeleine Liljestam from the Swedish symphonic metal band Eleine, came out on 14 May 2021. The second one, called "Death Turns a Blind Eye", which features Marcela Bovio from the Dutch symphonic death metal band MaYaN, came out on 18 June 2021. A third song titled, "The Hour of Wrath", which features Alessia Scolletti from the Italian power metal band Temperance was released on 23 July 2021. On 10 September 2021, Mortemia released a fourth song called "Decadence Deepens Within", featuring Liv Kristine. On 8 October, the fifth track "Devastation Bound" featuring Melissa Bonny from the Swiss symphonic metal band Ad Infinitum was released. On 10 December 2021, the sixth track "My Demons and I" with Brittney Slayes from the Canadian power metal band Unleash the Archers was released. On 29 January 2022, the seventh track "Here Comes Winter" with Maja Shining from the Danish alternative metal band Forever Still was released.

=== 2022–2025: The Covid Aftermath Sessions ===
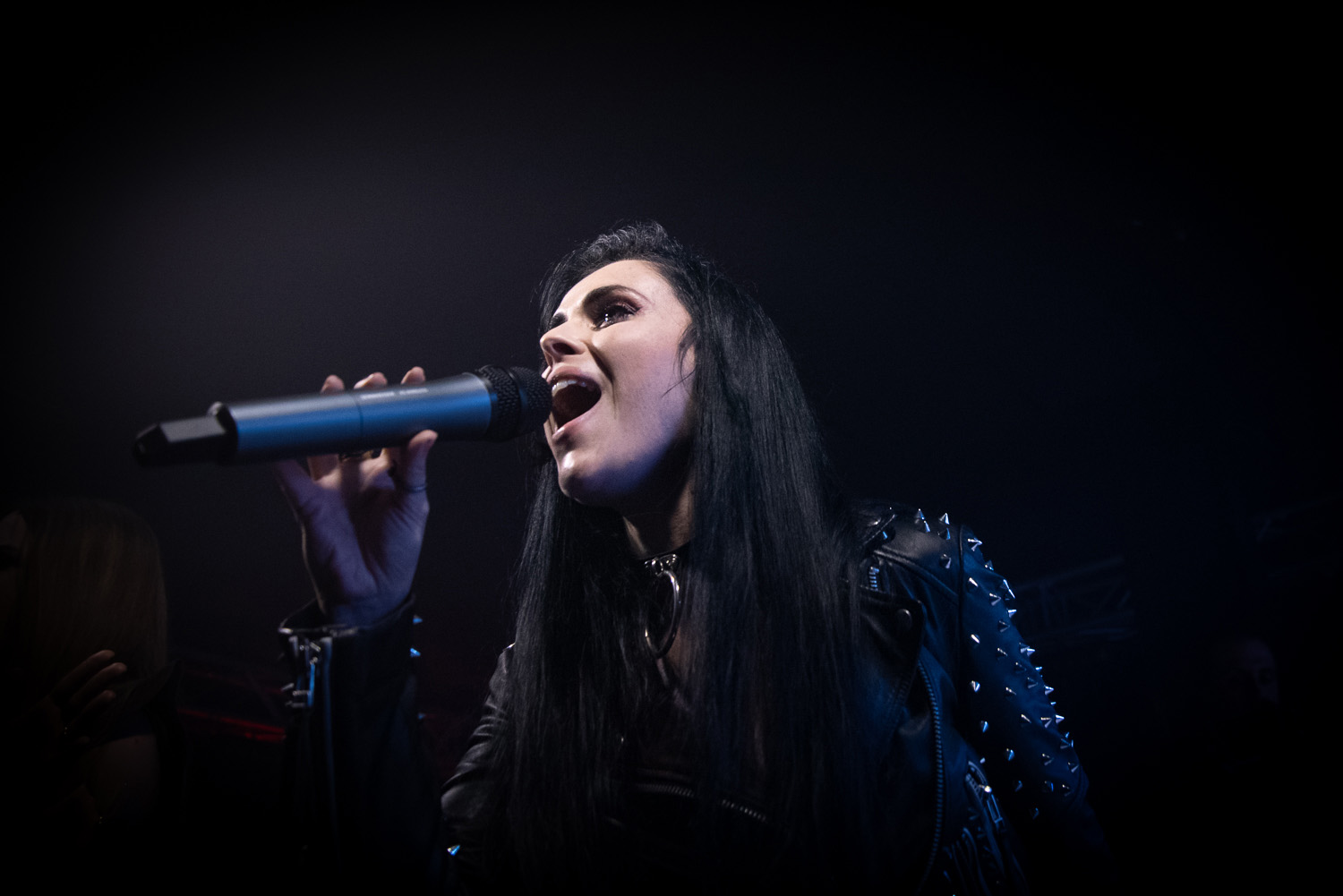
Federica Lanna from Volturian recorded "Frozen" with Mortemia

On 9 December 2022, Mortemia released a cover version of Madonna's "Frozen", with Federica Lanna from Italian symphonic metal band Volturian on vocals. He explained: "Me and Federica did an awesome version of the song together, and I feel that this song also fits a symphonic metal arrangement very well. The original version is very dark and melancholic, so it made perfect sense to me to do a cover version of it. Federica has a really beautiful and expressive voice that fits perfectly for this track. I feel truly privileged and thankful to have Federica on board this project, and I am really pleased to be sharing this song with you all. Frozen is a great way to open the brand new project "The Covid Aftermath Sessions.""

On 31 March 2023, Mortemia released their second song from "The Covid Aftermath Sessions" project, "The Endless Shore", featuring Ulli Perhonen on guest vocals and Nils Courbaron on solo guitar.

== Members ==
- Morten Veland – vocals, all instruments, production, engineering, mixing

== Discography ==
=== Studio albums ===
- Misere Mortem (2010)
- The Pandemic Pandemonium Sessions (2022)
- The Covid Aftermath Sessions (2025)
- The Cover Collab Sessions (2026)
