= The Seventh Life Path =

Studio album by Sirenia
- Released: May 8, 2015
- Recorded: February–March 2015
- Studios: Audio Avenue (Tau, Norway); Sound Suite (Marseille, France)
- Genres: Gothic metal; symphonic metal; doom metal
- Length: 67:54
- Languages: English; Spanish; Japanese
- Label: Napalm
- Producer: Morten Veland

Sirenia chronology
Perils of the Deep Blue (2013)	The Seventh Life Path (2015)	Dim Days of Dolor (2016)

Singles from The Seventh Life Path
- 1. "Once My Light" Released: April 8, 2015

The Seventh Life Path is the seventh studio album by the Norwegian gothic metal band Sirenia. It was released on May 8 in Europe, May 11 in the United Kingdom and May 12, 2015 in North America through Napalm Records. This was the first Sirenia record released by the Austrian record company since An Elixir for Existence. It is their last album featuring longtime Spanish female vocalist Ailyn.

== Reception ==
Rock Hard gave the album a 6.5 out of 10 score. Norway's Scream Magazine scored the album 4 out of 6. The album was a "tough nut to crack", and needed time to get "under the skin". With time, the album would provide "some great experiences", but some tracks fell a little flat. "Too much cheese", wrote Trønder-Avisa, where The Seventh Life Path only received 2 out of 6 points. Likening the alabum to a food recipe, Sirenia used an overload of ingredients, and even one single song became "unnecessarily massive" to the ears.

== Cover art ==
Sirenia contacted renowned artist Gyula Havancsák of Hjules Illustration and Design to illustrate the cover for their newest album.

"I got some instructions from the band for the making of this cover artwork. They wanted the character of death standing behind a white dressed woman. My first thought was: How can I show a beautiful girl without face? How can I avoid to show a girl face? Well, I draw a white hood on her face, with crochet part in front of her eyes. This part looks like as a big eye that watches the fate of humans. She pull a life thread, but this one soul is lost. We can see this line (could be silver for example) change to disgusting muddy brown between her fingers...and this thread runs into a hourglass..., it falls down in the sand."

Regarding the other symbols in the cover art, Gyula mentions that the band:

"...wanted to see some roots and tree branches on the cover and the scythe that looks as the number 7 and a mountain with a path in the background. The mountain symbolizes life, the top of the mountain is the end of life. The highest point where you can look back your whole life. This is the meaning of the flexous path... The 7 number appears as 7 ravens, 7 snakes, 7 roses on the dried out wreath..."

== Track listing ==
All tracks are written by Morten Veland.

No.	Title	Note(s)	Length
1.	"Seti"	Instrumental with choral vocals	2:05
2.	"Serpent"		6:31
3.	"Once My Light"		7:21
4.	"Elixir" (featuring Joakim Næss)		5:45
5.	"Sons of the North"		8:16
6.	"Earendel"		6:14
7.	"Concealed Disdain"		6:11
8.	"Insania"		6:39
9.	"Contemptuous Quietus"		6:29
10.	"The Silver Eye"		7:29
11.	"Tragedienne"		4:54
Total length:			67:54

Limited edition bonus track
No.	Title	Length
12.	"Trágica" (Spanish version of "Tragedienne")	4:55
Total length:		72:49

Japanese bonus track
No.	Title	Length
13.	"Tragedienne" (Japanese version of "Tragedienne")	4:53
Total length:		77:42

== Personnel ==
=== Sirenia ===
- Morten Veland – vocals, all other instruments
- Ailyn – vocals

=== Session musicians ===
- Joakim Næss – clean male vocals on "Elixir"
- Damien Surian, Mathieu Landry, Emmanuelle Zoldan and Emilie Bernou – The Sirenian Choir

== Additional notes ==
- Spanish translation on "Tragedienne" by Ailyn
- "The Seventh Life Path" was recorded in Audio Avenue Studios (Tau, Norway), additional recordings were done in Sound Suite Studios (Marseille, France)
- Produced and engineered by Morten Veland
- Pre-produced in Audio Avenue Studios (Tau, Norway)
- Mixed and mastered by Endre Kirkesola at dUb studios (Oslo, Norway)
- Cover artwork, design and layout by Gyula Havancsák
- Band photos by Fotograf Tom Knudsen

== Charts ==
Chart (2015)	Peak position
Belgian Albums Chart (Flanders)	198
Belgian Albums Chart (Wallonia)	122
German Albums Chart	68
Swiss Albums Chart	77
US Heatseeker Albums	18
