= The Pandemic Pandemonium Sessions =

EP by Mortemia
- Released: 2021–2022
- Recorded: Audio Avenue Studio, Stavanger, Norway
- Genre: Gothic metal
- Length: 55:07
- Label: Veland Music
- Producer: Morten Veland

Mortemia chronology
Misere Mortem (2010)	The Pandemic Pandemonium Sessions (2021)

The Pandemic Pandemonium Sessions are a digital download collection of singles by the Norwegian gothic metal one-man band Mortemia. The singles have been released through 2021 and 2022. Unlike Mortemia's first album, Misere Mortem, these singles have a more melodic and diverse musical concept. There is a female guest vocalist in each song instead of the characteristic symphonic choir.

== Track listing ==
All tracks are written by Morten Veland, except where noted.

No.	Title	Writer(s)	Release date	Length
1.	"The Enigmatic Sequel"		May 14, 2021	4:09
2.	"Death Turns a Blind Eye"		June 18, 2021	5:32
3.	"The Hour of Wrath"		July 23, 2021	3:45
4.	"Decadence Deepens Within"		September 10, 2021	5:03
5.	"Devastation Bound"		October 8, 2021	4:35
6.	"My Demons and I"		December 10, 2021	4:16
7.	"Here Comes Winter"		January 29, 2022	4:20
8.	"Lost Horizon"		March 7, 2022	3:49
9.	"Veiled in Despair"		May 6, 2022	6:12
10.	"What Else Is There?" (Röyksopp cover)	Tony Macaulay, Svein Berge, Torbjorn Brundtland, Olof Dreijer, Danny Shoshan, Robb Huxley, Karin Dreijer, Roger Greenaway & Roger John	June 17, 2022	3:47
11.	"Forever and Beyond"		August 26, 2022	4:19
12.	"Adrenalize"		October 7, 2022	5:16
Total length:				55:07

== Personnel ==
=== Mortemia ===
- Morten Veland – vocals, all instruments, production, engineering, mixing

=== Additional personnel and staff ===
- Madeleine Liljestam – female vocals (track 1)
- Marcela Bovio – female vocals (track 2)
- Alessia Scolletti – female vocals (track 3)
- Liv Kristine – female vocals (track 4)
- Melissa Bonny – female vocals (track 5)
- Brittney Slayes – female vocals (track 6)
- Maja Maja Shining – female vocals (track 7)
- Erica Ohlsson – female vocals (track 8)
- Heidi Parviainen – female vocals (track 9)
- Zora Cock – female vocals (track 10)
- Linda Toni Grahn – female vocals (track 11)
- Caterina Nix – female vocals (track 12)
