= The 13th Floor (album) =

Studio album by Sirenia
- Released: 23 January 2009
- Recorded: July–September, 2008
- Studio: Sound Suite Studios (France); Stargoth Studios (Norway)
- Genre: Symphonic metal; gothic metal
- Length: 42:38
- Label: Nuclear Blast
- Producer: Morten Veland

Sirenia chronology
Nine Destinies and a Downfall (2007)	The 13th Floor (2009)	The Enigma of Life (2011)

Singles from The 13th Floor
- 1. "The Path to Decay" Released: December 26, 2008

Professional ratings
Review scores
Source	Rating
AllMusic	3.5/5 stars
Dangerdog	3.5/5 stars

The 13th Floor is the fourth studio album by Norwegian gothic metal band Sirenia and their first with Spanish vocalist Ailyn. It was released on 23 January 2009, through Nuclear Blast. The band said "The album features guest appearances by Jan Kenneth Barkved (who had also made some guest appearances on our debut, [and] French violin player Stephanie Valentin adds to the sound along with the choir that has been a part of our sound since the very beginning." The album was released in three formats: CD, CD-Digi and box set. The box set edition was restricted to 500 copies worldwide. The download-only single, "The Path to Decay", was released on 26 December 2008.

== Track listing ==
- All songs written by Morten Veland.

No.	Title	Length
1.	"The Path to Decay"	4:19
2.	"Lost in Life"	3:14
3.	"The Mind Maelstrom"	4:50
4.	"The Seventh Summer"	5:24
5.	"Beyond Life's Scenery"	4:35
6.	"The Lucid Door"	4:51
7.	"Led Astray"	4:37
8.	"Winterborn 77"	5:36
9.	"Sirens of the Seven Seas"	5:12
Total length:		42:38

Limited edition bonus tracks
No.	Title	Length
10.	"The Path to Decay" (radio mix)	0:33
11.	"The Mind Maelstrom" (instrumental)	4:49
12.	"Winterborn 77" (instrumental)	5:33
Total length:		56:33

- The multimedia part includes photo gallery, wallpapers and screensavers. "The Path to Decay" was released as a promotional single and also has a video.

== Personnel ==
=== Sirenia ===
- Ailyn – female vocals (on all tracks)
- Morten Veland – clean male vocals (on track #4), harsh vocals (on all tracks except #2 & #7), all other instruments

=== Additional musicians ===
- Jan Kenneth Barkved – clean male vocals (on track #9)
- Stephanie Valentin – violin (on tracks #3, #7, #8 & #9)
- Damien Surian, Mathieu Landry, Emmanuelle Zoldan, Sandrine Gouttebe, Emilie Lesbros – choir (on all tracks)

== Production ==
- Arranged, produced and engineered by Morten Veland
- Additional recording at Sound Suite Studios by Terje Refsnes
- Mixed by Morten Veland and Tue Madsen
- Mastered by Tue Madsen
- Artwork by Jan Yrlund

== Charts ==
Chart performance for The 13th Floor
Chart (2009)	Peak position
French Albums (SNEP)	127
German Albums (Offizielle Top 100)	87
Swiss Albums (Schweizer Hitparade)	67
