= The Enigma of Life =

Studio album by Sirenia
- Released: 21 January 2011 (Europe)
- Recorded: July–November 2010 (Audio Avenue Studios/Sound Suite Studios)
- Genres: Symphonic metal, gothic metal
- Length: 54:35
- Languages: English, Spanish
- Label: Nuclear Blast
- Producer: Morten Veland

Sirenia chronology
The 13th Floor (2009)	The Enigma of Life (2011)	Perils of the Deep Blue (2013)

Professional ratings
Review scores
Source	Rating
About.com	3.5/5 stars
Allmusic	2.5/5 stars
Metal Storm	6.0
Revolver	2/5
Sputnikmusic	2.0

The Enigma of Life is the fifth studio album by the Norwegian gothic metal band Sirenia and their second with the Spanish vocalist Ailyn. It was released in Europe on 21 January 2011 through Nuclear Blast and in North America on 15 February 2011. The album was mastered at Finnvox Studios in Finland. The download-only single, "The End of It All", was released on 21 December 2010.

== Track listing ==
All songs written by Morten Veland.

No.	Title	Length
1.	"The End of It All"	4:31
2.	"Fallen Angel"	3:59
3.	"All My Dreams"	4:42
4.	"This Darkness"	4:00
5.	"The Twilight in Your Eyes"	4:00
6.	"Winter Land"	3:55
7.	"A Seaside Serenade"	5:53
8.	"Darkened Days to Come"	4:22
9.	"Coming Down"	4:38
10.	"This Lonely Lake"	3:33
11.	"Fading Star"	4:46
12.	"The Enigma of Life"	6:16
Total length:		54:35

Japanese edition bonus tracks
No.	Title	Length
13.	"Oscura Realidad" ("Dark Reality") (Japanese edition bonus track, Spanish version of "This Darkness")	4:31
14.	"The Enigma of Life" (acoustic, Japanese edition bonus track)	5:51
15.	"Fallen Angel" (acoustic, Japanese edition bonus track)	3:45
Total length:		68:42

Exclusive bonus version
No.	Title	Length
13.	"Oscura Realidad" ("Dark Reality" – Spanish version of "This Darkness")	4:31
14.	"El Enigma de la Vida" ("The Enigma of Life" (acoustic) – Spanish version of "The Enigma of Life")	5:51
15.	"El Enigma de la Vida" (iTunes exclusive bonus track)	6:16
Total length:		71:13

North American Edition Bonus Tracks
No.	Title	Length
13.	"Oscura Realidad" ("Dark Reality" – Spanish version of "This Darkness")
14.	"El Enigma de la Vida" ("The Enigma of Life" (acoustic) – Spanish version of "The Enigma of Life")

- "The End of It All" has a video.

== Personnel ==
=== Sirenia ===
- Morten Veland – vocals, all other instruments
- Ailyn – vocals

=== Session musicians ===
- Stephanie Valentin – violins
- Damien Surian, Mathieu Landry, Emmanuelle Zoldan, Sandrine Gouttebel, Emilie Lesbros – The Sirenian Choir

== Additional notes ==
- Spanish translations of "El Enigma de la Vida" and "Oscura Realidad" by Ailyn
- "The Enigma of Life" was recorded in Audio Avenue Studios (Tau, Norway), additional recordings of choirs, acoustic guitars and violin were recorded in Sound Suite Studios (Marseille, France)
- Written, composed, arranged, produced, mixed and engineered by Morten Veland
- Pre-produced in Audio Avenue Studios (Tau, Norway)
- Mastered by Mika Jussila, Finnvox Studios
- A+R by Jaap Waagemaker
- Cover artwork & design by Gustavo Sazes
- Band photos by Patric Ullaeus

== Charts ==
Chart (2011)	Peak position
German Albums Chart	73
Swiss Albums Chart	53
