= Perils of the Deep Blue =

Studio album by Sirenia
- Released: June 28, 2013
- Recorded: Sound Suite Studio, Marseille, France
- Genre: Gothic metal; symphonic metal; doom metal
- Length: 67:44
- Language: English, Spanish, Norwegian
- Label: Nuclear Blast
- Producer: Endre Kirkesola, Morten Veland

Sirenia chronology
The Enigma of Life (2011)	Perils of the Deep Blue (2013)	The Seventh Life Path (2015)

Singles from Perils of the Deep Blue
- 1. "Seven Widows Weep" Released: May 10, 2013

Professional ratings
Review scores
Source	Rating
About.com	3.5/5 stars
Sputnikmusic	4.5/5 stars

Perils of the Deep Blue is the sixth studio album by the Norwegian gothic metal band Sirenia. It was released on June 28, 2013, in Europe, July 1 in the United Kingdom and July 9 in North America by Nuclear Blast.

Produced by Morten Veland, it was mastered and mixed by Endre Kirkesola at Dub Studios in Norway.

It was the band's last album released by Nuclear Blast, before the expiration of their long-term contract.

== Cover art ==
The album cover art represents a fortuitous event. It was created by the British Gothic artist Anne Stokes. Veland found the sinister painting, titled "Siren's Lament" - a depiction of a reclining siren upon a rock in a sea cave, sliding her tail through the skulls of her (apparent) victims, as they float on the water surface - when he surfed the Internet looking for a suitable illustration for the album. He contacted Stokes, who is well known internationally for her fantasy art. She gave him permission to use it on the then unreleased album.

In the following releases, Veland chose to request much more complex, dark and tailored covers, created by the Hungarian artist Gyula Havancsák.

== Writing and recording ==
Spanish singer Ailyn joined a Norwegian choir in 2012 to for some training and for inspiration for the upcoming release. According to Morten, the writing process took two years and 5 months. He began writing for the album before the release of the previous one. In an interview, he said, "The entire band and all the people we are working with are absolutely ecstatic about it! This album takes SIRENIA to the next level and brings many new sides of us to the table. There's typical tried and tested SIRENIA stuff but also approaches that you've never heard from us before. I think I've never felt so good about an album throughout my entire career. I mean, I love them all, but this one is something special. It's the result of two and a half years of blood, sweat and tears. I've literally put my heart and soul into this record, so I am very curious to see what our fans as well as the press will think about it!"

== Promotion ==
On May 7, 2013, Sirenia released a studio trailer for the album on Facebook. On May 10, the band released a download single, "Seven Widows Weep", through Amazon along with "Ditt Endelikt".

The band released its second studio trailer showing the members' photo shoot for the album on May 21, 2013, on Nuclear Blast's YouTube channel.

On June 3, Sirenia premiered their latest music video for their single "Seven Widows Weep". It was filmed in April in Serbia by iCODE Team Productions.

A final release, of the song "Once A Star", was available from June 2013 for digital download only from iTunes.

== Reception ==
Perils of the Deep Blue was Sirenia's greatest commercial success to date. It was their first entry into the US charts: the Billboard's Hard Rock Albums (No. 97) and Heatseekers Albums - which lists the best-selling albums by artists who have never appeared in the Top 100 of the Billboard 200 - where it peaked at No. 20. Overall, it sold about 900 copies in the United States in its first week of release. By the end of that year, it had sold 1,560 copies.

Similarly, in Europe the release was quite important. It was Sirenia's first entry to the UK Rock Chart, where it peaked at No. 11. In the official German chart, it reached position No. 50 - the best position achieved by the band in charts of that country - and in the Swiss chart it peaked at number 43.

== Track listing ==
All tracks are written by Morten Veland.

No.	Title	Length
1.	"Ducere Me in Lucem" (Lead Me to the Light)	3:33
2.	"Seven Widows Weep"	6:57
3.	"My Destiny Coming to Pass"	5:16
4.	"Ditt endelikt" (Your Demise)	6:10
5.	"Cold Caress"	5:57
6.	"Darkling"	5:35
7.	"Decadence"	4:58
8.	"Stille kom døden" (Death Came Silently)	12:42
9.	"The Funeral March"	5:34
10.	"Profound Scars"	6:09
11.	"A Blizzard Is Storming"	4:49
12.	"Chains" (limited edition bonus track)	4:24
13.	"Blue Colleen" (limited edition bonus track)	5:01
14.	"Once a Star" (limited edition bonus track)	5:14
Total length:		72:19

- "Seven Widows Weep" has a video.

== Personnel ==
=== Sirenia ===
- Morten Veland – vocals, all other instruments
- Ailyn – vocals

=== Session musicians ===
- Joakim Næss – clean male vocals on "Ditt endelikt"
- Damien Surian, Mathieu Landry, Emmanuelle Zoldan and Emilie Bernou – The Sirenian Choir

== Additional notes ==
- Spanish translations on "Ditt endelikt" by Ailyn and Pilar García Ruiz
- "Perils of the Deep Blue" was recorded in Audio Avenue Studios (Tau, Norway), additional recordings of choirs and some acoustic guitars were recorded in Sound Suite Studios in Marseille, France
- Written, composed, arranged, produced and engineered by Morten Veland
- Pre-produced in Audio Avenue Studios in Tau, Norway
- Mixed and mastered by Endre Kirkesola at dUb studio in Oslo, Norway
- A+R by Jaap Waagemaker
- Cover artwork by Anne Stokes
- Design and layout by Wendy van den Bogert
- Band photos by Fotograf Tom Knudsen

== Charts ==
Chart (2013)	Peak position
Belgian Albums Chart (Flanders)	98
Belgian Albums Chart (Wallonia)	89
French Albums Chart	136
German Albums Chart	50
Swiss Albums Chart	43
UK Rock Chart	11
US Hard Rock Albums	97
US Heatseeker Albums	20
