= 1977 (Sirenia album) =

Studio album by Sirenia
- Released: 26 May 2023
- Studio: Audio Avenue Studios (Tau)
- Genre: Synth-pop
- Length: 49:01
- Language: English, French
- Label: Napalm
- Producer: Morten Veland

Sirenia chronology
Riddles, Ruins & Revelations (2021)	1977 (2023)	Amanita Messis (2026)

Singles from 1977
- 1. "Twist in My Sobriety" Released: 22 March 2023; 2. "Deadlight" Released: 18 April 2023; 3. "Wintry Heart" Released: 25 May 2023

1977 is the eleventh studio album by Norwegian band Sirenia. It was released on 26 May 2023 via Napalm Records. Three music videos was made for the album, "Twist in My Sobriety", a cover from English folk singer Tanita Tikaram, "Deadlight" and "Wintry Heart".

== Background ==
The title of the album 1977 is a reference to the year of birth of the band's leader, Morten Veland. The cover art features a lonely and abandoned tombstone with no name. Veland said this metaphorically represents the concept of the album: a return to his rock musical roots.

The album followed in the same vein as the previous Riddles, Ruins & Revelations (2021), in terms of its commercial style, loaded with synthesizers and a main role in the voice of Emmanuelle Zoldan. This style shows the band moving further away from their earlier symphonic gothic metal sound for "symphonic synth-pop", and it was received with much less enthusiasm by the band's fans, being their lowest charting since their first two albums.

Emmanuelle Zoldan said:

"1977" is a very varied and melodic album that explores a new style, infused with 70s-80s vibes. It is a dark album, with symphonic hitting and catchy melodies, that is nevertheless still faithful with the Sirenia sound and soul. The mix has been done by HK at the Vamacara Studio in Paris, who did an amazing job!

== Track listing ==
All tracks are written by Morten Veland, except where noted.

No.	Title	Length
1.	"Deadlight"	4:54
2.	"Wintry Heart"	4:03
3.	"Nomadic"	4:27
4.	"The Setting Darkness"	4:46
5.	"A Thousand Scars"	5:55
6.	"Fading to the Deepest Black"	3:36
7.	"Oceans Away"	5:02
8.	"Dopamine"	4:30
9.	"Delirium"	4:03
10.	"Timeless Desolation"	3:36
Total length:		44:52

Bonus track
No.	Title	Writer(s)	Length
11.	"Twist In My Sobriety" (Tanita Tikaram cover)	Tanita Tikaram	4:09
Total length:			49:01

== Personnel ==
Credits for 1977 adapted from liner notes.

Sirenia

- Morten Veland – harsh and clean vocals, guitars, bass, keyboards, programming, mixing, mastering, engineering
- Emmanuelle Zoldan – female vocals, French translation
- Nils Courbaron – lead guitars
- Michael Brush – drums

Production

- Gyula Havancsák – cover art, design, layout
- Cécile Delpoïo – photography
- Herr Krauss (HK) – mixing

== Charts ==
Chart performance for 1977
Chart (2023)	Peak position
Swiss Albums (Schweizer Hitparade)	78
