= Nine Destinies and a Downfall =

Studio album by Sirenia
- Released: 23 February 2007
- Recorded: Sound Suite Studio, Marseille, France; Jailhouse Studios, Kristiansand; Stargoth Studios, Tau, Norway; 17 July – 1 October 2006
- Genres: Gothic metal; symphonic metal
- Length: 43:01
- Label: Nuclear Blast
- Producers: Terje Refsnes, Morten Veland

Sirenia chronology
Sirenian Shores (2004)	Nine Destinies and a Downfall (2007)	The 13th Floor (2009)

Singles from Nine Destinies and a Downfall
- 1. "My Mind's Eye" Released: 22 December 2006 (digital only)

Professional ratings
Review scores
Source	Rating
About.com	3.5/5 stars
Metal Storm	4/5 stars

Nine Destinies and a Downfall is the third studio album by the Norwegian gothic metal band Sirenia. It was released on 23 February 2007 through Nuclear Blast. The enhanced CD of the digipak edition contains a bonus track, the video for the song "My Mind's Eye" and multimedia software. The music video was produced and directed by Serbian film company iCODE Team, being the first of the band. In March 2007 a second video was released, "The Other Side".

== Cover art ==
The album features a cover art based on a very futuristic luminous "cyborg" -with the face of new singer Monika Pedersen- and quite different from any other album by the band.

For the cover design, Nuclear Blast advised them to contact American graphic artist Anthony Clarkson, who designed covers for Blind Guardian, Rage, Lacuna Coil and In Flames among others. Anthony turned out to be a lifelong fan of Sirenia and happily did the job required.

== Background ==
At the end of 2004, the band's contract with Napalm Records expired and it was not renewed. Later, Sirenia accepted an offer from a new record label, Nuclear Blast, and they signed a long-term contract in March 2005.

Nine Destinies and a Downfall was recorded between 17 July and 1 October 2006 in three recording studios: Stargoth (Tau, Norway), Sound Suite (Marseille) and Jailhouse (Kristiansand), while it was mixed and mastered at Antfarm Studios (Aarhus, Denmark). Therefore, it is one of the most exhaustive productions of the band to raise the recording quality to a better level. The album it was released on 23 February 2007, almost three years after their previous album An Elixir for Existence.

It features a much-publicized new female lead singer, Danish-born Monika Pedersen (from Sinphonia) on her only album with Sirenia, who joined the band in April 2006 replacing Henriette Bordvik. It also features a new guitarist, Bjørnar Landa (from Artifact), a live member of the band since 2004 who replaced Kristian Gundersen, but did not participate in the recording sessions.

However, Pedersen's experience with Sirenia finished suddenly in November 2007 when she left the group due to musical disagreements during the European promotional tour scheduled with Therion.

== Musical style ==
The album features a remarkable (and definitive) change in the band's musical style, starting toward a more melodic and radio-friendly gothic metal sound, leaving out the most operatic sections and the violin passages, including fewer death growls by Morten Veland.

Specifically, it contains a mix of heavy and powerful songs with catchy chorus in dark lyrics, focused especially on the pure vocals of Pedersen; all of them strategic characteristics that gained the band access to a way broader audience.

== Reception ==
Nine Destinies and a Downfall was Sirenia's first album to hit the charts in several European countries.

Similarly, the single "My Mind's Eye" was their first great international success on some local radios. The music video was widely distributed in Austria, Switzerland, Australia and Germany and was broadcast on MTV.

== Track listing ==
- All songs written by Morten Veland.

No.	Title	Length
1.	"The Last Call"	4:45
2.	"My Mind's Eye"	3:41
3.	"One by One"	5:28
4.	"Sundown"	5:05
5.	"Absent Without Leave"	4:54
6.	"The Other Side"	3:55
7.	"Seven Keys and Nine Doors"	4:55
8.	"Downfall"	4:44
9.	"Glades of Summer"	5:36
Total length:		43:01

Limited edition bonus track
No.	Title	Length
10.	"My Mind's Eye (radio edit)"	3:17
Total length:		46:18

- The videos were shot for "The Other Side" and "My Mind's Eye".

== Personnel ==
Credits for Nine Destinies and a Downfall adapted from liner notes.

Sirenia

- Morten Veland – guitars, harsh vocals (tracks 4, 7, 8), clean vocals (tracks 5, 7), bass guitar, keyboards, programming, mixing, engineering
- Monika Pedersen – female vocals
- Jonathan Pérez – drums

Additional personnel

- Damien Surian, Mathieu Landry, Emmanuelle Zoldan, Sandrine Gouttebel – choir

Production

- Anthony Clarkson – artwork
- Terje Refsnes – engineering
- Hans Eidsgard – engineering
- Tue Madsen – mixing, mastering
- Timo Pollinger – design

== Charts ==
Chart performance for Nine Destinies and a Downfall
Chart (2007)	Peak position
French Albums (SNEP)	134
German Albums (Offizielle Top 100)	54
Swiss Albums (Schweizer Hitparade)	85
