= Delirium Veil =

Studio album by Twilightning
- Released: April 22, 2003
- Recorded: Astia Studios; September 16 – December 7, 2002
- Genre: Power metal
- Length: 48:23
- Label: Spinefarm Records

Twilightning chronology
Delirium Veil (2003)	Plague-House Puppet Show (2004)

Alternative cover
- Japanese album cover

Delirium Veil is the debut studio album by Twilightning, released April 22, 2003, on the label Spinefarm Records.

== Background ==
In 2002, Finnish metal group Twilightning signed a recording deal with European label Spinefarm Records. In September 2002, the group entered the studio with producer Anssi Kippo and began recording their debut album. After just three weeks, the group exited the studio for unknown reasons, but resumed recording after five weeks off and recorded for another 10 days, finishing in early December 2002. The album was mixed the next month by highly regarded Finnish musician Timo Tolkki and then was released in April 2003. The critical response for the album was positive, with reviewers making comparisons to Edguy, Stratovarius, and Sonata Arctica. The Japanese edition of the album was released with alternative cover artwork and two bonus tracks: "The Escapist" and "Affection Seeker." The album takes its title from the fourth track "Delirium Veil."

== Content and musical style ==
After the song "Jester Realm," there is a keyboard interlude entitled "Trip to the Dale Beyond the Delirium Veil," written by Ville Wallenius, Tommi Sartanen, and Mikko Naukkarinen. Guitarist Tommi Sartanen stated in an interview that the song "Masked Ball Dalliance" was about a ballroom dance that turns into a giant orgy. Despite their complexities, all songs from this album have been played live by the group. The song "Seventh Dawn" is about hangovers, and the song "Jester Realm" is about the Finnish military service.

== Track listing ==
1. "Gone to the Wall" (Ville Wallenius) – 04:50
2. "At the Forge" (Tommi Sartanen) – 05:57
3. "Jester Realm" (Wallenius & Sartanen) – 06:57
4. "Delirium Veil" (Sartanen) – 04:17
5. "Return to Innocence" (Wallenius & Sartanen) – 06:06
6. "Under Somber Skies" (Wallenius & Heikki Pöyhiä) – 05:59
7. "Seventh Dawn" (Wallenius) – 04:25
8. "Enslaved to the Mind" (Wallenius) – 04:48
9. "Masked Ball Dalliance" (Sartanen) – 05:04
  Japanese bonus tracks
10. "The Escapist" (Sartanen) – 05:32
11. "Affection Seeker" (Sartanen) – 04:43

== Personnel ==
=== Twilightning ===
- Tommi Sartanen – Guitars
- Ville Wallenius – Guitars
- Jussi Kainulainen – Bass guitars
- Juha Leskinen – Drums
- Heikki Pöyhiä – Vocals
- Mikko Naukkarinen – Keyboards

== Production ==
- Recorded at Astia-Studio A by Anssi Kippo from September 16 – December 7, 2002
- Mixed at Finnvox Studios by Timo Tolkki in January 2003
- Mastered by Mika Jussila at Finnvox Studios
- Produced by Anssi Kippo
- Additional arrangements by Anssi Kippo
- Artwork and logo by Toxicangel
- Band photography by Toni Härkönen
