= Bedlam (EP) =

EP by Twilightning
- Released: 27 March 2006
- Genre: Power metal
- Label: Universal International

Twilightning chronology
Plague-House Puppet Show (2004)	Bedlam (2006)	Swinelords (2007)

Professional ratings
Review scores
Source	Rating
Scream Magazine	4/6 stars

Bedlam is an EP by Twilightning, released on 27 March 2006 on the Universal International label.

== Track listing ==
1. "Space of Disgrace"
2. "Rolling Heads"
3. "Sex Jail"
4. "Plague Overload"
5. "Train to Bedlam"

== Personnel ==
- Tommi Sartanen – Guitars
- Ville Wallenius – Guitars
- Jussi Kainulainen – Bass guitars
- Juha Leskinen – Drums
- Heikki Pöyhiä – Vocals
- Mikko Naukkarinen – Keyboards
