= Dim Days of Dolor =

Studio album by Sirenia
- Released: November 11, 2016
- Recorded: July–September 2016
- Studio: Audio Avenue Studios in Tau, Rogaland, Norway, Sound Suite Studios in Marseille, Provence-Alpes-Côte d'Azur, France
- Genre: Gothic metal; symphonic metal
- Length: 56:35
- Language: English, French
- Label: Napalm Records
- Producer: Morten Veland

Sirenia chronology
The Seventh Life Path (2015)	Dim Days of Dolor (2016)	Arcane Astral Aeons (2018)

Singles from Dim Days of Dolor
- 1. "The 12th Hour" Released: October 7, 2016; 2. "Dim Days of Dolor" Released: November 11, 2016

Dim Days of Dolor is the eighth studio album by the Norwegian gothic metal band Sirenia. It was released on November 11, 2016 through Napalm Records. It is their first album with French vocalist Emmanuelle Zoldan following the departure of Ailyn.

On October 6, 2016, it was released a lyric video for "The 12th Hour". A music video was made for the song "Dim Days of Dolor" directed by Owe Lingvall and released on November 11, 2016.

== Background ==
Dim Days of Dolor was composed in the beginning of 2016, and recorded between June and July of that year in Morten Veland 's personal recording studio (Audio Avenue Studios) in Tau, Rogaland. Additional recordings were made at Sound Suite Studios in Marseille.

On July 5, Sirenia announced that their female vocalist Ailyn Giménez left the band for "personal reasons". She didn't participate in any of the final recording sessions held for this work, but she recorded the full album in demo version during the early stages.

On August, the album was mixed at Hansen Studios in Ribe, Denmark. The cover artwork was again created by Gyula Havancsák from Hjules Illustration And Design.

On September 8, French mezzo-soprano singer Emmanuelle Zoldan was officially announced as the new female vocalist, once the instrumental recordings and mixed were finished. Later, her vocal tracks were included.

The album was performed live for first time in Postbahnhof, Berlin on November 10, at the beginning of an extensive European tour.

One of the notable aspects is the little presence of Veland's harsh vocals, and the less participation of the traditional French opera choir (The Sirenian Choir) in most of songs, in comparison to their previous albums.

== Track listing ==
All tracks are written by Morten Veland.

No.	Title	Length
1.	"Goddess of the Sea"	4:41
2.	"Dim Days of Dolor"	4:40
3.	"The 12th Hour"	6:37
4.	"Treasure n' Treason"	4:54
5.	"Cloud Nine"	5:14
6.	"Veil of Winter"	5:29
7.	"Ashes to Ashes"	4:36
8.	"Elusive Sun"	5:22
9.	"Playing with Fire"	5:05
10.	"Fifth Column"	6:02
11.	"Aeon's Embrace"	3:55
Total length:		56:35

Bonus track
No.	Title	Lyrics	Length
12.	"Aeon's Embrace" (French version)	Emmanuelle Zoldan	3:55
Total length:			60:30

== Personnel ==
Credits for Dim Days of Dolor adapted from liner notes.

Sirenia

- Morten Veland – harsh vocals (track 3, 9, 10), guitars, bass, keyboards, theremin, drum programming, engineering
- Emmanuelle Zoldan – female vocals, choir vocals, lyrics translation (tracks 9, 12)

Additional musicians

- Joakim Næss – clean male vocals (tracks 2, 6)
- Damien Surian, Mathieu Landry, Emilie Bernou – The Sirenian Choir

Production

- Jacob Hansen – mixing, mastering
- Gyula Havancsák – cover art, design, layout
- Andreas Kalvig Anderson – photography
- Hervé Brouardelle – photography

== Chart positions ==
Chart (2016)	Peak position
Belgian Albums (Ultratop Wallonia)	150
Swiss Albums (Schweizer Hitparade)	89
UK Rock & Metal Albums (OCC)	34
