= Sirenian Shores =

EP by Sirenia
- Released: 11 October 2004
- Recorded: Stargoth Studios, Tau, Norway; Sound Suite Studio, Marseille, France
- Genres: Symphonic metal, gothic metal
- Length: 21:43
- Label: Napalm
- Producers: Terje Refsnes, Morten Veland

Sirenia chronology
An Elixir for Existence (2004)	Sirenian Shores (2004)	Nine Destinies and a Downfall (2007)

Professional ratings
Review scores
Source	Rating
Metal Storm	(6.6/10)

Sirenian Shores is the first EP by the Norwegian gothic metal band Sirenia. It was released on 11 October 2004 by Napalm Records. It is the last work recorded with the female lead singer Henriette Bordvik, who left the band in November 2005.

== Background ==
This EP is essentially a compilation of new versions of two of the best songs from Sirenia previous albums, and three unreleased songs that only appear here.

It includes a remix of "Save Me from Myself" (from the second album An Elixir for Existence), an acoustic version of "Meridian" (from the first album At Sixes and Sevens), and three new songs: "Sirenian Shores", "Obire Mortem" and a cover of Leonard Cohen's "First We Take Manhattan".

== Track listing ==
All tracks written and composed by Morten Veland, except where noted.

No.	Title	Lyrics	Length
1.	"Sirenian Shores"		6:01
2.	"Save Me from Myself" (remix)		5:05
3.	"Meridian" (acoustic)		4:05
4.	"First We Take Manhattan" (Leonard Cohen cover)	Leonard Cohen	3:56
5.	"Obire Mortem" (instrumental, Meeting Death)		2:22
Total length:			21:43

== Personnel ==
All information from the EP booklet.

Sirenia

- Morten Veland – harsh vocals, guitars, bass, keyboards, drum programming, mixing
- Henriette Bordvik – female vocals

Additional musicians

- Fabienne Gondamin – vocals on "Meridian"
- Emmanuelle Zoldan – vocals on "First We Take Manhattan", choir vocals
- Kristian Gundersen – clean vocals
- Anne Verdot – violin

Choir

- Damien Surian, Emilie Lesbros, Johanna Giraud, Sandrine Gouttebel, Hubert Piazzola, Mathieu Landry

Production

- Terje Refsnes – mixing, engineering
- Ulf Horbelt – mastering
- Joachim Luetke – artwork, design
- Emile M.E. Ashley – photography
