= Riddles, Ruins & Revelations =

Studio album by Sirenia
- Released: 12 February 2021
- Studio: Audio Avenue Studios (Tau)
- Genre: Symphonic metal, synth-pop
- Length: 50:26
- Language: English, French
- Label: Napalm
- Producer: Morten Veland

Sirenia chronology
Arcane Astral Aeons (2018)	Riddles, Ruins & Revelations (2021)	1977 (2023)

Singles from Riddles, Ruins & Revelations
- 1. "Addiction No. 1" Released: 8 December 2020; 2. "We Come to Ruins" Released: 12 January 2021; 3. "Voyage Voyage" Released: 10 February 2021

Professional ratings
Review scores
Source	Rating
Blabbermouth	7.5/10
Metal Hammer	3.5/5 stars
Ghost Cult Magazine	7/10

Riddles, Ruins & Revelations is the tenth studio album by Norwegian symphonic metal band Sirenia. It was released on 12 February 2021 via Napalm Records. The first single "Addiction No. 1" was released on 8 December 2020, along with a music video. The second single, "We Come to Ruins", was released on 12 January 2021. On 10 February 2021, the band released their third single which is a cover of French singer Desireless, "Voyage, voyage".

It was elected by Metal Hammer as the 24th best symphonic metal album.

== Background ==
Riddles, Ruins & Revelations was recorded and produced in its entirety at Morten Veland's personal studio (Audio Avenue Studios) in Tau, Norway in mid-2020. It is the first album of the band that does not feature additional recordings in Marseille with the mixed French symphonic choir (called the Sirenian Choir).

Sirenia's tenth album is a remarkable stylistic shift for the group, blending synth-pop with their usual symphonic metal musical style, opting for a more commercial bet which included the release of two music videos, and moving away from the gothic sound that characterized them in the past, twenty years after their foundation. Veland said:

The album is very diverse, as a Sirenia album should be. There's a lot of material that shows the band from a new side, and there is lots of material that is to be expected from the band musically. All in all the album will take the listeners through a journey that will cover both familiar and unexplored musical landscapes.[...]

== Track listing ==
All tracks are written by Morten Veland, except where noted.

No.	Title	Length
1.	"Addiction No. 1"	4:03
2.	"Towards an Early Grave"	5:27
3.	"Into Infinity"	4:41
4.	"Passing Seasons"	4:43
5.	"We Come to Ruins"	5:12
6.	"Downwards Spiral"	5:55
7.	"Beneath the Midnight Sun"	4:43
8.	"The Timeless Waning"	4:04
9.	"December Snow"	5:20
10.	"This Curse of Mine"	4:18
Total length:		50:26

Bonus track
No.	Title	Writer(s)	Length
11.	"Voyage Voyage" (Desireless cover)	Jean-Michel Rivat and Dominique Dubois	4:18
Total length:			54:44

== Personnel ==
Credits for Riddles, Ruins & Revelations adapted from liner notes.

Sirenia

- Morten Veland – harsh and clean vocals, guitars, bass, keyboards, programming, mixing, mastering, engineering
- Emmanuelle Zoldan – female vocals, French translation
- Nils Courbaron – guitars
- Michael Brush – drums

Additional musician

- Joakim Næss – clean vocals in "Downwards Spiral"

Production

- Gyula Havancsák – cover art, design, layout
- Richelle ter Heege – photography

== Charts ==
Chart performance for Riddles, Ruins & Revelations
Chart (2021)	Peak position
German Albums (Offizielle Top 100)	89
Swiss Albums (Schweizer Hitparade)	18
