= Morten Veland =

Norwegian musician (born 1977)

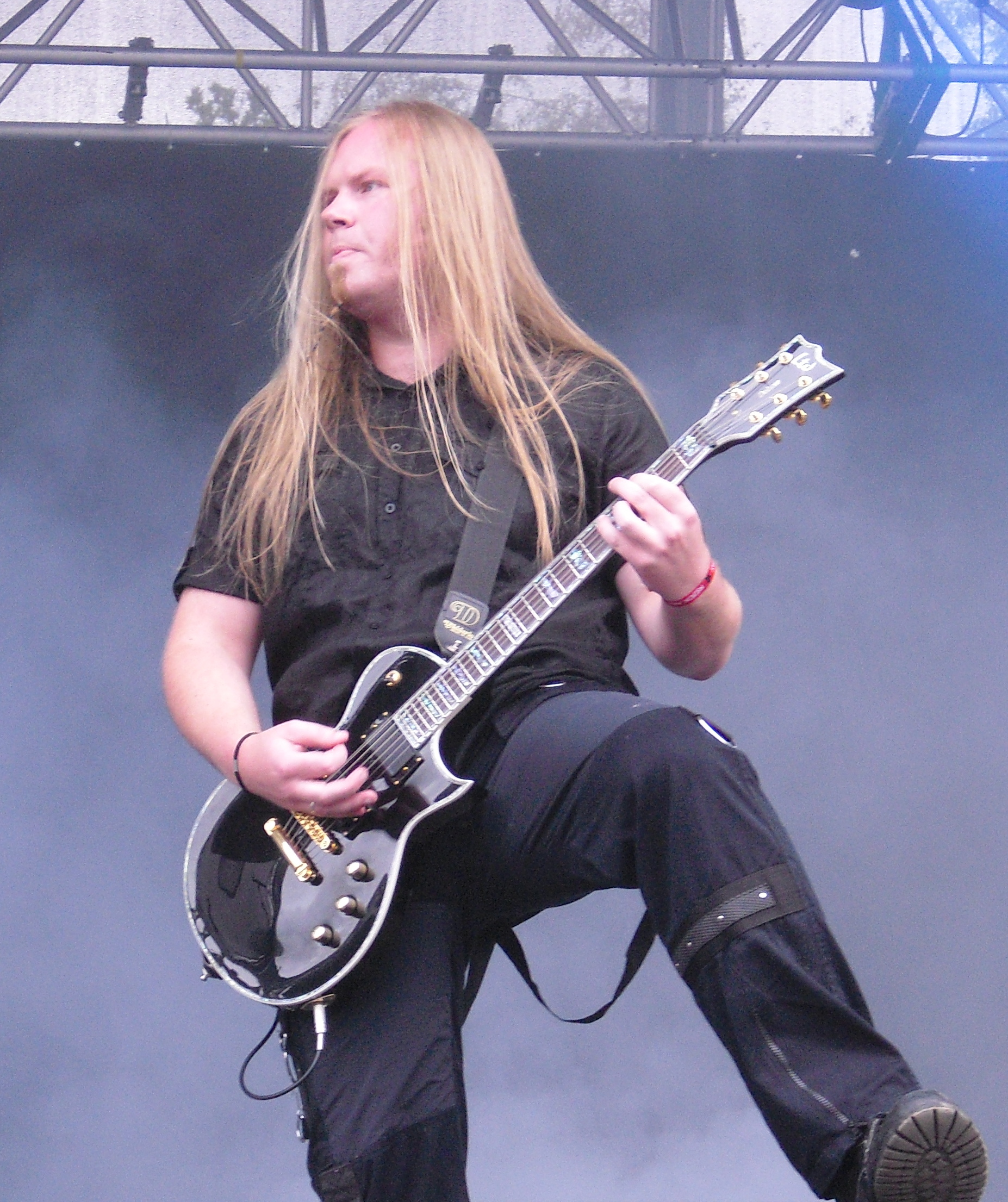
- Veland in 2009

Background information
- Born: 4 December 1977 (age 48)
- Origin: Stavanger, Norway
- Genres: Gothic metal, symphonic metal, doom metal, death-doom, symphonic black metal
- Occupations: Musician, songwriter, producer, composer
- Instruments: Guitar, bass, keyboards, vocals, programming
- Years active: 1992–present
- Labels: Napalm, Nuclear Blast
- Member of: Sirenia; Mortemia
- Formerly of: Tristania

Morten Veland (born 4 December 1977) is a Norwegian musician. He is one of the founding members of the gothic metal band Tristania and the founding member of Sirenia and Mortemia.

== Background ==
At the age of 14, Veland began saving to buy his first electric guitar. He would lock himself up and practice every day and night. Veland was inspired by Guns N' Roses' Appetite for Destruction and Alice Cooper's Trash, and afterwards by The Sisters of Mercy, Fields of the Nephilim, and The Mission, amongst others.

== Career ==
=== Early days ===
In 1992, Veland entered the music scene when he was 15 years old. He and bandmate Kenneth Olsson, who would later form Tristania, formed Uzi Suicide. They were described as a fusion of rock and metal. However, he grew more interested in the UK gothic scene. It took his songwriting to a darker, gloomier place. Fragments of Uzi Suicide turned into Tristania.

=== 1995–2001: Tristania ===
In 1995, he co-founded Tristania, and at age 19 signed his first record deal. Veland released two albums and couple EPs with the band. Tristania became a leading act in the genre at the time. They toured throughout the American continent and Europe. The band performed in some of the biggest music festivals in Europe. Whilst in Tristania, he was the main lyricist, songwriter and guitarist as well as responsible for the growling vocals. He left Tristania after the first two full-length albums due to social and musical differences.

=== 2001–present: Sirenia ===
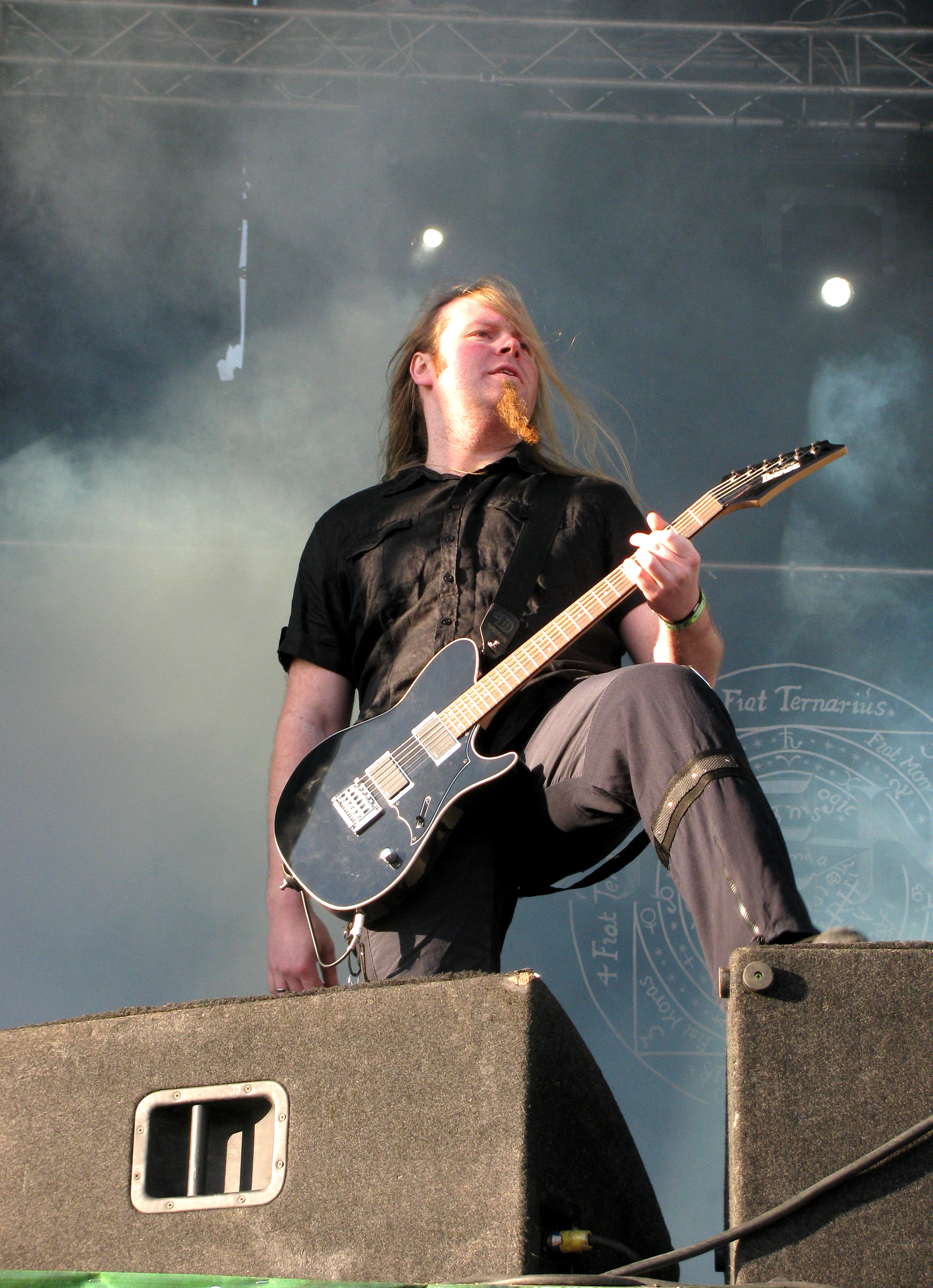
Veland with Sirenia in 2010

After Tristania, in 2001, Veland formed his own band Sirenia, composing the same genre of music, in which he contributes nearly all of the instruments as well as the growling vocals. The rest of the band (except female singer and choir members) are mostly used on live performances only.

=== Mortemia ===
While taking Sirenia on a more melodic direction, Veland began writing other types of music. He ended up with many ideas, but they didn't fit his current band's musical concept. He decided to form Mortemia. The music has a similar style to that of Tristania's second album Beyond the Veil. The band signed a contract with Napalm Records on 6 July 2009. Mortemia is a studio project only, but he has considered doing a live lineup. After 11 years of inactivity, Veland announced a brand new EP titled The Pandemic Pandemonium Sessions on 11 May 2021. This EP is a different concept that feature many female vocalists in each song.

== Influence ==
He cites Guns N' Roses, Metallica, Leonard Cohen, The Sisters of Mercy, Fields of the Nephilim, The Mission, Tiamat, Nick Cave, and Paradise Lost as his chief influences.

== Personal life ==
Veland has his own recording studio called Audio Avenue (until 2010 named Stargoth Studios) in Tau village, Rogaland, where he lives regularly. He works as a producer and engineer. During his spare time he collects cognacs, red wines, and beers. He enjoys playing chess, fishing, and hiking. He is married to Elaine, they have a couple of children together.

== Discography ==
=== Tristania ===
==== Demos ====
- Tristania (EP, 1997)

==== Albums ====
- Widow's Weeds (1998)
- Beyond the Veil (1999)

==== Singles ====
- Angina (1999)

==== Live albums ====
- Widow's Tour (1999)
- Widow's Tour/Angina (1999)

==== Compilation albums ====
- Midwintertears / Angina (2001)
- Midwinter Tears (2005)

==== Music videos ====
- Evenfall (1998)

=== Sirenia ===
==== Demos ====
- Sirenian Shores (EP, 2004)

==== Albums ====
- At Sixes and Sevens (2002)
- An Elixir For Existence (2004)
- Nine Destinies and a Downfall (2007)
- The 13th Floor (2009)
- The Enigma of Life (2011)
- Perils of the Deep Blue (2013)
- The Seventh Life Path (2015)
- Dim Days of Dolor (2016)
- Arcane Astral Aeons (2018)
- Riddles, Ruins & Revelations (2021)
- 1977 (2023)

==== Singles ====
- My Mind's Eye (2007)
- The Path to Decay (2009)
- The End of It All (2011)
- Seven Widows Weep (2013)
- Once My Light (2015)
- The 12th Hour (2016)
- Dim Days of Dolor (2016)
- Love Like Cyanide (2018)
- Into the Night (2018)
- Addiction No. 1 (2020)
- We Come to Ruins (2021)
- Voyage, voyage (2021, Desireless cover)

==== Music videos ====
- My Mind's Eye (2007)
- The Other Side (2007)
- The Path to Decay (2009)
- The End of It All (2011)
- Seven Widows Weep (2013)
- Addiction No. 1 (2020)
- Voyage, voyage (2021, Desireless cover)

=== Mortemia ===
==== Albums ====
- Misere Mortem (2010)

==== EPs ====
- The Pandemic Pandemonium Sessions (2021)
- The Covid Aftermath Sessions (2022–2023)
- The Cover Collab Sessions (2025–today)

==== Music videos ====
- The One I Once Was (2010)
