= Plague-House Puppet Show =

Studio album by Twilightning
- Released: November 16, 2004
- Genre: Power metal
- Label: Spinefarm Records

Twilightning chronology
Delirium Veil (2003)	Plague-House Puppet Show (2004)	Bedlam (2006)

Singles from Plague-House Puppet Show
- 1. "Into Treason" Released: January 14, 2005

Plague-House Puppet Show is the second studio album by Twilightning, released November 16, 2004, on the label Spinefarm Records.

== Track listing ==
1. "Plague-House Puppet Show" (Ville Wallenius) – 04:19
2. "Into Treason" (Tommi Sartanen) – 05:07
3. "The Fiend" (Wallenius) – 04:23
4. "Victim of Deceit" (Sartanen) – 04:11
5. "Painting the Blue Eyes" (Wallenius) – 04:31
6. "In the Fervor's Frontier" (Wallenius) – 04:56
7. "Fever Pitch" (Wallenius) – 03:49
8. "Diamonds of Mankind" (Sartanen) – 04:56
9. "Riot Race" (Wallenius) – 05:27
10. "Lubricious Thoughts" (Wallenius) – 05:13
11. "Goddess of Fortune" (Japanese Bonus Track) - 05:07
12. "Wind-up Toy" (Alice Cooper cover) - 04:37

== Personnel ==
- Tommi Sartanen – Guitars
- Ville Wallenius – Guitars
- Jussi Kainulainen – Bass guitars
- Juha Leskinen – Drums
- Heikki Pöyhiä – Vocals
- Mikko Naukkarinen – Keyboards
