= Emmanuelle Zoldan =

French singer (born 1977)

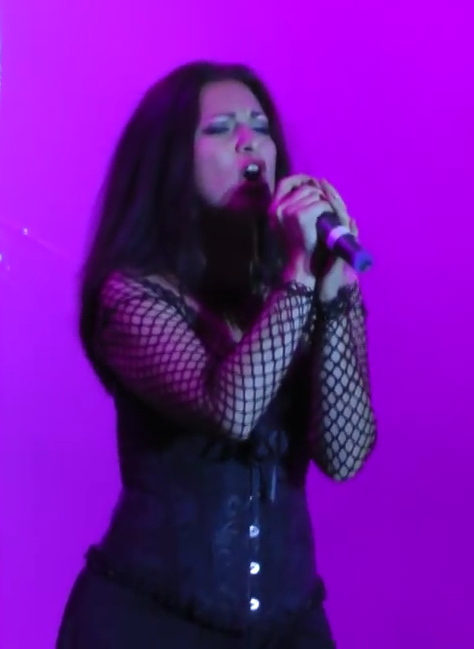
- Zoldan in 2016

Background information
- Also known as: Emma
- Born: 18 June 1977 (age 49)
- Origin: Aix-en-Provence, France
- Genres: Gothic metal, symphonic metal
- Occupation: Singer
- Years active: 2003–present
- Member of: Sirenia
- Website: mortenveland.com/sirenia

Emmanuelle Zoldan (born 18 June 1977) is a French singer known for her work as a session musician in heavy metal bands Sirenia, Trail of Tears and Turisas, among others. She is currently the vocalist of Sirenia.

== Career ==
Zoldan is an operatic mezzo-soprano singer. She has combined her musical activities in the most diverse genres, singing in several operas in France for many years and simultaneously working with some metal bands and other personal projects. Two of her most notable appearances were in Trail of Tears's Existentia (2007) and Turisas's Battle Metal (2004), where she was the main female vocalist.

On 8 September 2016, Norwegian gothic metal band Sirenia announced Zoldan as their new official vocalist, replacing Spanish singer Ailyn Giménez. She had worked with Sirenia for 13 years as part of their "Sirenian Choir". She contributed lead vocals to a cover of Leonard Cohen's "First We Take Manhattan", included in the EP Sirenian Shores (2004).

== Discography ==
=== With Sirenia ===
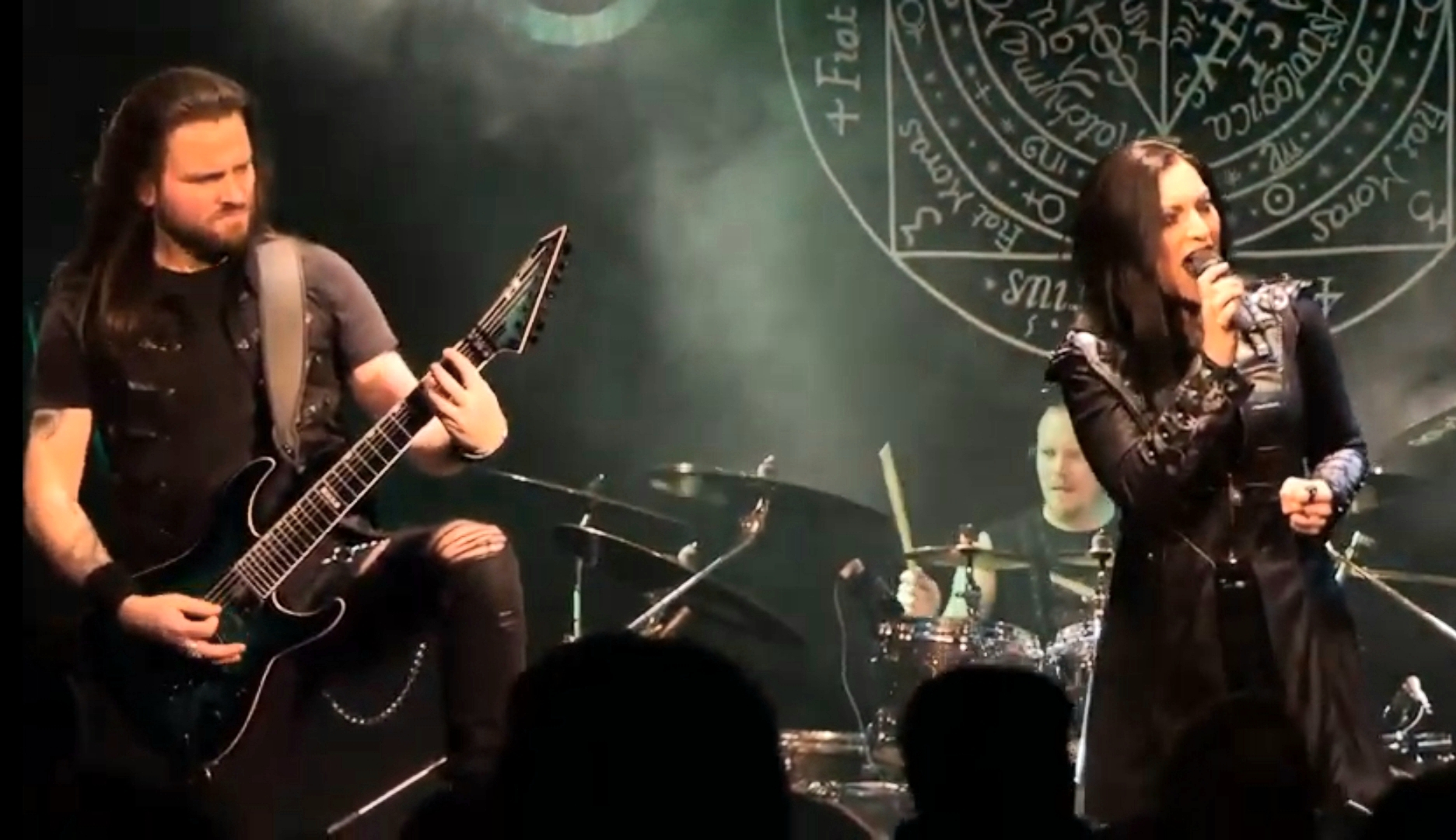
Zoldan with Sirenia in 2019

- Dim Days of Dolor (2016)
- Arcane Astral Aeons (2018)
- Riddles, Ruins & Revelations (2021)
- 1977 (2023)

=== As session musician ===
==== With Penumbra ====
- Seclusion (2003)

==== With Turisas ====
- Battle Metal (2004)

==== With Sirenia ====
- An Elixir for Existence (2004)
- Sirenian Shores (EP, 2004)
- Nine Destinies and a Downfall (2007)
- The 13th Floor (2009)
- The Enigma of Life (2011)
- Perils of the Deep Blue (2013)
- The Seventh Life Path (2015)

==== With Trail of Tears ====
- Existentia (2007)

==== With Mortemia ====
- Misere Mortem (2010)
