= Misere Mortem =

Studio album by Mortemia
- Released: February 24, 2010
- Recorded: Audio Avenue Studio, Stavanger, Norway
- Genre: Gothic metal, symphonic metal
- Length: 40:34
- Label: Napalm
- Producer: Morten Veland

Mortemia chronology
Misere Mortem (2010)	The Pandemic Pandemonium Sessions (2021)

Professional ratings
Review scores
Source	Rating
AllMusic	3.5/5 stars
About.com	link

Misere Mortem is the debut studio album by the Norwegian gothic metal band Mortemia. The design was done by the agency angst-im-wald.

== Track listing ==
No.	Title	Length
1.	"The One I Once Was"	4:46
2.	"The Pain Infernal and the Fall Eternal"	5:16
3.	"The Eye of the Storm"	5:10
4.	"The Malice of Life's Cruel Ways"	5:02
5.	"The Wheel of Fire"	4:09
6.	"The Chains That Wield My Mind"	4:29
7.	"The New Desire"	3:50
8.	"The Vile Bringer of Self-Destructive Thoughts"	3:52
9.	"The Candle at the Tunnel's End"	4:00
Total length:		40:34

== Personnel ==
- Morten Veland - vocals, guitars, bass, keyboards, drum programming, producer

=== Additional personnel and staff ===
- Damien Surian - choir vocals
- Mathieu Landry - choir vocals
- Emmanuelle Zoldan - choir vocals
- Sandrine Gouttebel - choir vocals
- Mika Jussila - mastering
