= Arcane Astral Aeons =

Studio album by Sirenia
- Released: 26 October 2018
- Recorded: May – July 2018
- Studio: Audio Avenue Studios in Tau, Rogaland, Norway, Sound Suite Studios in Marseille, Provence-Alpes-Côte d'Azur, France
- Genre: Gothic metal; symphonic metal
- Length: 55:12
- Language: English, French
- Label: Napalm
- Producer: Morten Veland, Jacob Hansen

Sirenia chronology
Dim Days of Dolor (2016)	Arcane Astral Aeons (2018)	Riddles, Ruins & Revelations (2021)

Singles from Arcane Astral Aeons
- 1. "Love Like Cyanide" Released: 21 September 2018; 2. "Into the Night" Released: 12 October 2018

Arcane Astral Aeons is the ninth studio album by the Norwegian gothic metal band Sirenia. It was released on 26 October 2018 through Napalm Records.

A lyric video was made for the single "Love Like Cyanide" released on 21 September 2018. The song features a guest appearance by Yannis Papadopoulos from Finnish band Beast in Black. On October 12, "Into the Night" was released as the second single along followed by a music video on October 19. Both videos were directed by Swedish filmmaker and musician Owe Lingvall.

== Background ==
Arcane Astral Aeons was composed by Morten Veland at the beginning of 2018, during the break of an intense North American tour that Sirenia finished in April.

On August 14, album details were revealed; basically, is the same production and engineering of their predecessor work Dim Days of Dolor (2016). It was recorded between May and July 2018 in Veland's personal recording studio (Audio Avenue Studios) in Tau, Rogaland. Additional recordings were made at Sound Suite Studios in Marseille.

In contrast to any other Sirenia previous album, all members contributed in the recording studio. Specifically, live guitarists Jan Erik Soltvedt and Nils Courbaron both played guitar solos on several tracks. Additionally, Emmanuelle Zoldan demonstrated her operatic vocal skills much more and wrote the French lyrics in two songs. About it and their intense promotion campaign, Veland said:

This album is something unique to us as it is the first one we have made together with our fans; everyone who have supported our pledge campaign has directly contributed to the funding of the album and to make it what it has turned out to be. [...]

The album was mixed at Hansen Studios in Ribe, Denmark by producer and mixing engineer Jacob Hansen. The cover artwork was again created by Hungarian artist Gyula Havancsák from Hjules Illustration And Design.

== Track listing ==
All tracks are written by Morten Veland, except "Nos heures sombres" by Emmanuelle Zoldan.

No.	Title	Length
1.	"In Styx Embrace"	6:02
2.	"Into the Night"	4:40
3.	"Love Like Cyanide"	5:49
4.	"Desire"	5:15
5.	"Asphyxia"	5:37
6.	"Queen of Lies"	3:55
7.	"Nos heures sombres" (Our Dark Hours)	4:30
8.	"The Voyage"	5:10
9.	"Aerodyne"	4:40
10.	"The Twilight Hour"	4:04
11.	"Glowing Embers"	5:32
Total length:		55:12

Bonus track
No.	Title	Length
12.	"Love Like Cyanide" (Edit version)	4:06
Total length:		59:18

== Personnel ==
All information from the album booklet.

Sirenia

- Morten Veland – harsh vocals, guitars, bass, keyboards, drum programming, engineering
- Emmanuelle Zoldan – female and choir vocals, French lyrics on "Nos heures sombres" and "Desire"
- Nils Courbaron – lead guitar on tracks 1, 2 and 10
- Jan Erik Soltvedt – lead guitar on tracks 5 and 8

Additional musicians

- Yannis Papadopoulos – clean male vocals on "Love Like Cyanide"
- Østen Bergøy – clean male vocals on "Aerodyne"
- Stéphanie Valentin – violin
- Damien Surian, Emilie Bernou, Mathieu Landry – The Sirenian Choir

Production

- Gyula Havancsák – cover art work, design and layout
- Béranger Bazin – photography
- Terje Refsnes – mixing, engineering
- Jacob Hansen – mixing, engineering

== Charts ==
Chart (2018)	Peak position
Belgian Albums (Ultratop Flanders)	131
Belgian Albums (Ultratop Wallonia)	150
Swiss Albums (Schweizer Hitparade)	80
