= Matador (Danish musical) =

Matador is a 2007 Danish musical based on the 1978-82 television series of the same name. It was first performed on 10 June 2007 at the Copenhagen Opera House. The production was created by Peter Langdale (producer), Bent Fabricius-Bjerre (composer) with lyrics by Clemens Telling. The story is based on Lise Nørgaard's popular TV series first broadcast in 1978. The production was closely associated with the Danish National Chamber Orchestra.

Fabricius-Bjerre had 30 years earlier written the catchy theme tune for the TV series.

The musical tells the story of a number of families in a small town in Zealand before and during the Second World War and the German occupation of Denmark.
