= Twilightning =

Finnish power metal band

- Origin: Imatra, Finland
- Genres: Power metal, heavy metal
- Years active: 1998–2009
- Labels: Spinefarm Records
- Past members: Tommi Sartanen; Ville Wallenius; Jussi Kainulainen; Juha Leskinen; Heikki Pöyhiä; Mikko Naukkarinen

Twilightning was a Finnish power metal band from Imatra, which formed in 1998. They disbanded in June 2009.

== Biography ==
Twilightning formed in 1998, consisting of guitarists Tommi Sartanen and Ville Wallenius, bassist Jussi Kainulainen, and drummer Juha Leskinen, with Tommi also on vocals. After releasing their first demo in 1999, they were joined by keyboardist Mikko Naukkarinen. Following the release of their second demo in 2001, Heikki Pöyhiä joined as lead singer. With this reinforced lineup, they release a third demo, which demonstrated their strong influence from 1980s heavy metal. Thanks to the interest this stirred, the group signed to Spinefarm Records, releasing their debut Delirium Veil in 2003, which drew comparisons to Edguy, Stratovarius, and Sonata Arctica. They followed that up by releasing Plague-House Puppet Show in 2004, and the EP Bedlam in 2006. Shortly after the release of Bedlam, Mikko Naukkarinen left the band.

The last release by Twilightning was Swinelords, released in 2007. It departed significantly from the distinctive power metal sounds of their previous releases, drifting more into the 80s hard rock genre. It features more relaxed vocals and guitar work, as well as a lesser extent of keyboards compared to previous albums.

On 8 June 2009 Twilightning posted on its website that the band is no longer active. Lack of motivation to continue the band was the only reason that was posted.

== Band members ==
=== Final lineup ===
- Tommi Sartanen – guitar, vocals (1998–2009)
- Ville Wallenius – guitar (1998–2009)
- Jussi Kainulainen – bass (1998–2009)
- Juha Leskinen – drums (1998–2009)
- Heikki Pöyhiä – vocals (2001–2009)

=== Former ===
- Mikko Naukkarinen – keyboards (1999–2006)

== Discography ==
Studio albums

- Delirium Veil (2003)
- Plague-House Puppet Show (2004)
- Swinelords (2007)

EPs

- Bedlam (2006)
