= Swinelords =

Studio album by Twilightning
- Released: May 7, 2007
- Genre: Hard rock, power metal
- Label: Spinefarm Records

Twilightning chronology
Bedlam (2006)	Swinelords (2007)

Swinelords is the third and final studio album by Twilightning, released May 7, 2007, on the label Spinefarm Records.

== Track listing ==
1. "Isolation Shell" - 5:15
2. "Swinelord" - 4:09
3. "Reflection of the Cuckoo" - 4:42
4. "Vice Jesus" - 4:17
5. "Pimps, Witches, Thieves and Bitches" - 4:12
6. "The Gun" - 3:36
7. "Not a Word" - 3:54
8. "Consume Gap" - 4:09
9. "With the Flow" - 5:08
10. "Wounded and Withdrawn" - 5:26
11. "Maggots (Bonus Track)" - 4:06

== Personnel ==
- Tommi Sartanen – Guitars
- Ville Wallenius – Guitars
- Jussi Kainulainen – Bass guitars
- Juha Leskinen – Drums
- Heikki Pöyhiä – Vocals
