= Monika Pedersen =

Danish singer

- Also known as: Monnique Art
- Born: Monika Pedersen; 21 December 1978 (age 47)
- Origin: Skanderborg, Midtjylland, Denmark
- Genres: Progressive metal, gothic metal, neoclassical metal, country pop
- Occupations: Singer, painter
- Instrument: Vocals
- Years active: 1998–present
- Labels: Nuclear Blast
- Formerly of: Sinphonia, Sirenia, Mercenary
- Website: Monika's MySpace

Monika Pedersen (21 December 1978) is a Danish singer of the band Sinphonia and former vocalist of "The World State" and the Norwegian gothic metal band Sirenia, replacing Henriette Bordvik. She also contributed guest vocals to Mercenary, Effektor, Evil Masquerade, Manticora, and Ad Noctum.

== Discography ==
=== With The World State ===
- Flier EP – 2013
- "A Castle for the Battles that I Fight" (single) – 2013

=== With Sinphonia ===
- When the Tide Breaks – 2000
- The Divine Disharmony – 2002
- Silence (EP) – 2005

=== With Sirenia ===
- Nine Destinies and a Downfall – 2007

==== Singles ====
- My Mind's Eye

==== Music videos ====
- My Mind's Eye
- The Other Side

=== Guest appearances ===
- Mercenary – 11 Dreams (2004)
- Evil Masquerade – Theatrical Madness (2005)
