= At Sixes and Sevens =

Studio album by Sirenia
- Released: 13 August 2002
- Recorded: Sound Suite Studio, Marseille, France, 2001-2002
- Genres: Gothic metal, death-doom
- Length: 53:57
- Label: Napalm
- Producers: Terje Refsnes, Morten Veland

Sirenia chronology
At Sixes and Sevens (2002)	An Elixir for Existence (2004)

Professional ratings
Review scores
Source	Rating
Allmusic	4/5 stars
Metal Rules	5/5 stars
Metal Storm	9/10 stars

At Sixes and Sevens is the debut studio album by the Norwegian gothic metal band Sirenia, and their only album featuring the vocals of French singer Fabienne Gondamin. The woman on the cover is a Norwegian model, picked by the designer to represent a Siren.

== Title ==
"At sixes and sevens" is an English idiom very common in the United Kingdom. used to describe a condition of confusion or disarray.

The similar phrase "to set the world on six and seven", used by Geoffrey Chaucer, seems -in its context-, to mean "to hazard the world" or "to risk one's life".

It is something probable that the album title and its main track reflected Morten Veland's mood in that time. Similarly, a large number of the songs on this album and the next one of Sirenia refer to the disturbed mental conditions, a topic in which its writer was particularly interested.

== Recording ==
The album was pre-produced at the Veland's Stargoth Studios (after 2010 renamed as Audio Avenue Studios) in Tau, Norway mid 2001. Norwegian singers Cathrine Finnestad and Anette Gulbrandsen originally performed vocals on this preview version of the album, but their demos were not included in the final edition.

During November and December 2001, the instrumental section was recorded and mixed by Terje Refsnes - a close associate of Veland - in his personal studio recording, Sound Suite Studios in Marseille, France.

In 2002, the vocals of the mixed French symphonic choir (called the Sirenian Choir) were recorded, including session female lead singer -in this album only-, Fabienne Gondamin. Jan Kenneth Barkved from Stavanger band Elusive was also invited to record clean male vocals in four tracks.

It was mastered by Mika Jussila at the Finnvox Studios in Helsinki, Finland.

== Musical style ==
Sirenia's debut album is a continuation of Veland's compositional work with Tristania, a band that he had left only two years before, so it corresponds to the most classical gothic-symphonic metal style of his catalog. The band made use of contrasting vocals – male bass vocals (making some use of clean vocals and death grunts) and female whispering vocals, with interludes of a symphonic choir.

Lyrically, it has dark and long songs, with gothic and human existence themes (especially related to death and mental decline), in a complex structure of very similar metre and tempo among all, except the last one.

As is the usual in all Sirenia albums, Veland is the sole author of all the tracks, to which he gave a very introspective and personal character. Also he played most of the instruments that were used.

== Track listing ==
All songs written and composed by Morten Veland.

No.	Title	Length
1.	"Meridian"	6:20
2.	"Sister Nightfall"	5:38
3.	"On the Wane"	6:37
4.	"In a Manica"	6:03
5.	"At Sixes and Sevens"	6:46
6.	"Lethargica"	5:30
7.	"Manic Aeon"	6:26
8.	"A Shadow of Your Own Self"	5:58
9.	"In Sumerian Haze"	4:39
Total length:		53:57

== Personnel ==
Credits for At Sixes and Sevens adapted from liner notes.

Sirenia

- Morten Veland – harsh vocals (tracks 1–8), guitars, bass, keyboards, drum programming, mixing

Additional musicians

- Fabienne Gondamin – female vocals
- Kristian Gundersen – clean male vocals (tracks 4, 6, 8)
- Jan Kenneth Barkved – clean male vocals (tracks 2–4, 8, 9)
- Pete Johansen – violin (tracks 1–5, 7, 9)
- Damien Surian, Emilie Lesbros, Johanna Giraud, Hubert Piazzola – choir (tracks 1–8)

Production

- Terje Refsnes – mixing, engineering
- Tor Søreide – artwork, design
- Petter Hegre – photography
- Mika Jussila – mastering
- Emile Ashley – cover photography
