= Forever Still =

Danish modern rock band

- Origin: Copenhagen
- Genres: Modern rock; alternative metal; heavy metal; hard rock; gothic metal
- Years active: 2013–present
- Label: A Distant Light
- Members: Maja Shining; Mikkel Haastrup; Inuuteq Kleemann; Viktor Enebjörn
- Website: foreverstill.dk

Forever Still is a Danish modern rock band founded in 2013 in Copenhagen by Maja Shining and Mikkel Haastrup.

== History ==
They were formed in 2013, Copenhagen, where their first EP Breaking Free was released. In 2014 they released their second EP Scars. Everything that frontwoman Maja Shining and multi-instrumentalist Mikkel Haastrup achieved until now has been produced by the band members themselves. Over years they organized their tours, took photos, made their cover art and music videos as well as recorded, mixed and produced everything on their own. Tied Down was recorded together with Flemming Rasmussen, who formerly worked as a producer for Metallica.

After releasing their EP Save me in 2015, they toured in the United Kingdom and Italy. After that they released their first album Tied Down. In August 2016 they signed a worldwide contract with Nuclear Blast. Tied down was then re-released by their new label and nominated for a Metal Hammer Award for "best debut album". It was critically acclaimed and the band became even more popular.

In the fall of 2016 they were touring through Europe with the Italian metal band Lacuna Coil and in the spring of 2017 they toured with Children of Bodom. In 2017 they opened the main stage of Bloodstock Open Air. The band has since then played multiple festivals across Europe like Sabaton Open Air and Summer Breeze Open Air. In 2019 they released their second album "Breathe in Colours" via Nuclear Blast and in the fall of 2019 they toured the album with Cellar Darling and Beyond the Black throughout Europe. In the winter of 2019, they joined the Female Metal Voices Tour with Leaves' Eyes and Sirenia amongst others.

The band is currently finishing their third album The Line that was written during lock down. Maja and Mikkel, who are in charge of the songwriting in the band, gathered all the equipment they could get their hands on in the house and started writing a very different album for the band. Inspired by bands like Joy Division, Nine Inch Nails and The Cure, they began to explore a more minimalist sound with the old drum machines and analogues synthesizers they had gathered.

== Band members ==
Current line-up

- Maja Shining – vocals, piano, synth, theremin
- Mikkel Haastrup – bass, guitars, keyboards, synth

Live members

- Inuuteq Kleemann – guitar (live)
- Viktor Enebjörn - Drums (live)

== Discography ==
=== EPs ===
- 2013: Breaking Free
- 2014: Scars
- 2015: Save Me

=== Albums ===
- 2016: Tied Down
- 2019: Breathe in Colours
- 2023: The Line

=== Singles ===
- 2013: The Key
- 2013: The Last Day
- 2013: Towards the Edge
- 2014: Scars
- 2015: Awake the Fire
- 2016: Miss Madness
- 2016: Save Me
- 2016: Miss Madness (Acoustic)
- 2019: Rew1nd
- 2019: Breathe in Colours
- 2019: Is It Gone?
- 2019: Perfect Day (Lou Reed cover)
- 2022: Something Wrong
- 2022: Can't Begin To Explain
- 2023: Blackout
- 2023: Find a Way
- 2023: So Run
- 2023: Before I Die
