= Sirenia (band) =

Norwegian gothic metal band

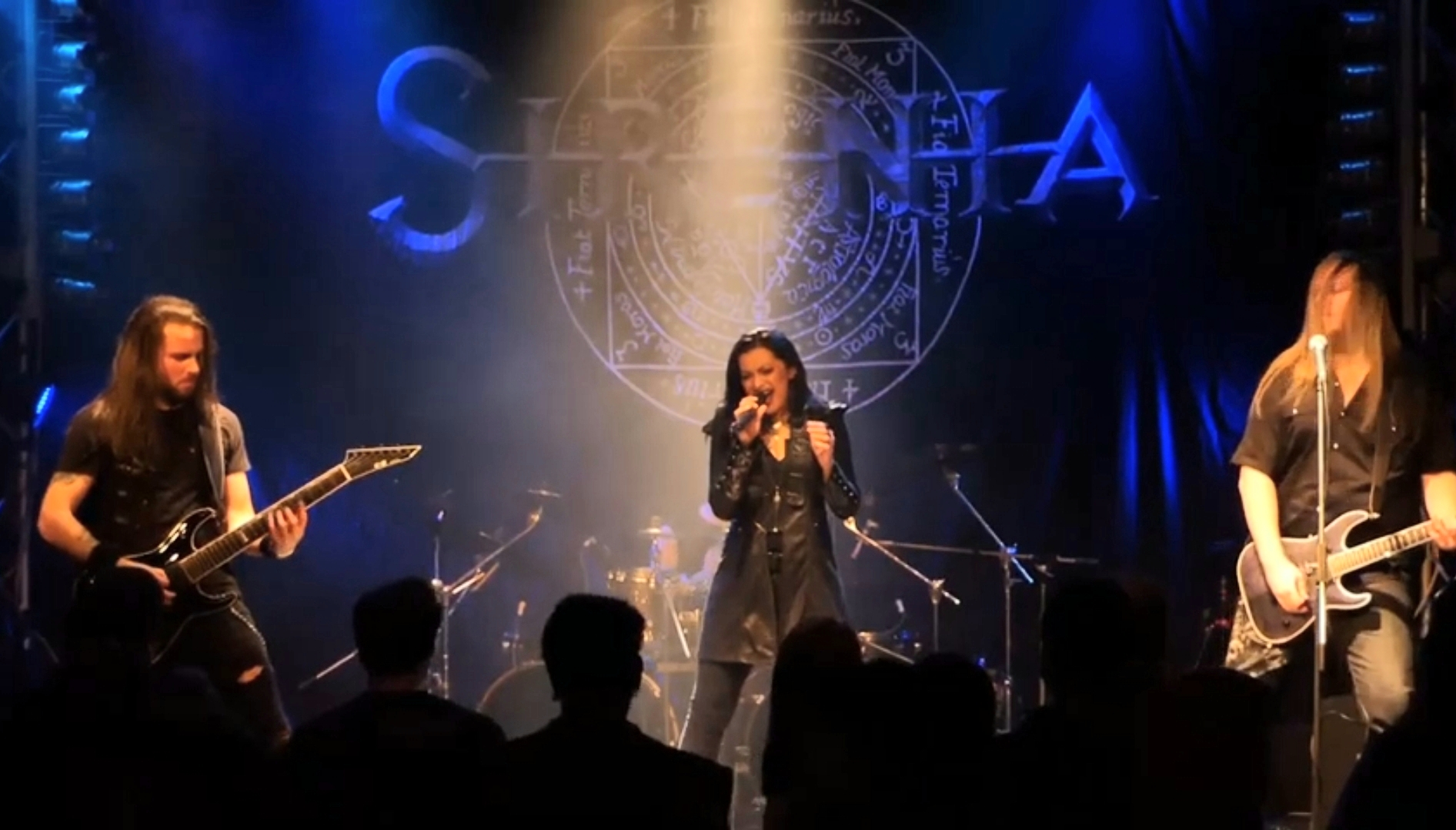
- Sirenia performing live in 2019

Background information
- Origin: Stavanger, Norway
- Genres: Gothic metal, symphonic metal
- Years active: 2001–present
- Labels: Napalm (2002–2005, 2014–present); Nuclear Blast (2005–2014)
- Members: Morten Veland; Emmanuelle Zoldan; Nils Courbaron; Michael Brush
- Past members: Fabienne Gondamin; Henriette Bordvik; Kristian Gundersen; Monika Pedersen; Bjørnar Landa; Michael S. Krumins; Ailyn; Jonathan Pérez; Jan Erik Soltvedt
- Website: mortenveland.com/sirenia

Sirenia is a Norwegian gothic metal band from Stavanger, founded in 2001 by Morten Veland.

The band uses melodic instrumentals, synthesizers, and distorted guitars with female vocals, male death vocals, clean male vocals, a choir, and violins. The lyrics are concerned with human existence, emotion, and mental states.

== History ==
=== 2001–2003: Formation and At Sixes and Sevens ===
In January 2001, Veland, a founding member of Tristania left the band, within a few weeks Veland had a new band along with three other members. He had written material for Tristania's next release but because of the split, he used it towards Sirenia's debut album At Sixes and Sevens with other new material written for it as well. The band entered the studio by November or December 2001. The band failed to find a suitable singer prior to recording in France, so they hired a session female singer named Fabienne Gondamin.

=== 2004–2007: An Elixir for Existence and Nine Destinies and a Downfall ===
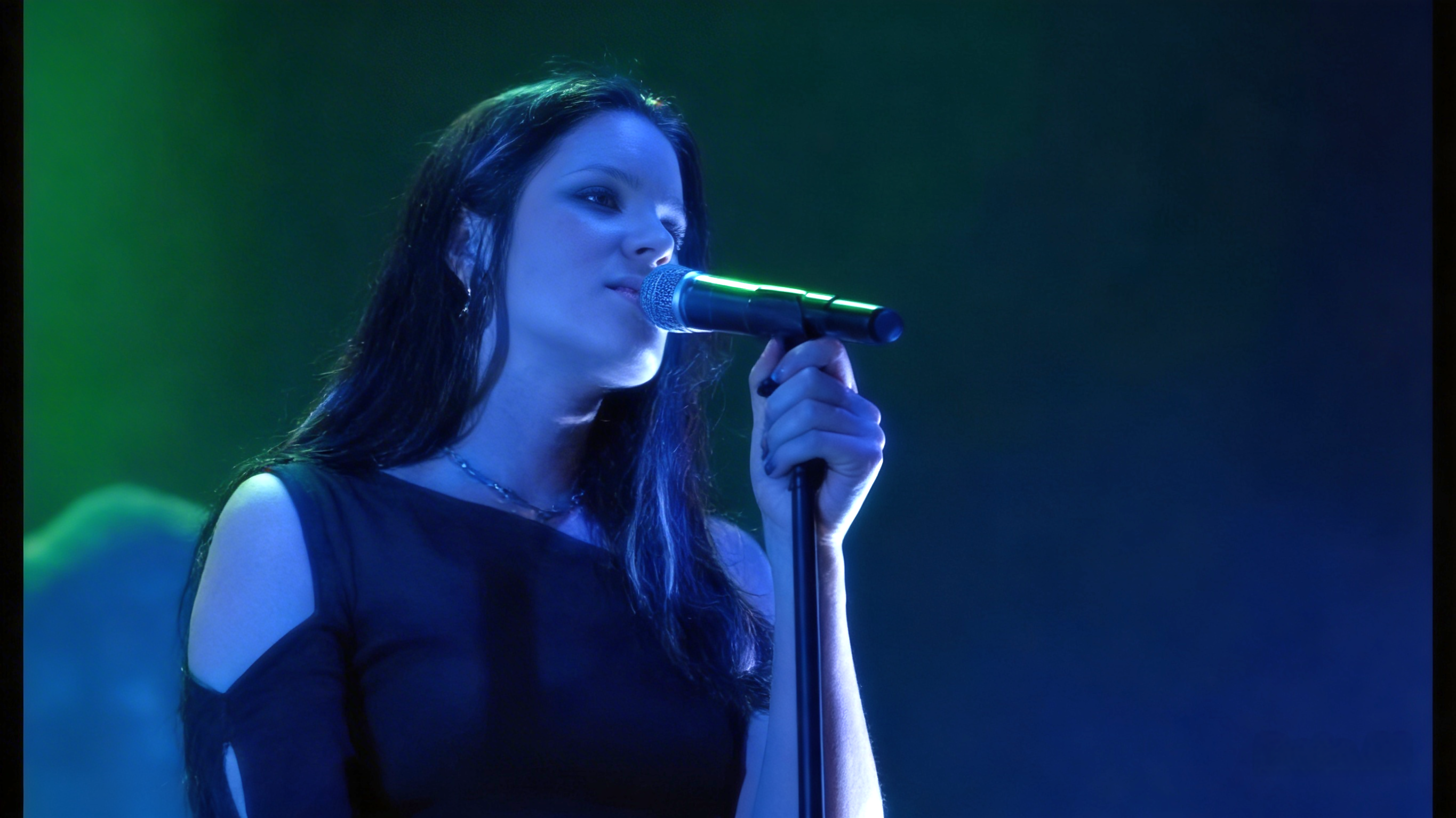
Henriette Bordvik in Inferno Metal Festival in 2003

On the subsequent tour Fabienne Gondamin was replaced by Henriette Bordvik, with whom the band recorded the album An Elixir for Existence and the EP Sirenian Shores.

The band signed with Nuclear Blast in May 2005.

In November 2005, Henriette Bordvik left the band, citing personal reasons.

In 2007 they released a third album – Nine Destinies and a Downfall. The album features new singer, Monika Pedersen from Denmark, who joined the band in April 2006, and new guitarist Bjørnar Landa (from Artifact), who joined the band during the recording.

On 5 November 2007 Monika Pedersen quit the band over musical disagreements. Her departure caused Sirenia to pull out of a planned European tour with Therion.

=== 2008–2011: The 13th Floor and The Enigma of Life ===
Sirenia began looking for a new singer in November 2007. The process in finding their newest member took about six months. About 500 applied, at the end they wanted to find someone from the EU region for practical reasons. On 9 April 2008 Sirenia announced Spanish X Factor contestant Ailyn as their new female vocalist.

On 19 May 2008 it was announced that Bjørnar Landa left the band in order to have more time for his family and studies. He was replaced by Michael S. Krumins (Green Carnation).

On 12 June 2008 Sirenia announced that for the first time in their career, they had decided to work with a bass player for their live shows. The session bass player would be Kristian Olav Torp.

Sirenia started recording their fourth album in July 2008. It was recorded in Sound Suite Studios, France and Stargoth Studios, Norway. The mixing and mastering took place in Antfarm Studios, Denmark with Tue Madsen. The album, called The 13th Floor, was completed in September and the release date was 23 January 2009. The album features guest appearances by Jan Kenneth Barkved. The first single, "The Path to Decay", was released on 26 December 2008 as a digital download.

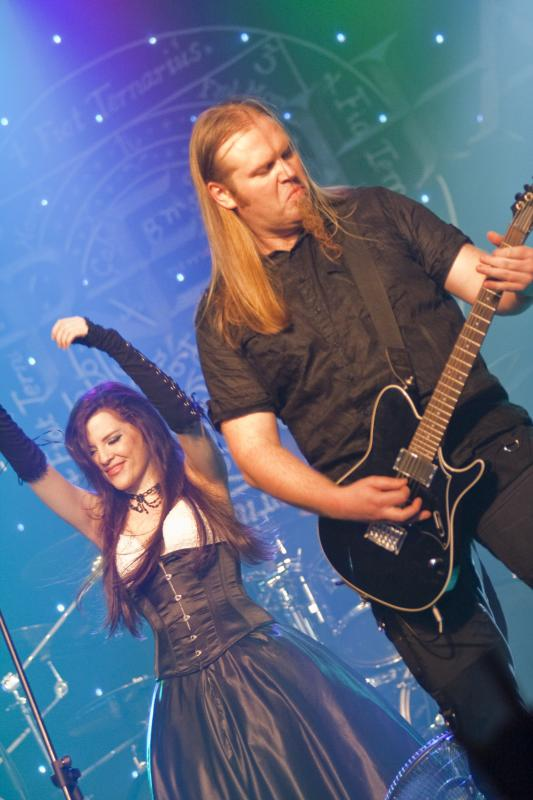
Ailyn and Morten Veland in March 2010

On 8 July 2010, the band announced that they had started recording a new album. It was finished in November, and is titled The Enigma of Life. It was released on 21 January 2011.

The first single, "The End of It All", was released on 21 December 2010 as a digital download.

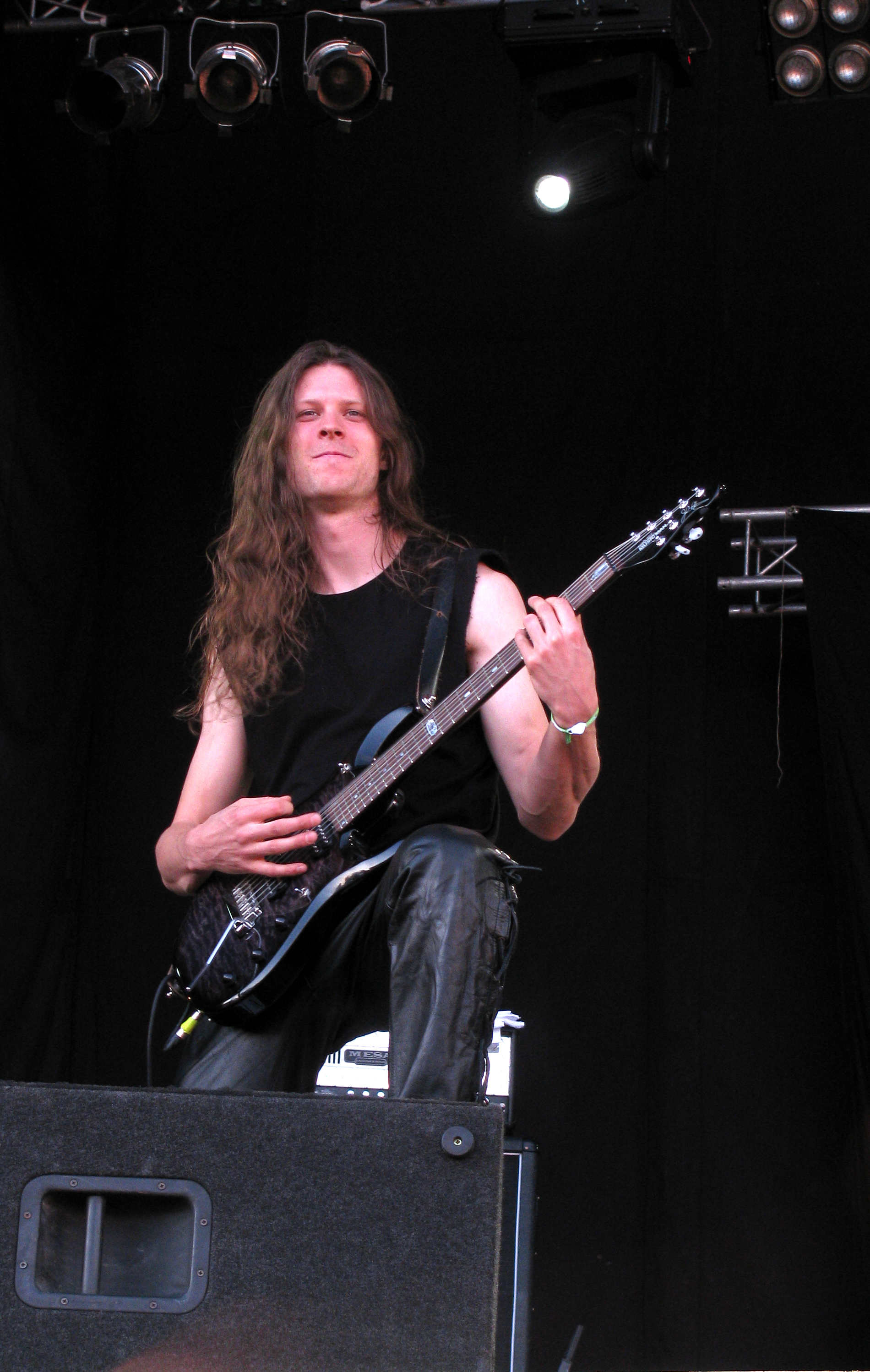
Michael S. Krumins in Global East Rock Festival in September 2010

On 19 April 2011, Michael left Sirenia to put in more time on his own bands and projects. Jan Erik Soltvedt joined the band and filled in as the lead guitarist. Soltvedt accompanied Sirenia on their American and European tours in 2011, including the Gallus Sonorus Musicallis festival (GSM Fest) held in June 2011 in Barcelos, Portugal, and the Wacken Festival in Germany, held in August.

On 16 July 2011, one of their most important performances of that year was held at the famous heavy metal festival Masters of Rock, which takes place annually in the city of Vizovice, Czech Republic. Their only former appearance at the festival was in 2008.

By the end of July and the beginning of August 2011, Sirenia made their second Latin American tour, which took them back to countries such as Mexico, Brazil, Argentina and for the first time to Peru and Chile in October.

=== 2012–2016: Perils of the Deep Blue, The Seventh Life Path and Ailyn's departure ===
On 16 October 2012 Sirenia announced that they had entered the studio to record their next album for an early 2013 release. The band said of the album "The progress on the new album is going very well — we feel confident that the sixth Sirenia album will have some nice surprises up its sleeve, as we've been determined to make this record somewhat different from the previous two albums".

On 13 April 2013 the band announced the title of their album on their Facebook page: Perils of the Deep Blue. Their single "Seven Widows Weep" was released through Nuclear Blast on 12 May 2013. On 3 June 2013, the official music video of the song was released. It was filmed in April of the same year in Serbia by iCODE Team.

Perils of the Deep Blue represented the first Sirenia album in US charts, such as the Billboard Hard Rock Albums and the Heatseekers Albums.

The band announced they had returned to Napalm Records on 3 April 2014 with a pending album release for early 2015. On 10 February 2015 Sirenia announced the title of their next record called The Seventh Life Path. On 12 March 2015 the band announced on their Facebook page that Nightwatcher Films has signed Sirenia for the use of their song "Ducere Me In Lucem" of Perils of the Deep Blue for the opening title sequence of a film called Abandoned Dead, penned for release January 2016.

On 5 July 2016 Sirenia announced that after 8 years, Ailyn and the band were parting on good terms, but that the work with the upcoming album would proceed as normal. The same day, Ailyn released a statement disputing the band's claim, saying that the decision was not hers and she was not a part of it.

=== 2016–2020: Dim Days of Dolor, new singer and Arcane Astral Aeons ===
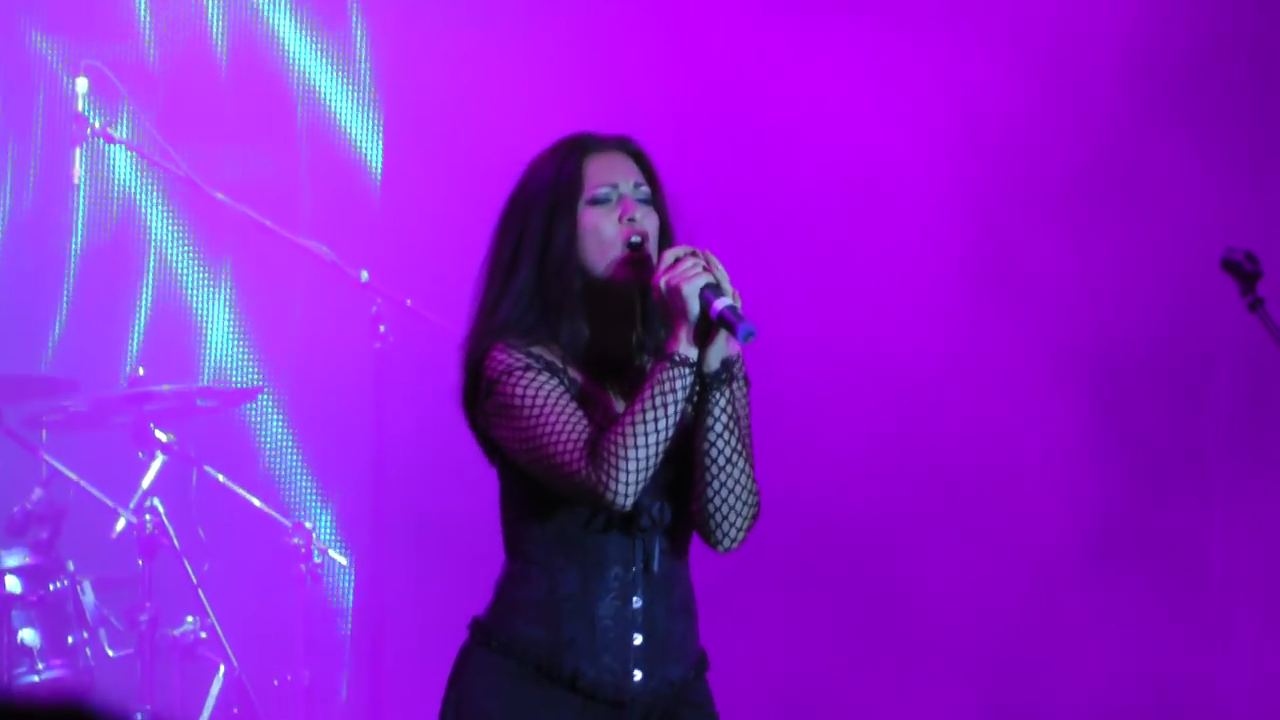
Emmanuelle Zoldan performing live in Kherson, Ukraine, in June 2016

On 29 August 2016 Sirenia revealed their eighth full-length album Dim Days of Dolor before their official announcement of their new singer.

On 8 September 2016 Sirenia announced their new singer Emmanuelle Zoldan, a French mezzo-soprano singer from Aix-en-Provence who had worked with Sirenia for 13 years as part of The Sirenian Choir. She had already contributed the lead vocals for the Sirenian Shores EP cover of "First We Take Manhattan" by Leonard Cohen.

Sirenia toured with Arkona and MindMaze in May 2017 for their debut in the United States and Canada.

In October 2017 before a European tour, French guitarist Nils Courbaron was unexpectedly invited to participate in the live performances, replacing Jan Erik Soltvedt. In November, longtime drummer Jonathan Pérez left the band and joined Green Carnation. Following this, Sirenia temporarily included Austrian drummer Roland Navratil, a live member who had performed with the band before.

The band returned to North America to join various bands on the heavy metal cruise, 70000 Tons of Metal for two shows on 2 and 3 February 2018.

Sirenia toured North America for the second time with Canadian metal band Threat Signal in April 2018, with support from Valinor Excelsior, Graveshadow, Niviane and Dire Peril.

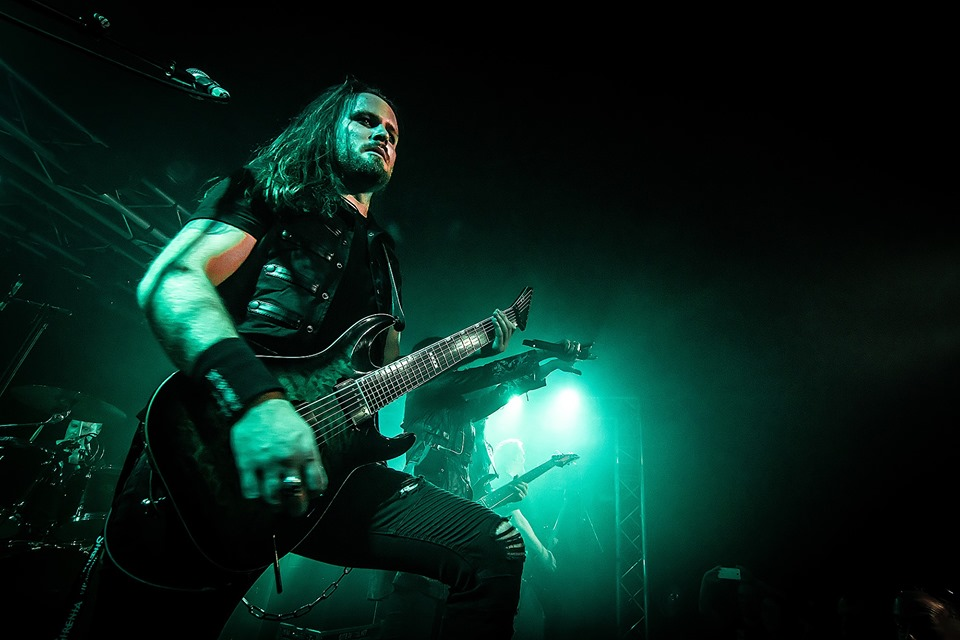
Nils Courbaron in La Boule Noire, Paris, November 2018

On 14 August 2018, Sirenia had revealed the title of their ninth studio album Arcane Astral Aeons, along with a European tour in the fall. The album was released 26 October of the same year.

A lyric video was made for the single "Love Like Cyanide" released on 21 September 2018. The song features a guest appearance by Yannis Papadopoulos from Finnish band Beast in Black. On 12 October, "Into the Night" was released as the second single, followed by a music video. Both videos were directed by Swedish filmmaker and musician Owe Lingvall.

In the fall of 2019, Sirenia went on an extensive European tour with bands such as Leaves' Eyes, Forever Still and Lost in Grey. During the tour, a new official member was introduced, British drummer Michael Brush from Magic Kingdom.

=== 2020–present: Riddles, Ruins & Revelations, 1977 and Amanita Messis ===
On 8 December 2020, Sirenia announced the title of their tenth studio album Riddles, Ruins & Revelations, with the release of their first single off of the album, "Addiction No. 1". The album was released on 12 February 2021. The second single off of the album, "We Come to Ruins", was released on 12 January 2021. On 10 February 2021, the band released their third single off of the album which is a cover of Desireless' "Voyage, voyage". The tenth album was a remarkable stylistic shift for Sirenia, adding synth-pop to their usual symphonic metal musical style, opting for a more commercial bet.

On 22 March 2023, the band simultaneously announced the first single which is a cover of English singer Tanita Tikaram's "Twist in My Sobriety". It is the first single that was featured on the eleventh studio album, 1977, which was released on 26 May 2023. The other two singles were "Deadlight" and "Wintry Heart". The album followed in the same vein as the previous Riddles, Ruins & Revelations, but with a style influenced by the rock bands of the 70s-80s.

On 10 October 2025, the band released the single, "Nightside Den", which is the first single from their upcoming twelfth studio album, Amanita Messis.

== Band members ==
=== Current ===
- Morten Veland – guitars, harsh vocals, other instruments on studio (2001–present), live bass (2018–2020)
- Emmanuelle Zoldan – female vocals (2016–present), choir on studio (2003–present)

=== Former ===
- Kristian Gundersen – guitars and clean vocals (live only) (2001–2004)
- Henriette Bordvik – female vocals (2003–2005)
- Monika Pedersen – female vocals (2006–2007)
- Michael S. Krumins – guitars and harsh vocals (live only) (2008–2011)
- Ailyn – female vocals (2008–2016)

=== Live ===
- Bjørnar Landa – guitars (2004–2008)
- Kristian Olav Torp – bass (2008)
- Roland Navratil – drums (2004–2005, 2009, 2017)
- Jonathan A. Perez – drums (2003–2017)
- Jan Erik Soltvedt – guitars (2011–2020)
- Nils Courbaron – guitars (2018–present)
- Michael Brush – drums (2018–present)

=== The Sirenian Choir ===
- Damien Surian – choir on studio (2001–present)
- Mathieu Landry – choir on studio (2003–present)
- Emilie Bernou – choir on studio (2012–present)

=== Former Sirenian Choir ===
- Johanna Giraud – sirenian choir (2001–2004)
- Hubert Piazzola – sirenian choir (2001–2004)
- Emilie Lesbros – sirenian choir (2001–2010)
- Sandrine Gouttebel – sirenian choir (2003–2010)

=== Session ===
- Fabienne Gondamin – vocals (2001–2002)
- Pete Johansen – violin (2001–2002)
- Anne Verdot – violin (2003–2004)
- Jan Kenneth Barkved – clean vocals (2001–2002, 2008; died 2009)
- Stephanie Valentin – violin (2008–2010, 2018)
- Joakim Næss – clean vocals (2012–2016, 2021)

== Discography ==
=== Studio albums ===
Title	Album details	Peak chart positions								Sales
Title	Album details	BEL (Fla)	BEL (Wal)	FRA	GER	SWI	UK Rock	US Heat	US Hard Rock	Sales
At Sixes and Sevens	Released: 13 August 2002; Label: Napalm	—	—	—	—	—	—	—	—	
An Elixir for Existence	Released: 3 August 2004; Label: Napalm	—	—	—	—	—	—	—	—	
Nine Destinies and a Downfall	Released: 23 February 2007; Label: Nuclear Blast	—	—	134	54	85	—	—	—	
The 13th Floor	Released: 23 January 2009; Label: Nuclear Blast	—	—	127	87	67	—	—	—	US: 500+
The Enigma of Life	Released: 21 January 2011; Label: Nuclear Blast	—	—	—	73	53	—	—	—	US: 730+
Perils of the Deep Blue	Released: 28 June 2013; Label: Nuclear Blast	98	89	136	50	43	11	20	97	US: 1,560+
The Seventh Life Path	Released: 8 May 2015; Label: Napalm	198	122	—	68	77	—	18	—	US: 1,300+
Dim Days of Dolor	Released: 11 November 2016; Label: Napalm	—	150	—	—	89	34	—	25	
Arcane Astral Aeons	Released: 26 October 2018; Label: Napalm	131	150	—	—	80	—	—	—	
Riddles, Ruins & Revelations	Released: 12 February 2021; Label: Napalm	—	—	—	89	18	—	—	—	
1977	Released: 26 May 2023; Label: Napalm	—	—	—	—	78	—	—	—	
"—" denotes releases that did not chart or was not released.

=== Extended plays ===
- Sirenian Shores (2004)

=== Singles and promo singles ===
- "My Mind's Eye" (2007) (Promo single)
- "The Path to Decay" (2008)
- "The End of It All" (2010)
- "Seven Widows Weep" (2013)
- "Once My Light" (2015)
- "The 12th Hour" (2016)
- "Dim Days of Dolor" (2016)
- "Love Like Cyanide" (2018)
- "Into the Night" (2018)
- "Addiction No. 1" (2020)
- "We Come to Ruins" (2021)
- "Voyage, voyage" (2021, Desireless cover)
- "Twist in My Sobriety" (2023, Tanita Tikaram cover)
- "Nightside Den" (2025)

=== Music videos ===
Year	Title	Director(s)
2007	"My Mind's Eye"	iCODE Team
2007	"The Other Side"	iCODE Team
2008	"The Path to Decay"	Patric Ullaeus
2011	"The End of It All"	Patric Ullaeus
2013	"Seven Widows Weep"	iCODE Team
2015	"Once My Light"	iCODE Team
2016	"Dim Days of Dolor"	Owe Lingvall
2018	"Into the Night"	Owe Lingvall
2020	"Addiction No. 1"	iCODE Team
2021	"Voyage, voyage" (Desireless cover)	—N/a
2023	"Twist in My Sobriety" (Tanita Tikaram cover)	—N/a
2023	"Deadlight"	Cécile Delpoïo, Pierre Troestler
