= An Elixir for Existence =

- Cover art by Joachim Luetke

Studio album by Sirenia
- Released: August 3, 2004
- Recorded: Stargoth Studios, Tau, Norway; Sound Suite Studio, Marseille, France; September and October 2003
- Genre: Gothic metal, death-doom
- Length: 53:44
- Label: Napalm
- Producer: Terje Refsnes, Morten Veland

Sirenia chronology
At Sixes and Sevens (2002)	An Elixir for Existence (2004)	Sirenian Shores (2004)

Professional ratings
Review scores
Source	Rating
Metal Storm	8.5/10 stars

An Elixir for Existence is the second studio album by the Norwegian gothic metal band Sirenia, released in 2004. The album follows in the same vein as the previous At Sixes and Sevens, but includes a new female vocalist, Henriette Bordvik. From this album, Sirenia has been presented as a 4-piece band, with Morten Veland as the only permanent member.

== Musical style ==
Like its predecessor album At Sixes and Sevens (2002), the musical style in An Elixir for Existence corresponds to the more classic Sirenia's gothic metal of their origins, with some elements of symphonic death-doom.

A large number of the songs are concerned with mental conditions, be it depression ("Voices Within"), drug use ("Euphoria") or thoughts of suicide ("The Fall Within"); of course, the meanings of all of these songs are subject to further conjecture.

== Track listing ==
All songs written by Morten Veland.

No.	Title	Length
1.	"Lithium and a Lover"	6:33
2.	"Voices Within"	6:52
3.	"A Mental Symphony"	5:25
4.	"Euphoria"	6:35
5.	"In My Darkest Hours"	6:04
6.	"Save Me from Myself"	4:14
7.	"The Fall Within"	6:48
8.	"Star-Crossed"	6:28
9.	"Seven Sirens and a Silver Tear" (Instrumental)	4:45
Total length:		53:44

== Personnel ==
Credits for An Elixir for Existence adapted from liner notes.

Sirenia

- Morten Veland – harsh vocals (tracks 1–5, 7, 8), guitars, bass, keyboards, drum programming, mixing
- Henriette Bordvik – female vocals (tracks 1–8)

Additional personnel

- Kristian Gundersen – clean male vocals (tracks 3, 4, 7)
- Anne Verdot – violin (tracks 2–4, 6)
- Damien Surian, Mathieu Landry, Emmanuelle Zoldan, Sandrine Gouttebel, Emilie Lesbros – choir (tracks 1–5, 7–9)

Production

- Joachim Luetke – cover art, artwork
- Terje Refsnes – mixing, engineering
- Emile M.E. Ashley – photography
- Ulf Horbelt – mastering
- Wolfgang Voglhuber – photography
