= A Dark Poem, Pt. III: The Messiah Complex =

Studio album by Green Carnation
- Released: 5 September 2026
- Recorded: 2024–2025
- Genres: Gothic metal; progressive doom
- Length: 38:25
- Label: Season of Mist

Green Carnation chronology
A Dark Poem, Pt. II: Sanguis (2026)	A Dark Poem, Pt. III: The Messiah Complex (2026)

Singles from A Dark Poem, Pt. III: The Messiah Complex
- 1. "Unconditional Artificial Chemistry" Released: 24 June 2026; 2. "The Messiah Complex" Released: 29 July 2026

Professional ratings
Review scores
Source	Rating
Ghost Cult Magazine	9/10
Metal Temple	10/10
Sonic Perspectives	9.8/10

A Dark Poem, Pt. III: The Messiah Complex is the ninth full-length studio album by Norwegian progressive metal band Green Carnation. It was released on 5 September 2026 via Season of Mist. It is the final album in a trilogy of albums titled A Dark Poem. The album has the shortest number of tracks since their 2001 one-track album Light of Day, Day of Darkness, with three songs that are each over six minutes in length, and a nearly 17-minute orchestral suite performed by the Kristiansand Symphony Orchestra.

== Track listing ==
No.	Title	Length
1.	"Unconditional Artificial Chemistry"	6:05
2.	"The Messiah Complex"	6:48
3.	"Broken Souls, Common Enemies"	8:45
4.	"A Dark Poem - Orchestral Suite" (performed by the Kristiansand Symphony Orchestra)	16:47
Total length:		38:25

== Personnel ==
- Kjetil Nordhus – vocals
- Terje Vik Schei (Tchort) – guitars
- Bjørn "Berserk" Harstad – guitars
- Stein Roger Sordal – bass
- Endre Kirkesola – keyboards
- Jonathan Pérez – drums

== Charts ==
Chart performance for A Dark Poem, Pt. III: The Messiah Complex
Chart (2026)	Peak position
Norwegian Physical Albums (IFPI Norge)	4
UK Album Downloads (Official Charts)	68
