= Leaves of Yesteryear =

Studio album by Green Carnation
- Released: May 8, 2020
- Recorded: 2019
- Genre: Doom metal; gothic metal; progressive metal
- Length: 44:36
- Label: Season of Mist
- Producer: Green Carnation, Endre Kirkesola

Green Carnation chronology
Acoustic Verses (2006)	Leaves of Yesteryear (2020)	A Dark Poem, Pt. I: The Shores of Melancholia (2025)

Leaves of Yesteryear is the sixth full-length studio album by the Norwegian progressive metal band Green Carnation. It was released on May 8, 2020, via Season of Mist.

This album represents the return of the band after fourteen years of absence from the recording studios. It includes a cover of the Black Sabbath ballad "Solitude", from their album Master of Reality (1971), as well as a new version of "My Dark Reflections of Life and Death" that originally appeared on their 2000 debut album, Journey to the End of the Night.

It is the first studio album with experienced Chilean drummer Jonathan Pérez (ex-Sirenia, ex-Trail of Tears) a live band member since 2016.

== Reception ==
Professional ratings
Review scores
Source	Rating
Blabbermouth.net	(Avg:8/10)
Distorted Sound	(Avg:8/10)
Metal Injection	(Avg:9/10)
Metal Storm	(Avg:8/10)
Sonic Perspectives	(Avg:9/10)

The album was met with positive reviews from music critics. Blabbermouth.net rated it with an 8 and describes it "(the band) has returned and settled into a gothic prog metal format on Leaves of Yesteryear, a solid album which is ripe with the qualities, dynamics and diversity that longtime followers would expect and crave". Licia Mapelli of Tuonela Magazine wrote an unrated yet positive track-by-track review of the album.

== Background ==
According to Tchort's writings in the booklet to Acoustic Verses in 2006, Green Carnation's next studio release was going to be the second part of "The Chronicles of Doom" trilogy, which began with Light of Day, Day of Darkness, and was going to be titled The Rise and Fall of Mankind, with an undetermined release date.

However, the announced album title was eventually discarded and its lyrical content was changed for unknown reasons after the group's long break. Instead, the new title and lyrics suggest a return to the band's earlier progressive doom roots, with songs composed mostly by the well-known formula of the duo of Tchort and Stein Roger Sordal.

== Track listing ==
No.	Title	Lyrics	Length
1.	"Leaves of Yesteryear"	Stein Roger Sordal	8:04
2.	"Sentinels"	Stein Roger Sordal	5:43
3.	"My Dark Reflections of Life and Death" (re-recording of song from Journey to the End of the Night)	Tchort	15:37
4.	"Hounds"	Stein Roger Sordal	10:10
5.	"Solitude" (Black Sabbath cover)	Bill Ward, Ozzy Osbourne, Geezer Butler, Tony Iommi	5:06
Total length:			44:36

== Personnel ==
Green Carnation

- Kjetil Nordhus – vocals
- Terje Vik Schei (a.k.a. Tchort) – guitars
- Michael Smith Krumins – guitars
- Stein Roger Sordal – bass guitar, guitars
- Kenneth Silden – keyboards
- Jonathan Pérez – drums
- Bjørn "Berserk" Harstad – guitars

== Recording information ==
- Produced by Endre Kirkesola and Green Carnation
- Mastered at Maor Appelbaum Mastering, California, U.S.A.
- Artwork by Niklas Sundin
