= A Dark Poem, Pt. II: Sanguis =

Studio album by Green Carnation
- Released: 3 April 2026
- Recorded: April–December 2024
- Genres: Doom metal; gothic metal; progressive metal
- Length: 37:14
- Label: Season of Mist
- Producers: Kjetil Nordhus, Stein Roger Sordal, Endre Kirkesola

Green Carnation chronology
A Dark Poem, Pt. I: The Shores of Melancholia (2025)	A Dark Poem, Pt. II: Sanguis (2026)	A Dark Poem, Pt. III: The Messiah Complex (2026)

Singles from A Dark Poem, Pt. II: Sanguis
- 1. "Sanguis (Blood Ties)" Released: 5 February 2026; 2. "I Am Time" Released: 17 March 2026

Professional ratings
Review scores
Source	Rating
Blabbermouth.net	8/10
New Noise Magazine	5/5 stars
Sonic Perspectives	8.8/10
Sputnikmusic	4.2/5

A Dark Poem, Pt. II: Sanguis is the eighth full-length studio album by the Norwegian progressive metal band Green Carnation. It was released on 3 April 2026 via Season of Mist. It is the second album in a trilogy of albums titled A Dark Poem. Vocalist Kjetil Nordhus has stated that the album is lyrically "more introspective and personal, whereas Part I is more about society and things outside of ourselves."

== Track listing ==
No.	Title	Length
1.	"Sanguis"	9:05
2.	"Loneliness Untold, Loneliness Unfold"	4:04
3.	"Sweet to the Point of Bitter"	5:58
4.	"I Am Time"	5:39
5.	"Fire in Ice"	7:03
6.	"Lunar Tale" (featuring Ingrid Ose on flute)	5:25
Total length:		37:14

== Personnel ==
Green Carnation

- Kjetil Nordhus – vocals
- Terje Vik Schei (Tchort) – guitars
- Bjørn "Berserk" Harstad – guitars
- Stein Roger Sordal – bass, additional guitars and keyboards, lead vocals on track 2
- Endre Kirkesola – keyboards, organ, effects, backing vocals on track 6
- Jonathan Pérez – drums

== Recording information ==
- Produced by Kjetil Nordhus, Stein Roger Sordal, and Endre Kirkesola
- Recorded, mixed, and mastered at DUB Studios
- Artwork by Niklas Sundin

== Charts ==
Chart performance for A Dark Poem, Pt. II: Sanguis
Chart (2026)	Peak position
French Rock & Metal Albums (SNEP)	78
Norwegian Physical Albums (IFPI Norge)	3
