= Tchort =

Norwegian musician

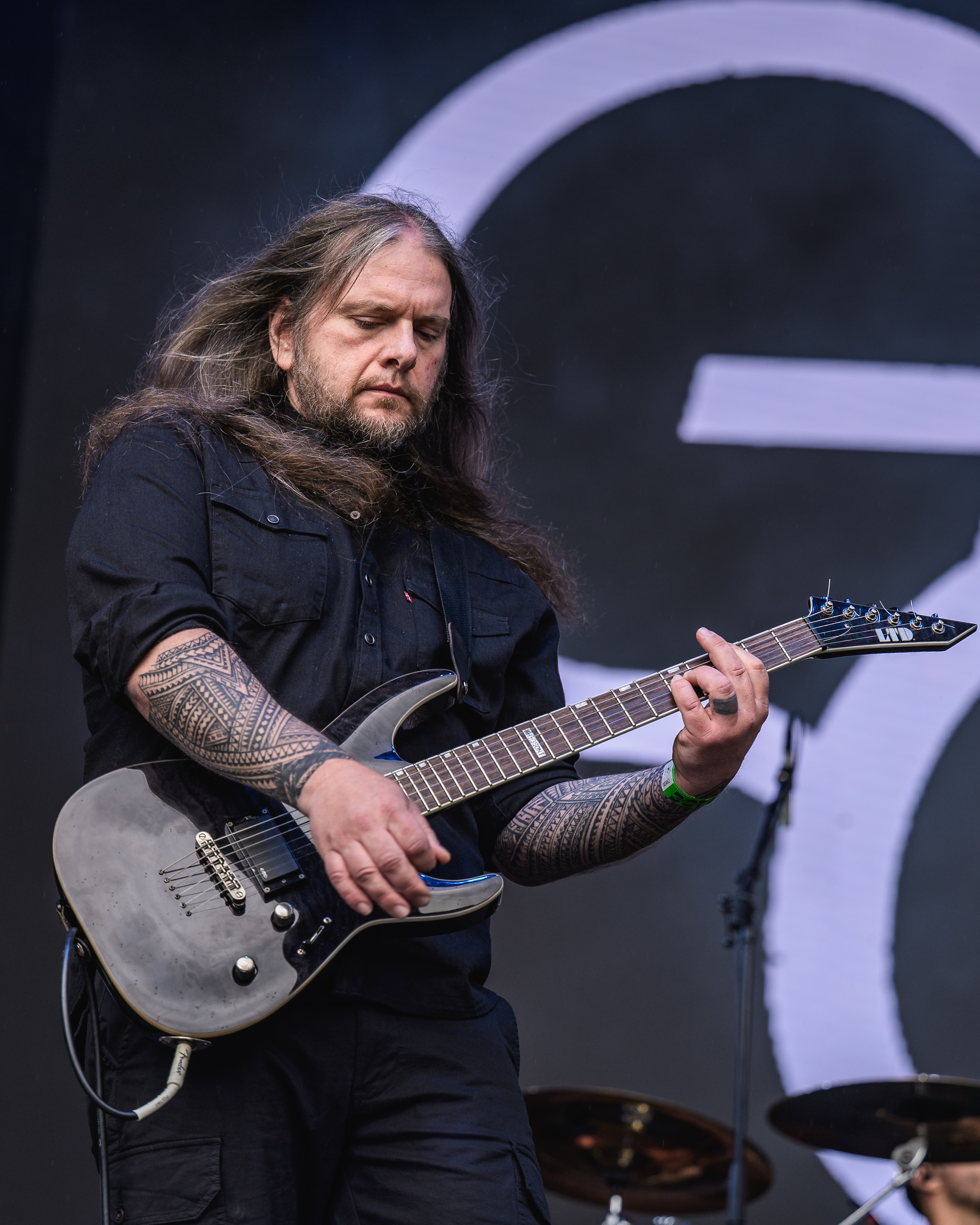

Background information
- Born: Terje Vik Schei; 7 July 1974 (age 52); Kristiansand, Norway
- Genres: Black metal, progressive metal, progressive rock
- Occupation: Musician
- Instruments: Bass guitar, guitar
- Years active: 1991–present
- Member of: Green Carnation, The 3rd Attempt
- Formerly of: Emperor, Carpathian Forest, Blood Red Throne

Terje Vik Schei (born 7 July 1974), better known by his stage name Tchort, is a Norwegian musician. He is known for his time spent playing bass for the black metal band Emperor and for leading the progressive metal band Green Carnation. He has also played with Carpathian Forest and Blood Red Throne, Satyricon and Einherjer. Tchort is known to be married and to have a son and a daughter.

Tchort is a Slavonic word (Russian Чёрт, Czech and Slovak Čert, Ukrainian and Belarusian Чорт, Polish Czort or Czart) meaning Devil.

He was arrested in the early/mid 1990s for assault and was in prison for two years.

Tchort with fellow Green Carnation performer Kjetil Nordhus, established his own record label, Sublife Productions in Kristiansand, Norway, on 1 July 2005. The label has already signed Green Carnation, Chain Collector, and Harm, and are looking to sign more.

Sublife Productions also acts as a booking agent for these artists as well as Carpathian Forest and Blood Red Throne.

The company is also turning its eye to cover design, and has stated that "various artists will present their work on Sublifeproductions.com in the near future".

== Discography ==
- Green Carnation – Hallucinations of Despair (1991) Demo
- Emperor – In the Nightside Eclipse (1994)
- Green Carnation – Journey to the End of The Night (1999) − CD
- Carpathian Forest – Strange Old Brew (2000)
- Blood Red Throne – Monument of Death (2001)
- Carpathian Forest – Morbid Fascination of Death (2001)
- Green Carnation – Light of Day, Day of Darkness (2001)
- Blood Red Throne – Affiliated With the Suffering (2003)
- Carpathian Forest – Defending the Throne of Evil (2003)
- Green Carnation – A Blessing in Disguise (2003)
- Carpathian Forest – We're Going to Hollywood for This – Live Perversions DVD (2004)
- Green Carnation – The Trilogy (2004) − Box set
- Green Carnation – Alive and Well... In Krakow (2004) − DVD
- Blood Red Throne – Altered Genesis (2005)
- Green Carnation – The Quiet Offspring (2005)
- Green Carnation – The Burden Is Mine... Alone (2005) − EP
- Carpathian Forest – Fuck You All!!!! Caput tuum in ano est (2006)
- Green Carnation – The Acoustic Verses (2006)
- Blood Red Throne – Come Death (2007)
- Green Carnation – A Night Under the Dam (2007) − DVD
- Blood Red Throne – Souls of Damnation (2009)
- Green Carnation – Leaves of Yesteryear (2020)
- Green Carnation - A Dark Poem, Pt. I: The Shores of Melancholia (2025)
- Green Carnation - A Dark Poem, Pt. II: Sanguis (2026)
