= The Trilogy (album) =

2004 box set by Norwegian band Green Carnation

Box set by Green Carnation
- Released: 2004
- Genre: Progressive metal, doom metal, gothic metal
- Length: 186:37
- Label: Season of Mist
- Producer: Green Carnation

Green Carnation chronology
A Blessing in Disguise (2003)	The Trilogy (2004)	Alive and Well... In Krakow (2004)

Professional ratings
Review scores
Source	Rating
Vampire Magazine	(favorable)

The Trilogy is a 2004 LP boxset containing the albums Journey to the End of The Night, Light of Day, Day of Darkness and A Blessing in Disguise created by the Norwegian progressive metal band, Green Carnation. The box set is limited to only three hundred and thirty-three copies.

== Track listing ==
=== Journey to the End of the Night ===
1. "Falling into Darkness" − 2:33
2. "In The Realm of the Midnight Sun" − 13:42
3. "My Dark Reflections of Life and Death" − 17:50
4. "Under Eternal Stars − 15:31"
5. "Journey to the End of Night (Part I)" − 11:28
6. "Echoes of Despair (Part II)" − 2:30
7. "End of Journey (Part III)" − 5:08
8. "Shattered (Part IV)" − 1:34

=== Light of Day, Day of Darkness ===
1. "Light of Day, Day of Darkness" – 60:06 1

=== A Blessing in Disguise ===
1. "Crushed to Dust" – 4:26
2. "Lullaby in Winter" – 7:49
3. "Writings on the Wall" – 5:26
4. "Into Deep" – 6:09
5. "The Boy in the Attic" – 7:13
6. "Two Seconds in Life" – 6:28
7. "Myron and Cole" – 5:53
8. "As Life Flows By" – 4:45
9. "Rain" – 8:06

== Credits ==
- Journey to the End of the Night
- Light of Day, Day of Darkness
- A Blessing in Disguise
