= A Dark Poem, Pt. I: The Shores of Melancholia =

Studio album by Green Carnation
- Released: 5 September 2025
- Recorded: April–December 2024
- Genres: Doom metal; gothic metal; progressive metal
- Length: 42:43
- Label: Season of Mist
- Producers: Kjetil Nordhus, Stein Roger Sordal, Endre Kirkesola

Green Carnation chronology
Leaves of Yesteryear (2020)	A Dark Poem, Pt. I: The Shores of Melancholia (2025)	A Dark Poem, Pt. II: Sanguis (2026)

Singles from A Dark Poem, Pt. I: The Shores of Melancholia
- 1. "In Your Paradise" Released: 8 July 2025; 2. "The Shores of Melancholia" Released: 29 August 2025

Professional ratings
Review scores
Source	Rating
Louder Sound	4/5
Sonic Perspectives	9/10

A Dark Poem, Pt. I: The Shores of Melancholia is the seventh full-length studio album by the Norwegian progressive metal band Green Carnation. It was released on 5 September 2025 via Season of Mist. It is the first album in a trilogy of albums titled A Dark Poem. Singles and music videos were released for "In Your Paradise" and the title track.

It was elected by Loudwire as one of the 11 best progressive metal albums of 2025.

== Track listing ==
No.	Title	Length
1.	"As Silence Took You"	7:12
2.	"In Your Paradise"	7:04
3.	"Me, My Enemy"	7:17
4.	"The Slave That You Are" (featuring Grutle Kjellson)	6:16
5.	"The Shores of Melancholia"	5:38
6.	"Too Close to the Flame"	9:16
Total length:		42:43

== Personnel ==
Green Carnation

- Kjetil Nordhus – vocals
- Terje Vik Schei (Tchort) – guitars
- Bjørn "Berserk" Harstad – guitars
- Stein Roger Sordal – bass, additional guitars and keyboards
- Endre Kirkesola – keyboards
- Jonathan Pérez – drums

== Recording information ==
- Produced by Kjetil Nordhus, Stein Roger Sordal, and Endre Kirkesola
- Recorded, mixed, and mastered at DUB Studios
- Artwork by Niklas Sundin
