= Oscillator (disambiguation) =

An oscillator is a device designed for oscillation.

Oscillator may also refer to:

- Electronic oscillator
  - Voltage-controlled oscillator, used in synthesizers
- Harmonic oscillator
- Oscillator (technical analysis), a method used in technical analysis of financial markets
- Oscillator (cellular automaton)
- Oscillator (EP), an EP by Information Society

== See also ==
- Oscillation (differential equation)
- Oscillation (mathematics)
- Oscillation (album), a studio album by the Norwegian gothic metal band Trail of Tears
- Oscillistor, a semiconductor device
