= Alive and Well... In Krakow =

Video by Green Carnation
- Released: 3 August 2004
- Recorded: January 2004 in Kraków, Poland
- Genre: Progressive rock, progressive metal, gothic rock
- Length: 155:00
- Label: Metal Mind

Green Carnation chronology
Alive and Well... In Krakow (2004)	A Night Under the Dam (2007)

Alive and Well... In Krakow, (a.k.a. Alive and Well... Who am I?) is Green Carnation's first live DVD, released under the Metal Mind Records label in August 2004.

The DVD contains the entire live show, bonus audio selections, interviews, biographies, discography, a photo gallery, bootleg videos and full 5.1 Surround Sound.

== Background ==
This live recording was made in Kraków in January 2004 and was released on 3 August 2004.

The band performed a variety of songs from their albums, including the first 22 minutes of their album Light of Day, Day of Darkness.

== Contents ==
=== Concert ===
Disc 1

1. "Into Deep" – 6:58
2. "Crushed to Dust" – 4:22
3. "Writings on the Wall" – 5:00
4. "Light of Day, Day of Darkness, 1st Part" – 22:51
5. "The Boy In the Attic" – 5:58
6. "Myron & Cole" – 5:40
7. "Rain" – 5:49
8. "As Life Flows By" – 5:35

Non-concert (part of disc 1)

1. Recording of drums "Into Deep" (Bonus Video)
2. "Crushed to Dust" bootleg video (Bonus Video)
3. "Boy in the Attic" bootleg video (Bonus Video)
4. "Writings on the Wall" bootleg video (Bonus Video)

=== Bonus material ===
Disc 2

1. "Into Deep" (acoustic version)
2. "Crushed to Dust" (acoustic version)
3. "The Boy in the Attic" (acoustic version)
4. "Myron & Cole" (acoustic version)
5. "Stay on These Roads" (A-Ha cover)
6. "Wicked Game (cover)" (Chris Isaak cover)
7. "This Is the End" (2004 demo)
- Bonus audio tracks: acoustic versions of four tracks from their last album, two covers plus a very exclusive pre-production demo track from the album The Quiet Offspring.
- Fully animated menu
- Band biography and individual members' biographies, discographies and equipment lists
- 35-minute-long band interview
- Discography
- Studio diary from recording A Blessing in Disguise
- Photo gallery
- Art gallery
- Desktop images
- Weblinks
- DVD in Dolby Digital 5.1 Surround Sound

== Personnel ==
- Terje Vik Schei (a.k.a. Tchort) – guitar, lyrics
- Stein Roger Sordal – bass guitar, vocals, guitar, lyrics
- Kjetil Nordhus – vocals, lyrics
- Oystein Tonnessen – piano, keyboards
- Michael Krumins – guitar
- Anders Kobro – drums
