= Rock and Roll Preacher (disambiguation) =

"Rock and Roll Preacher" is a single by Slade.

Rock and Roll Preacher, Rock 'n' Roll Preacher, Rock'n Roll Preacher may also refer to:

- Rock 'n Roll Preacher, album by Preacher Jack
- "Rock 'N' Roll Preacher", song by Chuck Girard from the album Chuck Girard
- "The Rock 'n' Roll Preacher", song by Subterranean Masquerade from the album Suspended Animation Dreams
- "Rock 'N Roll Preacher", song by Atlantis and its singer Inga Rumpf
