= Bloodstained Endurance =

- Cover art by Travis Smith

Studio album by Trail of Tears
- Released: 27 May 2009
- Recorded: November–December 2008
- Studios: Sound Suite Studio, France
- Genres: Melodic death metal, symphonic gothic metal
- Length: 43:03
- Label: Napalm
- Producers: Terje Refsnes and Trail of Tears

Trail of Tears chronology
Existentia (2007)	Bloodstained Endurance (2009)	Oscillation (2013)

Bloodstained Endurance is the sixth studio album by the Norwegian gothic metal band Trail of Tears. It was the first full-length album recorded after Kjetil Nordhus, Runar Hansen, Kjell Rune Hagen and Jonathan Perez left the band in November 2006, forcing frontman Ronny Thorsen to assemble a new band. It is also the first album to feature soprano Cathrine Paulsen since A New Dimension of Might in 2002. The cover, by Travis Smith, uses the band logo from that album.

== Track listing ==
1. "The Feverish Alliance" – 4:02
2. "Once Kissed by the Serpent (Twice Bitten by Truth)" – 3:22
3. "Bloodstained Endurance" – 3:36
4. "Triumphant Gleam" – 3:41
5. "In the Valley of Ashes" – 3:55
6. "A Storm at Will" – 4:00
7. "Take Aim. Reclaim. Prevail" – 3:12
8. "The Desperation Corridors" – 4:13
9. "Farewell to Sanity" – 4:32
10. "Dead End Gaze" – 3:58
11. "Faith Comes Knocking" – 4:32

Digipak edition bonus track

12. "Onward March the Merciless" – 3:08

== Personnel ==
=== Trail of Tears ===
- Ronny Thorsen – vocals
- Cathrine Paulsen − soprano
- Bjørn Erik Næss − guitar
- Pål Olsen − guitar
- Endre Moe − bass guitar
- Cato Jensen − drums

=== Additional musicians ===
- Audun Grønnestadt - additional orchestration, synths and programming

=== Production ===
- Terje Refsnes - producer, engineer, mixing
- Mika Jussila - mastering at Finnvox Studios, Finland, January 2009
- Travis Smith - cover art
