= Submasq =

Israeli heavy metal band

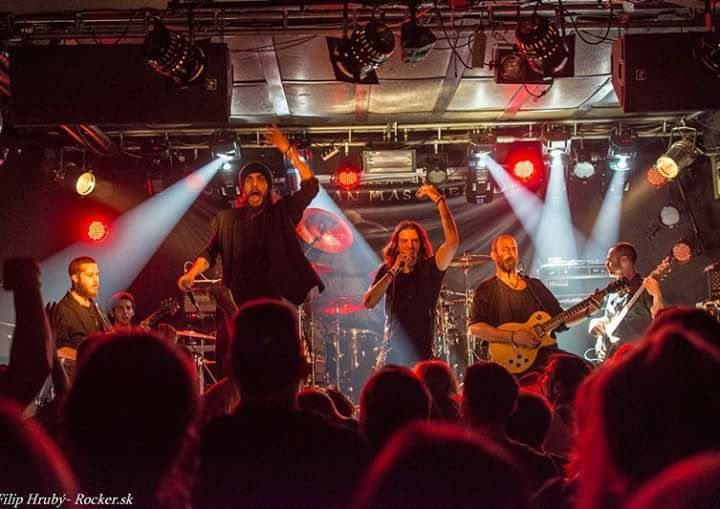

Background information
- Also known as: Subterranean Masquerade (1997–2026)
- Genres: Progressive metal, avant-garde metal, experimental rock, oriental metal
- Years active: 1997–present
- Labels: The End Records, Taklit Music ViciSolum Productions.
- Members: Davidavi (Vidi) Dolev; Tomer Pink; Or Shalev; Omer Fishbein; Shai Yallin; Golan Farhi; Jonathan Amar
- Past members: Paul Kuhr; Kjetil Nordhus; Eliran Weitzman; Matan Or-El Shmuely; Yalon Schori; Jake DePolitte; Tino Losicco; Yishai Swearts; Jason William Walton; Andy Winter

Submasq (stylized as SUBMASQ, formerly Subterranean Masquerade) is a progressive metal band from Israel that was formed in 1997 by Tomer Pink, who is a guitarist and primary songwriter for the band.

== Overview ==
Started as a project consisting of a variety of changing guest and session musicians, Submasq formed into a band consisting of a constant line-up. In 2013, the band reformed while recording their EP - Home, after six years of no activity. Drummer Matan Shmuely (Orphaned Land) and guitarist Or Shalev joined the group with the recording of the 2 songs EP, which was self-marketed in a limited-copy on a vinyl version only. In 2014, while recording their second album, the band announced Kjetil Nordhus (Tristania, Green Carnation) as their new singer and Shai Yallin (Solstice Coil) as their new keyboardist. While mainly described as progressive metal, Submasq incorporates elements of jazz, psychedelic rock, and avant-garde metal, with death metal vocals.

The release of the 2004 EP, Temporary Psychotic State, garnered high acclaim for the band among the underground metal scene. The 2005 album Suspended Animation Dreams received more mixed reviews at the beginning, but in 2014 the album entered the top 50 progressive-metal albums of 2000s by Prog-Sphere magazine.

Home was released in 2013 as a two songs EP after six years of no activity from the band. It consists of the band's original song "Home" and a cover by The Mission - "Beyond The Pale". The reviews were very supportive and created big expectations for the band's forthcoming album.

In January 2015, Submasq released their second album The Great Bazaar with Kjetil Nordhus as the main vocalist and Paul Kuhr as harsh vocalist. The album is characterized with many different music styles, middle-eastern melodies and non-native metal instrument such as clarinet, flute, oud and trumpets.

In February 2015, the band announced that Eliran Weizman, a member of (Asgaut-band), will replace Paul Kuhr as their harsh vocalist.

In 2017, Submasq released their third studio album, Vagabond. The album was widely praised, with Luke Henson of The PROG Mind listing it as his favorite album of the decade in 2020 and describing it as "severely lacking in dull moments, musical errors, and wasted notes."

In February 2018, Submasq embarked on a 25-day European tour supporting fellow-countrymen Orphaned Land and introducing new members Davidavi (Vidi) Dolev on vocals and Yalon Schori on drums. On April 6, 2018, the band announced via their Facebook page that Nordhus and Shmuely have amicably left the band while Dolev and Schori were announced as permanent members.

In March 2019, just prior to embarking on their third European tour, Eliran Weitzman left the band, with Dolev assuming all vocal responsibilities.

In 2020 during the COVID-19 crisis, then band focused on studio work and released The Pros & Cons of Social Isolation, an EPconsisting of 7 reworked tracks from previous albums, as well as a cover of the Phil Collins hit Another Day in Paradise. Later that year, the band announced they signed a record deal with Sensory Records to release their next album. Mountain Fever was released in May 2021.

Submasq were supposed to perform at the first Kineret Open Air festival on October 22, 2021, in Tiberias, featuring 22 Israeli metal artists. The festival was established in 2021 as a way to give local Israelim an "overseas [heavy metal] festival experience," since all the major festivals worldwide, such as the Waken Open Air festival from Germany, and Hellfest from France, were cancelled due to the COVID-19 Pandemic. Due to "issues raised by the authorities in the north," (including a "demand to fence off the festival within the Sea of Galilee itself"), the Kineret Open Air was cancelled and replaced with the Israeli Metal Fest in Tel Aviv, featuring the same artists during the same dates, including but not limited to Submasq, who co-headlined with Walkways and Scardust. During their performance, Noa Gruman from Scardust appeared as a guest vocalist for their song "Somewhere I Sadly Belong".

In 2026, the band changed its name from Subterranean Masquerade to Submasq and released the EP Oedipus. The EP consists of three cover songs, which all share the theme of mothers. The band's fifth album, Spirit Animal, is scheduled to release in September of the same year.

== Discography ==
=== Albums ===
- Suspended Animation Dreams, 2005
- The Great Bazaar, 2015
- Vagabond, 2017
- Mountain Fever, 2021
- Spirit Animal, 2026

=== EPs ===
- Temporary Psychotic State, 2004
- Home, 2013
- The Pros & Cons of Social Isolation, 2020
- Oedipus, 2026

=== Other appearances ===
- Dead Can Dance Tribute: The Lotus Eaters, 2004
- Cuts You Up – The Complete Dark 80's Covers Compilation, 2000
