= In the Woods... =

Norwegian metal band

In The Woods...
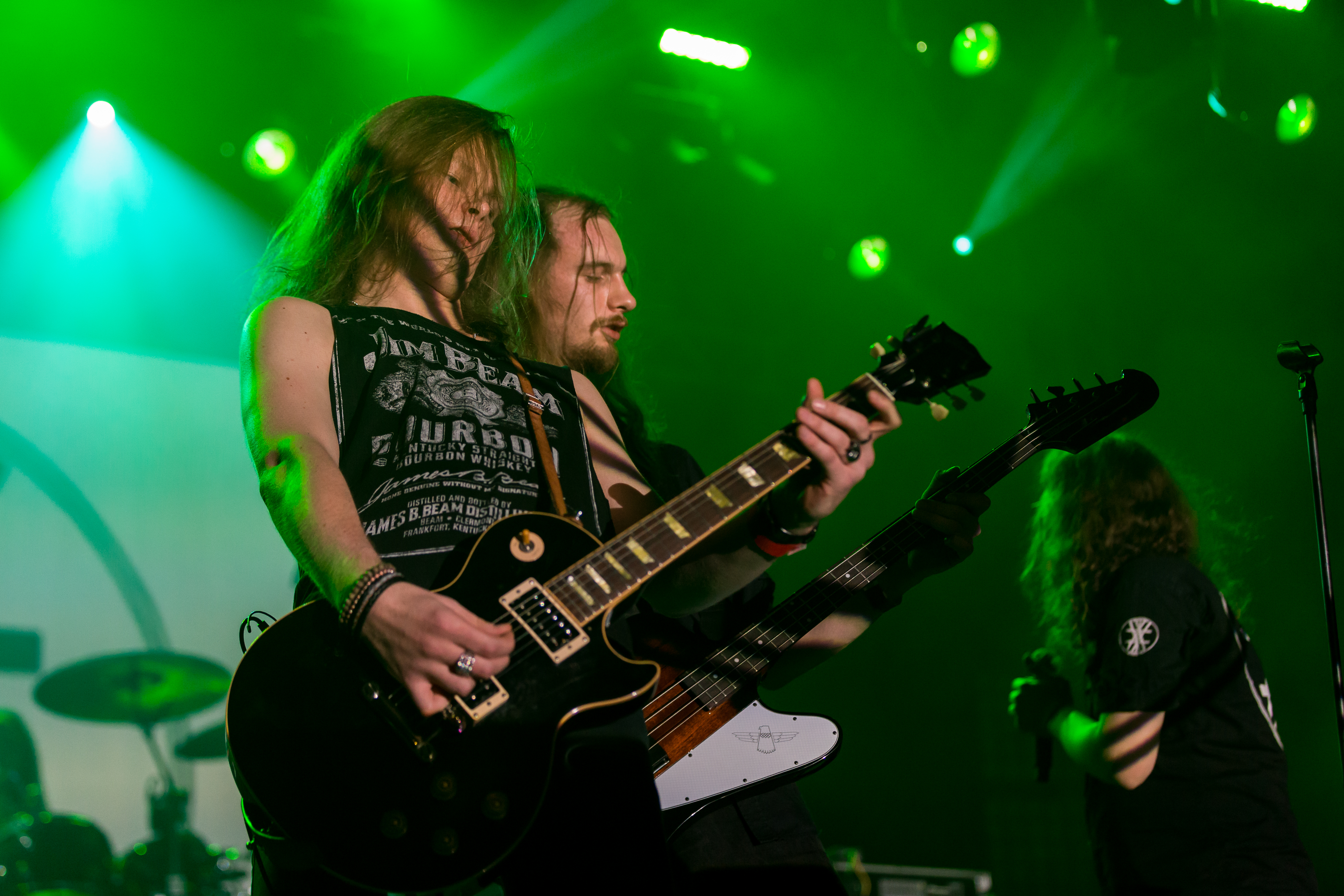
- In the Woods... at Wave-Gotik-Treffen 2017 in Germany

Background information
- Origin: Kristiansand, Norway
- Genres: Avant-garde metal, progressive metal, doom metal, black metal (early)
- Years active: 1992–2000, 2014–present
- Label: Soulseller
- Spinoff of: Green Carnation
- Members: Anders Kobro; Kåre André Sletteberg; Nils Olav Drivdal; Bernt Sørensen; Bernt Fjellestad
- Past members: X. Botteri; C:M. Botteri; Jan Transit; Christer Cederberg; Synne Diana; Bjørn Harstad; Oddvar A:M; Alex Weisbeek; James Fogarty

In the Woods... is a Norwegian avant-garde/progressive metal band from Kristiansand, formed in 1992. The band have released a total of seven studio albums, three singles, one compilation album and one live album throughout its existence. The band disbanded in 2000 and reformed in 2014.

== History ==
The band started out as a death metal band called Green Carnation. With some members leaving, including Terje Vik Schei (a.k.a. Tchort), the remaining members formed In the Woods... The band released a demo in 1993 called The Isle of Men, as well as a full-length album named Heart of the Ages in 1995. The following, Omnio, had lengthy songs with more female vocals. Their third album was Strange in Stereo.

In 2000, In the Woods... released the album Three Times Seven on a Pilgrimage, a compilation of three of their previous 7" featuring covers from Pink Floyd, Jefferson Airplane and King Crimson, together with some newly released and rebuilt songs, like the new version of Child of Universal Tongue.

After releasing Three Times Seven on a Pilgrimage, the band held a farewell performance in their home town of Kristiansand which featured all musicians, including the former members. The performance was recorded and released as Live at the Caledonien Hall in 2003. Some of the members went on to play in the similarly-styled band Green Carnation, others took up personal projects and founded the independent label Karmakosmetix Records, created to support new experimental bands such as In the Woods... was in its time.

The band's founding guitarist Oddvar A.M., born Oddvar Moi, died on May 13, 2013.

Anders Kobro announced the reformation of the band's core lineup (Kobro, X. Botteri and C:M. Botteri) in 2014. 2015 was the year the newest lineup was announced, featuring Kobro, X. Botteri and C:M Botteri, James Fogarty and guitarist Kåre André Sletteberg. Together, they released the album "Pure" in September 2016 under their new label, Debemur Morti Productions. Keyboard player Job Phenex Bos was joining them for shows during 2016 and 2017.

At the end of 2016, the Botteri brothers left the band leading onto Alex Weisbeek and Bernt Sørensen joining In the Woods... for bass and guitar sessions, but due to a long distance between the core of the band and Weisbeek, the band decided to hire in a local bass player by the name of Nils Olav Drivdal. Drivdal joined the band in December 2018 and played his first concert with the band in Kristiansand in March 2019.

In December 2021 James Fogarty left the band, before the new record was finished. The band ended up looking for a new singer/songwriter and hired Bernt Fjellestad later that month.

On September 28, 2022, the band announced their sixth album, Diversum, would be released on November 25.

On January 15, 2025, the band announced their seventh album, Otra, would be released on April 11.

== Band members ==
=== Current ===
- Anders Kobro – drums, percussion (1992–2000, 2014–present)
- Kåre André Sletteberg – guitars (2015–present)
- Bernt Sørensen – guitar (2016–present)
- Nils Olav Drivdal – bass (2018–present)
- Bernt Fjellestad – vocals (2021–present)

=== Former ===
- Christian "X" Botteri – guitars (1992–2000, 2014–2016)
- Christopher "C:M." Botteri – bass (1992–2000, 2014–2016)
- Jan Kenneth Transeth – vocals (1992–2000)
- Oddvar A:M – guitars (1992–2000; died in 2013)
- Bjørn "Berserk" Harstad – guitars (1996–1998)
- Synne "Soprana" Larsen – vocals (1996–2000), session vocals (1994–1996)
- Christer-André Cederberg – guitars (1998–2000)
- James Fogarty – vocals, guitars, keyboards (2015-2021)
- Job Phenex Bos – keyboards (live) (2016–2017)
- Alex Weisbeek – bass (2016–2018)

== Discography ==
Studio albums

- Heart of the Ages (1995)
- Omnio (1997)
- Strange in Stereo (1999)
- Pure (2016)
- Cease the Day (2018)
- Diversum (2022)
- Otra (2025)

Compilation albums

- A Return to the Isle of Men (1996)
- Three Times Seven on a Pilgrimage (2000)

Live albums

- Live at the Caledonien Hall (2003)

Singles

- "White Rabbit" (7") (1996)
- "Let There Be More Light" (7") (1998)
- "Epitaph" (7") (2000)

Demos

- Rehearsal 93 (1993)
- Isle of Men (1993)
- Return to the Isle of Men (1996, re-release of the demo with bonus tracks)

== See also ==
- Green Carnation
- Trail of Tears
- Carpathian Forest
- Ewigkeit
- Chain Collector
