= Diversum =

Studio album by In the Woods...
- Released: November 25, 2022
- Genre: Progressive metal; doom metal; avant-garde metal
- Length: 49:32
- Label: Soulseller Records

In the Woods... chronology
| Cease the Day (2018) | Diversum (2022) | Otra (2025) |

Professional ratings
Review scores
| Source | Rating |
|---|---|
| Ghost Cult Magazine | 7.4/10 |
| Metal Storm | 7.4/10 |

Diversum is the sixth full-length studio album by the Norwegian progressive metal band In the Woods..., released on November 25, 2022.

== Track listing ==
| No. | Title | Length |
|---|---|---|
| 1. | "The Coward's Way" | 6:12 |
| 2. | "Moments" | 4:23 |
| 3. | "We Sinful Converge" | 6:08 |
| 4. | "The Malevolent God" | 7:28 |
| 5. | "A Wonderful Crisis" | 7:35 |
| 6. | "Humanity" | 5:18 |
| 7. | "Master of None" | 5:47 |
| 8. | "Your Dark" | 6:41 |
| Total length: | | 49:32 |
