= Kjetil Nordhus =

Norwegian musician

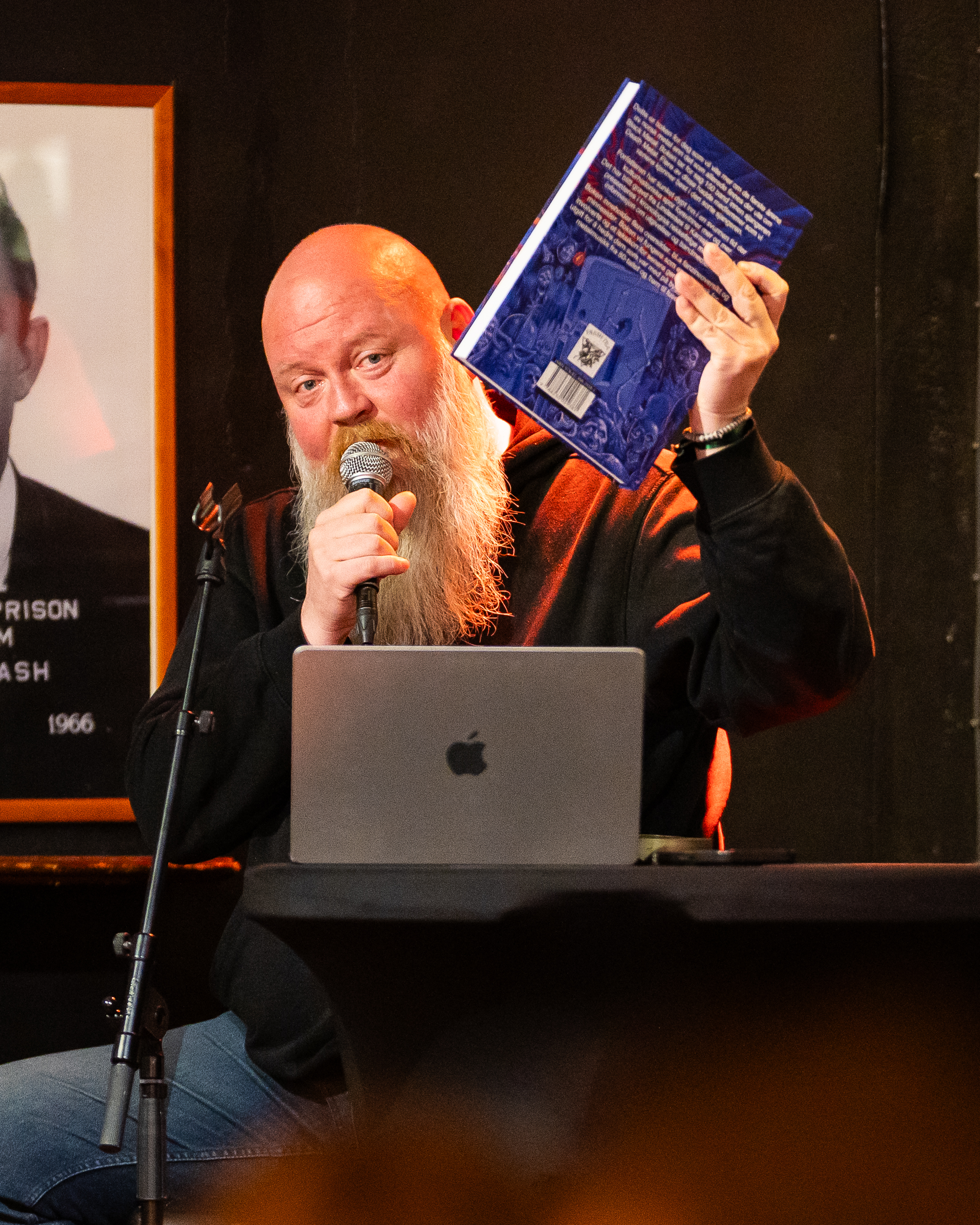
- Nordhus leading a book talk during Southern Discomfort Metal Festival 2025

Background information
- Born: Kjetil Nordhus; 31 May 1975 (age 51)
- Origin: Vennesla Municipality, Vest-Agder, Norway
- Genres: Gothic metal, Doom metal, Heavy metal, Hard rock, Progressive metal
- Occupations: Musician, song writer
- Instruments: Vocals, guitar
- Years active: 1999–present
- Labels: Napalm Records, The End Records, Prophecy Productions, Season of mist, Sublife Productions
- Member of: Green Carnation
- Formerly of: Tristania, Chain Collector, Trail of Tears, Subterranean Masquerade
- Website: tristania.com

Kjetil Nordhus (born 31 May 1975 in Kristiansand, Vest Agder) is a Norwegian singer, composer and music producer who is currently vocalist and song writer in Green Carnation.

== Music ==
Nordhus has been a singer and composer in a number of bands, including the progressive metal band Green Carnation, goth metal bands Trail of Tears and Tristania, melodic death metal band Chain Collector, and progressive metal / middle eastern folk band Subterranean Masquerade.

== Discography ==
| Year | Band | Title | Format |
|---|---|---|---|
| 2000 | Trail of Tears | Profoundemonium | Album |
| 2001 | Green Carnation | Light of Day, Day of Darkness | Album |
| 2002 | Trail of Tears | A New Dimension of Might | Album |
| 2003 | Green Carnation | A Blessing in Disguise | Album |
| 2004 | Green Carnation | The Trilogy | Box Set |
| 2004 | Green Carnation | Alive and Well... In Krakow | Live DVD |
| 2004 | Chain Collector | Forthcoming Addictions | EP |
| 2005 | Green Carnation | The Quiet Offspring | Album |
| 2005 | Green Carnation | The Burden Is Mine... Alone | EP |
| 2005 | Trail of Tears | Free Fall into Fear | Album |
| 2006 | Green Carnation | The Acoustic Verses | Album |
| 2007 | Green Carnation | A Night Under the Dam | Live DVD |
| 2007 | Trail of Tears | Existentia | Album |
| 2007 | Chain Collector | The Masquerade | Album |
| 2010 | Tristania | Rubicon | Album |
| 2013 | Tristania | Darkest White | Album |
| 2015 | Subterranean Masquerade | The Great Bazaar | Album |
| 2017 | Subterranean Masquerade | Vagabond | Album |
| 2018 | Green Carnation | Last Day of Darkness | Live album/DVD |
| 2020 | Green Carnation | Leaves of Yesteryear | Single |
| 2020 | Green Carnation | Leaves of Yesteryear | Album |
| 2020 | Green Carnation | The World Without a View | Single |
| 2021 | Green Carnation | The Greater Cause | Single |
| 2022 | Green Carnation | Time in a Bottle (Jim Croce cover) | Single |
| 2025 | Green Carnation | In Your Paradise | Single |
| 2025 | Green Carnation | The Shores of Melancholia | Single |
| 2025 | Green Carnation | A Dark Poem, Part I: The Shores of Melancholia | Album |
| 2026 | Green Carnation | Sanguis (Blood Ties) | Single |
| 2026 | Green Carnation | I Am Time | Single |
| 2026 | Green Carnation | A Dark Poem, Part II: Sanguis | Album |
| 2026 | Green Carnation | Unconditional Artificial Chemistry | Single |
| 2026 | Green Carnation | The Messiah Complex | Single |
| 2026 | Green Carnation | A Dark Poem, Part III: The Messiah Complex | Album |
