= Profoundemonium =

Studio album by Trail of Tears
- Released: 13 May 2000
- Recorded: January to March 2000
- Studios: Jailhouse Studio, Norway
- Genres: Gothic metal, symphonic metal
- Length: 53:29
- Label: Napalm Records
- Producers: Hans Eidskard and Trail of Tears

Trail of Tears chronology
Disclosure In Red (1998)	Profoundemonium (2000)	A New Dimension of Might (2002)

Professional ratings
Review scores
Source	Rating
Allmusic	2.5/5 stars

Profoundemonium is the second studio album by the band Trail of Tears. The cover art was designed by Travis Smith. It is the last album to feature female soprano Helena Iren Michaelsen, who left the band the year this album was made.

== Track listing ==
1. "Countdown to Ruin" - 2:31
2. "Driven Through the Ruins" - 5:48
3. "Fragile Emotional Disorder" - 6:41
4. "Profoundemonium" - 4:55
5. "Sign of the Shameless" - 4:08
6. "In Frustration's Preludium" - 1:59
7. "In Frustration's Web" - 5:04
8. "Released at Last" - 6:01
9. "Image of Hope" - 3:51
10. "Disappointment's True Face" - 7:30
11. "The Haunted" - 5:01

== Personnel ==
- Ronny Thorsen - vocals
- Helena Iren Michaelsen - vocals
- Runar Hansen - lead guitars
- Terje Heiseldal - guitars
- Kjell Rune Hagen - bass guitar
- Frank Roald Hagen - synthesizers
- Jonathan Pérez - drums

=== Guests ===
- Jan Vigeland - saw, accordion
- Kjetil Nordhus - guest vocals on "Fragile Emotional Disorder"
