= 4C +01.02 =

Blazar in the constellation Cetus

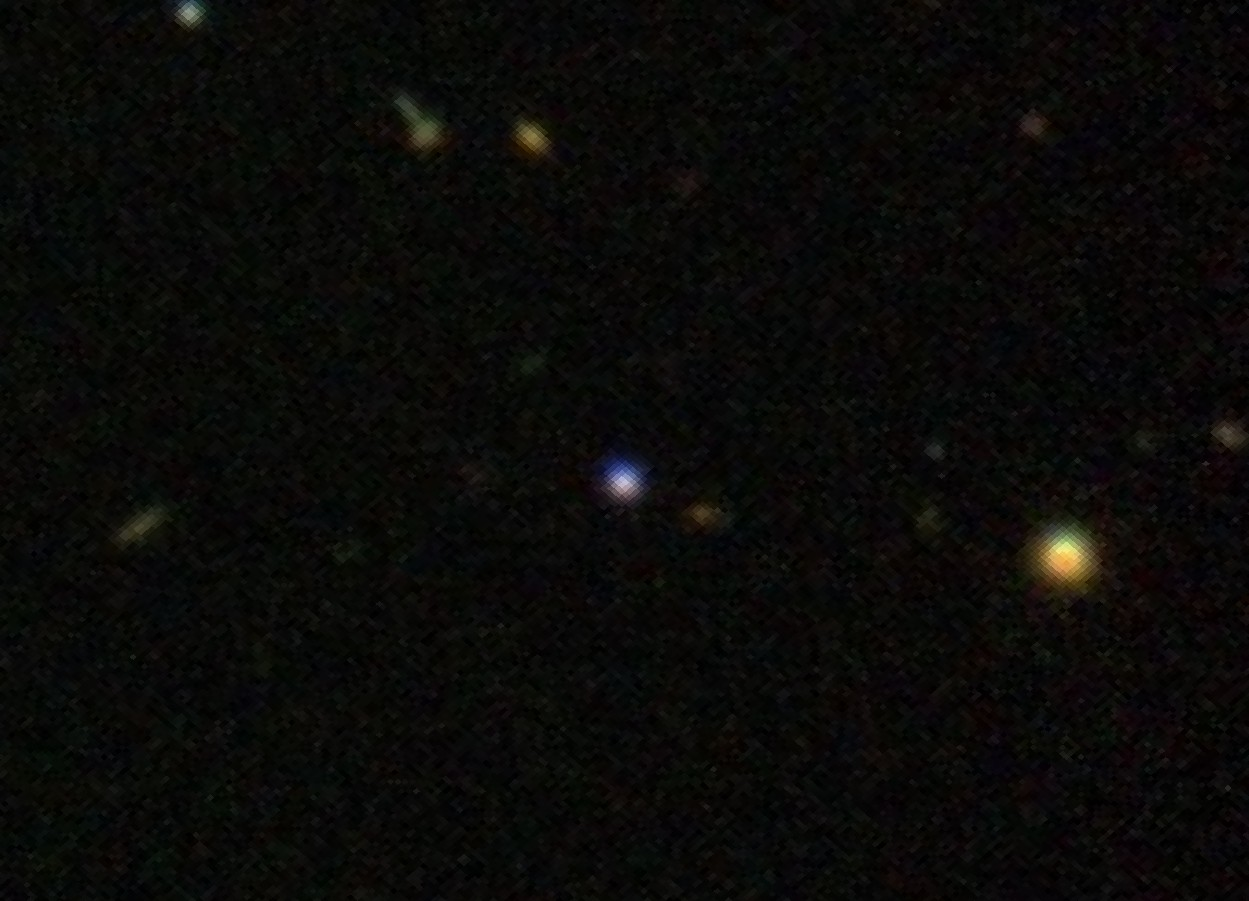
- The blazar 4C +01.02.

Observation data (J2000.0 epoch)
- Constellation: Cetus
- Right ascension: 01^{h} 08^{m} 38.771^{s}
- Declination: +01° 35′ 00.317″
- Redshift: 2.099000
- Heliocentric radial velocity: 629,264 km/s
- Distance: 10.663 Gly (3.269 Mpc)
- Apparent magnitude (V): 18.39
- Apparent magnitude (B): 18.54

Characteristics
- Type: HPQ, FSRQ; blazar
- Notable features: Gamma-ray blazar

Other designations
- PKS 0106+01, PC 0106+0119, LEDA 2818340, PKS B0106+013, OC +012, PB 06280, IRCF J010838.7+013500, WMAP 081, G4Jy 0125, 0106+013

4C +01.02 is a blazar located in the constellation of Cetus. It has a high redshift of (z) 2.099, with its distance estimated to be 10.663 billion light-years. It was first discovered as a faint astronomical radio source by astronomers in 1965 and subsequently identified with its quasi-stellar counterpart. This object hosts a superluminal jet and has a radio spectrum that is classified as flat.

== Description ==
4C +01.02 is found to be violently variable on the electromagnetic spectrum with its bright state exceeding 10^{50} erg s^{−1}. It has displayed several gamma ray outbursts which were detected on 14 September 2013 and on December 20, 2014. When shown on a 7-day gamma-ray light curve, 4C +01.02 showed long periods of flaring activity between September 23, 2014 and August 24, 2017 while the 2-day light curve revealed there are 14 flaring components showing the greatest possible integral flux of (2.5 ± 0.2) × 10^{−6} ph cm^{−2} s^{−1}. A short variability was also identified, which was 0.66 ± 0.08 days. Additional gamma-ray activity was observed by the Large Area Telescope in March and September 2022. Simultaneously, 4C +01.02 also reached a high optical state in the same month.

4C +01.02 is classified as a core-dominated quasar. It has a radio core measuring 2 milliarcseconds. There is a much weaker feature located southwest from the core. A strong jet can be seen pointing in a southerly direction displaying a magnetic field which is parallel with the jet's direction via a 8.5 GHz radio image. When observed by Hubble and the Chandra X-ray Observatory, the jet displays X-ray emission that follows its trajectory in an S-shaped path and subsequently becoming brighter. Superluminal motion was also detected in the jet components.

The central supermassive black hole mass of 4C +01.02 is estimated to be 3 billion M_{☉} based on the constraint of its accretion disk component. Additionally in 2024, its gamma emission was found displaying quasi-periodic oscillation with a period of either 253 or 286 days.
