= The Quiet Offspring =

Studio album by Green Carnation
- Released: 22 February 2005
- Recorded: August–September 2004
- Genre: Hard rock, progressive metal
- Length: 56:19
- Label: The End; Season of Mist
- Producer: Terje Refsnes

Green Carnation chronology
A Blessing in Disguise (2003)	The Quiet Offspring (2005)	The Burden Is Mine... Alone (2005)

Professional ratings
Review scores
Source	Rating
AllMusic	3.5/5 stars
Kerrang!	3/5 stars
Metal Storm	(Avg:7.9/10)
Metal Review	(unfavorable)
PyroMusic	(6.9/10)
Vampire Magazine	(favorable)

The Quiet Offspring is the fourth full-length studio album by the Norwegian progressive metal band Green Carnation. It was released on 22 February 2005.

== Background ==
In this recording, the band breaks away from their previous offerings. Although critically acclaimed and well accepted by fans, The Quiet Offspring has a more traditional rock sound and leaves behind much of the progressiveness and atmospheric feels of the band's previous albums, Light of Day, Day of Darkness and A Blessing in Disguise. Some listeners have criticized this transition, while others claim it would have been inconceivable to repeat the feat of the sixty-minute album.

== Track listing ==
1. "The Quiet Offspring" – 4:05 (Sordal)
2. "Between the Gentle Small and the Standing Tall" – 4:15 (Tchort, Sordal)
3. "Just When You Think It's Safe" – 5:18 (Tchort)
4. "A Place for Me" – 5:26 (Krumins)
5. "The Everlasting Moment" – 5:09 (Sordal)
6. "Purple Door, Pitch Black" – 4:12 (Sordal)
7. "Childsplay - Part I" – 4:47 (Tchort)
8. "Dead But Dreaming" – 5:26 (Tchort)
9. "Pile of Doubt" – 5:56 (Sordal)
10. "When I Was You" – 7:22 (Nordhus)
11. "Childsplay - Part II" – 4:23 (Tchort, Moen)

== Personnel ==
Green Carnation

- Kjetil Nordhus – vocals
- Terje Vik Schei (a.k.a. Tchort) – guitars
- Michael Krumins – guitars
- Stein Roger Sordal – bass guitar, guitars
- Kenneth Silden – keyboards
- Anders Kobro – drums

Guest musicians

- Bernt Moen – keyboards, piano on "Childsplay Part I" and "Childsplay Part II"
