= Cease the Day =

Studio album by In the Woods...
- Released: November 23, 2018
- Recorded: September 2017 – May 2018
- Genres: Progressive metal, doom metal, gothic metal
- Length: 53:32
- Label: Debemur Morti Productions

In the Woods... chronology
Pure (2016)	Cease the Day (2018)	Diversum (2022)

Professional ratings
Review scores
Source	Rating
Metal Gods TV	8/10
Metal Injection	8.5/10

Cease the Day is the fifth full-length studio album by the Norwegian progressive metal band In the Woods... It is their first album without the Botteri brothers, guitarist Christian "X" and bassist Christopher "C:M.".

== Track listing ==
No.	Title	Length
1.	"Empty Streets"	9:21
2.	"Substance Vortex"	7:16
3.	"Respect My Solitude"	6:25
4.	"Cloud Seeder"	6:43
5.	"Still Yearning"	8:48
6.	"Strike Up with the Dawn"	6:18
7.	"Transcending Yesterdays"	6:55
8.	"Cease the Day"	1:46
Total length:		53:32
