= Omnio =

Studio album by In the Woods...
- Released: October 14, 1997
- Recorded: September 1996 – March 1997
- Genre: Avant-garde metal; progressive metal
- Length: 63:08
- Label: Misanthropy Records

In the Woods... chronology
Heart of the Ages (1995)	Omnio (1997)	Strange in Stereo (1999)

Omnio is the second full-length album by Norwegian avant-garde metal band In the Woods... It was released on October 14, 1997, through Misanthropy Records.

== Reception ==
Professional ratings
Review scores
Source	Rating
AllMusic	4.5/5 stars

In his review for AllMusic, Thom Jurek calls Omnio a "devastatingly beautiful marriage of prog metal, gothic texture, epic scope, and amazingly intricate, deeply moving songwriting for a tour de force that stands as one of European metal's classic recordings." He claims the album has "remained deeply influential since its initial release in 1997."

== Track listing ==
No.	Title	Length
1.	"299.796 km/s"	14:46
2.	"I Am Your Flesh"	7:07
3.	"Kairos!"	3:34
4.	"Weeping Willow"	11:39
5.	"Omnio": I. "Omnio? – Pre" (11:59); II. "Omnio? – Bardo" (5:54); III. "Omnio? – Post" (8:09)"	26:02
Total length:		63:08

== Notes ==
The titles of the three tracks "Omnio? – Pre", "Omnio? – Bardo", and "Omnio? – Post" are related. Pre is a prefix used to say "before", Bardo is a Tibetan word for "intermediate state", and Post is a prefix meaning "after".

At around 6:00 of "Omnio? – Pre", female voices can be heard singing in French. The lyrics of this portion of the song are not listed in the album; however, the words "j'espère que tous les autres" (meaning "I hope that everyone else") can be heard multiple times. The following three syllables are hard to understand.

In the booklet lyrics of "Weeping Willow", all the text is in lower case except for a bunch of letters. The content (if any) of this cryptographic message is still unknown.

== Credits ==
- X. Botteri
- Oddvar A:M
- Bjørn Harstad
- Jan Ovl
- C:M. Botteri
- Synne Diana Soprana
- Anders Kobro
