= Strange in Stereo =

Studio album by In the Woods...
- Released: April 20, 1999
- Genre: Progressive metal; avant-garde metal
- Length: 63:15
- Label: Misanthropy Records; Amazonian Records
- Producer: Trond Breen

In the Woods... chronology
Omnio (1997)	Strange in Stereo (1999)	Pure (2016)

Professional ratings
Review scores
Source	Rating
AllMusic	4/5 stars

Strange in Stereo is the third full-length studio album by the Norwegian heavy metal band In the Woods...

== Track listing ==
No.	Title	Length
1.	"Closing In"	5:42
2.	"Cell"	4:33
3.	"Vanish in the Absence of Virtue"	4:16
4.	"Basement Corridors"	5:18
5.	"Ion"	5:40
6.	"Generally More Worried than Married"	8:53
7.	"Path of the Righteous"	6:55
8.	"Dead Man's Creek"	7:44
9.	"Titan Transcendence"	5:41
10.	"Shelter"	0:37
11.	"By the Banks of Pandemonium"	7:56
Total length:		63:15
