= Helena Iren Michaelsen =

Norwegian singer

Helena Michaelsen
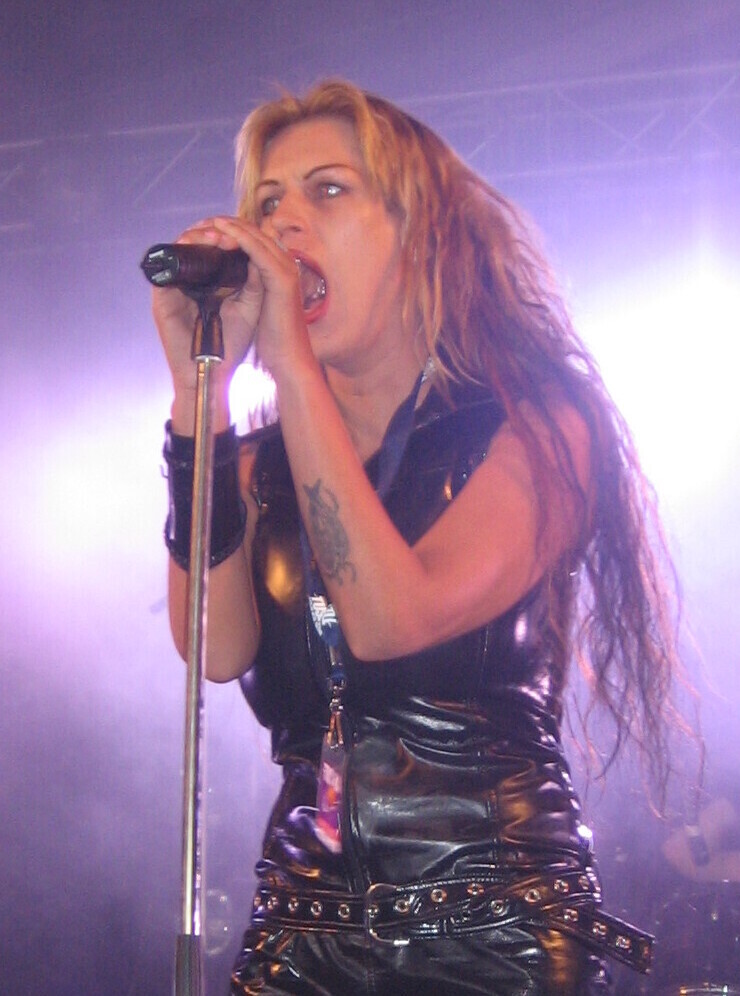
- Michaelsen performing in 2007

Background information
- Born: Margrethe Jacobsen; 2 June 1977 (age 49); Evje, Norway
- Genres: Symphonic metal, gothic metal, symphonic black metal
- Occupations: Singer, songwriter
- Years active: 1997–present

Helena Iren Michaelsen (born 2 June 1977) is a Norwegian singer. She is the frontwoman of the symphonic metal band Imperia and her solo project Angel. She was the lead singer of the gothic metal band Trail of Tears from 1997 to 2000, and was briefly the singer of Dutch symphonic metal band Sahara Dust (later renamed to Epica).

== Career ==
=== Trail of Tears (1997–2000) ===
Michaelsen was born in Evje, and started off as the female vocalist in 1997 for Norwegian gothic metal band Trail of Tears, succeeding after Ales Vik who departed from the band that same year. Up until that year, the band had been called Natt. A year later, Michaelsen and the band recorded their debut album Disclosure in Red in which she sang contralto vocals and contributed to writing lyrics. In 2000, she again took role of contralto vocals in their second album Profoundemonium, which was their last album to feature Helena.

Soon after, she was replaced by Cathrine Paulsen in May of that year.

=== Sahara Dust (2002–2003) ===
Two years after leaving Trail of Tears, she was selected by Mark Jansen (who had just left After Forever) as vocalist for his new band Sahara Dust; but she left not long after, replaced by then-unknown Simone Simons. The band was renamed Epica, inspired by the album of the same name by Tampa, Florida-based Kamelot that was released the same year.

Michaelsen was not present during the Sahara Dust reunion in 2022. She has also stated that she doesn't think much about her time with the band as it was brief.

=== Imperia and Angel (2004–present) ===
After leaving Sahara Dust, Michaelsen teamed up with Steve Wolz (who was to be the drummer for Sahara Dust) and the pair relocated to Norway. Upon their return to The Netherlands they formed the band Imperia.

As Imperia, Michaelsen and Wolz recorded a cover of "The Lotus Eaters" by Dead Can Dance for a double tribute album with the same title released through the Greek label Black Lotus Records. The track subsequently was included in Imperia's 2004 album The Ancient Dance of Qetesh as a bonus track.

As of 2022, Michaelsen has released six studio albums with Imperia and three with Angel.

== Personal life ==
Michaelsen's birth name was Margrethe Jacobsen, but she had changed it at the age of 18. She's married to her Angel bandmate Oliver Phillips.

She has two children, a son named Joackim born in 1995, and a daughter named Angel born in 2006. In a 2021 interview, she claimed that Angel had been "kidnapped" in 2014 and was "a victim of child prostitution, she’s been neglected and abused, she’s in a terrible shape. Since I’m out of the country, this past August 2020, I’ve hired a private investigator to spy on her and this person told me that she’s quite skinny and apparently on drugs." She claimed that she had not been in contact with Angel since 2018, and that some of her songs, including "Happy Birthday Angel", were about her daughter.

== Discography ==
=== Imperia ===
Studio albums:

- The Ancient Dance of Qetesh (2004)
- The Queen of Light (2007)
- Secret Passion (2011)
- Tears of Silence (2015)
- Flames of Eternity (2019)
- The Last Horizon (2021)
- Dark Paradise (2024)

=== Angel ===
Studio albums:

- A Woman's Diary – Chapter I (2005)
- A Woman's Diary – Chapter II (2020)
- A Woman's Diary – The Hidden Chapter (2020)

=== Trail of Tears ===
Studio albums:

- Disclosure in Red (1998)
- Profoundemonium (2000)
