= Disclosure in Red =

Studio album by Trail of Tears
- Released: October 1998
- Recorded: September 1998
- Studios: Jailhouse Studio, Norway
- Genres: Gothic metal, symphonic metal
- Length: 47:18
- Label: DSFA Records
- Producer: Hans Eidskard

Trail of Tears chronology
Disclosure in Red (1998)	Profoundemonium (2000)

Disclosure in Red is the first studio album by the Norwegian gothic metal band, Trail of Tears.

It was rated an eight out of ten by Chronicles of Chaos.

== Track listing ==
All music by Trail of Tears except "Illusion?" by Frank Ørland. All lyrics by R. Thorsen and H. Michaelsen

1. "When Silence Cries..." – 5:10
2. "The Daughters of Innocence" – 3:54
3. "The Day We Drowned" – 4:40
4. "Mournful Pigeon" – 5:00
5. "Swallowed Tears" – 4:40
6. "Illusion?" – 3:26
7. "Enigma of the Absolute" – 4:04
8. "Words of the Fly" – 3:00
9. "Temptress" – 5:19
10. "The Burden – 8:05

Japanese bonus tracks

11. "Once a Paradise" – 4:34
12. "Orroro" – 1:56

== Personnel ==
- Ronny Thorsen - vocals
- Helena Iren Michaelsen - vocals
- Runar Hansen - lead guitars
- Terje Heiseldal - guitars
- Kjell Rune Hagen - bass guitar
- Frank Roald Hagen - synths
- Jonathan Pérez - drums
