= The Burden Is Mine... Alone =

EP by Green Carnation
- Released: October 2005
- Recorded: 2005
- Length: 16:12
- Label: Profound Lore
- Producer: Green Carnation

Green Carnation chronology
The Quiet Offspring (2005)	The Burden Is Mine... Alone (2005)	Acoustic Verses (2006)

The Burden Is Mine... Alone is an EP by the Norwegian progressive metal band Green Carnation, released in October 2005 by Profound Lore Records.

== Background ==
The EP would be an indicator of the stylistic shift the band planned for their next album, The Acoustic Verses. The EP and following album are very different from the usual dark mood that the band's older releases have.

This all out acoustic release has a lighter tone, and is a larger stylistic shift for the band. The EP also contains two tracks that were not included in the 2006 album, The Acoustic Verses.

== Track listing ==
1. "The Burden Is Mine... Alone" (Sordal) − 3:14
2. "Sweet Leaf" − 5:04 (Schei)
3. "Transparent Me" − (Jacksonville) – 4:44
4. "Six Ribbons" (Jon English cover) − 3:10

== Personnel ==
- Stein Roger Sordal − Bass guitar, EBow, lead vocals, backing vocals
- Terje Vik Schei a.k.a. Tchort − Acoustic guitar
- Kjetil Nordhus − lead vocals, backing vocals
- Tommy Jacksonville − drums, percussion
- Michael Krumins − acoustic guitar, semi-acoustic guitar, theremin
- Kenneth Silden − piano, rhodes, strings, mellotron
