= A Night Under the Dam =

Video by Green Carnation
- Released: 1 February 2007
- Recorded: 3 August 2006
- Genre: Progressive rock, acoustic, gothic rock
- Length: 61:12
- Label: Sublife

Green Carnation chronology
| Alive and Well... In Krakow (2004) | A Night Under the Dam (2007) | Last Day of Darkness (2018) |

A Night Under the Dam is Green Carnation's second live DVD, released under the Sublife Productions label on 1 February 2007.

The DVD contains the entire live show, including two bonus songs, a photo gallery containing more than one-hundred-seventy images, a behind-the-scenes video and full 5.1 Surround Sound.

== Background ==
This live recording was made several kilometers into the Norwegian southern mountains, under the thirty-meter-tall dam Nåvatn-3 built in 1939 -hence the album name-, by the lake Nåvatn in Åseral Municipality.

The band performed its entire The Acoustic Verses album and other material in front of an audience of more than five hundred. Green Carnation was supported by several guests, including the Kristiansand String Quartet, singer Anne Marie Almedal, and violinist Leif A. Wiese.

== Contents ==
Concert

1. "Child's Play (Part III)" – 4:32
2. "Sweet Leaf" – 4:59
3. "9-29-045 (Part I, II and III)" – 15:50
4. "Alone" – 3:56
5. "Maybe?" – 3:29
6. "High Tide Waves" – 8:21
7. "Transparent Me" – 5:16
8. "Six Ribbons" – 3:52
9. "The Burden Is Mine... Alone" – 7:57
- Behind-the-scenes documentary video
- Extensive photo gallery

== Personnel ==
=== Band members ===
- Terje Vik Schei (a.k.a. Tchort) – guitar, lyrics
- Stein Roger Sordal – bass guitar, vocals, guitar, lyrics
- Kjetil Nordhus – vocals, lyrics
- Kenneth Silden – piano, keyboards
- Michael Krumins – guitar, theremin
- Tommy Jacksonville – drums

=== Guest musicians ===
- Bjørn Harstad – guitar
- Anne Marie Almedal – vocals
- Leif A. Wiese – violin
- Kristiansand string quartet
