= QSO B1823+568 =

BL Lacertae object located in the constellation Draco

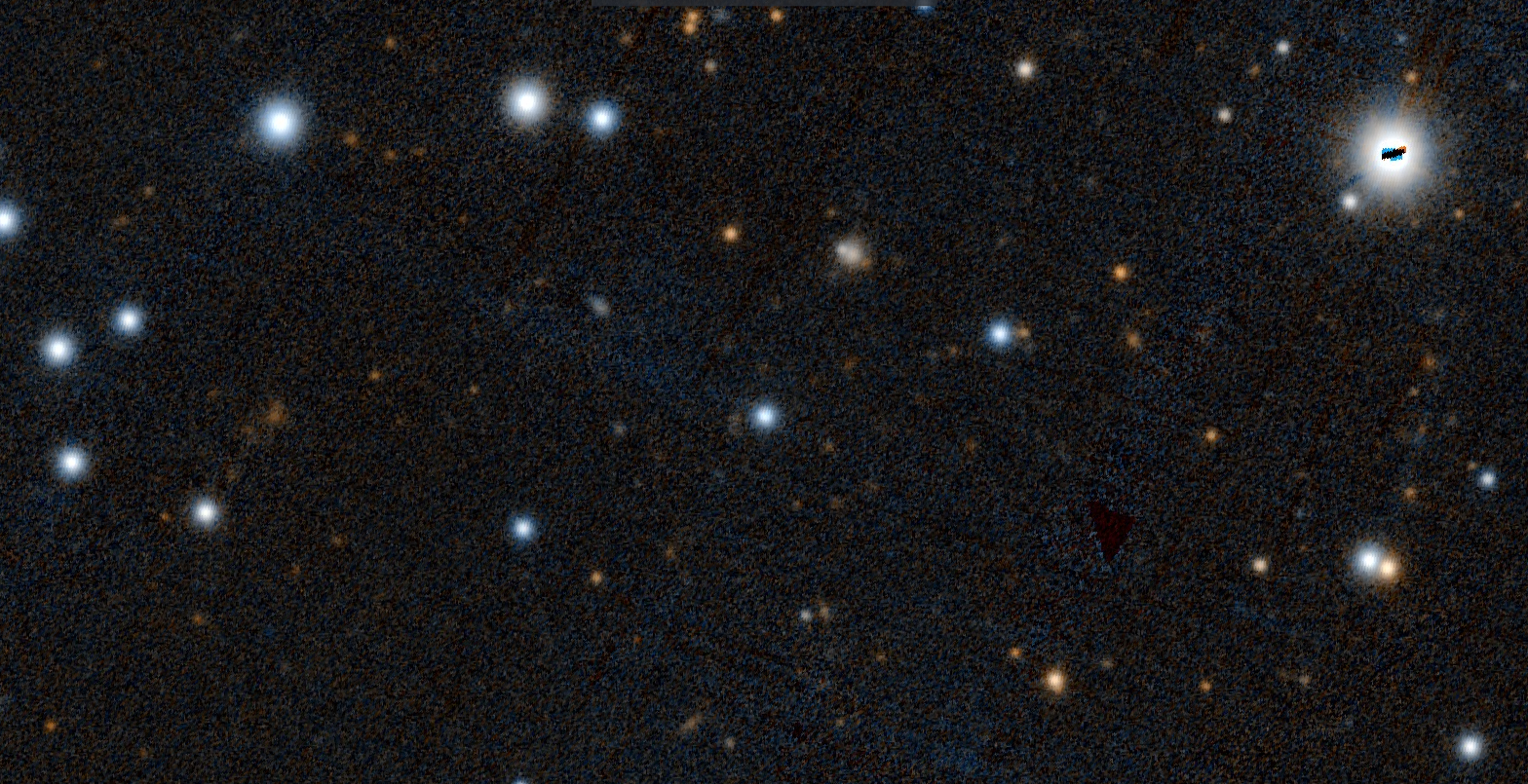
- The BL Lacertae object QSO B1823+568 taken with Pan-STARRS (center).

Observation data (J2000.0 epoch)
- Constellation: Draco
- Right ascension: 18^{h} 24^{m} 07.068^{s}
- Declination: +56° 51′ 01.49″
- Redshift: 0.664000
- Heliocentric radial velocity: 199,062 km/s
- Distance: 5.917 Gly
- Apparent magnitude (V): 19.3
- Apparent magnitude (B): 18.9

Characteristics
- Type: FSRQ BLLAC

Other designations
- 4C +56.27, NVSS J182407+565101, LEDA 2821401, 87GB 182315.0+564925, OU +539, IERS B1823+568, IRCF J182407.0+565101, WMAP 053, 4FGL J1824.1+5651, 1823+568, 2CXO J182407.0+565101, RX J1824.1+5650

QSO B1823+568 is a BL Lacertae object located in the northern constellation of Draco. Its redshift is (z) 0.664 and it was first discovered as an astronomical radio source by A.N. Argue and Chris Sullivan in 1980. The radio spectrum of the source appears as flat making it a flat-spectrum radio quasar but also has been classified as a blazar in literature where it is alternatively designated as 4C 56.27. It is also a radio-loud quasar.

== Description ==
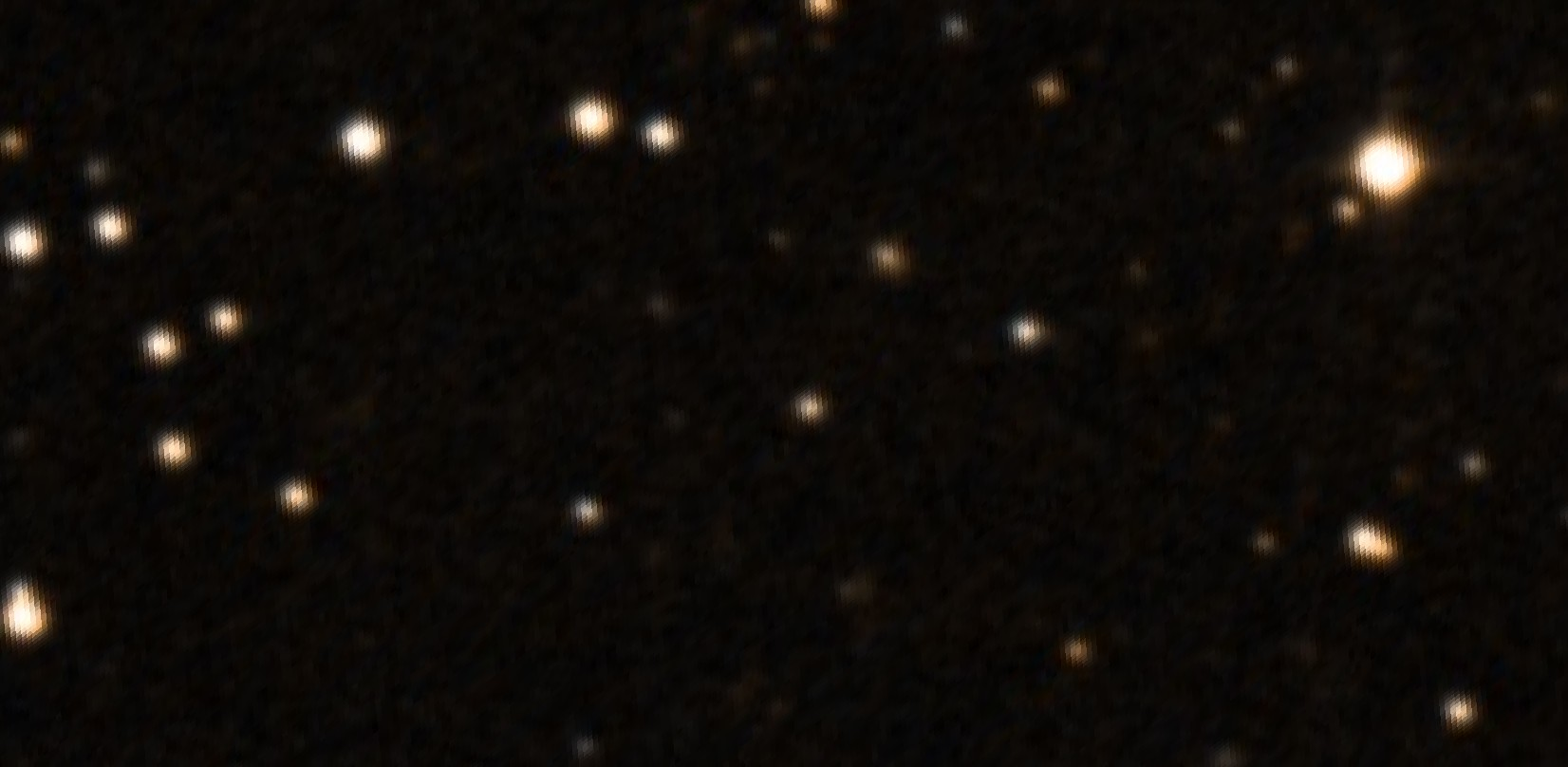
Digitized Sky Survey image of QSO B1823+568.

=== Host galaxy ===
The host of QSO B1823+568 is found to be an elongated elliptical galaxy based on imaging made by Hubble Space Telescope. Its V-band apparent magnitude is 16.4. The host displays non-relaxed isotopes suggesting a past merger. It is extremely bright at near-infrared wavelengths. A highly distorted possible companion galaxy was found located east from QSO B1823+568.

=== Variability ===
QSO B1823+568 is variable on the electromagnetic spectrum. It is known to display rapid brightening within a few days based on a light curve, which was obtained during the Hamburg quasar monitoring program, conducted at Calar Alto Observatory in August 1991. Its polarization is known to differ between 9 and 17%, with its flux increasing from 1.4 to 2.0 Jansky. Enhanced gamma ray activity was observed from the source on November 16, 2024.

=== Radio structure ===
The source of QSO B1823+568 is classified as compact. Observations made by MERLIN described it as having a triple structure, made up of a bright radio core connected by a radio emission bridge. There are two components located 1.1 and 1.4 milliarcseconds away, straddling the core. 84 GHz radio imaging showed a bare core instead with an estimated flux density of 485 mJy. High polarization was also detected in the core based on polarization images made by Very Long Baseline Interferometry.

QSO B1823+568 has an extended jet towards the south-east direction. When revealed through 43 GHz imaging, the jet displays a rich structure on a scale of 14 parsecs and has four identified jet components, detected through a 15 GHz radio image. These components contain jet knots. Two of the knots are moving at superluminal speeds while the other two are stationary. The jet at 43 GHz, instead shows fast-moving knots with implications of a resolved underlying flow. Faraday rotation was detected in the jet with a rotation measure of −200 ± 88 rad m^{−2}. Very Large Array imaging have showed the jet to bend northeast, forming a lobe at the position angle of 95° and appearing to have a longitudinal magnetic field.

=== Quasi-periodic oscillation ===
In 2022, QSO B1823+568 was shown to undergo a quasi-periodic oscillation with a variability period of 283^{+17}_{-13} days, equivalent to more than 10 days but less than a year. Based on observations, this is likely explained by a nonballistic helical jet motion driven by orbital motion in a binary supermassive black hole system lying in the center of the quasar. The mass of the primary supermassive black hole is estimated to be between 1.92 billion M_{☉} and 3.43 billion M_{☉}.
