= Journey to the End of the Night (Green Carnation album) =

Album

Studio album by Green Carnation
- Released: 28 May 2000
- Recorded: July 1999, Studio E
- Genre: Gothic metal; progressive metal
- Length: 70:16
- Label: The End
- Producer: Green Carnation

Green Carnation chronology
Hallucinations of Despair (1991)	Journey to the End of the Night (2000)	Light of Day, Day of Darkness (2001)

Professional ratings
Review scores
Source	Rating
Allmusic	link

Journey to the End of the Night is the debut studio album by the Norwegian progressive metal band Green Carnation, released by The End Records on 28 May 2000.

== Background ==
Journey to the End of the Night is the last composition by Green Carnation featuring founding member Christian "X" Botteri on lead guitar and effects.

"My Dark Reflections of Life and Death", the third track from the album, was re-recorded for the band's 2020 album, Leaves of Yesteryear.

The title is a reference to Louis-Ferdinand Celine's novel Journey to the End of the Night.

== Track listing ==
No.	Title	Length
1.	"Falling into Darkness"	2:33
2.	"In the Realm of the Midnight Sun"	13:42
3.	"My Dark Reflections of Life and Death"	17:50
4.	"Under Eternal Stars"	15:31
5.	"Journey to the End of the Night (Part 1)"	11:28
6.	"Echoes of Despair (Part 2)"	2:30
7.	"End of Journey (Part 3)"	5:08
8.	"Shattered (Part 4)"	1:34
Total length:		70:16

== Personnel ==
Green Carnation

- Christian "X" Botteri − guitar effects
- Terje Vik Schei − all rhythm guitars
- Alf T Leangel − drums
- Christopher Botteri − bass

Guest musicians

- Rx Draumtanzer − vocals (on tracks 3, 4, 5 and 7)
- Linn Solaas − vocals (on tracks 4 and 5)
- Synne Soprana (In The Woods...) − vocals (on tracks 1 and 8)
- Vibeke Stene (ex-Tristania) − vocals (on tracks 2, 3 and 4)
- Atle Dorum − vocals (on track 2)
- Leif Christian Wiese − violin (on tracks 4, 5 and 7)
