= Pure (In the Woods... album) =

Studio album by In the Woods...
- Released: September 16, 2016
- Genre: Progressive metal, doom metal, gothic metal
- Length: 67:17
- Label: Debemur Morti Productions

In the Woods... chronology
Strange in Stereo (1999)	Pure (2016)	Cease the Day (2018)

Professional ratings
Review scores
Source	Rating
Metal Injection	8.5/10

Pure is the fourth studio album by the Norwegian progressive metal band In the Woods... It is their first album since their 1999 album Strange in Stereo, and their first album without founding guitarist Oddvar A.M. who died on May 13, 2013, one year before the band reformed.

== Track listing ==
No.	Title	Length
1.	"Pure"	7:21
2.	"Blue Oceans Rise (Like a War)"	5:41
3.	"Devil's at the Door"	5:47
4.	"The Recalcitrant Protagonist"	5:43
5.	"The Cave of Dreams"	4:55
6.	"Cult of Shining Stars"	5:55
7.	"Towards the Black Surreal"	6:55
8.	"Transmission KRS"	10:46
9.	"This Dark Dream"	7:18
10.	"Mystery of the Constellations"	6:56
Total length:		67:17
