= Heart of the Ages =

Studio album by In the Woods...
- Released: March 1995
- Recorded: November 1994 – January 1995 at Star Studio, Norway
- Genres: Atmospheric black metal, progressive metal
- Length: 59:10
- Label: Misanthropy Records
- Producer: Trond Breen

In the Woods... chronology
Heart of the Ages (1995)	Omnio (1996)

Heart of the Ages (stylized on the cover as HEart of the Ages) is the debut studio album by Norwegian black metal band In the Woods... The album was recorded at Star Studios in Norway with production of Trond Breen.

== Critical reception ==
Professional ratings
Review scores
Source	Rating
AllMusic	4/5 stars

AllMusic called Heart of the Ages "an album that even now, eight years after its original release, stands apart from virtually everything else on the black metal scene." In 2013, Decibel ranked it at number 55 on its list of the Top 100 Black Metal Albums of All Time.

== Track listing ==
All tracks are written by In the Woods... (X. Botteri, Oddvar a:m, Ovl. Svithjod, C.M. Botteri, Kobro).

No.	Title	Length
1.	"Yearning the Seeds of a New Dimension"	12:23
2.	"Heart of the Ages"	8:22
3.	"...In the Woods": 1. "Prologue"; 2. "Moments of..." 3. "Epilogue"	7:50
4.	"Mourning the Death of Aase"	3:33
5.	"Wotan's Return"	14:52
6.	"Pigeon"	3:00
7.	"The Divinity of Wisdom"	9:07

== Personnel ==
In the Woods...

- X. Botteri – bass guitar
- Oddvar a:m – guitar
- Ovl. Svithjod – vocals
- C.M. Botteri – guitar
- Kobro – drums
