= Chain Collector =

Norwegian heavy metal band

- Origin: Kristiansand, Norway
- Genres: Melodic death metal Progressive metal
- Years active: 2003–present
- Labels: Sound Riot Records; Massacre Records
- Members: Kjetil Nordhus; Svenn Aksel Henriksen; Anders Kobro; Gøran Bomann; Kjell Jacobsen
- Website: www.chaincollector.com

Chain Collector is a heavy metal band from Norway that formed in 2003. Some of the members originated from bands such as Green Carnation, Carpathian Forest, Trail of Tears, Dismal Euphony and In the Woods. In 2004, the four-song Forthcoming Addiction demo was recorded at DUB studio. The band signed a two-album deal with Sound Riot Records in September 2004, but due to the touring of some members with their other bands at the beginning of the year, the production of The Masquerade was not finished until March 2005. In July 2005, German label Massacre Records became interested in the band, and Sound Riot Records licensed the Chain Collector album to them. Massacre Records released The Masquerade in Europe, Canada, and Australia in November 2005, while Sound Riot Records released their edition in December 2005. The band left Sound Riot and released the second album, Unrestrained in 2007.

== Band members ==
=== Current ===
- Gøran Bomann – guitar
- Svenn Aksel Henriksen – vocals
- Anders Kobro – drums
- Martin Eltvik – bass

=== Former ===
- Kjetil Nordhus – vocals
- Kjell Jacobsen – guitar
- Runar Hansen – guitar

=== Session ===
- Hanne Kolstø – vocals
- Endre Kirkesola – bass, keyboards

== Discography ==
Studio albums

- The Masquerade (2005)
- Unrestrained (2008)
