= Existentia =

Studio album by Trail of Tears
- Released: January 29, 2007
- Recorded: 2006
- Genre: Gothic metal, progressive metal
- Length: 45:05
- Label: Napalm Records
- Producer: Terje Refsnes

Trail of Tears chronology
Free Fall Into Fear (2005)	Existentia (2007)	Bloodstained Endurance (2009)

Professional ratings
Review scores
Source	Rating
Allmusic	3/5 stars

Existentia is the fifth album by Norwegian gothic metal band Trail of Tears. It was released on January 26 (Europe) and January 30 (USA), 2007.

It is the last full-length album recorded with Kjetil Nordhus, Runar Hansen, Kjell Rune Hagen and Jonathan Perez, all of whom left the band in November 2006.

== Track listing ==
1. "Deceptive Mirrors" – 4:28
2. "My Comfort" – 4:37
3. "Venom Inside My Veins" – 4:42
4. "Decadence Becomes Me" – 4:20
5. "She Weaves Shadows" – 4:48
6. "The Closing Walls" – 4:50
7. "Empty Room" – 4:35
8. "Poisonous Tongues" – 4:18
9. "As It Penetrates" – 4:12
10. "Shades of Yesterday" – 4:15

== Personnel ==
- Ronny Thorsen - vocals
- Kjetil Nordhus - clean vocals
- Runar Hansen - guitars
- Kjell Rune Hagen - bass guitar
- Jonathan Pérez - drums

Guest musicians

- Emmanuelle Zoldan - mezzo-soprano vocals
- Bernt Moen - keyboards
