= Acoustic Verses =

Studio album by Green Carnation
- Released: January 30, 2006
- Recorded: 2005
- Studios: Brown Sound Studios, Jailhouse Studios and Dub Studio
- Genres: Acoustic rock; progressive rock
- Length: 43:29
- Label: Sublife Productions
- Producer: Green Carnation

Green Carnation chronology
The Burden Is Mine... Alone (2005)	Acoustic Verses (2006)	Leaves of Yesteryear (2020)

Acoustic Verses is the fifth full-length studio album by the Norwegian progressive metal band Green Carnation. It was released on January 30, 2006, via Sublife Productions.

The album features three songs included on their 2005 EP The Burden Is Mine... Alone: "Sweet Leaf", "The Burden Is Mine... Alone", as well as the cover of Jon English's 1978 international hit "Six Ribbons" (only in the special edition).

== Background ==
Acoustic Verses was another stylistic shift for Green Carnation. On the album, as the name suggests, the band played all acoustic instruments, showing off a softer, warmer style for the band while retaining the progressive and darker feels they established since their debut. Acoustic Verses was a change with respect to the previous works of the group, in which practically all their members participated in its composition.

== Reception ==
Professional ratings
Review scores
Source	Rating
AllMusic	3.5/5 stars
Blabbermouth.net	(8/10)
Chronicles of Chaos	(8/10)
Exclaim!	favorable
Metal Storm	(Avg:8.5/10)
PopMatters	(7/10)

The album was met with positive reviews. Blabbermouth.net rated it with an eight and described it as "it's as lush, orchestrated, and enigmatic as any 'electric' album from this quizzical band".

Laura Taylor of Exclaim! said "similar to Opeth’s Damnation in some respects, Acoustic Verses covers more ground, perhaps in part because of the number of songwriters involved, but the album’s stylistic experimentation is very much in line with the Green Carnation’s proven pattern".

== Track listing ==
No.	Title	Lyrics	Length
1.	"Sweet Leaf"	Tchort	4:38
2.	"The Burden Is Mine...Alone"	Stein Roger Sordal	3:15
3.	"Maybe?"	Kjetil Nordhus	5:02
4.	"Alone"	Tchort (after Edgar Allan Poe)	3:43
5.	"9-29-045 *"	Stein Roger Sordal	15:29
6.	"Childs Play Part III"	Bernt André Moen	3:32
7.	"High Tide Waves"	Tommy Jackson / Music by Michael Smith Krumins	7:49
Total length:			43:29

Limited edition bonus track
No.	Title	Lyrics	Length
8.	"Six Ribbons" (Jon English cover)	Jon English	3:10
Total length:			46:39

*Note

- Track 5 is split up into 3 different parts :
1. "My Greater Cause"
2. "Homecoming"
3. "House of Cards"

== Personnel ==
Green Carnation

- Kjetil Nordhus – vocals
- Terje Vik Schei (a.k.a. Tchort) – guitars
- Michael Smith Krumins – guitars
- Stein Roger Sordal – bass guitar, guitars, vocals
- Kenneth Silden – keyboards
- Tommy Jacksonville – drums
- Bjørn "Berserk" Harstad – guitars

Guest musicians

- Bernt Moen – cello
- Leif Wiese – violin
- Gustav Ekeberg – viola

== Recording information ==
- Engineered and mixed at Brown Sound Studios, except track 4, mixed at Jailhouse Studios.
- Violins, viola and cello recorded at Jailhouse Studios.
- Drums recorded at Dub Studios.
- Mastered at Lynor
- Artwork by Jon Tønnessen
