= A New Dimension of Might =

Studio album by Trail of Tears
- Released: 16 September 2002
- Recorded: February–March 2002
- Studios: Sound Suite Studio, France
- Genres: Gothic metal, symphonic metal
- Length: 49:43
- Label: Napalm Records
- Producers: Terje Refsnes; Trail of Tears

Trail of Tears chronology
Profoundemonium (2000)	A New Dimension of Might (2002)	Free Fall Into Fear (2005)

Professional ratings
Review scores
Source	Rating
Allmusic	3/5 stars

A New Dimension of Might is the third studio album by the band Trail of Tears. The bonus track is a cover of the song "Caffeine" by the band Faith No More, from their album Angel Dust.

== Track listing ==
1. "Ecstatic" – 5:49
2. "A Fate Sealed in Red" – 6:11
3. "Crashing Down" – 4:23
4. "Obedience in the Absence of Logic" – 6:37
5. "Liquid View" – 6:21
6. "Denial and Pride" – 4:08
7. "The Call of Lust" – 5:29
8. "Splendid Coma Visions" – 3:35
9. "Bloodred Trance" – 7:18

Bonus track

10. "Caffeine" (Faith No More cover) – 4:23

== Personnel ==
- Ronny Thorsen – vocals
- Cathrine Paulsen – female vocals
- Runar Hansen – lead guitars
- Terje Heiseldal – guitars
- Kjell Rune Hagen – bass guitar
- Frank Roald Hagen – synthesizers
- Jonathan Pérez – drums
- Peter MacMahon - Sound engineer and Might Specialist

=== Additional musicians ===
- Kjetil Nordhus – vocals
- Damien Surian and Hubert Piazzola – choirs
