= Suspended Animation Dreams =

Studio album by Subterranean Masquerade
- Released: June 21, 2005
- Genre: Progressive metal, avant-garde metal
- Length: 54:50
- Label: The End Records

Subterranean Masquerade chronology
Temporary Psychotic State (2004)	Suspended Animation Dreams (2005)	The Great Bazaar (2015)

Suspended Animation Dreams is a psychedelic progressive metal album by the band Subterranean Masquerade. It is the follow-up to their 2004 EP Temporary Psychotic State, and the second part of a trilogy.

== Track listing ==
All songs written by Tomer Pink.

1. "Suspended Animation Dreams" - 2:26
2. "Wolf Among Sheep" - 6:26
3. "No Place Like Home" - 8:00
4. "Kind of a Blur" - 3:12
5. "The Rock 'n' Roll Preacher" - 9:06
6. "Six Strings to Cover Fear" - 6:48
7. "Awake" - 14:23
8. "X" - 4:28

== Personnel ==
=== Subterranean Masquerade ===
- Paul Kuhr – vocals
- Tomer Pink – guitar, dulcimer, harmonica
- Jake DePolitte – guitar, bass guitar
- Steve Lyman – drums
- Ben Warren – organ, piano, keyboards

=== Additional personnel ===
- Andrew Kuhnhausen – saxophone, clarinet, flute
- Joe Chisholm – trombone
- Dave Chisholm – trumpet
- Bronwen Beecher – violin, viola
- Wayne Burdick – percussion
- Willis Clow – guitar, mandolin, horn, engineering, production
- Mitch Curinga – electronics, vocal recording, engineering, production
- Andrew Kuhnhausen – vocal recording
- Joe Gastwirt – mastering
- Neil Kernon – mixing

== External reviews ==
- Suspended Animation Dreams Review @ Allmusic.com
- Suspended Animation Dreams Review @ Aversionline.com
- Animation Dreams Review @ Metal Perspective
