= Free Fall Into Fear =

Studio album by Trail of Tears
- Released: 28 February 2005
- Recorded: 2004
- Genre: Gothic metal, progressive metal
- Length: 45:01
- Label: Napalm Records
- Producer: Endre Kirkesola

Trail of Tears chronology
| A New Dimension of Might (2002) | Free Fall Into Fear (2005) | Existentia (2007) |

Professional ratings
Review scores
| Source | Rating |
|---|---|
| Allmusic | 3.5/5 stars |

Free Fall Into Fear is the fourth album by Norwegian gothic metal band Trail of Tears.

== Track listing ==
1. "Joyless Trance of Winter" – 4:20
2. "Carrier of the Scars of Life" – 5:31
3. "Frail Expectations" – 5:26
4. "Cold Hand of Retribution" – 4:41
5. "Watch You Fall" – 4:57
6. "The Architect of My Downfall" – 3:41
7. "Drink Away the Demons" – 4:17
8. "Point Zero" – 3:33
9. "Dry Well of Life" – 3:39
10. "The Face of Jealousy" – 4:56

== Personnel ==
- Ronny Thorsen - vocals
- Kjetil Nordhus - vocals
- Runar Hansen - lead guitars
- Terje Heiseldal - guitars
- Kjell Rune Hagen - bass guitar
- Frank Roald Hagen - keyboards
- Jonathan Pérez - drums
