= Oscillation (album) =

- Cover art by Jan Yrlund

Studio album by Trail of Tears
- Released: 26 April 2013
- Recorded: September–October 2011
- Studio: Sound Suite Studio (Marseille)
- Genre: Symphonic metal, gothic metal
- Length: 51:30
- Label: Massacre
- Producer: Terje Refsnes and Trail of Tears

Trail of Tears chronology
| Bloodstained Endurance (2009) | Oscillation (2013) |

Professional ratings
Review scores
| Source | Rating |
|---|---|
| Metal Storm | 7/10 stars |

Oscillation is the seventh studio album by the Norwegian gothic metal band Trail of Tears. It was released on April 26, 2013 under Massacre Records. The album was recorded at Sound Suite Studio in Marseille, France, between September and October 2011, in collaboration with producer Terje Refsnes.

Bjørn Dugstad Rønnow is listed as the band's drummer in the booklet, however, guitarist Bjørn Erik Næss is credited with having performed the drums on this album.

== Background ==
Oscillation was composed and recorded in 2011, during a difficult time for the band, with strong personal differences of Ronny Thorsen with Cathrine Paulsen and the guitarist Bjørn Erik Næss, when these had a partner relationship. Consequently, Thorsen took a more secondary role than usual in this album, while Paulsen was involved in virtually all possible areas of production. The album had significant delays in its release date, after recording between September and October of that year. An additional problem was the expiration of Trail of Tears contract with Napalm Records, extended in late 2007.

In January 2012, Trail of Tears announced that long-time drummer Cato Jensen has parted ways with the band. Bjørn Dugstad Rønnow later joined the band as the new drummer. In fact, none of them participated in the recording sessions made little more than two months earlier in Marseille (Næss was the uncredited session drummer). However, Rønnow was included in the album credits and appeared in all the illustrative photos.

On 11 November 2012, the band revealed the cover artwork, made by Finnish artist Jan Yrlund. The striking cover features a rusty steamship aground on a beach. The concept (with the frozen landscape in grayscale) seem reminiscent of Rammstein's Rosenrot (2005). In preparation for the release of Oscillation, the band signed to Massacre Records.

In January 2013, Ronny Thorsen, Endre Moe, and Bjørn Dugstad Rønnow were announced to have left Trail of Tears. Thorsen has been reported as leaving the band, despite being the only constant member of Trail of Tears since its inception. The remaining members were initially reported to be Cathrine Paulsen and Bjørn Erik Næss; both parties split from one another on acrimonious grounds. According to Thorsen's Facebook statements, Massacre Records gave full support to himself, Moe, and Rønnow, while Oscillation was the final Trail of Tears album, until the band reformed in 2020.

== Releases ==
After long and torturous recording, the album was finally released in Europe on 26 April 2013, almost a year and a half after it was recorded, and with the band already dissolved. In North America, Oscillation was released until 11 June.

The limited edition on digipak includes two bonus tracks: "Sleep Forever" and "Quick Fix of Shame".

About the album title, Thorsen said: "The word oscillation has a wide range of interpretation. For us, we wanted to play around the meaning of duality, balance and contrasts".

== Track listing ==
| No. | Title | Lyrics | Music | Length |
|---|---|---|---|---|
| 1. | "Waves of Existence" | C. Paulsen, R. Thorsen | E. Moe | 4:12 |
| 2. | "Scream Out Loud" | C. Paulsen, R. Thorsen | E. Moe | 4:36 |
| 3. | "Crimson Leads on the Trail of Tears" | C. Paulsen, R. Thorsen | E. Moe | 5:16 |
| 4. | "Oscillation" | C. Paulsen, R. Thorsen | E. Moe | 4:27 |
| 5. | "Path of Destruction" | C. Paulsen | B. Næss | 6:02 |
| 6. | "Vultures Guard My Shadow" | C. Paulsen, R. Thorsen | E. Moe | 4:18 |
| 7. | "The Dawning" | C. Paulsen, R. Thorsen | E. Moe | 4:11 |
| 8. | "Room 306" | C. Paulsen, R. Thorsen | B. Næss | 4:17 |
| 9. | "Our Grave Philosophy" | C. Paulsen, R. Thorsen | B. Næss | 4:52 |
| 10. | "Lost in Life" | C. Paulsen | E. Moe | 5:09 |
| 11. | "Eradicate" | C. Paulsen, R. Thorsen | B. Næss | 4:09 |
| Total length: | | | | 51:30 |

Digipak bonus tracks
| No. | Title | Lyrics | Music | Length |
|---|---|---|---|---|
| 12. | "Sleep Forever" | C. Paulsen, R. Thorsen | E. Moe | 4:15 |
| 13. | "Quick Fix of Shame" | C. Paulsen, R. Thorsen | E. Moe | 3:53 |
| Total length: | | | | 59:38 |

== Personnel ==
=== Trail of Tears ===
- Ronny Thorsen – vocals
- Cathrine Paulsen − soprano
- Bjørn Erik Næss − guitar, drums
- Endre Moe − bass guitar

=== Additional musicians ===
- Audun Grønnestad – additional orchestration, synths and programming

=== Production ===
- Terje Refsnes – producer, engineer, mixing
- Audun Grønnestad – co-producer
- Mika Jussila – mastering at Finnvox Studios, Finland, December 2012
- Jan "Örkki" Yrlund – cover art, design, layout, photography
- Cathrine Paulsen – design concept [cover concept], typography [Handwritten Lyrics]
- Audun Grønnestad, Bjørn Erik Næss, Cathrine Paulsen – mixing
- Mixed At – Mayhem Music Studio in Kristiansand, Norway in 2012
