= Oscillistor =

An oscillistor is a semiconductor device, consisting of a semiconductor specimen placed in magnetic field, and a resistor after a power supply. The device produces high-frequency oscillations, which are very close to sinusoidal.

The basic principle of operation is the effect of spiral unsteadiness of electron-hole (p-n) plasmas.

== See also ==
- Electronic oscillator
