= Jonathan Pérez (musician) =

Chilean drummer

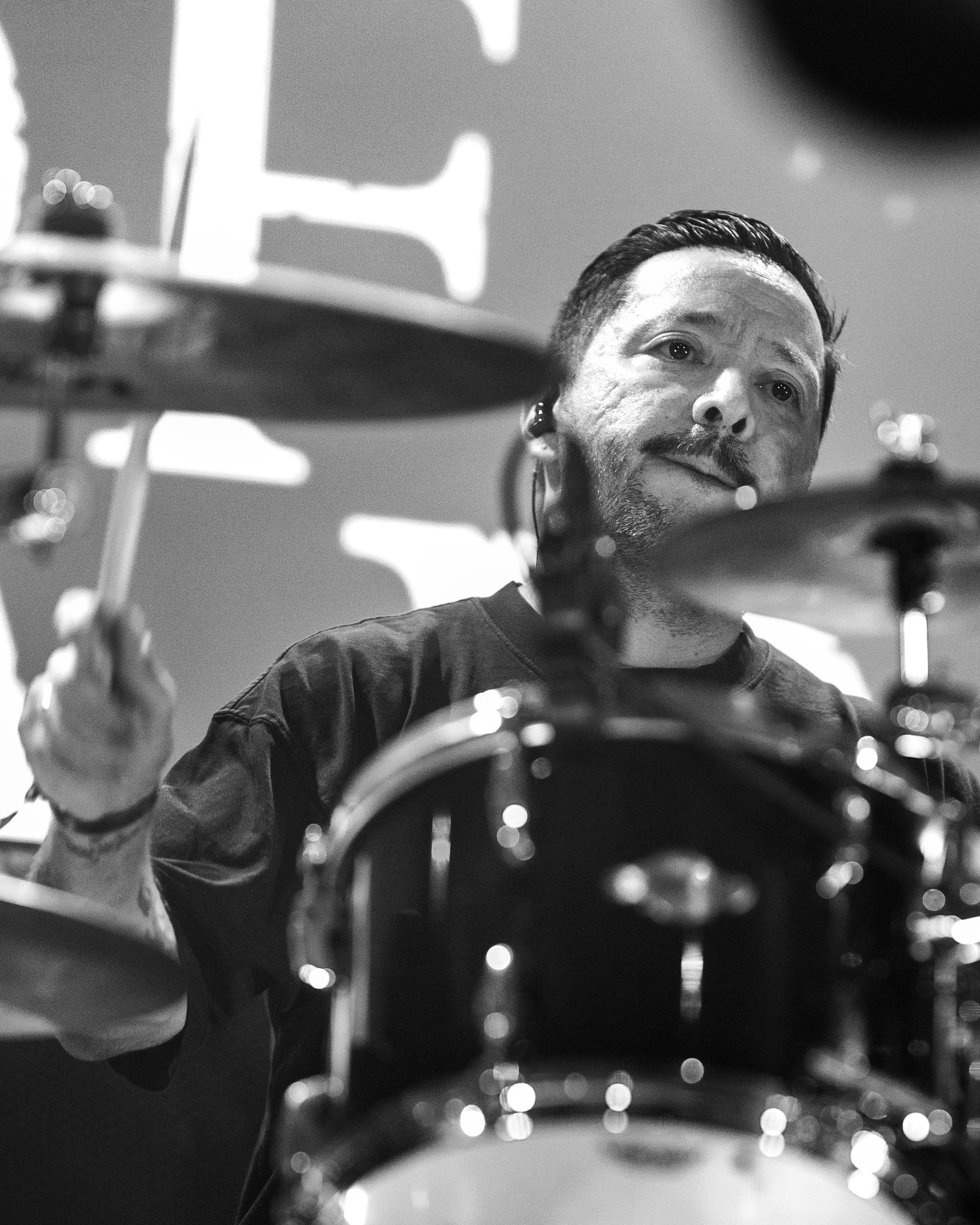
- With Trail of Tears, 2025

Background information
- Born: Jonathan Alejandro Pérez Riveros; Viña del Mar, Chile
- Genres: Gothic metal, doom metal, symphonic metal, salsa, cumbia, pop, rock
- Occupation: Drummer
- Years active: 1997–present
- Member of: Trail of Tears; Sirenia; Green Carnation

Jonathan Alejandro Pérez is a Chilean drummer who is currently based in Kristiansand, Norway. He is known for his work with the Norwegian gothic metal and symphonic metal bands Trail of Tears and Sirenia. He is currently the drummer of Green Carnation since 2016.

== Career ==
Pérez's career in music began at the age 17 of in 1996 with Trail of Tears, a local band. With them he recorded five studio albums and participated in full tours and numerous shows in Europe as well as the first full Mexican tour in June 2003.

In 2004, along with Trail of Tears, he was part of the double album tribute to the Australian group Dead Can Dance, entitled The Lotus Eaters (Tribute To Dead Can Dance). The band performed the song "The Arcane".

During spring and summer 2006, Pérez toured Europe with his band, along with Therion and Tristania, promoting the album Free Fall into Fear, which was published a year earlier. Following the tour, the group recorde its fifth album, Existentia, which was promoted with a new concert tour playing during 2007. However, in November 2006, Pérez finally abandoned Trail of Tears with other members (except the vocalist Ronny Thorsen) because of musical differences and monetary losses. Subsequently, he has been a permanent member of Sirenia, but has not appeared on all recordings of their albums. He was involved in the recording of their mini-CD Sirenian Shores (2004) and on their album Nine Destinies and a Downfall (2007). He is credited on three singles and all music videos that they released until 2019. His arrival coincided with the first great international success of Sirenia, the song "My Mind's Eye" (2007), which topped the radio charts in several countries. The video was widely distributed in Austria, Switzerland, Australia and Germany, and was broadcast on MTV.

Two other more experimental musical projects with lesser-known bands have been Stemplet Falsk ("False Stamp" in Norwegian), which he formed with a former Trail of Tears colleague, guitarist Runar Hansen and, more personally, Sonido Latino (Latin Sound). Neither project has published any material nor released official demos.

In 2016, Perez became an official member of Green Carnation, along with his former Trail of Tears partners Kjetil Nordhus, Michael S. Krumins (who he also played with in Sirenia) and Terje Schei (Tchort) who he played with in Carpathian Forest.

In November 2017, Pérez left Sirenia definitively before a European tour and his position was occupied by the Austrian drummer Roland Navratil.

Jonathan continues to play with Green Carnation and other music projects he's involved in per 2019.

== Personal life ==
Jonathan Pérez left Chile in 1982 (at the age of 3) together with his family and grew up in the city of Kristiansand, Norway, where he developed in the musical environment since his adolescence.

Pérez currently lives in that city and is married to Camilla Fredriksen, with whom he has three sons, Andreas, Robin and Adrian. Besides music, he works for the oil company National Oilwell Varco.

== Discography ==
=== With Trail of Tears ===
- Disclosure in Red (1998)
- Profoundemonium (2000)
- A New Dimension of Might (2002)
- Free Fall Into Fear (2005)
- Existentia (2007)

=== With Sirenia ===
- Sirenian Shores (EP, 2004)
- Nine Destinies and a Downfall (2007)
- "My Mind's Eye" (single and music video, 2007)
- "The Other Side" (music video, 2007)
- "The Path To Decay" (single and music video of The 13th Floor, 2009)
- "Seven Widows Weep" (single and music video of Perils of the Deep Blue, 2013)
- "Once My Light" (single and music video of The Seventh Life Path, 2015)
- "Dim Days of Dolor" (single and music video of Dim Days of Dolor, 2016)

=== With Green Carnation ===
- Last Day of Darkness (live album, 2018)
- Leaves of Yesteryear (2020)
- "The World Without a View" (single, 2020)

=== Various artists ===
- The Lotus Eatethtrs (Tribute To Dead Can Dance) (Trail of Tears appears on "The Arcane") (2004)
