= A Blessing in Disguise =

Studio album by Green Carnation
- Released: 17 June 2003
- Recorded: 2003
- Genre: Progressive metal, gothic metal
- Length: 56:15
- Label: Season of Mist
- Producer: Terje Vik Schei, Green Carnation and pre-produced by Stein Roger Sordal

Green Carnation chronology
Light of Day, Day of Darkness (2001)	A Blessing in Disguise (2003)	The Quiet Offspring (2005)

Professional ratings
Review scores
Source	Rating
Allmusic	4/5 stars
Metal Storm	8/10 stars
Metal Review	Favorable

A Blessing in Disguise is the third full-length studio album of the Norwegian progressive metal band, Green Carnation. The album was released two years after their previous album, Light of Day, Day of Darkness.

== Background ==
This album was a stylistic shift for the band, creating some more "live-friendly" rock songs as opposed to its sixty-minute-long predecessor.

== Track listing ==
No.	Title	Length
1.	"Crushed to Dust"	4:26
2.	"Lullaby in Winter"	7:49
3.	"Writings on the Wall"	5:26
4.	"Into Deep"	6:09
5.	"The Boy in the Attic"	7:13
6.	"Two Seconds in Life"	6:28
7.	"Myron and Cole"	5:53
8.	"As Life Flows By"	4:45
9.	"Rain"	8:06
10.	"Stay on These Roads" (Vinyl bonus track, cover of song by A-ha)	4:17

== Personnel ==
Green Carnation

- Kjetil Nordhus – vocals
- Bjørn Harstad – lead guitar and guitar effects
- Terje Vik Schei (a.k.a. Tchort) – guitar
- Stein Roger Sordal – bass, guitars, and harp
- Bernt A. Moen – keyboards and piano
- Anders Kobro – drums

Guest musicians

- Christiansand Chamber Ensemble
