= Trail of Tears (band) =

Norwegian metal band

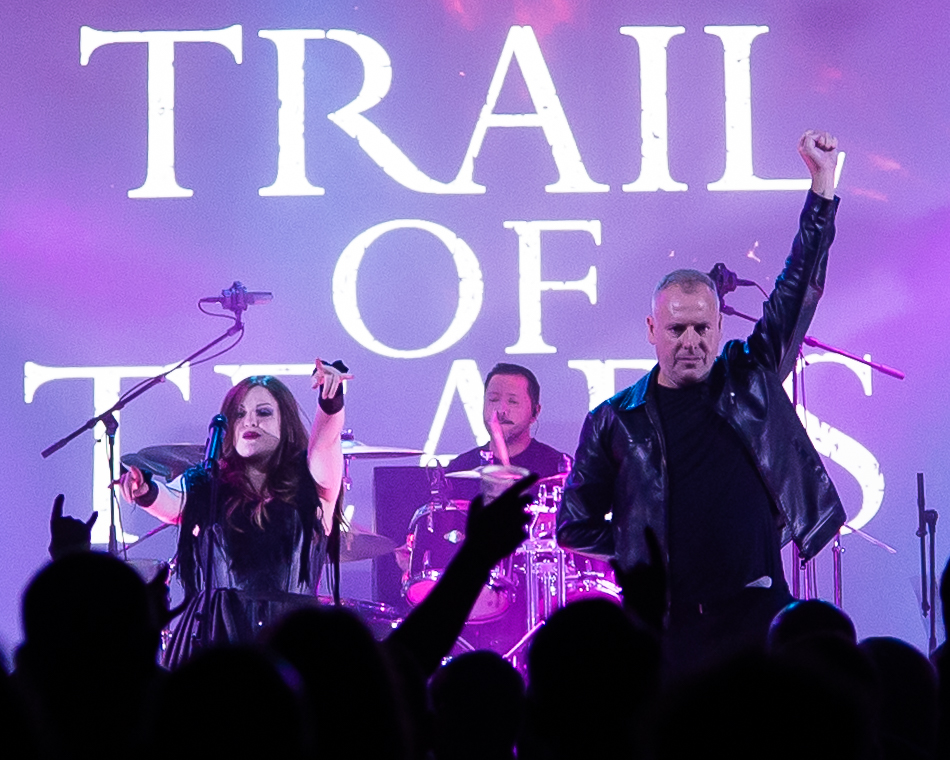

Background information
- Also known as: Natt (1994–1997)
- Origin: Kristiansand, Norway
- Genres: Gothic metal, symphonic metal
- Years active: 1997–2013, 2020–present
- Labels: Massacre, Napalm, The Circle Music
- Members: Ronny Thorsen; Runar Hansen; Jonathan Alejandro Pérez; Endre Moe; Nicolay "Jørni" Johnsen; Ailyn
- Past members: (See below)

Trail of Tears is a Norwegian symphonic gothic metal band formed in 1997. Through most of their career the band emphasised the use of contrasting soprano and death grunt vocals, except for the release of Free Fall into Fear in 2005, in which the band switched this contrast mostly to tenor and growls, with less frequent soprano passages. The band disbanded in 2013, being succeeded by Thorsen's project Viper Solfa. In 2020, they reformed with old and new members, including previous Sirenia vocalist Ailyn.

== History ==
=== Formation and Disclosure in Red (1994–2000) ===
Formed in 1994, the band's initial name was Natt; they were formed by Terje Heiseldal, Kjell Rune Hagen, Jonathan A Perez, Michael Krumins, and Ronny Thorsen. The band recorded a self-titled demo with that name. In 1997 their name was switched to Trail of Tears, in order to reflect the evolution of their sound and the changes that had been made from their initial line-up. The first demo the band recorded was When Silence Cries..., which contained three tracks and was released in April 1997. Guitarist Michael Krumins left the band and was replaced by Runar Hansen shortly thereafter.

The release of the demo lead the band to sign a contract for two albums with Dutch label DSFA Records. Their debut — Disclosure in Red — was released in that same year, and touring through Europe followed, alongside Tristania and The Sins of Thy Beloved.

=== Profoundemonium, A New Dimension of Might, and Free Fall into Fear (2000–2004) ===
Their second album, Profoundemonium, was released in 2000, and female vocalist Helena Iren Michaelsen left the band soon after, being replaced by Cathrine Paulsen in May of that year. The band proceeded to play in Europe several times during 2000. In the following year they signed a three-album deal with Napalm Records. Their third release, released in 2002, was entitled A New Dimension of Might and was produced by Terje Refsnes (producer of Tristania, Sirenia and Green Carnation).

2003 marked the band's first international concert, in Mexico. Female vocalist Catherine Paulsen left the band, and male vocalist Kjetil Nordhus (Green Carnation) joined Trail of Tears. This move prompted several changes in the band's sound, ultimately resulting in the 2004 album Free Fall into Fear, which was markedly heavier than their previous albums. A tour with Tristania and Therion followed the album's release.

=== Existentia and line-up changes (2004–2007) ===
Long term band members Terje Heiseldal and Frank Roald Hagen departed before the recording of the band's fifth album, with Gøran Bomann of Carpathian Forest standing in as a session live guitarist. The album was recorded as a five-piece with Runar Hansen recording all guitars and Bernt Moen being brought in as a guest musician to play keyboards.

Kjetil Nordhus, Runar Hansen, Kjell Rune Hagen, and Jonathan Perez walked out in November 2006 due to bad organisation leading to monetary loss for all the members of the band and posted a statement on the Trail of Tears' website saying the band had split up. Ronny Thorsen soon issued a statement saying they would in fact be carrying on without them and that they couldn't have chosen a worse time to leave the band due to the upcoming tour for the album Existentia. All tour dates had to be cancelled.

On 1 February 2007, it was stated that former Trail of Tears vocalist Cathrine Paulsen re-joined the band. The band was also confirmed for 2007's Sweden Rock Festival, which was then followed with an extensive North American headlining tour alongside Echoes of Eternity and Unexpect.

=== Bloodstained Endurance (2008–2009) ===
The band entered Soundsuite Studio in Marseille, France with Terje Refsnes on 3 November 2008 to record their sixth studio album. Since then, the band completed recording this album, titled Bloodstained Endurance. The album includes 11 songs and a limited edition album with an additional four or five bonus tracks will also be issued. The album was released on 27 May 2009.

=== Oscillation, guitarist and drummer departure (2010–2012) ===
In July 2010, Trail of Tears announced that guitarist Pål Olsen has left the band due to lack of time and wanting to focus more on his band Guardians of Time. The band will continue as a quintet, and the departure, according to the band, will not affect the upcoming live activity or the progress of the upcoming album.

In January 2012, Trail of Tears announced that long-time drummer Cato Jensen has parted ways with the band. Bjørn Dugstad Rønnow later joined the band as the new drummer.

On 11 November 2012, the band revealed the cover artwork, made by Jan Yrlund, of their seventh full-length album Oscillation. In preparation for the release of Oscillation, the band signed to Massacre Records. The album was released on 26 April 2013.

=== Breakup (2013) ===
In January 2013, Ronny Thorsen, Endre Moe, and Bjørn Dugstad Rønnow were announced to have left Trail of Tears. Thorsen has been reported as leaving the band, despite being the only constant member of Trail of Tears since its inception. The remaining members were initially reported to be Cathrine Paulsen and Bjørn Erik Næss; both parties split from one another on acrimonious grounds. According to Thorsen's Facebook statements, Massacre Records gave full support to himself, Moe, and Rønnow, while Oscillation is the final Trail of Tears album. Some months later in 2013, Thorsen, Moe and Rønnow, along with Miriam Renvåg "Sphinx" and Krister Dreyer "Morfeus", formed the band Viper Solfa.

=== Reformation and Winds of Disdain EP (2020–present) ===
Trail of Tears performing in 2025

In October 2020, the band announced that they have returned with new guitarist Nicolay "Jørni" Johnsen and ex-Sirenia vocalist Ailyn, and are planning both new music and anniversary shows where they will play older albums in their entirety.

On January 10, 2024, the band announced they would release the EP Winds of Disdain, on May 24 via The Circle Music.

== Band members ==
=== Current ===
- Ronny Thorsen − vocals (1997–2013, 2020–present)
- Ailyn – clean vocals (2020–present)
- Runar Hansen − lead guitar (1997–2007), rhythm guitar (2020–present)
- Nicolay "Jørni" Johnsen – lead guitar (2020–present)
- Endre Moe − bass (2007–2013, 2020–present)
- Jonathan Alejandro Pérez − drums (1997–2007, 2020–present)

=== Former ===
- Kjell Rune Hagen − bass (1997–2007)
- Terje Heiseldal − rhythm guitar (1997–2005)
- Frank Roald Hagen − keyboards (1997–2006)
- Helena Iren Michaelsen − clean vocals (1997–2000)
- Cathrine Paulsen − clean vocals (2000–2003, 2007–2013)
- Kjetil Nordhus − clean vocals (2004–2007)
- Bjørn Erik Næss − lead guitar (2007–2013)
- Cato Jensen − drums (2007–2012)
- Pål Olsen − rhythm guitar (2007–2010)
- Bjørn Dugstad Rønnow − drums (2012–2013)

== Discography ==
=== Studio albums ===
- Disclosure in Red (1998)
- Profoundemonium (2000)
- A New Dimension of Might (2002)
- Free Fall Into Fear (2005)
- Existentia (2007)
- Bloodstained Endurance (2009)
- Oscillation (2013)

=== EPs ===
- Winds of Disdain (2024)
