= Green Carnation =

Norwegian heavy metal band

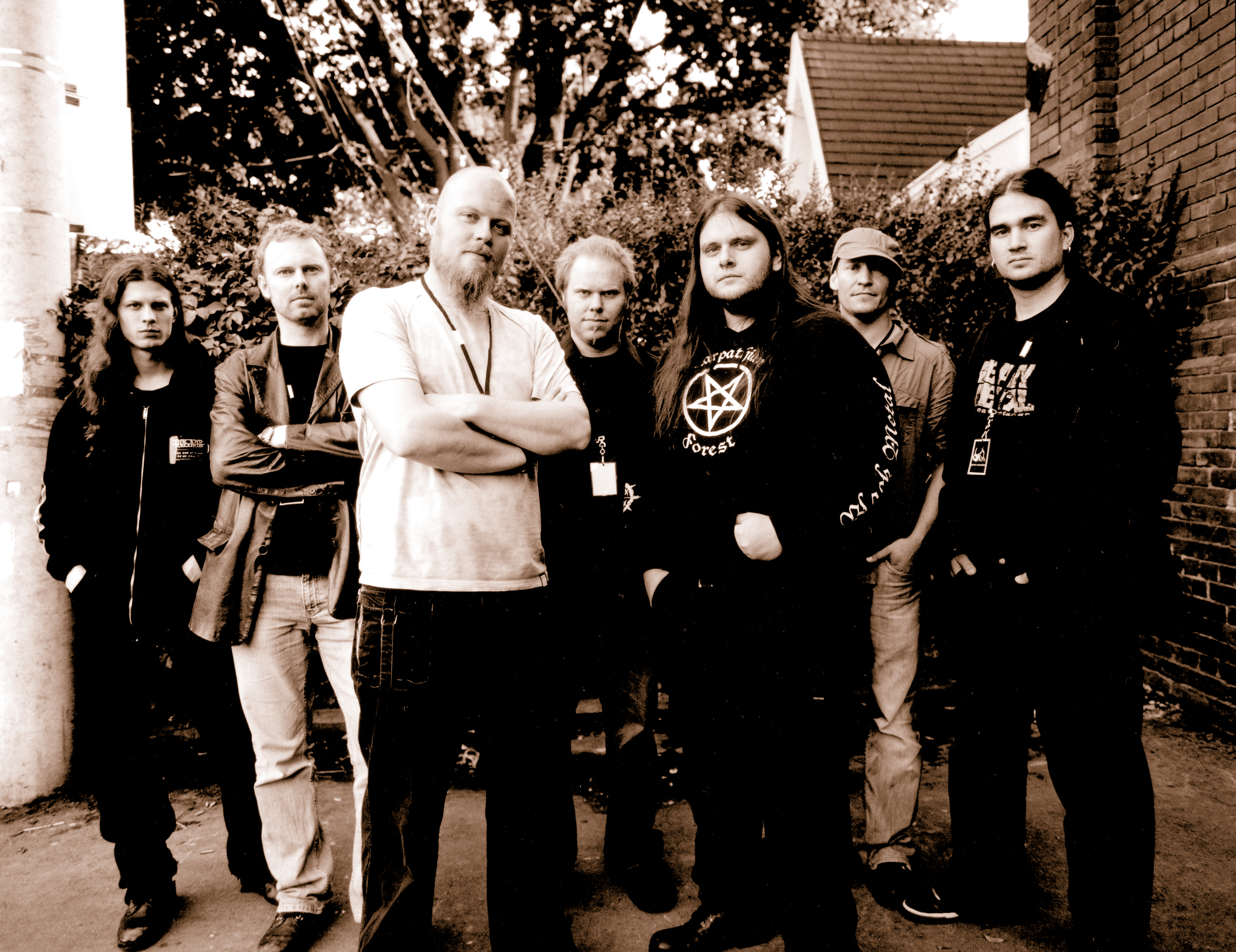
- Green Carnation in 2005, Day of the Equinox Festival in Toronto, Canada. From L-R: Michael Krumins, Bjørn Harstad, Kjetil Nordhus, Kenneth Silden, Terje Vik Schei (Tchort), Tommy Jacksonville, Ole Vistnes

Background information
- Origin: Kristiansand, Norway
- Genres: Progressive metal; doom metal; gothic metal; death metal (early)
- Years active: 1990–1991, 1999−2007, 2014−present
- Labels: Sublife; Prophecy; Season Of Mist; The End
- Spinoffs: In the Woods...
- Members: Terje Vik Schei; Kjetil Nordhus; Stein Roger Sordal; Bjørn Harstad; Jonathan Pérez; Endre Kirkesola
- Past members: (See: former members)

Green Carnation is a Norwegian heavy metal band from Kristiansand, formed in 1990. Originally a death metal band, they have touched other genres such as death-doom, progressive doom, atmospheric gothic metal, and hard rock in their initial run. The band released its first album in 14 years titled Leaves of Yesteryear on May 8, 2020, which sealed their sound to gothic progressive metal. A new single was composed, arranged, rehearsed and they were went on to record “The World Without a View” during the COVID-19 pandemic, "The World Without a View" was released digitally on December 18, 2020. In 2024, the band recorded three albums simultaneously, working off a concept they had formed in the 2000s, with the first of the trio released in 2025.

== History ==
=== Formation and early years (1990–2001) ===
Green Carnation is the creation of former Emperor bass player Terje Vik Schei (a.k.a. Tchort), founded before Tchort joined Emperor in 1990. It eventually split, with the remaining members X-Botteri, Cm:Botteri and Anders Kobro forming In the Woods...

Green Carnation's first album, Journey to the End of the Night, was not recorded until 1999 and was released in 2000 through German record company Prophecy Productions. The release was a folk inspired doom metal album. The Botteri brothers, Alf Tore Rasmussen, and Geir Solli left the band after recording the debut album, and then Anders Kobro from In The Woods... joined up with Tchort. Together, they spent nearly two years making the foundational arrangements for what eventually became Light of Day, Day of Darkness, a single track, 60-minute progressive metal epic which is one of the longest single songs in metal. It established the legacy of the band. They then did a pre-production in the studio with Tchort on guitar, Kobro on drums, and Endre Kirkesola on bass. This was enough to convince guitarist Bjørn Harstad, also of In The Woods..., to join the band in time for the final recording of the album, accompanied by Stein Roger Sordal on bass, Kjetil Nordhus on vocals, and Bernt Moen of Shining on keyboards. Light of Day, Day of Darkness was released in 2001 via Prophecy Productions in Europe, while the US release was handled by The End Records.

=== Genre branching and new identity (2001–2006) ===
Following this release, the band released their 2003 full-length album A Blessing in Disguise through French record label Season Of Mist. The album consisted of a blend of progressive metal/rock elements, slightly gothic tinges, and hard rock elements and brought the band into another musical terrain. Lyrically it leaned into the traumatic childhood of primary lyricist Sordal, whom Metal Injection describes as the band's "emotional core." Bjørn Harstad left the band after the recording of A Blessing, a decision he made due to his other work commitments. Unfortunately Bernt Moen also decided to quit the band due to obligations with other artists and solo projects after the Blessing in Disguise tour of 2003.

Two years later the band followed up with the album The Quiet Offspring, introducing Kenneth Silden on keyboard and Michael Krumins on guitar. The album was released through Season Of Mist in Europe and The End Records in the US. This album brought the band into an even more hard-rock style of music and is seen by many to be their most commercial-sounding release. At this point, they made the decision to replace Anders Kobro with drummer Tommy Jackson (Jacksonville). Jacksonville was a natural choice since he had been a long-time friend and partner of Stein Sordal's other projects, Soxpan, Sordal and Plutho ++). Later in 2005, the band released an EP entitled The Burden Is Mine... Alone. This EP marked the debut of bassist/guitarist Stein Roger Sordal as a lead vocalist in the band, with the song that shares the name of the EP and the song was written and performed entirely by him. Drummer Tommy Jacksonville also debuted as songwriter and lyricist on the EP. He wrote the song "Transparent Me" for the album. This release also worked as a taste of what was to come with their following full-length album.

Early 2006 marked the release of their fifth full-length Acoustic Verses. This album was yet another stylistic shift for the band. On the album, the band played all acoustic instruments, showing off a softer, warmer style for the band while retaining the progressive and darker feels they established since their debut.

=== Hiatus (2007–2014) ===
According to Tchort's writings in the booklet to Acoustic Verses, Green Carnation's next studio release was going to be the second part of "The Chronicles of Doom" trilogy, which began with Light of Day, Day of Darkness, and is going to be titled The Rise and Fall of Mankind.

In February 2007 Green Carnation recorded their second live DVD, A Night Under the Dam, where they played the entire Acoustic Verses album as well as a few other songs. The DVD was recorded under a 30-meter-tall dam in the Norwegian mountains and was the last release to be seen by the band's current line-up.

On August 17, 2007, Tchort announced that due to the poorly organized American tour and subsequent financial and motivational losses, the line up of Green Carnation had split up. He stated that he would

"continue writing music under the name Green Carnation, but probably will never play live again with the band."

The expected album, The Rise and Fall of Mankind, has since been cancelled.

=== Reunion (2014–2024) ===
On February 20, 2014, the band members announced that they would reunite for a second version of A Night Under the Dam on July 31, 2014 . In the same press release, they further announced their availability for festivals and shows. A short documentary about the reunion show has been released on the Norwegian website Eternal-Terror.

On September 10, 2016, Green Carnation made its debut at ProgPower USA (PPUSA) at Center Stage in Atlanta, Georgia. The band played the entire Light of Day, Day of Darkness album.

On August 24, 2018, the group released their third live album, Last Day of Darkness, in DVD/CD format under the Prophecy Productions label. The show was recorded at the Kilden Centre, Kristiansand on November 26, 2016.

The band later announced the recording of their first album in 14 years titled Leaves of Yesteryear. On March 5, 2020, they released the title track as a music video and a single for digital download. On May 6, 2020, the band did a live listening party via YouTube to introduce the world to their sixth studio album.

Produced by Green Carnation and Endre Kirkesola, Leaves of Yesteryear was finally released on May 8, 2020, via Season of Mist. The album was recorded and mixed by Endre Kirkesola, while the mastering was done by mastering engineer Maor Appelbaum.

On November 13, 2020, the band released the single "The World Without a View", only available as a streaming video and digital download via Season of Mist. The song was released digitally on December 18, 2020.

In December 2021, the remastered edition of the 2006-album Acoustic Verses, was released with new cover art and additional songs. It was followed by the single release of "Time in a Bottle", a cover song, originally written by Jim Croce.

=== Trilogy (2025–Present) ===
Around the time of the band's second hiatus, in the mid 2000s,Tchort announced the notion of a trilogy of albums to other members of the band. He was inspired by the poem "Ophelia" by French symbolism poet Arthur Rimbaud. The idea was parked until 2014, when the band signed to produce the trilogy as part of its new record deal. Songwriters Sordal and Nordhus went into retreat for days at a time, working on songs for the albums, which were recorded primarily between April and December 2024. On September 5, 2025, the band released the album A Dark Poem, Pt. 1: The Shores of Melancholia. It has been followed by A Dark Poem, Part II: Sanguis, released on April 3, 2026. The trilogy will conclude with A Dark Poem, Part III: The Messiah Complex, to be released on September 4, 2026.

== Band members ==
=== Current ===
- Terje Vik Schei (a.k.a. Tchort) − guitar (1990–1991, 1998–2007, 2014–present)
- Stein Roger Sordal − bass, vocals, guitar, harp (2001–2006, 2014–present)
- Bjørn "Berserk" Harstad – guitar, slide guitar, ebow (2001–2003, 2006, 2016, 2019–present)
- Kjetil Nordhus − vocals (2001–2007, 2014–present)
- Endre Kirkesola – keyboards (2001, 2016–2017, 2025–present)
- Jonathan Pérez – drums (2016–present)

=== Former ===
- Christopher "C:M." Botteri – bass (1990–1991, 1998–2001)
- Anders Kobro – drums (1990–1991, 2001–2005)
- Christian "X" Botteri – guitar (1990–1991, 1998–2001)
- Richart Olsen – vocals (1990–1991)
- Alf T. Leangel – drums (1998–2001)
- Bernt A Moen – keyboards (2001–2004)
- Øystein Tønnessen – keyboards (2004)
- Michael Krumins − guitar, theremin (2004–2007, 2014–2017, 2022)
- Tommy Jacksonville − drums (2005–2007, 2014–2016)
- Kenneth Silden − keyboards (2005–2007, 2014–2016, 2017–2025)
- Michael Krumins - guitars (2003-2007, 2016-2019)

=== Live session musicians ===
- Ole Vistnes – bass (2005, 2022, 2026)
- Anne Marie Almedal – vocals (2006)
- Trond Breen – guitar (2022–present)

== Discography ==
=== Studio albums ===
Year	Title
2000	Journey to the End of the Night
2001	Light of Day, Day of Darkness
2003	A Blessing in Disguise
2005	The Quiet Offspring
2006	Acoustic Verses (re-released in 2021)
2020	Leaves of Yesteryear
2025	A Dark Poem, Pt. I: The Shores of Melancholia
2026	A Dark Poem, Pt. II: Sanguis
2026	A Dark Poem, Pt. III: The Messiah Complex

=== Ep albums ===
Year	Title
2005	The Burden is Mine...Alone

=== Other releases ===
Year	Title	Format
1991	Hallucinations of Despair	Demo
2004	The Trilogy	Box Set
2004	Alive and Well... In Krakow	Live DVD
2007	A Night Under the Dam	Live DVD
2018	Last Day of Darkness	Live DVD/CD
2020	"The World Without a View"	Single
2021	"My Greater Cause"	Single
2022	"Time in a Bottle" (Jim Croce cover)	Single
2025	"In Your Paradise"	Single
2026	"I Am Time"	Single
2026	"Unconditional Artificial Chemistry"	Single
