= Light of Day, Day of Darkness =

Studio album by Green Carnation
- Released: November 2001
- Recorded: 2001
- Studio: Dub Studio
- Genres: Gothic metal; progressive metal
- Length: 60:06
- Labels: The End, Prophecy Productions
- Producer: Endre Kirkesola

Green Carnation chronology
Journey to the End of the Night (2000)	Light of Day, Day of Darkness (2001)	A Blessing in Disguise (2003)

Professional ratings
Review scores
Source	Rating
Allmusic	3/5 stars

Light of Day, Day of Darkness is the second studio album by the Norwegian progressive metal band Green Carnation. It was released by German record label Prophecy Productions in November 2001.

== Background ==
The album was composed, written and arranged by founding member Terje Vik Schei (a.k.a. Tchort). It is composed of a single 60-minute track and was largely inspired by the death of Tchort's daughter and dedicated to his son, Damien Aleksander, whose baby voice appears a few moments in the song. It is said that 600 different samples were used in the editing of the song.

== Track listing ==
No.	Title	Music	Length
1.	"Light of Day, Day of Darkness"	Tchort	60:06
Total length:			60:06

== Personnel ==
Green Carnation

- Terje Vik Schei (Tchort) − acoustic guitar, electric guitar
- Bjørn Harstad − lead guitar, slide guitar, ebow
- Stein Roger Sordal − bass guitar
- Anders Kobro − drums
- Kjetil Nordhus − vocals

Guest musicians and singers

- Endre Kirkesola − B3, sitar, synthesizer, string, voice arrangements, additional bass
- Bernt A. Moen − string arrangements
- Arvid Thorsen − saxophone
- Synne Soprana − female vocals
- Roger Rasmussen − screaming vocals
- Damien Aleksander − child's voice
- Jan Kenneth T. − male vocals

Children's Choir performed by:

- Randesund Barnekor
- Marthe Larsen
- Julie Pettersen
- Mathias Pettersen
- Kristoffer Knoff Aamot
- Karoline Knoff Aamot
- Ida Margrethe Karterud
- Thomas Karterud
- Simen Ingebrethsen
- Christian Albert
- Even Albert
- Stian Andre Rosenlov
- Elin Wikstol − Conductor

Opera Choir performed by:

- Kjetil Nordhus (tenor)
- Roald Andreas Sandoy (tenor)
- Katinka Sandoy (alto)
- Maren Stakkeland (alto)
- Elise Tverrli (alto)
- Nina Tanggaard (soprano)
- Therese Fanebust (soprano)
- Endre Kirkesola (bass)

Strings by:

- Endre Kirkesola
- Bernt A. Moen

== Production ==
- Produced & Engineered By Endre Kirkesola
- Mastered By Audun Strype
