= Sanrabb =

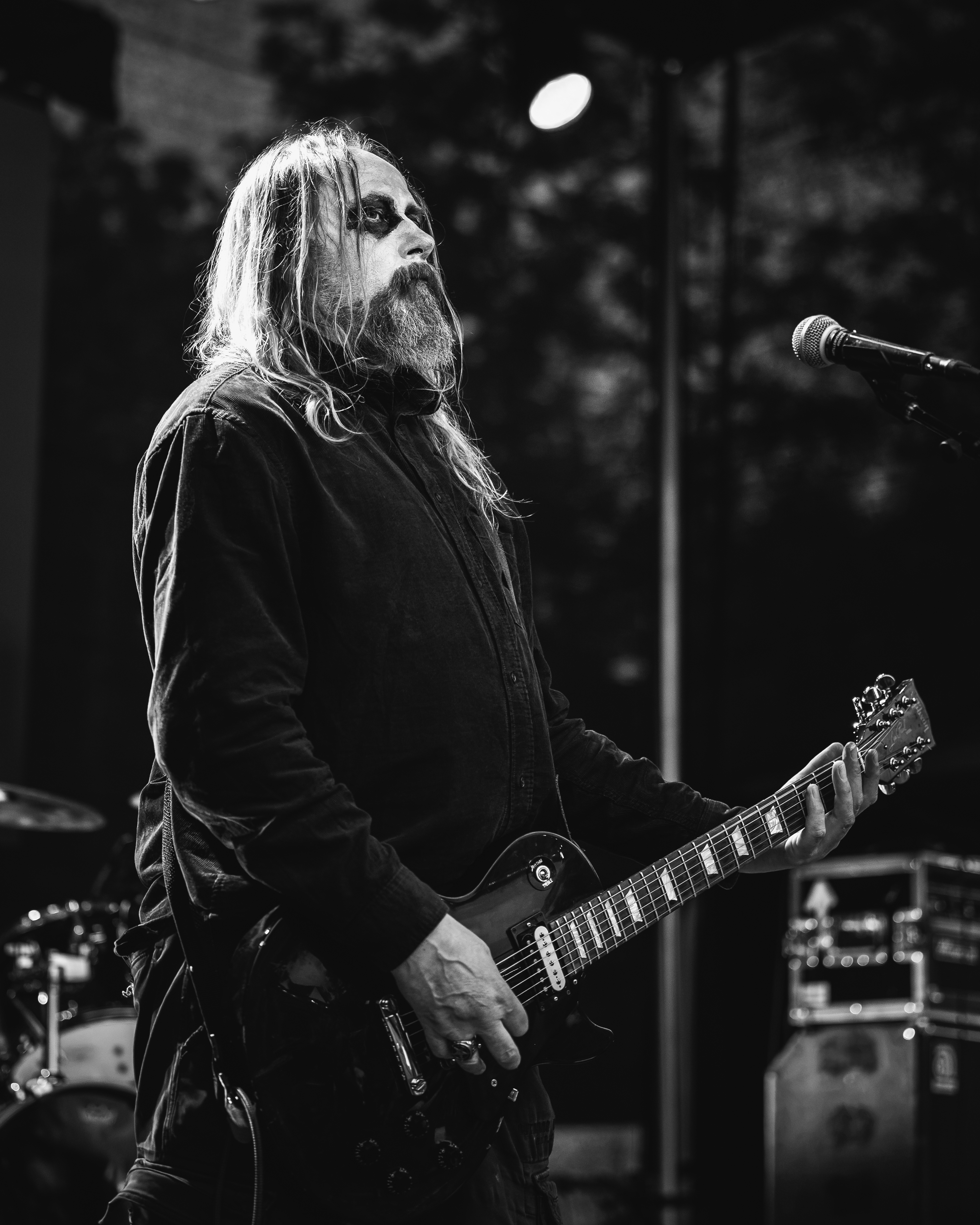
- Sanrabb in 2026

Background information
- Also known as: Sanrabb Aske; Morten
- Born: Stavanger, Norway
- Genre: Black metal
- Instruments: Vocals, guitar, bass
- Years active: 1993–present
- Member of: Gehenna

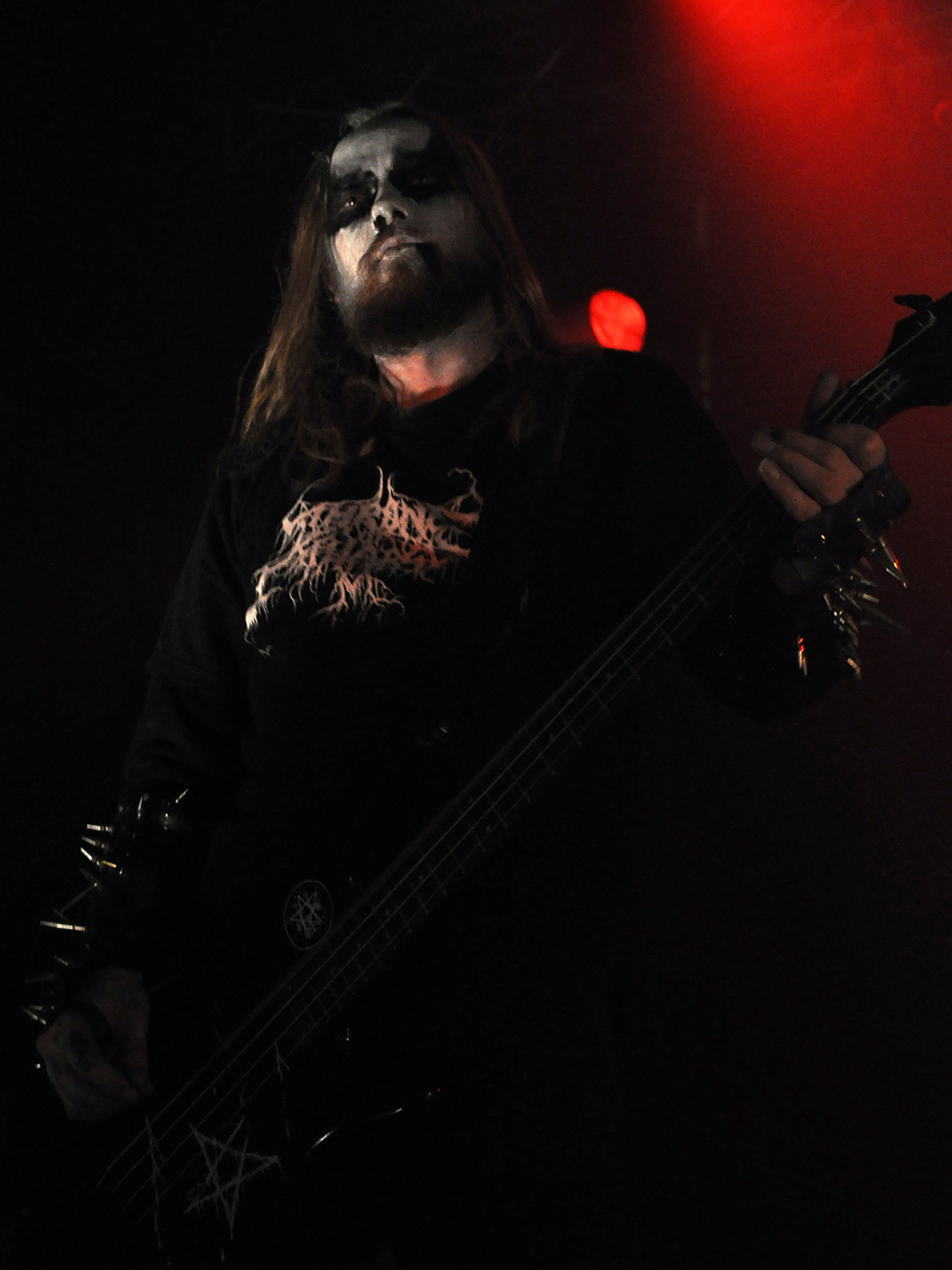
Sanrabb in 2011

Morten Furuly (born 13 November 1975), also known as Sanrabb, is a Norwegian black metal musician and one of the founding members of black/death metal band Gehenna.

== Biography ==
Sanrabb formed Gehenna in 1993, together with Dolgar and Sir Vereda. He has participated on all of Gehenna's releases, both as a vocalist and as a guitarist. During the period between 1999 and 2003, when it was unclear whether the band would continue, Sanrabb was the only member actively working on Gehenna projects.

In addition to Gehenna, Sanrabb has played in several other extreme metal bands, and he has done session live guitars for bands such as Mayhem and Satyricon.

== Reception ==
In a review of the Gehenna album Unravel (2013), Angry Metal Guy wrote, "Sanrabb’s vox are in top form", describing his "dragged out scream in 'The Decision'" as "a kind of a strained, gut-wrenching, throaty sort of half growl/half scream that brings to mind the anguished lamentations of John Haughm during the early, unpolished days of a young Agalloch".

== Associated bands ==
=== Current ===
- Gehenna - 1993–present (vocals, guitar)
- Doedsvangr - 2026–present (bass)

=== Former ===
- Neetzach - 1993-1994 (guitar)
- Forlorn - 1996-1999 (vocals)
- Satyricon - 1999 (session live guitar)
- Mëkanïk - 2000 (guitar)
- Cobolt 60 - 2002 (session live vocals and bass)
- Shadow Season - 2003 (studio guest vocals)
- Mayhem - 2004 (session live guitar)
- Nattefrost - 2005 (studio guest vocals)
- 122 Stab Wounds
- The Deviant
- Haggis
- Blood Red Throne
- Throne of Katarsis - 2009–2016 (bass)

== Discography ==
=== Gehenna ===
- Black Seared Heart (demo) (1993)
- Ancestor of the Darkly Sky (7") (1993)
- First Spell (1994)
- Seen Through the Veils of Darkness (The Second Spell) (1995)
- Malice (1996)
- Black Seared Heart (Re-release of the 1993 demo, with bonus tracks) (1996)
- Deadlights (EP) (1998)
- Adimiron Black (1998)
- Murder (2000)
- WW (2005)
- Unravel (2013)

=== Neetzach ===
- Pinseltronen (demo) (1995)

=== Forlorn ===
- Forlorn (demo) (1996)
- The Crystal Palace (1997)

=== Shadow Season ===
- The Frozen (2003)

=== Nattefrost ===
- Terrorist - Nekronaut Pt. 1 (2005)

=== Mëkanïk ===
- Dër Mëkanïk Grööves (EP) (2008)

=== Throne of Katarsis ===
- Profetens siste vandring (single) (2011)
- Ved graven (2011)
- The Three Transcendental Keys (2013)
