= Fuck You All!!!! Caput tuum in ano est =

Studio album by Carpathian Forest
- Released: 16 June 2006
- Recorded: ANP Studio and Vranglyd Studio, Norway; Spring/Winter 2005
- Genre: Black metal
- Length: 46:14
- Label: Season of Mist
- Producer: Daniel Vrangsinn

Carpathian Forest chronology
We're Going to Hollywood for This: Live Perversions (2004)	Fuck You All!!!! Caput tuum in ano est (2006)

Fuck You All!!!! Caput tuum in ano est is the fifth studio album by Norwegian black metal band Carpathian Forest. It was released on 16 June 2006 via Season of Mist, and as of 2026 it is their most recent release. It is also their first (and only) release with guitarist Gøran Bomann (a.k.a. "Blood Pervertor") on the band's line-up, and their last one with Tchort — both parted ways with Carpathian Forest in 2014 to form The 3rd Attempt.

Contrasting with the symphonic approach of their previous album, Defending the Throne of Evil, Fuck You All!!!! is a throwback to Carpathian Forest's earlier, rawer musical style, reminiscent of their debut Black Shining Leather.

The album's subtitle is Latin for "Your head is in [your] anus".

== Track listing ==
All tracks are written by Nattefrost.

No.	Title	Length
1.	"Vi åpner porten til helvete..." (Norwegian for "We Open the Gates of Hell...")	6:36
2.	"The Frostbitten Woodlands of Norway"	4:58
3.	"Start Up the Incinerator (Here Comes Another Useless Fool)"	5:12
4.	"Submit to Satan!!!"	4:07
5.	"Diabolism (The Seed and the Sower)"	4:14
6.	"Dypfryst/Dette er mitt helvete" (Norwegian for "Deep Frozen/This Is My Hell")	4:04
7.	"Everyday I Must Suffer!"	4:17
8.	"The First Cut Is the Deepest"	4:45
9.	"Evil Egocentrical Existentialism"	3:47
10.	"Shut Up, There Is No Excuse to Live..."	4:14

== Personnel ==
Carpathian Forest

- Roger Rasmussen (Nattefrost) — vocals, guitars, effects
- Terje Vik Schei (Tchort) — guitars
- Anders Kobro — drums, percussion
- Daniel Vrangsinn — bass, effects
- Gøran Bomann (Blood Pervertor) — guitars

Guest musicians

- Ian Tore Narvarsete — backing vocals
- Tom C. Miriam — backing vocals

Other staff

- Ms. S. Angelcunt — photography, artwork, graphics
- Valle Adžić — mixing
- Vrangsinn — engineering, production
