= Misantrof ANTIRecords =

Misantrof ANTIRecords is a non-profit label founded by Daniel Vrangsinn of Carpathian Forest in January 2007. Originally it was started as a web site to host Hatepulse music, but during the summer of 2007 Eirik Skrangle and A Waste of Talent was added to the roster. Misantrof also started building an archive which contains metal albums and demos which are considered important. Many of the demos and albums were collected by Dirge Rep (Orcustus, Gehenna)

In mid-2007 Vrangsinn was joined by Harry Stapleton, and Misantrof was born. The philosophy behind Misantrof ANTIRecords is that all their artists' music is available for free download. Fans are encouraged to share the music among their friends. In the future the label will release some of these albums in vinyl format with thought being put into artwork and other extras in order to make the album special. The long-term intent of Misantrof is to be a place where all art forms come together, and create a massive display, each piece enhancing the other, a place where creative people are free to express themselves is any art form free from any notion of commercialisation.

Misantrof is currently run by a board consisting of musicians and music fans. Other musicians which have joined Vrangsinn on the board are Pål Robert Sæther(chairman), Øystein Ariansen(artist relations).

Misantrof is unusual in that all artists keep the rights to their music: It's intended as a way to show the music industry how a label should operate and to demonstrate that artists can receive a much fairer percentage of the profits. Misantrof releases music without any commercial consideration, and looks for quality music but more importantly originality in its artists.

== Misantrof Artists ==
=== ANTIRecord Artists ===
- A Waste of Talent
- Eirik Skrangle
- Töxic Death
- Machine Insufficiency
- Vrangsinn
- DOS HELLHypnosis
- Plaag
- The Small Penis Syndromes
- Avstand
- Beyond The Morninglight
- Episode 13
- Glomb
- Memoria
- Nierty
- Profane Prayer

=== Archive Artists ===
- Amok
- Bloodline
- Deathcult
- Dispatched
- Hatepulse
- Lidskjalv
- Los Bongos
- Nidingr
- Orcustus
- Slavia
