= Nattefrost =

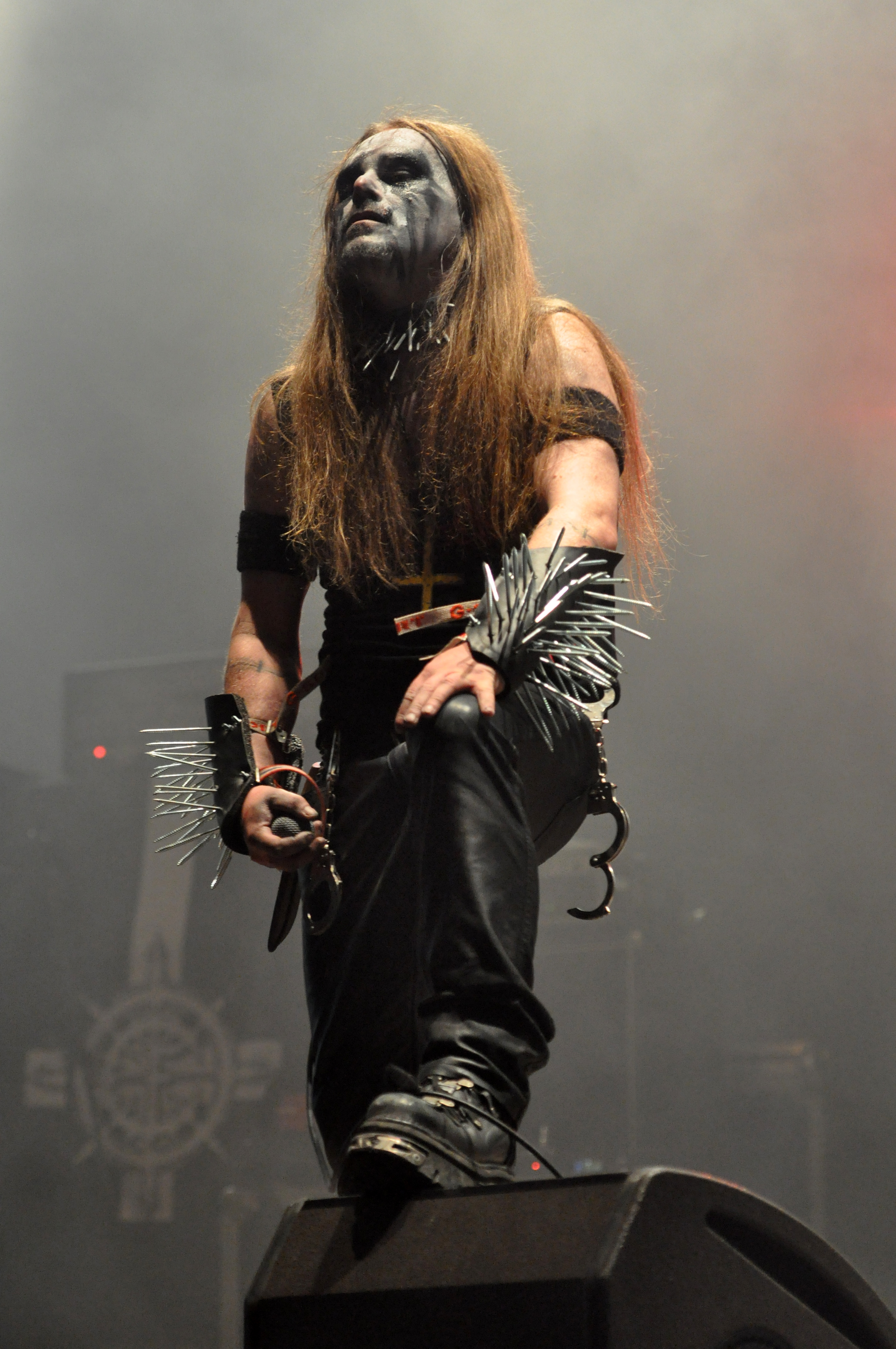
- Nattefrost performing live in 2013

Background information
- Also known as: Lord Nosferatu
- Born: Roger Rasmussen; 12 October 1974 (age 51); Sandnes, Rogaland, Norway
- Genre: Black metal
- Occupation: Musician
- Instruments: Vocals, drums, guitar, bass, keyboards
- Years active: 1990–present
- Label: Season of Mist
- Member of: Carpathian Forest, World Destroyer, Kreft

Roger Rasmussen (born 12 October 1974), stage name Nattefrost, is a Norwegian musician best known as the vocalist and a founding member of black metal band Carpathian Forest. He fronts the side projects World Destroyer and Kreft, and since 2003, his own solo project.

== Biography ==
Rasmussen was born in Sandnes, Rogaland County, Norway. His first musical experience was with black metal band The Childmolesters, which he founded in 1990 alongside future Carpathian Forest bandmate Johnny "Nordavind" Krøvel. The band became Enthrone, which changed its name to Carpathian Forest in 1992. During Carpathian Forest's first years, Nattefrost used the pseudonym Lord Nosferatu. He would not be known as "Nattefrost" (Norwegian for "Night frost") until 1995, when the band released its first EP, Through Chasm, Caves and Titan Woods.

In 2000, Nattefrost formed the side project World Destroyer with Eivind Kulde and Carpathian Forest bandmate Daniel Vrangsinn. The band released the demo album Diabolical Quest, in 2004; it is their only release. He formed the duo Kreft in 2011 with Patolog Falk, releasing the EP Lommemannen that year.

In 2003, Nattefrost announced a solo project. The following year, he released his first album, Blood & Vomit. His second album, Terrorist (Nekronaut, Part I), came out the following year and featured guest appearances by numerous musicians, such as Carl-Michael Eide, Sanrabb of Gehenna and Hoest of Taake. He released the live 2006 EP Drunk and Pisseskev at Ringnes 2004, recorded during his first show, in Ringnes. A compilation of rarities, Hell Noise and Live Terrorism, came out in 2008.

Nattefrost's latest release was the 2009 split album Engangsgrill with Darkthrone's Fenriz's doom metal side project, Red Planet.

In 2016, he collaborated with Urgehal, providing vocals and lyrics for the song "Endetid", off their seventh album, Aeons in Sodom. He collaborated with Green Carnation (on Light of Day, Day of Darkness), Taake (on Hordalands doedskvad) and Aura Noir (on The Merciless).

== Discography ==
=== With Carpathian Forest ===
For a more comprehensive list, see Carpathian Forest#Discography

- 1998: Black Shining Leather
- 2000: Strange Old Brew
- 2001: Morbid Fascination of Death
- 2003: Defending the Throne of Evil
- 2006: Fuck You All!!!! Caput tuum in ano est

=== Solo ===
- 2004: Blood & Vomit
- 2005: Terrorist (Nekronaut, Part I)
- 2006: Drunk and Pisseskev at Ringnes 2004 (EP)
- 2008: Hell Noise and Live Terrorism (compilation)
- 2009: Engangsgrill (split with Fenriz' Red Planet)

=== With World Destroyer ===
- 2004: Diabolical Quest (demo)

=== With Kreft ===
- 2011: Lommemannen (EP)

=== As a session member ===
Green Carnation

- 2001: Light of Day, Day of Darkness (harsh vocals)

Aura Noir

- 2004: The Merciless (additional vocals in "Funeral Thrash")

Taake

- 2005: Hordalands doedskvad (additional vocals in "Hordalands doedskvad I")

Urgehal

- 2016: Aeons in Sodom (vocals and lyrics for "Endetid")
