= Morbid Fascination of Death =

Studio album by Carpathian Forest
- Released: 2001
- Recorded: Sound Suite Studios, January 2000
- Genre: Black metal
- Length: 46:12
- Label: Avantgarde Music
- Producer: Carpathian Forest and Terje Refsnes

Carpathian Forest chronology
| Strange Old Brew (2000) | Morbid Fascination of Death (2001) | We're Going to Hell for This (2002) |

Morbid Fascination of Death is the third studio album by the Norwegian black metal band Carpathian Forest. It was released in 2001 by Avantgarde Music, and it was the last album to feature guitarist and founding member Johnny "Nordavind" Krøvel on the band's line-up. It was also their last studio album to be released by Avantgarde before they switched to Season of Mist.

It was re-released in 2007 by Peaceville Records under digipack form, with two bonus tracks.

The track "Carpathian Forest" is a re-recorded version of the eponymous track present in their debut EP, Through Chasm, Caves and Titan Woods.

== Track listing ==
All tracks are written by Nattefrost and Nordavind unless noted.

| No. | Title | Writer(s) | Length |
|---|---|---|---|
| 1. | "Fever, Flames and Hell" | | 2:31 |
| 2. | "Doomed to Walk the Earth as Slaves of the Living Dead" | | 3:12 |
| 3. | "Morbid Fascination of Death" | | 2:28 |
| 4. | "Through Self-Mutilation" | | 2:58 |
| 5. | "Knokkelmann" (Norwegian for "Bone-Man") | | 3:42 |
| 6. | "Warlord of Misanthropy" | | 2:43 |
| 7. | "A World of Bones" | | 4:43 |
| 8. | "Carpathian Forest" | Nattefrost | 2:06 |
| 9. | "Cold Comfort" | | 5:08 |
| 10. | "Speechless" | | 3:27 |

Peaceville Records 2007 digipak re-issue bonus tracks
| No. | Title | Writer(s) | Length |
|---|---|---|---|
| 11. | "Ghoul" (Mayhem cover) | Euronymous, Necrobutcher, Manheim | 3:40 |
| 12. | "Nostalgia" (demo version) | | 9:34 |

== Personnel ==
Carpathian Forest

- Roger Rasmussen (Nattefrost) — vocals, guitars, synthesizer, choir on "Fever, Flames and Hell"
- Anders Kobro — drums, percussion
- Daniel Vrangsinn — bass, synthesizer
- Terje Vik Schei (Tchort) — bass
- Johnny Krøvel (Nordavind) — guitars, synthesizer, choir on "Fever, Flames and Hell"

Session musicians

- C. Alucard — speech on "Morbid Fascination of Death"
- Nina Hex — female backing vocals on "Doomed to Walk the Earth as Slaves of the Living Dead"
- Eivind Kulde — backing vocals on "Knokkelmann" and "Carpathian Forest"
- Arvid Thorsen (Mötorsen) — tenor saxophone on "Cold Comfort" and "Nostalgia"

Other staff

- E. Øvestad — artwork (logo)
- Lorenzo Mariani — cover art
- Roxy Ueland — photography
- Terje Refsnes — engineering, production
