= Taake =

Norwegian black metal band

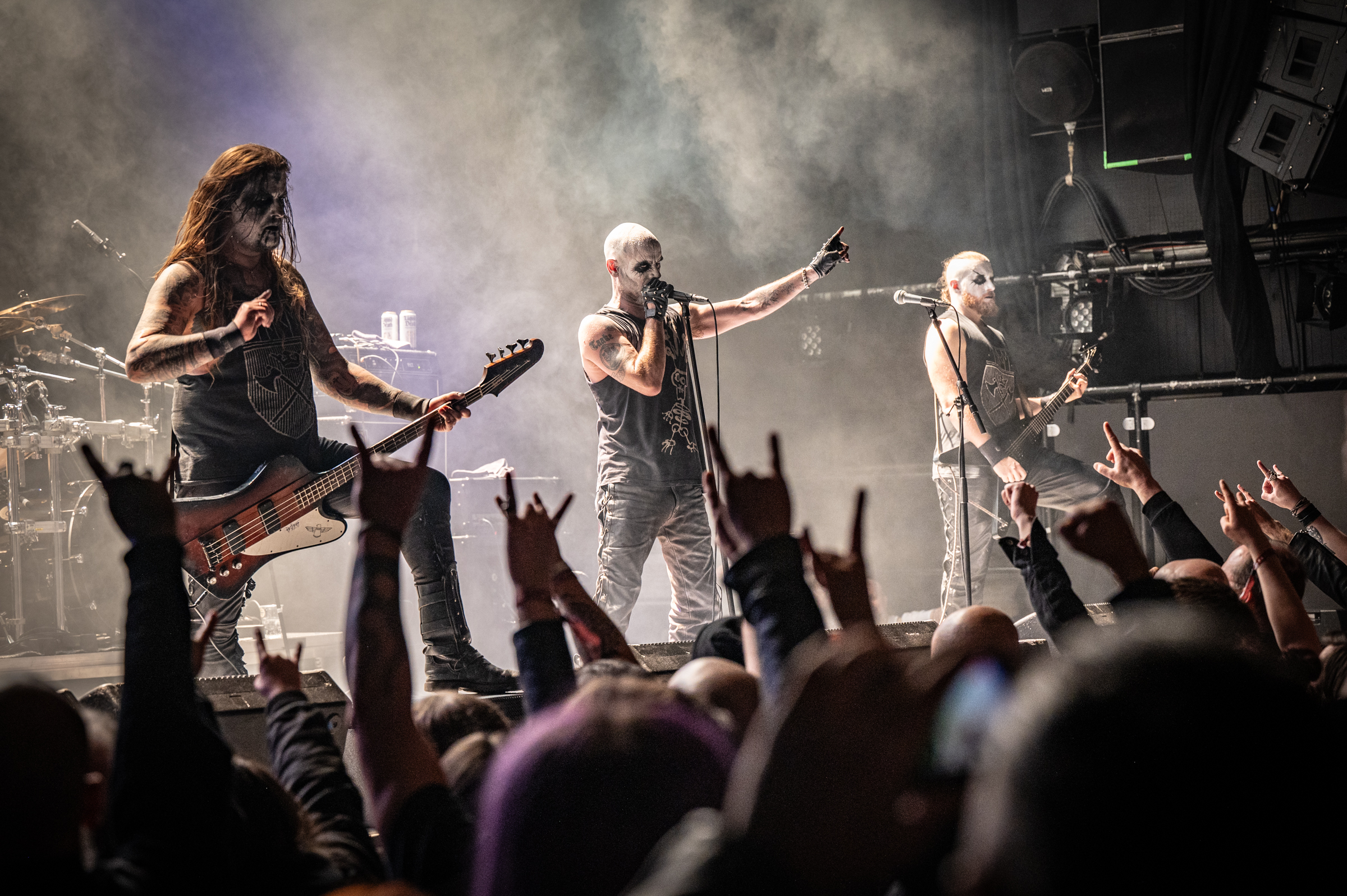
- Taake at Inferno Metal Festival in Norway, 2024; Foto: Birgit Fostervold

Background information
- Also known as: Thule
- Origin: Bergen, Norway
- Genre: Black metal
- Years active: 1993–present
- Labels: Wounded Love, Peaceville, Dark Essence, Svartekunst
- Members: Hoest

Taake (Norwegian: [ˈtôːkə]) is a Norwegian black metal band from Bergen, formed in 1993 and originally named Thule. The band's one continuous member is Hoest, who writes all and records most of the music. Taake has released eight full-length albums and several EPs. The band describes itself as "True Norwegian black metal", and Hoest said he wants to "awaken national pride and cultural nostalgia" in Norwegian listeners as well as to remind people "that Hell is right here on Earth and that humans can be demons". All lyrics are in Hoest's native dialect and are printed in Norse runes. Taake is the old spelling of the Norwegian word tåke, meaning "fog".

== History ==
=== Formation and early years (1993–1996) ===
In 1993, Ørjan Stedjeberg, then known as 'Ulvhedin', formed Taake under the name Thule, together with drummer 'Svartulv'. Thule released two demos, Der Vinterstormene raste in 1993 and Omfavnet av svarte Vinger in 1994. Shortly after, the band changed its name to Taake and 'Ulvhedin' adopted the new pseudonym 'Hoest' (meaning "autumn" in Norwegian). In 1995, they released the demo Manndaudsvinter with session vocalist Dim. This was followed in 1996 by a 7" EP called Koldbrann i Jesu Marg. Drummer Svartulv was excluded from the band that same year.

=== Album trilogy (1997–2005) ===
Between 1999 and 2005, Taake released three full-length albums. They are a trilogy of concept albums linked by the topics of "death, Norway, and the devil in man".

The first full-length album, Nattestid, was released by Wounded Love Records in 1999. The album was written entirely by Hoest, but he brought in a session musician, 'Tundra', to perform bass guitar and drums. It was recorded throughout 1997 and 1998 at the Grieg Hall.

The second installment of the trilogy, Bjoergvin, was released in 2002 by Wounded Love Records. On this record, Hoest surrounded himself with a band: second guitarist 'C. Corax', bassist and pianist 'Keridwen', and drummer 'Mutt' (Gaahlskagg, Trelldom, Sigfader).

The final installment of the trilogy, Doedskvad, was released in 2005 by Dark Essence Records. It features second guitarist 'C. Corax', bassist 'Lava' and drummer 'Mord'. It also features several guest vocalists, including 'Nattefrost' (Carpathian Forest), 'Nordavind' (Carpathian Forest) and 'Taipan' (Orcustus).

=== Brief hiatus and further releases (2006–2012) ===
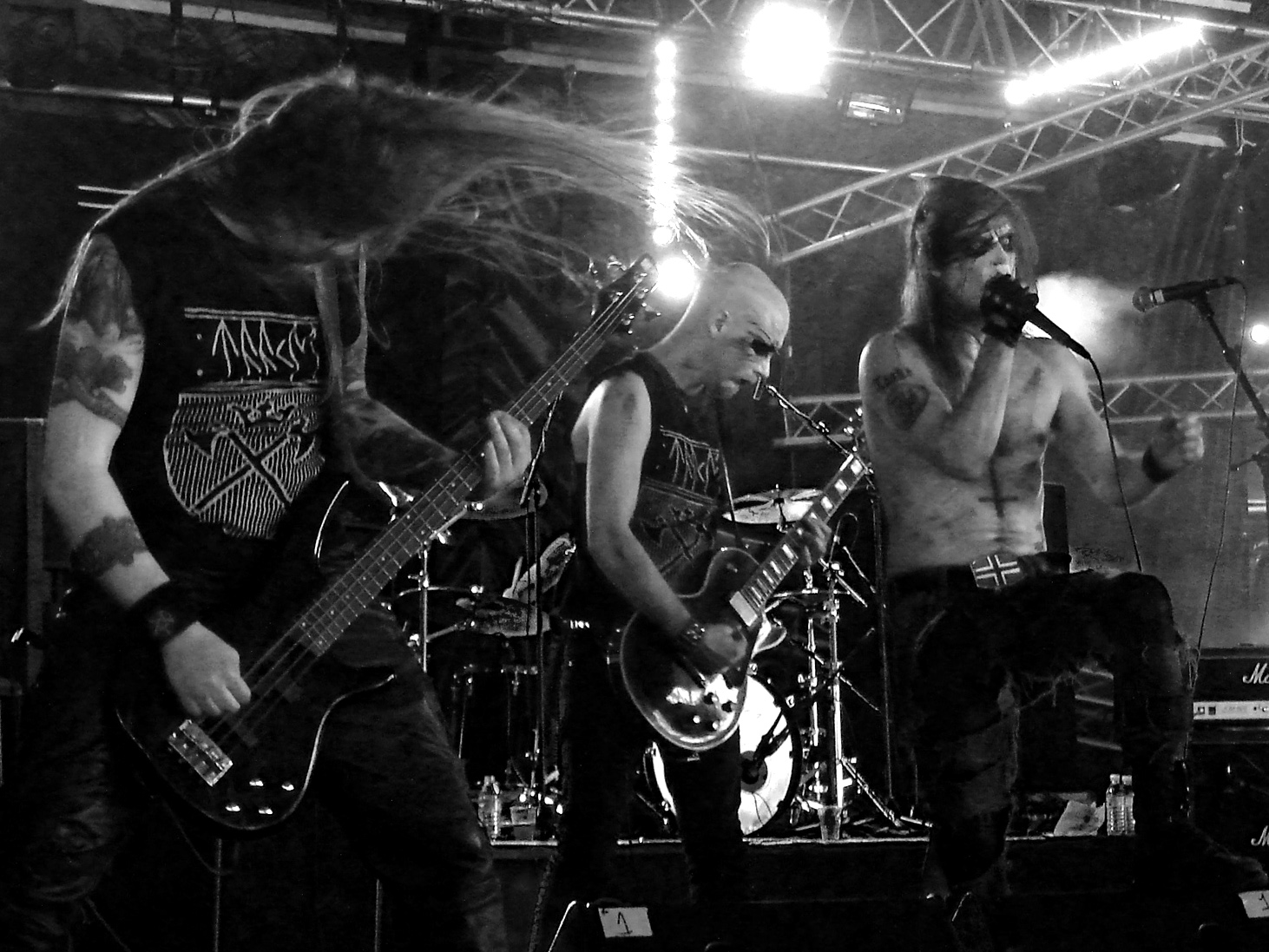
Taake at Hellfest 2009

Over the following three years, Taake released four EPs and played a few festivals (most notably the Hole in the Sky Festival in Norway, with Ivar Bjørnson of Enslaved on guitar), but according to Hoest, Taake was "on ice for a while". During a show in Essen in March 2007, Hoest appeared on-stage with a swastika painted on his chest, causing the band to be removed from two festivals and attracting much controversy. At the same time, Lava, who had been the band's bassist since 2002, left Taake.

In 2008, Taake's fourth album was released, recorded entirely by Hoest and titled Taake. The album was recorded for Hoest's own label Svartekunst Produksjoner and distributed through Dark Essence Records.

In 2011, Taake released the EP Kveld, featuring both new and re-recorded songs. The release was followed up that same year by Taake's fifth full-length album, Noregs vaapen. The album featured several prominent black metal artists, including Attila Csihar, Nocturno Culto, Demonaz and Ivar Bjørnson. It was released on Svartekunst Produksjoner to much critical acclaim. The album was nominated for the Norwegian Spellemann award in the Metal category. The nomination was met with some derision due to anti-Islamic lyrics.

=== Recent activity (2013–present) ===
To mark the band's 20th anniversary, Taake released the compilation album Gravkamre, kroner og troner in 2013. Taake played their first show in the United States in May 2014 at Maryland Deathfest in Baltimore. That same year, Taake released their sixth full-length album Stridens hus and the EP Kulde through Dark Essence Records. In support of the record and as a follow-up to their show in Maryland, Taake announced a first-time US tour with a scheduled start in June 2015.

In 2017, Taake released their seventh studio album, Kong Vinter, along with the EP Baktanker and the compilation album 7 Fjell. Taake were forced to cancel a planned 2018 US tour due to a campaign by Antifa. In 2020, Taake released the split EPs Pakt and Jaertegn. The releases were followed up by an additional split EP, Henholdsvis, and the compilation album Avvik in 2021. Taake released their eight studio album, Et hav av avstand, in September 2023 and ninth studio album, En skog av nidstang in July 2026.

== Controversies ==
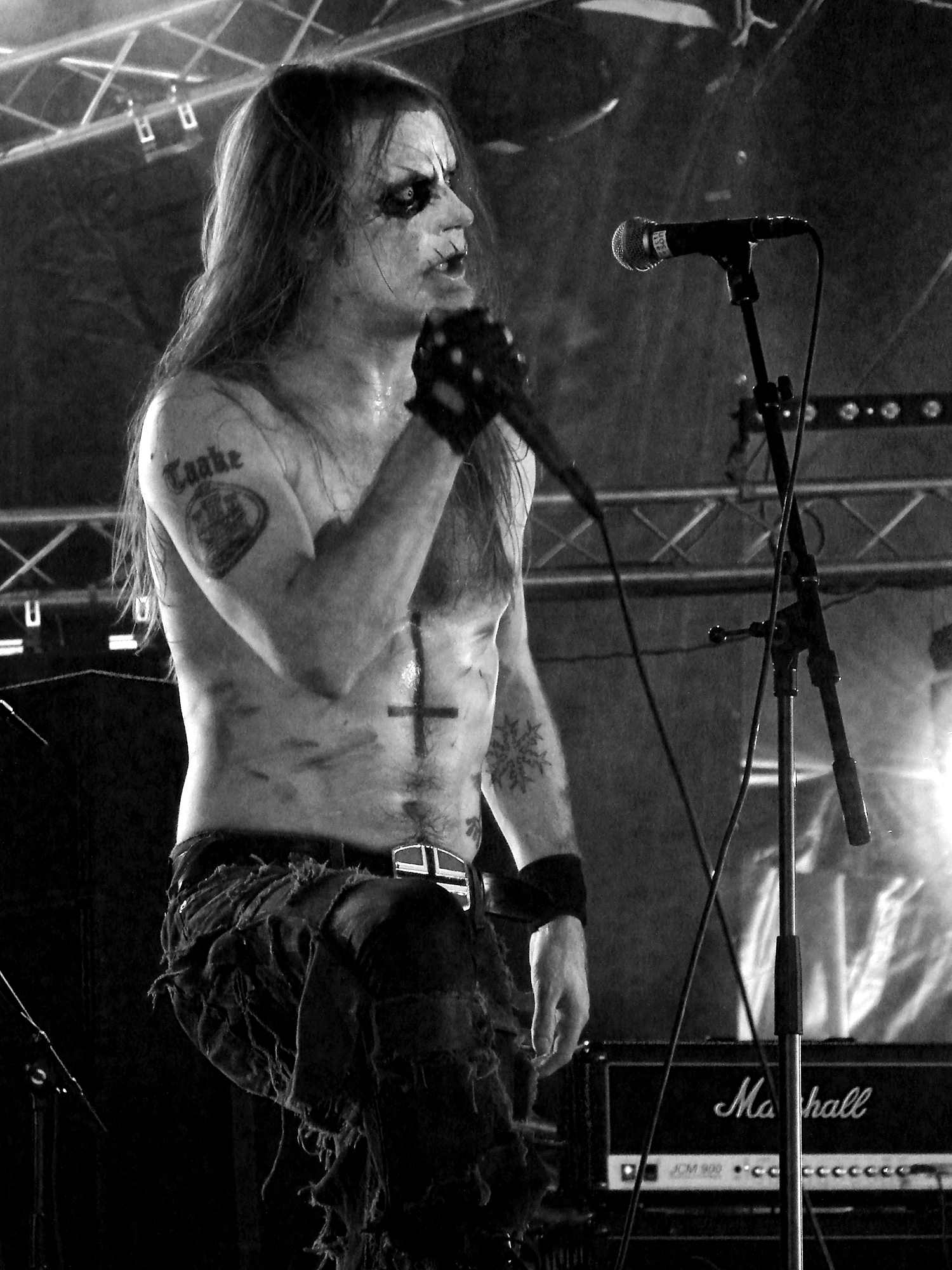
Hoest at Hellfest 2009

Hoest served prison sentences for assault in 2006 and 2007. In March 2007, Hoest appeared on stage in Essen in Germany with a swastika painted on his chest, above an inverted cross. This sparked controversy, and the rest of Taake's German concerts were cancelled. Hoest stated:

Taake is not a political Nazi band [...] everyone should know by now that our whole concept is built upon provocation and anything evil [...] we truly apologize to all of our collaborators who might get problems because of the Essen swastika scandal (except for the untermensch owner of that club; you can go suck a Muslim!)

Hoest explained that he "was taking the piss" and had used the swastika "as another symbol for evil", saying "the pentagram and inverted cross don't invoke reactions anymore". He said "It was all about doing something extreme for the sake of it, which certainly backfired", and also called it a spontaneous joke done in the spirit of punk. Music writer Stuart Wain likened Hoest's stunt to how the Sex Pistols and Siouxsie Sioux wore swastikas for shock value. In January 2008, Hoest wrote:

It is rather unforgivable to display a swastika in Germany, yes. On the other hand I strongly feel that Black Metal bands should allow themselves to use any kind of destructive/negative symbolism, as the basis of this expression is above all: Evil! Black Metal is still not, and should never become, harmless like all other styles of housebroke metal. Frankly, I find it preposterous that we get away with lyrics about murder, torture, rape, necrophilia and suicide, but get boycotted for wearing a symbol (which, by the way, has nothing to do with the band's concept) on one single occasion. A part of our mission is to invoke negative feelings, so I found it quite appropriate to remind our German audience of their biggest shame.

Hoest later said that he had made amends with the club's owner and shook his hand after playing at the venue with another band.

Taake's lyrics are often anti-Christian, but their nomination for the 2012 Spellemann award was criticized for an anti-Islamic lyric in their song "Orkan". It includes the line "Til Helvete med Muhammed og Muhammedanerne utilgivelige skikker" ("To hell with Muhammad and the Muhammadans' unforgivable customs"). Hoest noted that Christianity is mentioned in the same song, adding "Taake has never been a political band, and we do not encourage either violence or racism". The chairman of the prize committee said "We enjoy full freedom of expression in Norway and a Spellemann jury is not going to censor content". Hoest explained that "Black metal has always pushed religion around and I see no reason why Islam should be spared".

Taake were forced to cancel their planned 2018 US tour after Antifa activists campaigned to stop it, due to the past controversies. Many venues cancelled the shows after being contacted and threatened by Antifa groups, and support act King Dude pulled out. Hoest replied that "Taake is not a racist band. Never has been, never will be". He said the incident showed how "a small minority ... were able to force their agenda on the majority" through "lies, misinformation" and "threats of violence". In 2023, Taake were forced to cancel a planned tour of Australia due to complaints from a student association.

== Discography ==
Studio albums

- Nattestid (Night-time) (1999)
- Bjoergvin (Bergen) (2002)
- Doedskvad (Death poems) (2005)
- Taake (2008)
- Noregs vaapen (Norway's weapon) (2011)
- Stridens hus (House of strife) (2014)
- Kong Vinter (King Winter) (2017)
- Et hav av avstand (A Sea of Distance) (2023)
- En skog av nidstang (A forest of nithing poles) (2026)

Studio EPs

- Nekro (2007)
- Kveld (Evening) (2011)
- Kulde (Cold) (2014)
- Baktanker (Ulterior motives) (2017)

Live EPs

- Svartekunst (Dark arts) (2008)

Demos

- Der vinterstormene raste (Where the winter storms raged) (1993) – released as Thule
- Omfavnet av svarte vinger (Embraced by black wings) (1994) – released as Thule
- Manndaudsvinter (Dead man's winter) (1995)
- Koldbrann i jesu marg (Gangrene in Jesus' core) (1996)

Compilation albums

- Helnorsk svartmetall (All-Norwegian black metal) (2005) – compilation of early demos
- The Box (2005) – compilation containing Nattestid, Bjoergvin and Helnorsk Svartmetall
- Gravkamre, Kroner og Troner (Burial Chambers, Crowns and Thrones) (2013) – compilation with alternative versions of songs, demos and previously unreleased material
- 7 Fjell (7 Mountains) (2017) – compilation containing the first 7 full-length albums.
- Avvik (Deviation) (2021) – compilation of the band's songs from the last three split albums plus an acoustic version of Nattestid ser porten vid I

Split releases

- Sadistic Attack / Nordens doedsengel (2004) – split EP with Amok
- A Norwegian Hail to Von (2006) – split with Norwegian Evil, Amok and Urgehal
- Men of Eight / Lagnonector (2006) – split single with Vidsyn
- Dra Til Helvete! (2006) – split EP with Gigantomachy
- Swine of Hades (2011) – split EP with Sigh, The Meads of Asphodel, Thus Defiled and Evo/Algy
- Pakt (2020) – split EP with Whoredom Rife
- Jaertegn (2020) – split EP with Deathcult
- Henholdsvis (2021) – split EP with Helheim

== Personnel ==
=== Current members ===
- Hoest – composer, all instruments, vocals (1993–present)

=== Live members ===
- V'gandr – bass (2007–present)
- Aindiachaí – guitar (2007–present)
- Gjermund – guitar (2007–present)
- Rune – drums (2019–present)

=== Past members ===
- Svartulv – drums (1993–1996), vocals (2004, 2005)
- Dim (a.k.a. O.D.Smau) – vocals (1995)
- C. Corax – guitars (2004–2006)
- Keridwen – bass, piano (2000–2003; died 2015)
- Mord – drums (2002–2006)
- Lava – bass (2002–2007)
- Haavard – bass (unknown time period)

=== Guest musicians/past live members ===
- Thurzur – drums
- Skagg - guitar
- C. Corax – guitar
- Taipan – vocals
- Nattefrost – vocals
- Nordavind – vocals
- Discomforter – vocals
- Utflod – piano
- Støver – "whispers"
- John Boyle – war cry
- Ivar Bjørnson – guitar
- Nocturno Culto – vocals
- Attila Csihar – vocals
- Demonaz Doom Occulta – vocals
- Skagg – vocals
- Bjørnar E. Nilsen – vocals, mellotron
- Gjermund – guitar solos, banjo, mandolin
- Niklas Kvarforth – vocals
- Ciekals – additional guitar
