= Abattoir (disambiguation) =

Abattoir refers to a slaughterhouse.

Abattoir may also refer to:

- Abattoir (band), an American speed metal band
- Abattoir (comics), a fictional character in the DC Comics universe
- "Abattoir", song by Gehenna from WW
- "Abattoir" (X Marks the Pedwalk song), a single by X Marks the Pedwalk
- Abattoir (film), a horror film directed by Darren Lynn Bousman
