= Myr (disambiguation) =

A myr is a unit of time, one million years, used in astronomy, geology and biology.

Myr or MYR may also refer to:

- Munichi language (ISO 639 language code: myr)
- Malaysian ringgit, currency of Malaysia by ISO 4217 currency code
- Myrtle Beach International Airport (IATA airport code: MYR; ICAO airport code: KMYR), South Carolina, USA
- "Myr", a 2011 song by Taake off the album Noregs vaapen

== See also ==
- Myrrh
- Mir (disambiguation)
