= Strange Old Brew =

Studio album by Carpathian Forest
- Released: 6 November 2000
- Recorded: Sound Suite Studios
- Genre: Black metal
- Length: 37:11
- Label: Avantgarde
- Producers: Carpathian Forest, Terje Refsnes

Carpathian Forest chronology
Black Shining Leather (1998)	Strange Old Brew (2000)	Morbid Fascination of Death (2001)

Professional ratings
Review scores
Source	Rating
AllMusic	3/5 stars

Strange Old Brew is the second studio album by Norwegian black metal band Carpathian Forest. It was released on 6 November 2000 through Avantgarde Music. It was re-released under digipak format in 2007 by Peaceville Records, containing an extra track. Contrasting with the previous Carpathian Forest releases, the sonority of Strange Old Brew is their most experimental one so far, mixing black metal with jazz interludes. It was their first release with Anders Kobro and Tchort in the band's line-up.

The track "Theme from Nekromantikk" (sic) is a cover of the opening theme of the controversial 1987 horror movie Nekromantik, directed by Jörg Buttgereit.

The track "Return of the Freezing Winds" is one of the first tracks of Carpathian Forest's repertoire, being present already in their first demo tapes, Rehearsal Outtake and Bloodlust and Perversion.

== Track listing ==
All tracks are written by Nattefrost and Nordavind unless noted.

No.	Title	Length
1.	"Damnation Chant" (instrumental)	1:01
2.	"Bloodcleansing"	2:43
3.	"Mask of the Slave"	4:12
4.	"Martyr/Sacrificulum"	3:26
5.	"Thanatology"	4:40
6.	"The Suicide Song"	3:40
7.	"House of the Whipcord"	3:58
8.	"Cloak of Midnight"	5:28
9.	"Return of the Freezing Winds"	3:07
10.	"Theme from Nekromantikk" (instrumental; music composed by Hermann Kopp)	3:04
11.	"The Good Old Enema Treatment" (instrumental)	1:53

Peaceville Records 2007 digipak re-issue bonus track
No.	Title	Length
12.	"He's Turning Blue"	2:53

== Personnel ==
Carpathian Forest

- Roger Rasmussen (Nattefrost) — vocals, guitars, keyboards
- Johnny Krøvel (Nordavind) — vocals, guitars, keyboards
- Anders Kobro — drums, percussion
- Terje Vik Schei (Tchort) — bass

Additional musicians

- Nina Hex — female backing vocals on "House of the Whipcord" and "Cloak of Midnight"
- Eivind Kulde — backing vocals on "Bloodcleansing" and "Return of the Freezing Winds"
- Arvid Thorsen (Mötorsen) — tenor saxophone on "House of the Whipcord"

Miscellaneous staff

- E. Øvestad — artwork (logo)
- Nordavind — photography
- Daniel Vrangsinn — artwork, design
- Terje Refsnes — production, mixing
