= Et hav av avstand =

Studio album by Taake
- Released: 1 September 2023
- Recorded: 2022
- Studios: Conclave & Earshot Studios
- Genre: Black metal
- Length: 42:14
- Label: Dark Essence Records
- Producer: Bjørnar E. Nilsen

Taake chronology
Kong Vinter (2017)	Et hav av avstand (2023)	En skog av nidstang (2026)

Et hav av avstand is the eight full-length album by Norwegian black metal band Taake. It was released on 1 September 2023 and is the band's first studio album in six years.

== Recording and release ==
In 2022, Hoest entered Conclave Studio along with long-time producer Bjørnar Erevik Nilsen and recorded nearly 20 tracks for future Taake releases. In spring 2023, the album Et hav av Avstand was announced for a release in autumn of that year. Coinciding with the Beyond the Gates festival in Bergen, a listening party for the album with Hoest was held for fans at the Hellion bar on 3 August 2023. Et hav av Avstand was released on 1 September 2023 to good reviews from Norwegian and international critics.

== Track listing ==
All tracks are written by Hoest.

No.	Title	Length
1.	"Denne forblaaste ruin av en bro"	11:52
2.	"Utarmede gruver"	11:06
3.	"Gid sprakk vi"	6:14
4.	"Et uhyre av en kniv"	13:02
Total length:		42:14

== Personnel ==
=== Taake ===
- Hoest – vocals, instruments

=== Additional personnel ===
- Bjørnar E. Nilsen – producer, mixer
- Herbrand Larsen – mastering
- H'Grimnir – artwork
- Csaba Bende – photography
