= Stridens hus =

Studio album by Taake
- Released: 8 December 2014
- Studio: Conclave and Earshot Studios, Bergen
- Genre: Black metal
- Length: 43:34
- Label: Dark Essence Records
- Producer: Bjoernar E. Nilsen

Taake chronology
Noregs vaapen (2011)	Stridens hus (2014)	Kong Vinter (2017)

Stridens hus is the sixth full-length album by Norwegian black metal band Taake. It was released on 8 December 2014.

The album was rated a 10 out of 10 by Metal Temple.

== Track listing ==
All tracks are written by Hoest.

No.	Title	Length
1.	"Gamle Norig"	5:54
2.	"Orm"	6:43
3.	"Det fins en prins"	8:07
4.	"Stank"	6:20
5.	"En sang til sand om ildebrann"	5:06
6.	"Kongsgaard bestaar"	5:35
7.	"Vinger"	5:49
Total length:		43:34

== Personnel ==
=== Taake ===
- Hoest – vocals, all other instruments

=== Additional personnel ===
- Herbrand Larsen – mastering
- Bjoernar E. Nilsen – producer, recording, mixing
- Nekrographie – artwork, photography
