= Kong vinter =

Kong Vinter

Studio album by Taake
- Released: 24 November 2017
- Studio: Conclave & Earshot Studios
- Genre: Black metal
- Length: 50:57
- Label: Dark Essence Records
- Producer: Bjoernar Erevik Nilsen

Taake chronology
Stridens hus (2014)	Kong Vinter (2017)	Et hav av avstand (2023)

Kong Vinter is the seventh full-length album by Norwegian black metal band Taake. It was released on 24 November 2017.

== Recording and reception ==
Kong Vinter is Taake's first album in three years, since Stridens hus. It was produced by long-time collaborator Bjoernar Erevik Nilsen and recorded at Conclave Studio in Bergen. The album was received well by Norwegian and international critics. Metal Hammer notably praised Hoest and Taake's longevity:

With Gorgoroth now past their prime, Abbath practising his Diamond Dave pose and Enslaved going prog, Taake – or should we say their overlord and sole performer in the studio, Hoest – pretty much remains the last band standing in their native Bergen, seven albums in.

— Olivier Badin, Metal Hammer

== Track listing ==
All tracks are written by Hoest.

No.	Title	Length
1.	"Sverdets vei"	4:14
2.	"Inntrenger"	7:18
3.	"Huset i havet"	7:12
4.	"Havet i huset"	7:35
5.	"Jernhaand"	6:18
6.	"Maanebrent"	8:00
7.	"Fra bjoergegrend mot glemselen"	10:21
Total length:		50:57

== Personnel ==
=== Taake ===
- Hoest – vocals, guitars, bass, drums

=== Additional personnel ===
- Bjoernar Erevik Nilsen – producer, recording engineer, mixer
- Herbrand Larsen – mastering
- H'Grimnir – artwork
- Brodd – photography
