= Black Seared Heart =

Compilation album by Gehenna
- Released: 1997
- Recorded: Soundsuite Studios (tracks 1–7), June 1993
- Genre: Black metal
- Length: 32:27
- Label: Holycaust Records
- Producer: Gehenna

Gehenna chronology
Malice (Our Third Spell) (1996)	Black Seared Heart (1997)	Adimiron Black (1998)

Black Seared Heart is compilation of very early recordings by the Norwegian black metal band Gehenna.

Tracks 1–7 are labeled "Pact I" and originally appeared on Gehenna's 1993 demo, Black Seared Heart. It was released on a cassette, limited to 100 copies. They were recorded in June, 1993.

Tracks 8 & 9 are labeled "Pact II". These songs were recorded in January, 1994 for an album which was never completed, the two included on this compilation ("A Witch is Born" & "Night of the Serpent's Judgment") were re-mixed on an old portable four-track home recorder with the addition of Sarcana's keyboard parts as the original versions only contained guitar, bass and drum tracks. Both of these tracks would later be re-recorded with a much different sound and released on "Seen Through the Veils of Darkness (The Second Spell)".

Track 10 is labeled "Pact III." This track is from an old rehearsal cassette that was recorded even before the demo.

== Track listing ==
1. "Intro" - 0:48
2. "Two Demons Eight Spirits" - 2:33
3. "Black Seared Heart" - 3:46
4. "Angelwings and Ravenclaws" - 2:44
5. "The Chariots that Carried Her to the Grave" - 5:32
6. "Outro" - 2:33
7. "Outro II" - 0:40
8. "A Witch Is Born" - 5:37
9. "Night of the Serpent's Judgement" - 4:46
10. "Midwinter Forest" - 3:23

== Credits ==
- Sanrabb - Lead Guitar, Vocals
- Dolgar - Rhythm Guitar, Vocals
- Sir Vereda - Bass
- Sarcana - Keyboards
- Dirge Rep - Drums
