= First Spell =

EP by Gehenna
- Released: 1994
- Recorded: Soundsuite Studios, 3–7 June 1994
- Genre: Black metal
- Length: 26:34
- Label: Head Not Found
- Producer: Terje Refsnes

Gehenna chronology
Ancestor of the Darkly Sky (1993)	First Spell (1994)	Seen Through the Veils of Darkness (The Second Spell) (1995)

First Spell is the second EP by the Norwegian black metal band Gehenna. A vinyl LP version, limited to 500 copies, was released in 1995 by Damnation Records. A cassette version was released by Isengard Distribution in 1994.

== Track listing ==
No.	Title	Length
1.	"The Shivering Voice of the Ghost"	06:05
2.	"Unearthly Loose Palace"	05:44
3.	"Angelwings and Ravenclaws"	02:41
4.	"The Conquering of Hirsir"	06:07
5.	"Morningstar"	05:57
Total length:		26:34

2008 Indie Recordings re-release bonus tracks
No.	Title	Length
6.	"Midwinter Forest"	03:22
7.	"A Witch Is Born"	05:36
8.	"Night of the Serpent's Judgement"	04:42
9.	"Intro"	00:46
10.	"Two Demons Eight Spirits"	02:30
11.	"Black Seared Heart"	03:43
12.	"Angelwings and Ravenclaws"	02:41
13.	"The Chariots That Carried Her to the Grave"	05:30
14.	"Outro I & II"	03:13
Total length:		58:37

== Personnel ==
- Dolgar - vocals
- Sarcana - keyboards
- Dirge Rep - drums
- Svartalv - bass
- Sanrabb - guitars

=== Production ===
- Stamos Koliousis - remastering
- Mori - photography
- Beastus - photography
- T. Refsnes - engineering
- Evangelos Labrakis - remastering
