= Over Bjoergvin graater himmerik =

Studio album by Taake
- Released: 25 March 2002
- Recorded: Recorded in Grieghallen, between 2000–2001
- Genre: Black metal
- Length: 39:05
- Label: Wounded Love Records

Taake chronology
Nattestid Ser Porten Vid (1999)	Over Bjoergvin graater himmerik (2002)	Hordalands doedskvad (2005)

Over Bjoergvin graater himmerik (English: Heaven cries over Bergen), appears on the album cover as ...Bjoergvin..., is the second full-length album by Norwegian black metal band Taake. It was released on 1 January 2002.

In 2013, Decibel ranked Over Bjoergvin graater himmerik at number 60 on its list of the Top 100 Black Metal Albums of All Time.

== Track listing ==
All tracks are written by Hoest.

No.	Title	Length
1.	"Over Bjoergvin graater himmerik I"	4:52
2.	"Over Bjoergvin graater himmerik II"	6:41
3.	"Over Bjoergvin graater himmerik III"	6:12
4.	"Over Bjoergvin graater himmerik IV"	6:31
5.	"Over Bjoergvin graater himmerik V"	6:23
6.	"Over Bjoergvin graater himmerik VI"	4:02
7.	"Over Bjoergvin graater himmerik VII (instrumental)"	4:24

== Personnel ==
=== Taake ===
- Hoest – vocals, guitars
- C. Corax – guitars
- Keridwen – bass, piano

=== Additional personnel ===
- Mutt – drums
- Pytten – recording engineer
- Herbrand – recording engineer
- Davide – recording engineer
- Sgit – photography
