= Nattestid ser porten vid =

Studio album by Taake
- Released: 7 January 1999
- Recorded: 1997–1998, Grieghallen Studios
- Genre: Black metal
- Length: 42:17
- Label: Wounded Love Records
- Producer: Pytten

Taake chronology
| Nattestid ser porten vid (1999) | Over Bjoergvin graater himmerik (2002) |

Nattestid ser porten vid (English: Nighttime Sees the Gate Wide), appears on the album cover as Nattestid..., is the first full-length album released by Norwegian black metal band Taake. It was released by Wounded Love Records in 1999. The album was written entirely by Hoest, but he brought in a session musician, Tundra, to perform bass and drums. It was recorded throughout 1997 and 1998 at Grieghallen. Nattestid is the first part in a trilogy of albums. All the writing on the CD and lyrics in the booklet are written in runes. The album's lyrics are sung in Norwegian.

== Track listing ==
All tracks are written by Hoest.

| No. | Title | Length |
|---|---|---|
| 1. | "Nattestid ser porten vid I" | 5:55 |
| 2. | "Nattestid ser porten vid II" | 5:34 |
| 3. | "Nattestid ser porten vid III" | 4:31 |
| 4. | "Nattestid ser porten vid IV (instrumental)" | 4:35 |
| 5. | "Nattestid ser porten vid V" | 4:10 |
| 6. | "Nattestid ser porten vid VI" | 7:33 |
| 7. | "Nattestid ser porten vid VII" | 9:37 |

== Personnel ==
=== Taake ===
- Hoest – vocals, guitars, arrangements
- Frostein Tundra Arctander – bass, drums, choirs, arrangements

=== Additional personnel ===
- Pytten – producer
