= Blood and Vomit =

Studio album by Nattefrost
- Released: 18 February 2004
- Recorded: 2004
- Genre: Black metal
- Length: 39:55
- Label: Season of Mist
- Producer: Vrangsinn, Nattefrost

Nattefrost chronology
Blood and Vomit (2004)	Terrorist (2005)

Professional ratings
Review scores
Source	Rating
AllMusic	3.5/5 stars

Blood and Vomit is the debut solo album by Norwegian black metal artist Nattefrost, released on 18 February 2004, by Seasons of Mist.

== Track listing ==
1. "Ancient Devil Worshipping" - 4:00
2. "Sluts of Hell" - 3:07
3. "Satanic Victory" - 1:02
4. "Universal Funeral" - 2:41
5. "The Art of Spiritual Purification" - 5:56
6. "Sanctum 666" - 4:10
7. "Whore (Filthy Whore)" - 4:47
8. "Mass Destruction" - 3:03
9. "Nattefrost Takes a Piss" - 0:26
10. "The Gate of Nanna (Beherit cover)" - 4:42
11. "Still Reaching for Hell" - 6:01

== Credits ==
- Roger Nattefrost - all instruments
