= Hordalands doedskvad =

Album by Taake

Studio album by Taake
- Released: 28 February 2005
- Recorded: Grieghallen, 2004; Zeitgeist Studio (guest vocals on track 1)
- Genre: Black metal
- Length: 50:37
- Label: Dark Essence Records
- Producer: Pytten; Steigen

Taake chronology
Over Bjoergvin graater himmerik (2002)	Hordalands doedskvad (2005)	Taake (2008)

Hordalands doedskvad (English: Death poems of Hordaland), appears on the album cover as ...Doedskvad, is the third full-length album by Norwegian black metal band Taake. It was released on 28 February 2005.

The album was rated a five out of five by The Metal Crypt.

== Track listing ==
All tracks are written by Hoest.

No.	Title	Length
1.	"Hordalands doedskvad I"	7:43
2.	"Hordalands doedskvad II"	6:02
3.	"Hordalands doedskvad III"	6:16
4.	"Hordalands doedskvad IV"	8:16
5.	"Hordalands doedskvad V"	6:03
6.	"Hordalands doedskvad VI (instrumental)"	7:17
7.	"Hordalands doedskvad VII"	9:00

== Personnel ==
=== Taake ===
- Doedsjarl Hoest – vocals, guitars
- C. Corax – guitars
- Mord – drums
- Radek Nemec – bass, vocals (track 2 and 7), guitars (track 1 and 7)

=== Additional personnel ===
- Utflod – piano & album cover photography
- Steigen – vocals (falsetto) (track 7)
- Stoever – whispering voice (track 2)
- J. Nordavind – vocals (track 1)
- Helveteskommandant Nattefrost – vocals (track 1)
- Taipan – vocals (track 3 and 7)
- Discomforter – vocals (track 2)
- Steigen – producer
- Pytten – producer
