= Vrangsinn =

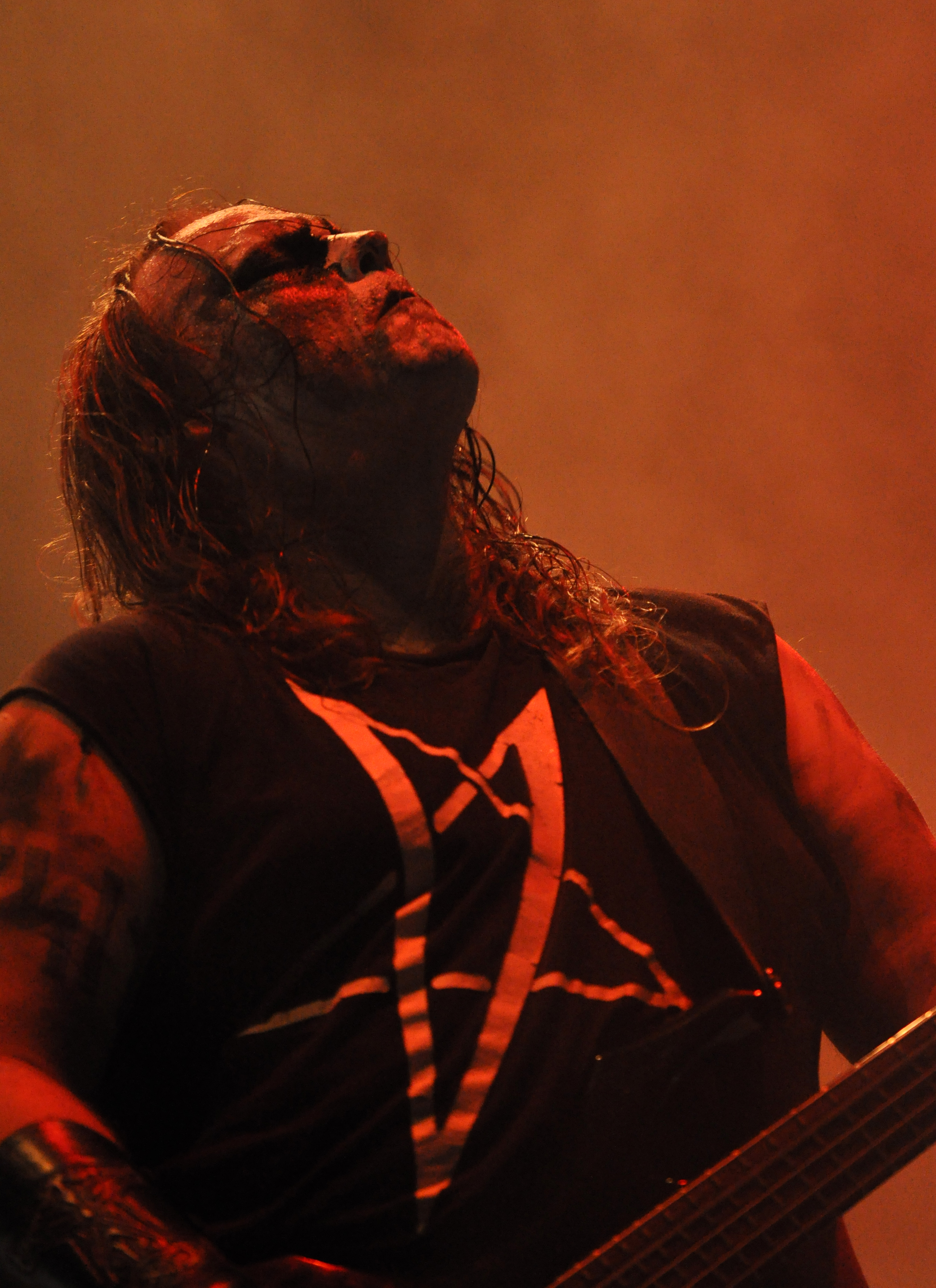
- Vrangsinn in 2013

Background information
- Born: Daniel Salte; 29 January 1974 (age 52); Stavanger, Norway
- Genre: Black metal
- Occupations: Musician, songwriter, record producer, sound engineer, graphic artist
- Instruments: Vocals, guitar, bass guitar, drums, keyboards
- Years active: 1990–present
- Label: Misantrof ANTIRecords
- Member of: Carpathian Forest
- Website: http://www.vrangsinn.no/

Daniel Salte (born 29 January 1974), better known by his stage name Vrangsinn, is a Norwegian musician, poet, painter and graphic artist, best known as the bassist of black metal band Carpathian Forest (1999–2014; 2019–present).

== Biography ==
Vrangsinn joined Norwegian black metal band Carpathian Forest in 1999. He departed the band in 2014, before rejoining in 2019. Vrangsinn is known for his bizarre stage stunts while performing live with Carpathian Forest. In addition to his musical career, he is an active poet, painter, and has created art in other forms such as concrete art, jewelry, steel crosses and pentagrams. His poetry is often critical of religion and dogma.

In 2007, Vrangsinn founded the non-profit record label Misantrof ANTIRecords, through which he releases music by his solo project and other bands freely to the general public with a creative commons license.

Vrangsinn believes art should belong to humanity as a whole and that everyone should have equal rights to access and share the art.

== Discography ==
=== With Carpathian Forest ===
- Strange Old Brew 1999 (Cover Artwork and work on The Good Old Enema Treatment)
- Morbid Fascination of Death (2001)
- Defending the Throne of Evil (2003)
- Skjend Hans Lik compilation (2004)
- We're Going to Hell for This – over a decade of perversions (2004)
- We're Going to Hollywood for This – Live perversions DVD (2004)
- Fuck You All!!!! (2006)

=== With Vrangsinn ===
- Moon Psychedelia Collection (2008)
- PHOBIA (Multimedia release on DVD/CD/MP3/MP4) (2010)

=== With Nattefrost ===
- Blood & Vomit (2004) Vrangsinn produced, mixed and mastered & performed backup vocals on tracks 1, 2 and 8 and bass guitar on track 3.
- Terrorist (2005) Vrangsinn produced, mixed and mastered & performed bass guitar, lead guitar, and vocals on tracks 1, 4, 5, 7, 8, 12
- Det beste til meg og mine venner. En hyllest til Joachim Nielsen Uskyldighet (2006) Vrangsinn produced, mixed and mastered this song & Play bass
- Red Planet / Nattefrost split - Engangsgrill Vrangsinn produced, mixed and mastered the Nattefrost part of this album and mastered the Red Planet part

=== With A Waste of Talent ===
This band releases all their music on Misantrof ANTIRecords. Their releases are free for the public to download.

A Waste of Talent was founded in 1992 but waited until 2008 to release one full-length album named Psycodelic Steamtrain. Since then they have been working on a follow-up titled "The last remains of humankind" Release date or progress on this project is unknown.

A Waste of Talent play a musical style self-titled to be: "GroovyDepressive PopRockMetal with a lot of Doom!" The complete name of this band is "A Waste of Talent a.k.a. Psycodelic Steamtrain". The music was recorded in Misantrof Studio. Engineered, mixed and mastered by Vrangsinn.

=== With Eirik Skrangle ===
- Dagen Derpå E.P (2006)

Vrangsinn plays guitar and bass, and he does backing vocals. The music has been classified as True Norwegian PunkFolkRock!!! By Misantrof ANTIRecords.

Recorded in Misantrof Studio. Produced, Engineered, mixed and mastered by Vrangsinn.

=== With Tsjuder ===
- "Norwegian Apocalypse" DVD (2006) – Vrangsinn play bass on Sacrifice – Bathory cover. Vrangsinn recorded, mixed and mastered the bonus video material at Tribute – Sandnes

=== With Secht ===
- Secht (2006) performed acoustic and electric guitars, bass, vocal, harp, pump organ, production, engineering, mixing, Mastering and sounds on their debut album.

=== With Hatepulse ===
- In Extenso Letalis (E.P – 2003)
- The Core of the Soulless (Full length – 2007)

=== With Neetzach ===
- Pinseltronen 96 re-mastered Demo (2005)
- True Servants of Satan Full length (2006)

=== With The No No No's ===
Various recordings done by Vranginn & Nattefrost 1996–2001.

== Miscellaneous recordings with Vrangsinn ==
=== With The Horror Vault (Movie music) ===
- HELVETE Vrangsinn is listed as compozer Additional music on this feature horror film from 2008

=== With Bleed with me (Movie music) ===
- Vrangsinn is listed as composer on this feature horror film from 2009

=== With Bleedthrough – The making of Bleed with me (Movie music) ===
- Vrangsinn is listed as composer on this making of from 2009

=== With The Horror Vault 3 (Movie music) ===
- A Waste of Talent - Machines kept pumping blood from earth Vrangsinn is listed as composer of music on this feature horror film from 2010

=== With Beyond the morninglight ===
- Beyond the morninglight album (2008) Engineered, mixed and mastered by Vrangsinn

=== With Dingir Xul ===
- Cthulhu Arise Demo (2003) Engineered, mixed and mastered by Vrangsinn
- Corpse Abuse Demo (2005) Engineered, mixed and mastered by Vrangsinn

=== With Deathcult ===
- Cult of the Dragon Full length (2007) Engineered, mixed and mastered by Vrangsinn

=== With Duckwalk Chuck ===
- Comin out blastng Full length (2004) Engineered, mixed and mastered by Vrangsinn

=== With Upskirts ===
- Sidewalk Susie Demo (2005) Engineered, mixed and mastered by Vrangsinn

=== With Orcustus ===
- Wrathrash EP (2005) – Some recording & mixing
- Orcustus Full length (2009) Engineered, mixed and mastered by Vrangsinn

=== With World Destroyer ===
- Diabolical Journey 14-track demo from 1999 featuring Vrangsinn, Nattefrost and Kulde.

Engineered, mixed and mastered by Vrangsinn and Nattefrost
