= Defending the Throne of Evil =

Studio album by Carpathian Forest
- Released: 23 September 2003
- Recorded: Sound Suite Studio, August–September 2002
- Genre: Symphonic black metal
- Length: 51:22
- Label: Season of Mist
- Producers: Carpathian Forest and Terje Refsnes

Carpathian Forest chronology
We're Going to Hell for This: Over a Decade of Perversions (2002)	Defending the Throne of Evil (2003)	Skjend hans lik (2004)

Professional ratings
Review scores
Source	Rating
Allmusic	2.5/5 stars

Defending the Throne of Evil is the fourth studio album by the Norwegian black metal band Carpathian Forest. It was released on 23 September 2003 by Season of Mist. A remastered, deluxe double LP version with a bonus track was also released in 2007.

== Track listing ==
All tracks are written by Nattefrost unless noted.

No.	Title	Length
1.	"It's Darker Than You Think"	4:41
2.	"Skjend hans lik" (Norwegian for "Desecrate his body")	5:07
3.	"The Well of All Human Tears"	5:36
4.	"Put to Sleep Like a Sick Animal!!!"	4:52
5.	"Hymne til døden" (Norwegian for "Hymn to death")	3:51
6.	"Ancient Spirits of the Underworld"	4:35
7.	"Spill the Blood of the Lamb"	4:52
8.	"One with the Earth" (Eivind Kulde)	3:14
9.	"Christian Incoherent Drivel"	3:41
10.	"The Old House on the Hill"	2:51
11.	"Nekrophiliac/Anthropophagus Maniac"	4:12
12.	"Cold Murderous Music"	3:50

2007 double disc deluxe edition bonus track
No.	Title	Length
13.	"Humiliation Chant"	2:48

== Personnel ==
Carpathian Forest

- Roger Rasmussen (Nattefrost) — vocals, guitars
- Anders Kobro — drums, percussion
- Daniel Vrangsinn — guitars, bass, keyboards
- Terje Vik Schei (Tchort) — guitars

Session musicians

- Arvid Thorsen (Mötorsen) — tenor saxophone

Other staff

- Daniel Orstad — photography
- Terje Refsnes — engineering, production, sound effects, noises
- Nattefrost and Vrangsinn — production, cover art, artwork, graphics, photography
