= Black Shining Leather =

Studio album by Carpathian Forest
- Released: August 1998
- Recorded: February–May 1998
- Studio: Sound Suite and Endless Sound, Oslo, Norway
- Genre: Black metal
- Length: 50:45
- Label: Avantgarde
- Producer: Carpathian Forest and Terje Refsnes

Carpathian Forest chronology
Through Chasm, Caves and Titan Woods (1995)	Black Shining Leather (1998)	Strange Old Brew (2000)

Professional ratings
Review scores
Source	Rating
Chronicles of Chaos	10/10
Collector's Guide to Heavy Metal	7/10
Rock Hard	8.5/10

Black Shining Leather is the debut studio album by Norwegian black metal band Carpathian Forest. It was released in 1998 through Avantgarde Music, and re-issued in 2007 by Peaceville Records via digipak format.

It was their only release to feature Lazare on drums, who left the band in the following year and would later join Borknagar.

== Track listing ==
All tracks are written by Nattefrost and Nordavind, unless noted.

No.	Title	Length
1.	"Black Shining Leather"	4:32
2.	"The Swordsmen"	4:07
3.	"Death Triumphant"	4:27
4.	"Sadomasochistic"	4:02
5.	"Lupus" (instrumental)	3:06
6.	"Pierced Genitalia"	4:18
7.	"In Silence I Observe"	3:42
8.	"Lunar Nights"	6:34
9.	"Third Attempt"	3:18
10.	"The Northern Hemisphere"	6:42

Peaceville Records 2007 digipak re-issue bonus track
No.	Title	Writer(s)	Length
11.	"A Forest" (The Cure cover)	Lol Tolhurst, Matthieu Hartley, Robert Smith, Simon Gallup	5:57

== Personnel ==
Carpathian Forest

- Roger Rasmussen (Nattefrost) — lead vocals, lead guitar, keyboards
- Johnny Krøvel (Nordavind) — backing vocals, rhythm guitar, keyboards, bass guitar
- Lars Are Nedland (Lazare) — drums, percussion

Miscellaneous staff

- Terje Refsnes — producer, engineer
