= Carpathian Forest =

Norwegian black metal band

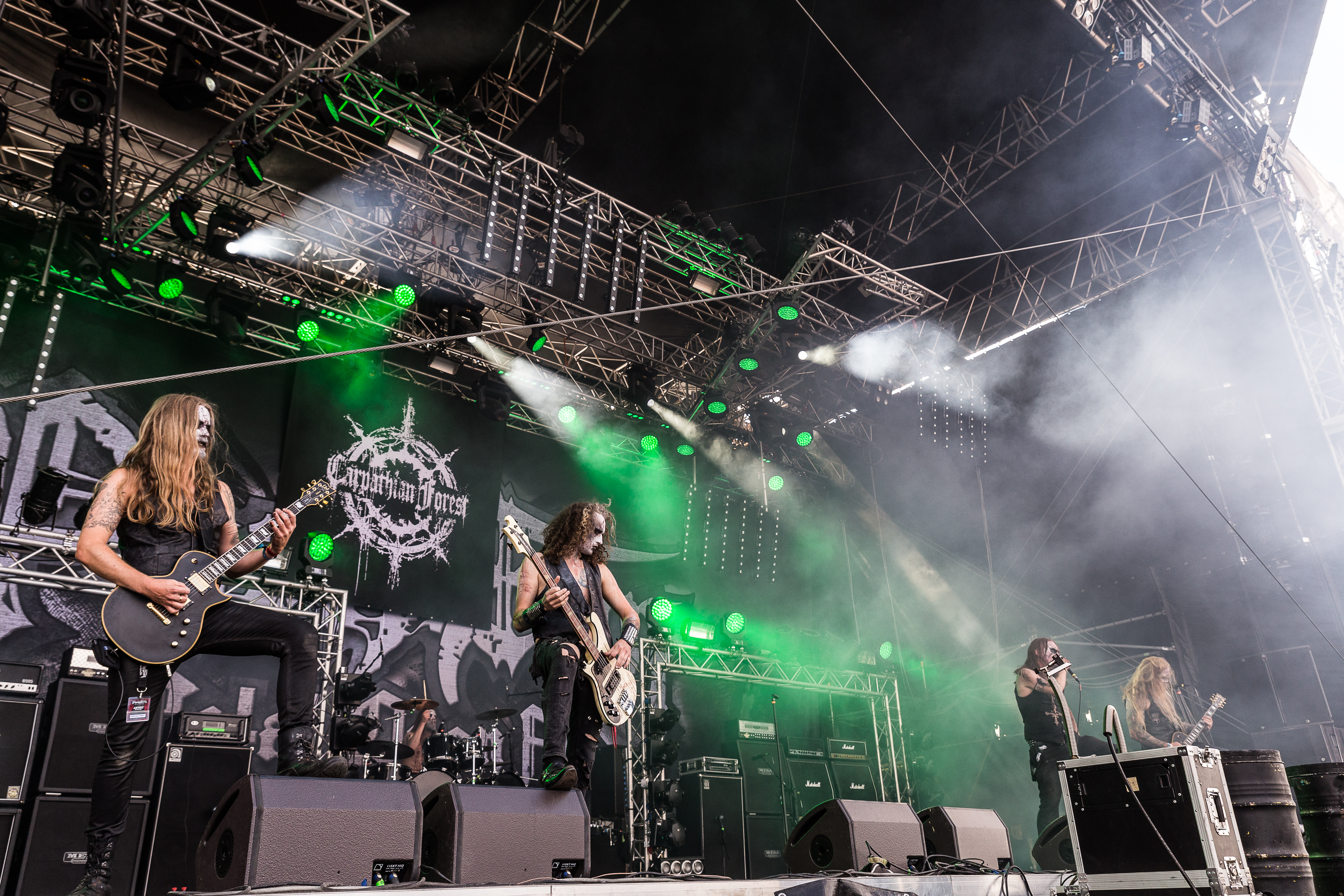
- Carpathian Forest in 2018

Background information
- Origin: Sandnes, Norway
- Genre: Black metal
- Years active: 1992–2014, 2017–present
- Labels: Avantgarde Music, Peaceville, Season of Mist
- Members: Nattefrost; Vrangsinn
- Past members: Nordavind; Lord Blackmangler; Damnatus; Lazare; Tchort; Blood Pervertor

Carpathian Forest is a Norwegian black metal band characterized by a raw and aggressive form of Norwegian black metal, combining early 1990s extreme metal with lyrics of decadence, nihilism, and morbidness. Their sound merges tremolo-driven guitar riffs, lo-fi production, and harsh, rasping vocals.

== History ==
In late 1990, the band started as Enthrone with Nattefrost (then known as Lord Nosferatu) and Nordavind (known as Lord Karnstein). They produced the self-released demo Black Winds in 1991.

In 1992, Enthrone changed its name to Carpathian Forest, and Lord Blackmangler and Damnatus joined their line-up. They self-released the demo tapes Rehearsal Outtake, Bloodlust and Perversion (both in 1992) and Journey Through the Cold Moors of Svarttjern (in 1993). Damnatus and Lord Blackmangler left afterwards. Carpathian Forest reverted to a duo.

Carpathian Forest released their first studio work in 1995, the extended play Through Chasm, Caves and Titan Woods, via Avantgarde Music. It was the first of many releases via Avantgarde.

In 1998, the band released their first full-length album, Black Shining Leather, via Avantgarde Music. It was their only release to feature drummer Lazare, who later joined Borknagar. That year, they played their first concert at the Under the Black Sun Festival in Schönermark, Germany.

Lazare left Carpathian Forest in 1999, the same year Anders Kobro, Tchort and Daniel Vrangsinn joined permanently. The following year, their second full-length, Strange Old Brew, was released. It was their most experimental album thus far. By the end of the year, they released the single "He's Turning Blue".

In 2001, founding member Nordavind left Carpathian Forest during the recording of their third studio album, Morbid Fascination of Death, which retained the experimentation of their previous release. In the following year, the compilation album We're Going to Hell for This: Over a Decade of Perversions was released to celebrate the band's 10th anniversary. It was their last album released by Avantgarde Music before they switched to Season of Mist.

Their fourth full-length, Defending the Throne of Evil, was released in 2003 by Season of Mist. It was more melodic than Carpathian Forest's previous releases, reminiscent of symphonic black metal. In late 2003, Gøran "Blood Pervertor" Bomann joined the band.

They released the live DVD We're Going to Hollywood for This in 2004, as well as a compilation album featuring rarities and reworked versions of old songs, Skjend hans lik (Norwegian for "Desecrate His Body").

Carpathian Forest's latest studio album was the 2006 release Fuck You All!!!! Caput tuum in ano est, a throwback to their blackened thrash metal debut.

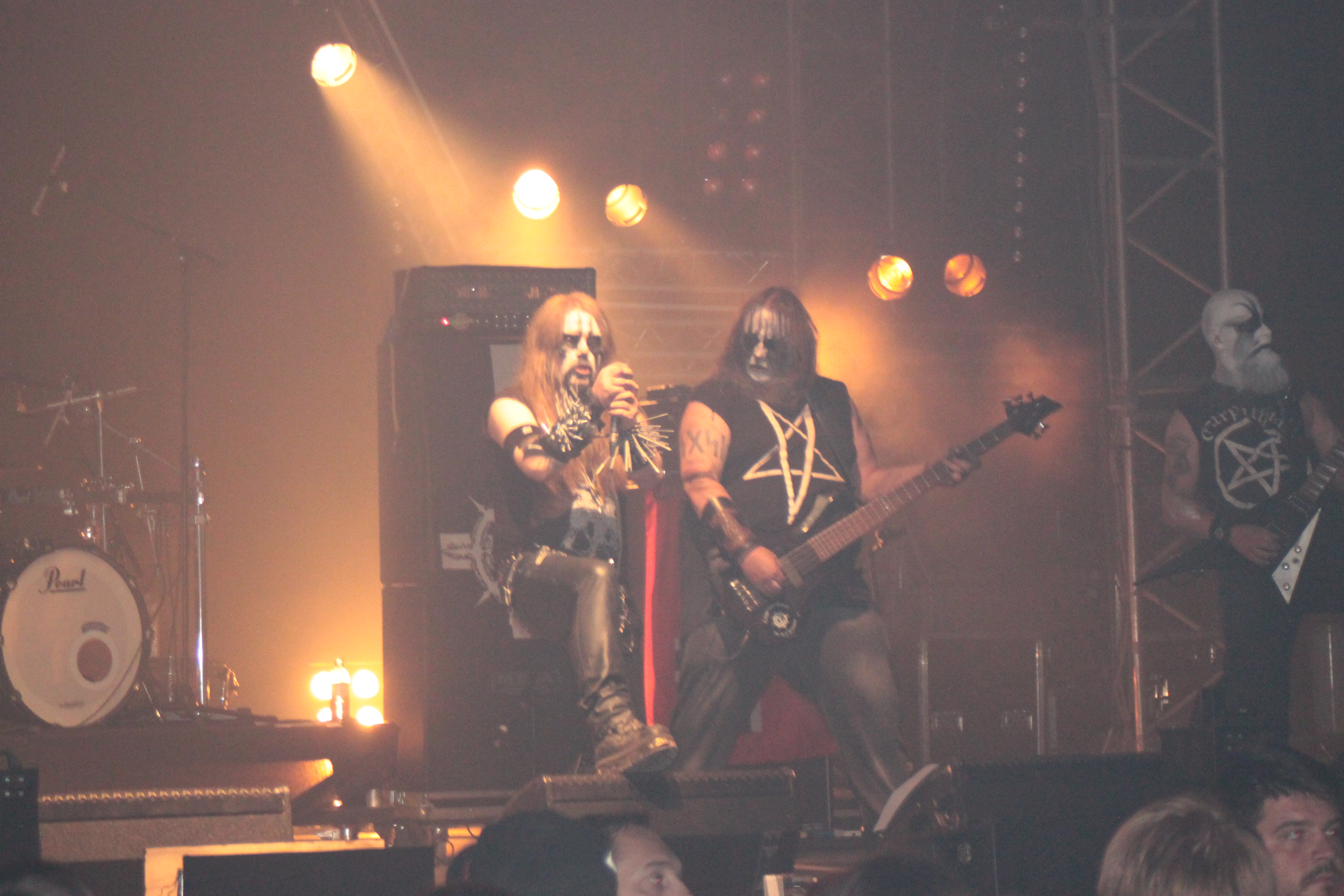
Carpathian Forest in 2013

In an early 2008 issue of Terrorizer, Tchort spoke about the possibility of a new album, and the rumors regarding a "half-finished album". He was quoted as saying, "I met with Nattefrost a few weeks ago and we decided to focus on a new album, but we haven't even started writing it yet. The news that we had an album half-finished was based on the fact that we had material left over from the last album. Since we record in different studios, this meant that I had the basics for music that Nattefrost never heard". He also divulged that "[we] kind of decided on a slightly new direction for the band, compared to Fuck You All, at least".

The band co-headlined the Inferno Festival in 2009, and confirmed rumors of a new album.

The band entered on a relative hiatus after 2009. From 2012 onwards, they played on some festivals around Europe. The band was scheduled to play on the Maryland Deathfest on 26 May 2013, but their show was cancelled due to last-minute visa problems. The band's last known concert was at Incineration Fest, in London England in May 2019.

In the band's concerts in 2013–2014, Jonathan Perez from Green Carnation (and former Sirenia and Trail Of Tears) played drums.

The band went on hiatus in July 2014, after Tchort and Blood Pervertor announced they had left Carpathian Forest and would form The 3rd Attempt.

In 2017, the band returned and announced that they were working on the album Likskue, to be released in 2018.

== Band members ==
Current

- Nattefrost (Roger Rasmussen) — vocals, all other instruments (1992–present)
- Vrangsinn (Daniel Salte) — bass (1999–2014, 2019–present)
- Malphas — guitars (2017–present)
- Erik Gamle — guitars (2017–present)
- Audun — drums (2017–present)

Former

- Nordavind (Johnny Krøvel) — bass, guitars, keyboards, backing vocals (1992–2001)
- Damnatus — bass (1992–1993)
- Lord Blackmangler — drums (1992–1993)
- Lazare (Lars Are Nedland) — drums, percussion (1998–1999)
- Anders Kobro — drums, percussion (1999–2014)
- Tchort (Terje Vik Schei) — bass, guitars (1999–2009, 2012–2014)
- Blood Pervertor (Gøran Bomann) — guitars, backing vocals (2003–2014)
- Slakt (Kjetil Dyvik Løksli) — bass (2017–2019)

Session

- Grimm — bass (1993)
- Svein H. Kleppe — drums, percussion (1995)
- John M. Harr — bass guitar, fretless bass (1995)
- Arvid Thorsen (Mötorsen) — tenor saxophone (2000–2003)
- Nina Hex — female backing vocals (2000–2001)

Live

- Jonathan Pérez — drums (2013–present)
- Hoest (Ørjan Stedjeberg) — vocals (2003)

== Discography ==
=== Studio albums ===
- Black Shining Leather (1998)
- Strange Old Brew (2000)
- Morbid Fascination of Death (2001)
- Defending the Throne of Evil (2003)
- Fuck You All!!!! Caput tuum in ano est (2006)

=== Extended plays ===
- Through Chasm, Caves and Titan Woods (1995)

=== Compilations ===
- Bloodlust and Perversion (1997)
- We're Going to Hell for This: Over a Decade of Perversions (2002)
- Skjend hans lik (2004)

=== Video releases ===
- We're Going to Hollywood for This: Live Perversions (2004)

=== Demo tapes ===
- Black Winds (1991 — as Enthrone)
- Rehearsal Outtake (1992)
- Bloodlust and Perversion (1992)
- Journey Through the Cold Moors of Svarttjern (1993)

=== Singles ===
- "He's Turning Blue" (2000)
- "Likeim" (2018)
