= Murder (album) =

Studio album by Gehenna
- Released: 2000
- Recorded: Mansion Studio & Klepptomedia Studio, December 1999 - February 2000
- Genre: Death metal
- Length: 31:40
- Label: Moonfog Productions
- Producer: Gehenna, Øyvind Grødem & Stig Kleppe

Gehenna chronology
Deadlights (1998)	Murder (2000)	WW (2005)

Murder is the fourth full-length album by the Norwegian black metal band Gehenna.

== Track listing ==
1. "Intro" - 1:13
2. "Murder" - 2:46
3. "Worthy Exit" - 3:06
4. "Devout Dementia" - 4:12
5. "The Crucified One" - 3:27
6. "Perfect Hate" - 5:04
7. "To the Grave" - 2:42
8. "Trail of Blood" - 2:30
9. "Master Satan" - 3:23
10. "The Dead" - 3:17

== Credits ==
- Sanrabb - Guitar, Vocals & Synth
- Dolgar - Guitar & Vocals
- E.N. Death - Bass
- Blod - Drums & Percussion

== Additional Credits ==
- Ole "Nekro" Egeli - Additional guitar on "The Crucified One", "Murder" and "Master Satan"
