= Seen Through the Veils of Darkness =

Seen Through the Veils of Darkness (The Second Spell)

Studio album by Gehenna
- Released: October 16, 1995
- Recorded: February–March 1995
- Studio: Sound Suite Studios
- Genre: Black metal
- Length: 43:36
- Label: Cacophonous Records
- Producer: Dirge Rep, Sanrabb, Terje Refsnes

Gehenna chronology
First Spell (1994)	Seen Through the Veils of Darkness (The Second Spell) (1995)	Malice (Our Third Spell) (1996)

Seen Through the Veils of Darkness (The Second Spell) is the first full-length album by the Norwegian black metal band Gehenna. A vinyl LP version, limited to 1000 copies, was released in 1995 by Necromantic Gallery Productions.

== Track listing ==
1. "Lord of Flies" - 5:00 (Lyrics: Sanrabb, Dirge Rep; Music: Dolgar, Sanrabb)
2. "Shairak Kinnummh" - 5:04 (Lyrics: Dirge Rep; Music: Sanrabb, Sarcana)
3. "Vinterriket" - 3:53 (Lyrics: Dolgar; Music: Dolgar, Sanrabb)
4. "A Witch Is Born" - 4:21 (Lyrics: Dolgar, Svartalv; Music: Sanrabb, Sarcana)
5. "Through the Veils of Darkness" - 4:32 (Lyrics: Sanrabb; Music: Sanrabb, Sarcana)
6. "The Mystical Play of Shadows" - 3:08 (Lyrics and music: Sanrabb)
7. "The Eyes of the Sun" - 3:26 (Lyrics: Sanrabb; Music: Sanrabb, Sarcana)
8. "A Myth..." - 8:55 (Lyrics: Svartalv; Music: Sanrabb, Sarcana, Svartalv)
9. "Dark Poems Author" - 5:10 (Lyrics: Sanrabb; Music: Dolgar, Sanrabb, Sarcana)

== Credits ==
- Sanrabb - Guitars, Vocals
- Dolgar - Guitars
- Svartalv - Bass
- Sarcana - Keyboards
- Dirge Rep - Drums
- Garm - guest vocals on the track Vinterriket
