= Malice (Gehenna album) =

1996 studio album by Gehenna

Malice (Our Third Spell)

Studio album by Gehenna
- Released: 23 September 1996
- Recorded: June – August 1996
- Studio: Soundsuite Studios (Norway)
- Genre: Symphonic black metal
- Length: 58:16
- Label: Cacophonous Records
- Producers: Gehenna, Terje Refnes

Gehenna chronology
Seen Through the Veils of Darkness (The Second Spell) (1995)	Malice (Our Third Spell) (1996)	Adimiron Black (1998)

Malice (Our Third Spell) is the second full-length album by the Norwegian black metal band Gehenna.

In 2013, Decibel ranked Malice (Our Third Spell) at number 87 on its list of the Top 100 Black Metal Albums of All Time.

== Track listing ==
1. "She Who Loves the Flames" - 5:00
2. "Made to Suffer" - 4:42
3. "Touched and Left for Dead" - 5:16
4. "Bleeding the Blue Flame" - 5:04
5. "Manifestation" - 4:50
6. "Ad Arma Ad Arma" - 14:00
7. "The Pentagram" - 5:46
8. "Malice" - 3:02
9. "The Word Became Flesh" - 4:53
10. "Before the Seventh Moon" - 5:43

== Credits ==
- Sanrabb - Lead Guitar, Vocals
- Dolgar - Rhythm Guitar, Vocals
- E.N. Death - Bass
- Sarcana - Keyboards
- Dirge Rep - Drums
