= Terrorist (album) =

Studio album by Nattefrost
- Released: 2005
- Recorded: October 2004 to January 2005
- Genre: Black metal
- Length: 48:28
- Label: Season of Mist
- Producer: Nattefrost, Vrangsinn

Nattefrost chronology
Blood & Vomit (2004)	Terrorist (2005)

Terrorist is the second album by Norwegian black metal artist Nattefrost.

== Track listing ==
All lyrics & music by Nattefrost, except where noted.

1. "Nekronaut (Cunt Cunt Gimme More)" – 3:28
2. "Black Metal Suicide (Claws of Perdition)" – 2:12
3. "Hellcommander" – 4:16
4. "Terrorist" – 2:56
5. "Merket for Helvete" (Marked for Hell) 112– 2:15 (Lyrics: Taipan)
6. "Eine Kleine Arschmuzick" – 1:39
7. "Satan Is Endless, Satan Is Timeless" – 1:37
8. "Primitive Death" – 3:49
9. "Goat Worship" – 5:17
10. "Catapultam Urinam Philosophiam" – 0:49
11. "Preteen Deathfuck" – 1:34
12. "Dinsadansdjeveldyrkaar!!! (Youdamndevilworshiper!!!) – 2:27
13. "The Death of Nattefrost (Still Reaching for Hell Part II)" – 16:07

== Personnel ==
- Nattefrost – vocals, guitars, bass, B-3 organ, whistling, various noise, production, engineering, mixing
- Vrangsinn – bass, lead guitar, backing vocals, production, engineering, mixing
- Nordavind – guitars, backing vocals
- Aggressor – drums
- Joe Ronny Moe – drums
- Dirge Rep – drums
- Gunnar Stallseth – drums
- Sanrabb – backing vocals
- Taaken – backing vocals
- Taipan – backing vocals
- Ulvhedin Hoest – backing vocals
- Kulde – backing vocals
- The Transsexual Uberdwarves – backing vocals

== Production ==
- Produced, engineered and mixed by Nattefrost ("Nattepenis") and Vrangsinn
