= Noregs vaapen =

Studio album by Taake
- Released: 19 September 2011
- Recorded: 2010–2011
- Studio: Conclave & Earshot Studios, Bergen
- Genre: Black metal
- Label: Karisma Records (Candlelight in the US)
- Producer: Hoest

Taake chronology
| Taake (2008) | Noregs vaapen (2011) | Stridens hus (2014) |

Noregs vaapen is the fifth full-length studio album by Norwegian black metal band Taake. It was released on 19 September 2011.

The album was rated a 9.1 out of 10 by Metal Injection.

== Track listing ==
All tracks are written by Hoest, except lyrics of track 7 by Ivar Aasen.

| No. | Title | Length |
|---|---|---|
| 1. | "Fra vadested til vaandesmed" (From Ford to Sorrow's Smith) | 6:47 |
| 2. | "Orkan" (Hurricane) | 6:17 |
| 3. | "Nordbundet" (Northbound) | 5:25 |
| 4. | "Du ville ville vestland" (The Wild Wild West) | 6:51 |
| 5. | "Myr" ("Bog") | 5:35 |
| 6. | "Helvetesmakt" (Power from Hell) | 5:37 |
| 7. | "Dei vil alltid klaga og kyta" (They Will Always Complain And Moan / They Will Always Complain And Give Praise) | 10:16 |

== Personnel ==
=== Taake ===
- Hoest – vocals, guitars, bass, drums

=== Additional Personnel ===
- Herbrand Larsen – mastering
- Bjoernar E. Nilsen – mixer, mellotron (track 1 and 5), additional vocals (track 6)
- Nocturno Culto – vocals (track 1)
- Attila – vocals (track 3)
- Demonaz – vocals (track 4)
- V'gandr – vocals (track 4)
- Skaggg – vocals (track 5)
- Lava – guitar solo (track 3)
- Aindiachai – first guitar solo (track 4)
- Gjermund Fredheim – second guitar solo (track 4), guitar solo (track 5), first guitar solo (track 7), banjo (track 5), mandolin (track 6)
- Thurzur – second guitar solo (track 7), sound effects (track 5)
