= Hoest =

Norwegian black metal musician

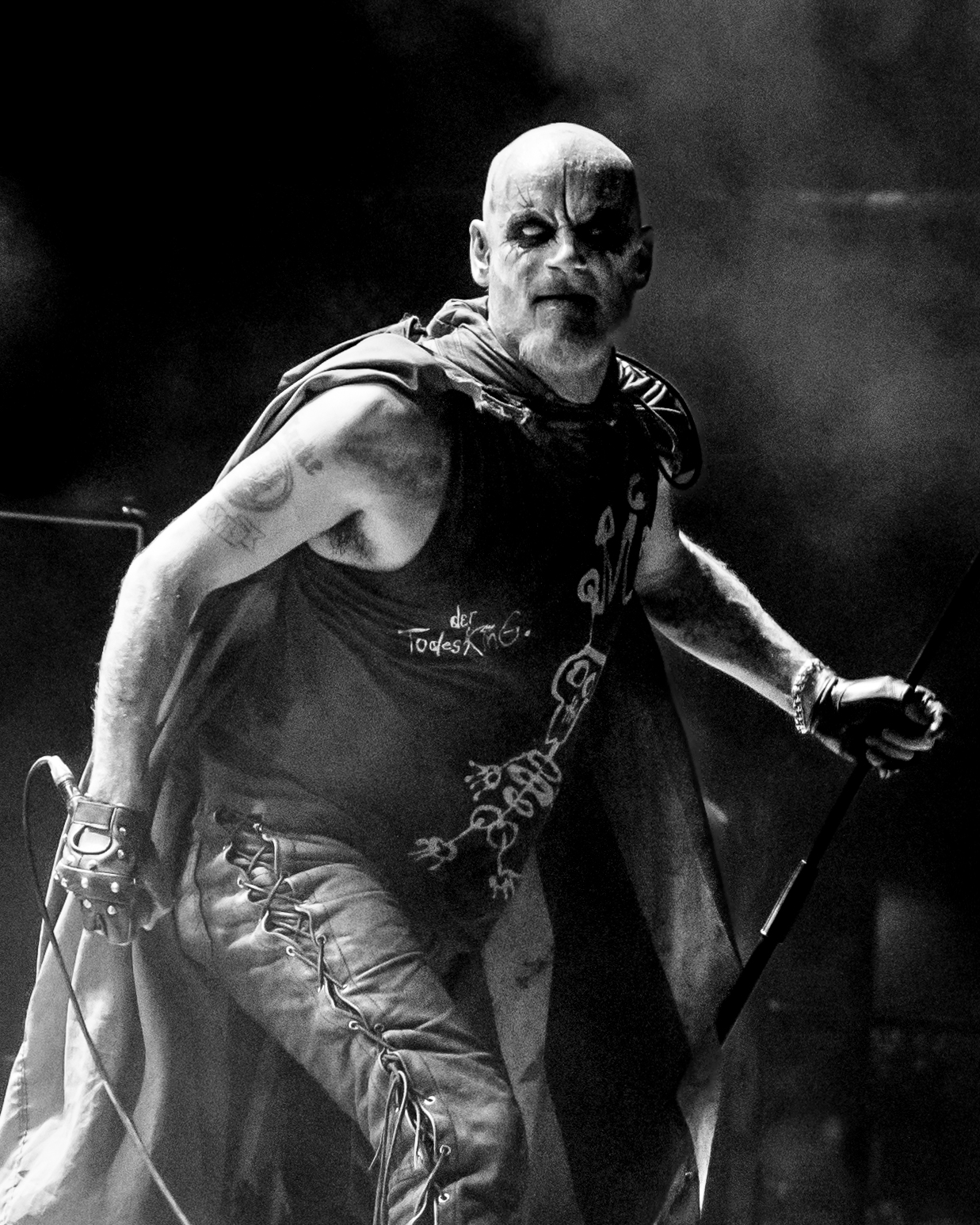
- Hoest with Taake in 2024

Background information
- Also known as: Hoest, Ulvhedin
- Born: Ørjan Stedjeberg; 24 September 1977 (age 49); Bergen, Norway
- Genre: Black metal
- Occupations: Musician; songwriter
- Instruments: Vocals; bass; guitar; drums
- Member of: Taake; Deathcult
- Formerly of: Ragnarok; Ravengod

Ørjan Stedjeberg (born 24 September 1977), better known by his stage name Hoest, is a Norwegian musician who is the founder and songwriter of black metal band Taake. Since the '90s, he has been the band's sole member, recording most instruments for the studio releases – counting nine studio albums and several EPs. As a frontman, Hoest is known for his energetic live performances.

He is also a member of the band Deathcult, the current live vocalist for Gorgoroth and Old Man's Child, and has previously been a member of Ragnarok and Ravengod.

== Career ==
In 1993, Hoest—then known as Ulvhedin—formed the band Thule together with drummer Svartulv. After the release of two demos, in 1995, the band changed their name to Taake, while Ulvhedin adopted the stage name Hoest (Norwegian for "autumn"). Following further demos and the departure of Svartulv, Hoest remained as Taake's sole member.

In 1999, he released Taake's debut album Nattestid Ser Porten Vid, the first release in a trilogy of concept albums linked by the topics of "death, Norway, and the devil in man". Taake's sophomore album, Over Bjoergvin graater himmerik, was released in 2002 and saw the addition of several new band members. In 2005, Taake concluded the trilogy with the album Hordalands doedskvad and went on hiatus due to dissatisfaction with the black metal scene.

In 2008, Taake's self-titled fourth album was released, with Hoest performing all instruments and vocals. The band's fifth studio album, Noregs vaapen (2011), features several prominent Norwegian black metal artists, including Attila Csihar, Nocturno Culto, Demonaz and Ivar Bjørnson. The album was nominated for the Norwegian Spellemann award in the Metal category.

In 2012, Hoest joined Gorgoroth as a live vocalist.

Taake released their sixth studio album, Stridens hus, in 2014. The album Kong Vinter was released in 2017, with critics praising Hoest and Taake's longevity. In 2023, Hoest released the band's first studio album in six years, Et hav av avstand.

== Controversy ==
Hoest served prison sentences for assault in 2006 and 2007.

In March 2007, Hoest appeared on stage at a Taake show in Essen, Germany with a swastika painted on his chest. The incident sparked controversy and caused the band's remaining shows in Germany to be cancelled. Hoest later explained that the act was done to provocate and called it a spontaneous joke done in the spirit of punk.

== Discography ==
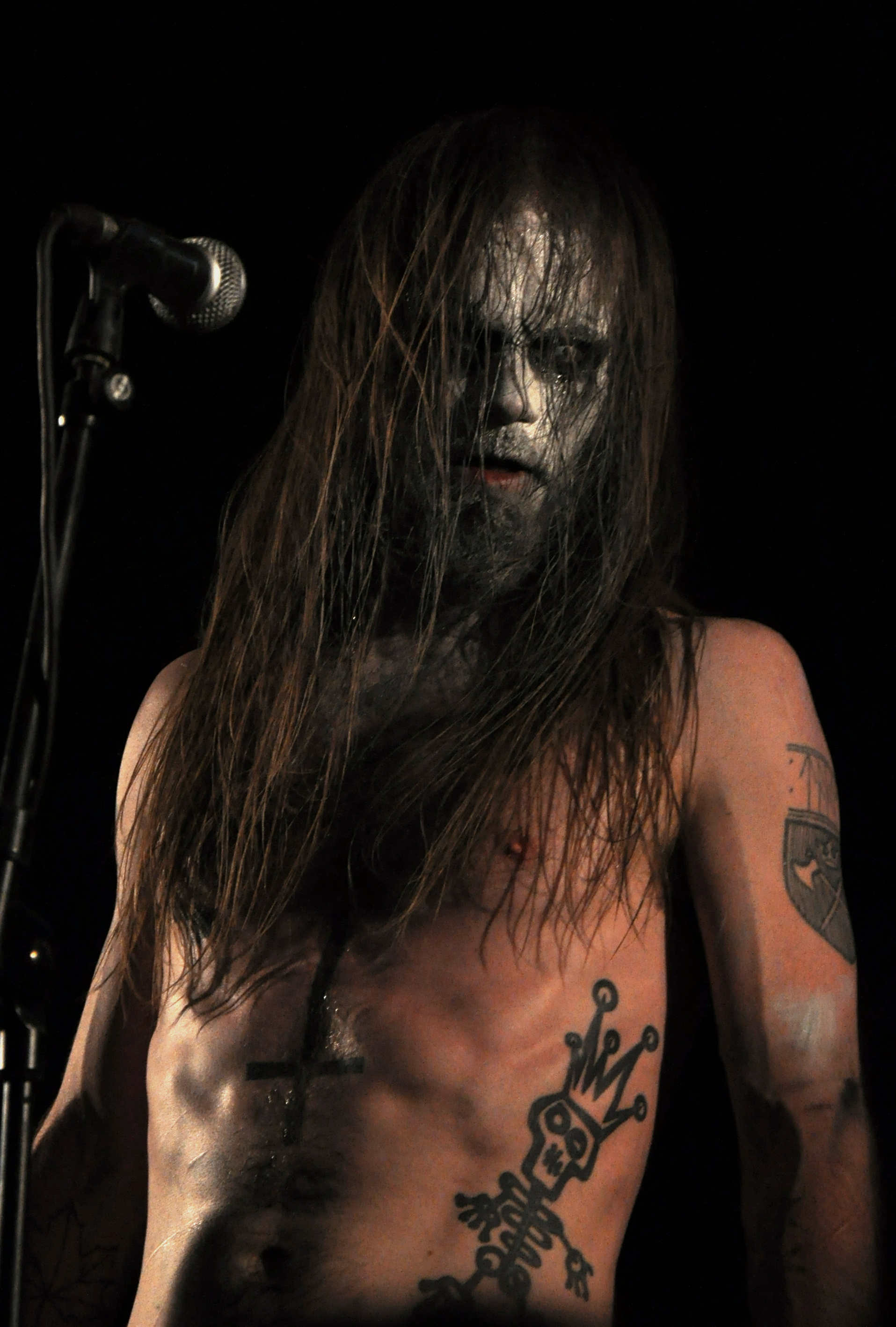
Hoest with Taake in 2009

=== With Taake ===
Studio albums

- Nattestid ser porten vid (Night-time sees the gate wide) (1999)
- Over Bjoergvin graater himmerik (Heaven weeps over Bergen) (2002)
- Hordalands doedskvad (Death poems of Hordaland) (2005)
- Taake (2008)
- Noregs vaapen (Norway's weapon) (2011)
- Stridens hus (House of strife) (2014)
- Kong vinter (King Winter) (2017)
- Et hav av avstand (A Sea of Distance) (2023)
- En skog av nidstang (A forest of nithing poles) (2026)

Studio EPs

- Nekro (2007)
- Kveld (Evening) (2011)
- Kulde (Cold) (2014)
- Baktanker (Ulterior motives) (2017)

Live EPs

- Svartekunst (Dark arts) (2008)

Compilation albums

- Helnorsk svartmetall (All-Norwegian black metal) (2005)
- The Box (2005)
- Gravkamre, Kroner og Troner (Burial Chambers, Crowns and Thrones) (2013)
- 7 Fjell (7 Mountains) (2017)
- Avvik (Deviation) (2021)

=== With Deathcult ===
Studio albums

- Cult Of The Dragon (2007)
- Cult Of The Goat (2017)

Studio EPs

- Bestial Recordings (2021)
- Seven Are They (2024)

=== With Ragnarok ===
Studio albums

- Blackdoor Miracle (2004)

=== With Ravengod ===
Studio EPs

- Ravengod (2017)
- Ravengod (2017)

=== Vocal and instrumental credits ===
Year	Artist	Title	Song(s)	Instrument
2003	Ragnarok	Celtic Frost Tribute – Order Of The Tyrants	"Fainted Eyes"	Vocals
2005	Nattefrost	Terrorist (Nekronaut, Part I)	"Goat Worship"	Vocals
2006	Secht	Secht	"Parasitten menneskedyret"	Vocals
2006	Amok	Necrospiritual Deathcore	"Goatflesh Removal (Corpus Christi)", "Goatflesh Removal (Memento Mori)", "Goatflesh Removal (Gloria In Excelsis Deo)"	Drums
2006	Amok	A Norwegian Hail to Von	"Von"	Drums
2009	Nattefrost	Engangsgrill		Performer
2010	Kvelertak	Kvelertak	"Ulvetid"	Vocals
2010	Helheim	Åsgards Fall	"Dualitet Og Ulver"	Vocals
2010	The Meads Of Asphodel	The Murder Of Jesus The Jew	"Jew Killer"	Vocals
2011	Panychida	Woodland Journey	"Rod Havrana"	Vocals
2011	Helheim	Heiðindómr ok Mótgangr	"Dualitet Og Ulver"	Vocals
2012	Taake	A Tribute To Emperor – In Honour Of Icon E	"I Am The Black Wizards" (Emperor cover)	Vocals
2012	Shining	Redefining Darkness	"Du, Mitt Konstverk"	Voice
2013	Shining	In The Eerie Cold Where All The Witches Dance	"Sensommar"	Lyrics
2014	Alfahanne	Alfapokalyps	"Såld På Mörkret"	Vocals
2015	Orkan	Livlaus	"Uforgjengeleg"	Vocals
2016	Urgehal	Aeons In Sodom	"The Sulphur Black Haze"	Vocals
2016	Djevel	Norske ritualer	"Doedskraft og tri nagler"	Vocals
2018	Ováte	Ováte	"Song Til Ein Orm"	Vocals
2019	Alfahanne	Atomvinter	"Atomvinter"	Vocals
2021	Chris Wicked	Aleine	"Sørgebånd", "Når Allting Svartner", "Bare Deg Og Meg Og Natten"	Bass
2022	Black Void	Antithesis	"Death To Morality"	Vocals
2022	Nyctopia	Full Moon Calling	"Full Moon Calling"	Vocals
2022	The Wolves Of Avalon	Y Gododdin	"Men Of Gododdin"	Vocals
