= Gehenna (band) =

Norwegian black metal band

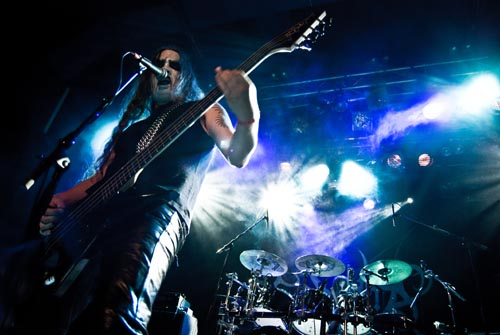
- Live at Hole in the Sky, Bergen Metal Fest 2007

Background information
- Origin: Stavanger, Norway
- Genres: Black metal, symphonic black metal, death metal
- Years active: 1993–present
- Labels: Necromantic Gallery Productions, Head Not Found, Cacophonous, Moonfog Productions, ANP, Indie Recordings
- Members: Dolgar; Sanrabb; Svartalv; Dirge Rep; Sarcana
- Website: ludewigs.net/gehenna

Gehenna (/ɡɪˈhɛnə/ ghi-HEN-ə) is a Norwegian black metal band from Stavanger, formed in 1993.

== History ==
Sanrabb, Dolgar, and Sir Vereda formed Gehenna in January 1993. After their first demo, Black Seared Heart, Vereda left the band due to legal problems, and Dirge Rep replaced him. The band enlisted bassist Svartalv during this time.

In 1994, Necromantic Gallery Productions released Gehenna's first 7-inch EP, Ancestor of the Darkly Sky, and the band signed and cancelled a deal with No Fashion Records. They entered a studio to record a full-length album in January 1994, but it was "cancelled due to NFR's lack of money". Three uncompleted songs from this studio session appear on the re-release of the Black Seared Heart demo via Holycaust Records. They played at "the legendary Zonen concert, which led to the appearance on the now 'cult' norwegian Black Metal documentary 'Det Svarte Alvor'". Gehenna joined Sarcana in 1994 and played at a festival at Lusa Lottes Metal Pub, Oslo, with Dark Funeral, Gorgoroth, Dissection and Enslaved. They signed with Head Not Found and Cacophonous Records. The former released the First Spell EP, the latter released Gehenna's first full-length, Seen Through the Veils of Darkness, in 1995. This record featured a guest appearance by Garm of Arcturus and Ulver singing on the track "Vinterriket".

In 1996, Gehenna released their second full-length album, Malice, and Svartalv left the band. Noctifer replaced him but left to be replaced with E.N.Death. The band performed at the Under the Black Sun festival and toured Europe with Marduk and Mysticum.

In 1997, Sarcana and Dirge Rep left the band and were replaced with Damien and Blod. Gehenna signed with Moonfog Productions, who released the EP Deadlights and the album Adimiron Black (featuring Sarcana on the title track and "Eater of the Dead") in 1998. Damien left the band in 1998. They performed with Dødheimsgard and Gorgoroth in Oslo.

In 2000, Gehenna released Murder and performed a show in Mexico City. E.N.Death left the band, Nekro joined and left, Amok and Kine joined Gehenna, and Blod left and S.Winter replaced him.

The band planned to record their next album in July 2002, but the actual recordings took place in 2004, after Dolgar returned to Gehenna. They released the album, WW, in 2005. It featured a guest appearance by Frost. Gehenna performed at By:larm Stavanger, Zone Trondheim, Inferno Metal Festival and Codevilla, Thunder Road (Milano). S.Winter and Kine left the band.

In 2006, Gehenna signed with ANP Records. Dirge Rep returned as a live session member, and Martin joined as a live session member. They performed with Thundra at Tribute, Sandnes. In 2007, the contract with ANP Records was cancelled, and Dirge Rep became a full-time member again. The band performed with Mayhem at Folken, Stavanger and planned a new album. In 2008, Gehenna signed with Indie Recordings. In 2009, guitarist Skinndød replaced Amok.

In early 2012, the band played at the A389 Bash music festival, an annual event organized by Pulling Teeth guitarist Domenic Romeo. Dirge Rep left the band that year after their show at the Wacken Open Air festival in Germany, and was replaced with Slaktaren.

In 2013, Gehenna recorded and released the album Unravel. This was Skinndød and Slaktaren's first recordings for Gehenna and the band's first album to feature Sanrabb as the only lead vocalist.

Dolgar left after the album was finished and was replaced with Byting. Sanrabb took over vocals.

== Musical style ==
Jackie Smit of Chronicles of Chaos called Gehenna's second full-length album, Malice, "a sterling example of symphonic black metal". According to Sanrabb, the album was "more influenced by the music we listen to ourselves, which basically is classical music and straight-forward heavy metal". Gehenna broke with symphonic black metal after that album. According to Smit, Murder was "a misguided attempt at a death metal record", which disappointed many fans of the band's earlier style. The vocals on that album were closer to shoutings typical for thrash metal than to the high screams typical for Norwegian black metal. In 2002, the band announced that the following album would be "a bit more melodic and keyboard-based than the last two", and that "people who liked the first three albums will be into the new material". Yet WW was "not so much a black metal phoenix rising from the ashes, but a band completely redefining their philosophy toward songwriting […], choosing […] to throw its lot in with the grim sounds of Darkthrone and Burzum. Indeed the record's harsh, raw guitar tone is very similar to the one that gave Hvis Lyset Tar Oss such a maleficent feel, while Dolgar's vocals drip with an unnerving and coarse hatred as the band hammer out their themes of war and destruction at a frenetic pace."

== Lyrics and ideology ==
Gehenna are mostly "about music. This means that the actual lyrics are something we add. Of course, we start out with the music, so it's basically for the music." Many of the lyrics and philosophies are based on Sanrabb's personal Satanic beliefs, "but this does not affect all the lyrics. We wouldn't really fit into the label black metal. Well, we could, but we choose not to label ourselves, which is a new thing to be into nowadays, but anyway... The thing is, it's not purely based on Satanic beliefs or politics or whatever. Because we don't want to deal in propaganda for this or that. […] It's about music, it is - as I said - a medium for our thoughts and feelings. It is also ever-changing. I think that we haven't really put ourselves in a spot where we can't get out if we want to, so to speak. […] My view, when it comes to Satan, is not that he is a 'nice guy'. I do believe in a personified Satan, but not in physical form. But the thing is, if you summon something that is totally and utterly 100% evil, which Satan is supposed to be, absolutely no good will come of it. A lot of people into Satanism have a tendency to say that Satan will serve them, Satan will do this, Satan will do that... Satan will do nothing! Satan hates everything, Satan hates every human being. It's just about being a part of this power. It's nothing that you become, it's something you are, I think, which is my personal belief. To quote Euronymous, 'We are but slaves to the one with horns'. Some people will probably say 'That's pretty silly, because there's no use worshipping someone who hates you', But it's not necessarily about worship. Either way, you don't have to like it, but you are who you are. It's just something that comes very naturally to me. I don't think Satan's a nice guy, though." The lyrics on WW are about war.

== Members ==
Current

- Dolgar – vocals (1993–2012, 2024–present), rhythm guitar (1993–2000, 2024–present), bass (2000–2013)
- Sanrabb – lead guitar, vocals (1993–present)
- Svartalv – bass (1993–1996, 2024–present)
- Dirge Rep – drums (1993–1997, 2006–2012, 2024–present)
- Sarcana – keyboards (1993–1997, 2024–present)

Former

- E.N. Death – bass (1996–2000)
- Blod – drums (1998–2001; died 2018)
- Damien – keyboards (1998–1999)
- Amok – rhythm guitar (2000–2008)
- Kine Hult – keyboards (2000–2005)
- S. Winter – drums (2001–2005)
- Skinndød – rhythm guitar (2009–2024)
- Slátrarinn – drums (2012–2024)
- Byting – bass (2013–2024)

Session

- Sir Vereda – drums (1993)
- Noctifer – bass (1996)

== Discography ==
=== Demos ===
- Black Seared Heart – Necromantic Gallery Productions (1993)
- Black Seared Heart (re-release of BSH Demo, with bonus tracks) – Holycaust Records (1996)

=== EPs ===
- Ancestor of the Darkly Sky (1993)
- Deadlights – Moonfog Productions (1998)

=== Studio albums ===
- First Spell – Head Not Found Records (1994)
- Seen Through the Veils of Darkness (The Second Spell) – Cacophonous Records (1995)
- Malice (Our Third Spell) – Cacophonous Records (1996)
- Adimiron Black – Moonfog Productions (1998)
- Murder – Moonfog Productions (2000)
- WW – Moonfog Productions (2005)
- Unravel – Indie Recordings (2013)

=== Compilation albums ===
- "Transilvanian Hunger" on Darkthrone Holy Darkthrone – Moonfog Productions (1998)
- "Crucified One" on Moonfog 2000 – A Different Perspective – Moonfog Productions (2000)
- "Cursed in Eternity" on Originators of the Northern Darkness – A Tribute to Mayhem – Avantgarde Music (2001)
