= WW (album) =

Studio album by Gehenna
- Released: 2005
- Recorded: Steel Production Studios and Realnoise Studios; July, 2003 - August, 2004
- Genre: Black metal
- Length: 36:43
- Label: Moonfog Productions
- Producer: Gehenna

Gehenna chronology
Murder (2000)	WW (2005)	Unravel (2013)

WW is the fifth full-length album by the Norwegian black metal band Gehenna. It was recorded and released 5 years after their previous album.

Chronicles of Chaos stated, "The bottom line is that Gehenna are back after languishing in the depths of despair for far too long, and they've brought the front runner for black metal album of 2005 with them."

== Track listing ==
1. "Grenade Prayer" - 3:49
2. "Death to Them All" - 3:46
3. "New Blood" - 3:26
4. "Flames of the Pit" - 4:17
5. "Silence the Earth" - 4:24
6. "Werewolf" - 6:19
7. "Abattoir" - 3:57
8. "Pallbearer" - 6:45

== Credits ==
- Sanrabb - Guitar, Vocals & Synth
- Dolgar - Guitar & Vocals
- Amok - Bass
- Kine - Keyboards

== Additional Credits ==
- Frost - Session Drums & Percussion
