= Adimiron Black =

Studio album by Gehenna
- Released: 1998
- Recorded: January–February 1998
- Studio: Soundsuite Studios
- Genre: Black metal
- Length: 36:10
- Label: Moonfog Productions
- Producers: Gehenna and Terje Refnes

Gehenna chronology
| Black Seared Heart (1997) | Adimiron Black (1998) | Deadlights (1998) |

Professional ratings
Review scores
| Source | Rating |
|---|---|
| Rock Brigade | 8/10 |

Adimiron Black is a full-length album by the Norwegian black metal band Gehenna. It was their Moonfog Productions debut. This recording marked a different sound for the band, as this record has more of a heavy metal and death metal influence than their earlier recordings.

== Track listing ==
1. "The Killing Kind" – (Lyrics and music: Sanrabb) 3:39
2. "Deadlights" – (Lyrics and music: Sanrabb) 5:38
3. "Adimiron Black" – (Lyrics and music: Sanrabb) 6:18
4. "Seeds of Man's Destruction" – (Lyrics: Dolgar; music: Sanrabb) 3:56
5. "Devils Work" – (Lyrics and music: Sanrabb) 7:41
6. "Slowly Being Poisoned" – (Lyrics: Dolgar; music: Sanrabb) 4:01
7. "Eater of the Dead" – (Lyrics: Sanrabb; music: Sanrabb, Sarcana) 4:58

== Credits ==
- Sanrabb – Lead Guitar, Vocals
- Dolgar – Rhythm Guitar, Vocals
- E.N. Death – Bass
- Damien – Keyboards
- Blod – Drums
- Sarcana – Additional keyboards on Adimiron Black and Eater of the Dead

== Additional information ==
The cover art on Adimiron Black is by Petter Hegre, a Norwegian photographer, most famous for his nude photography of women.
