= Anders Kobro =

Norwegian drummer (born 1975)

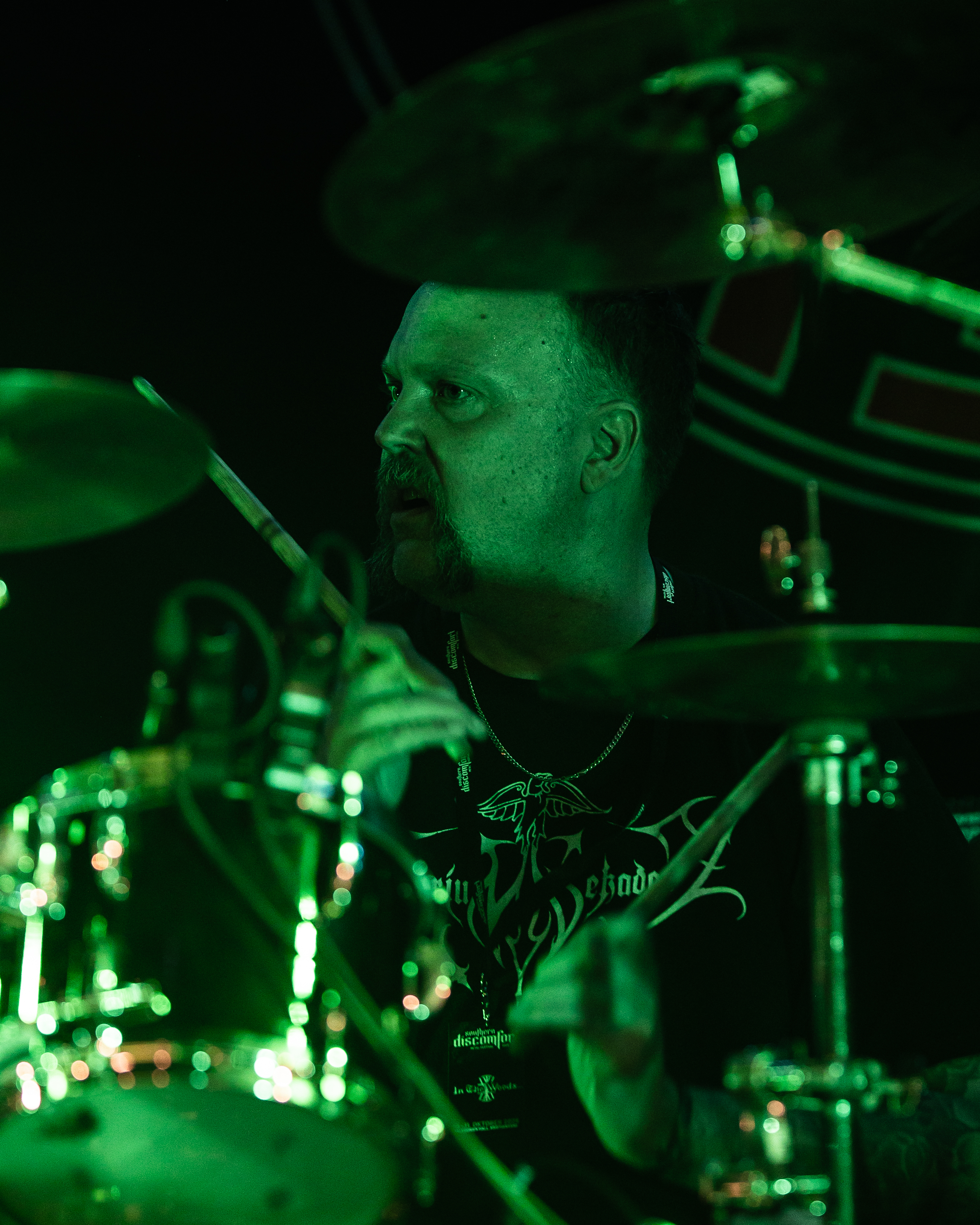
- Performing with In The Woods... in 2025.

Background information
- Born: 10 June 1975 (age 50); Kristiansand, Norway
- Genres: Black metal, progressive metal
- Occupation: Musician
- Instrument: Drums
- Years active: 1989-present
- Member of: In the Woods... Carpathian Forest; Green Carnation

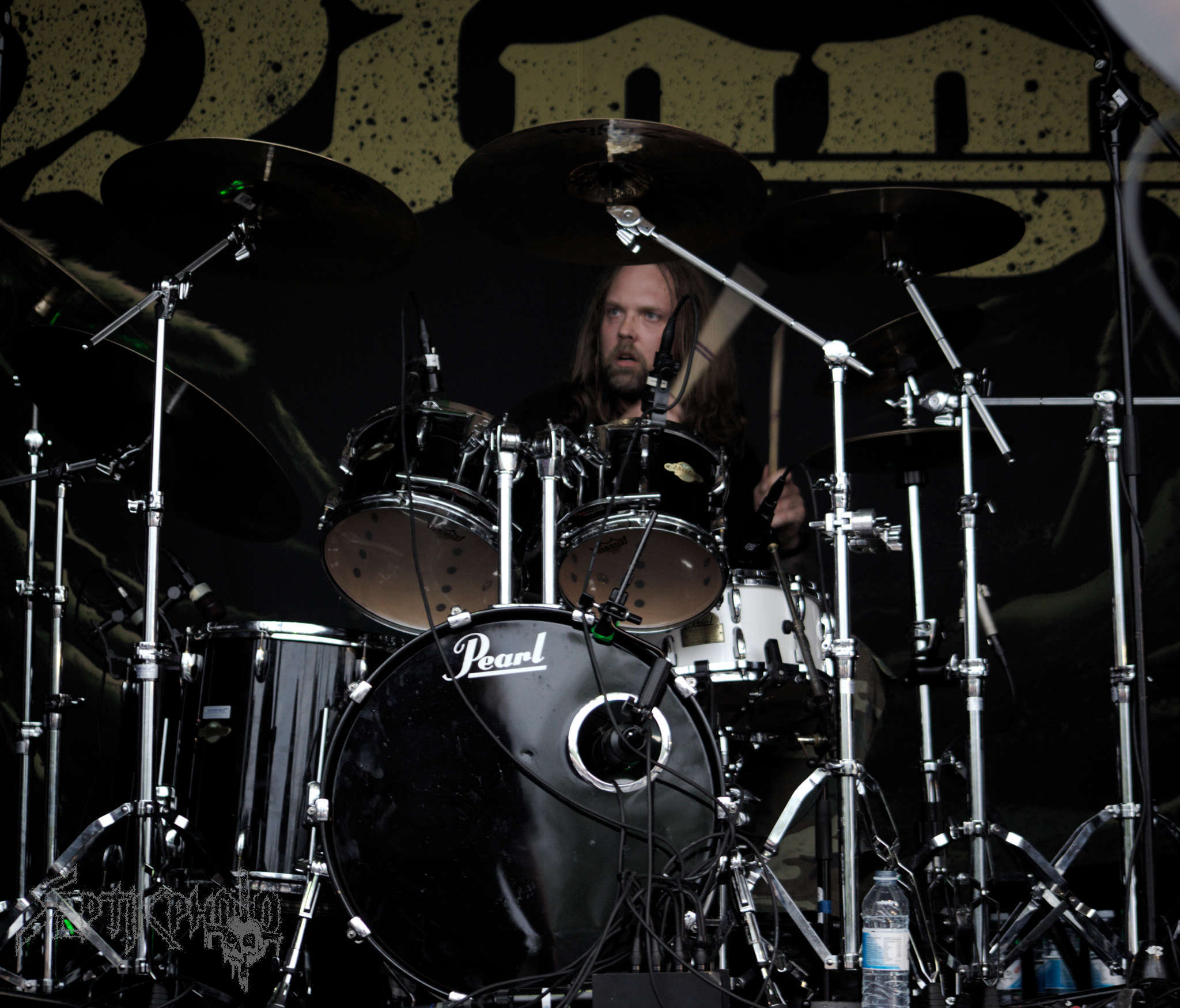
Anders Kobro performing with In The Woods... in 2016

Anders Kobro is a Norwegian drummer who played in the bands In the Woods... and Green Carnation. He was also playing for Carpathian Forest until 2014.

== Early life ==
Anders Kobro was born in Kristiansand, Norway on 10 June 1975. Kobro began playing in the band Green Carnation when he was 14. Kobro rejoined Green Carnation in 2001 and stayed with them until 2005, playing on three of the band's albums.

== With Carpathian Forest ==
Anders Kobro's first collaboration with Carpathian Forest was the debut liveshow for the band at the Quart Festival 1998 in Kristiansand together with Immortal and Satyricon on the bill. Two weeks later Carpathian Forest played at Under the Black Sun festival in Germany. After these two shows Carpathian Forest agreed on continue the work together, so in October 1998 R. Nattefrost, J. Nordavind, Tchort and A. Kobro got together a Friday afternoon in Soundsuite studio with Terje Refnes and much alcohol. The result of that session was the 7-inch He's Turning Blue/Ghoul (Mayhem cover) featured on Tribute to Mayhem album released by Avantgarde Music. One year later the band again entered Soundsuite studio (with Terje Refsnes) and recorded the album Strange Old Brew, and Morbid Fascinations of Death also released on Avantgarde Music.
