= Paolo Baltaro =

Italian musician (born 1967)

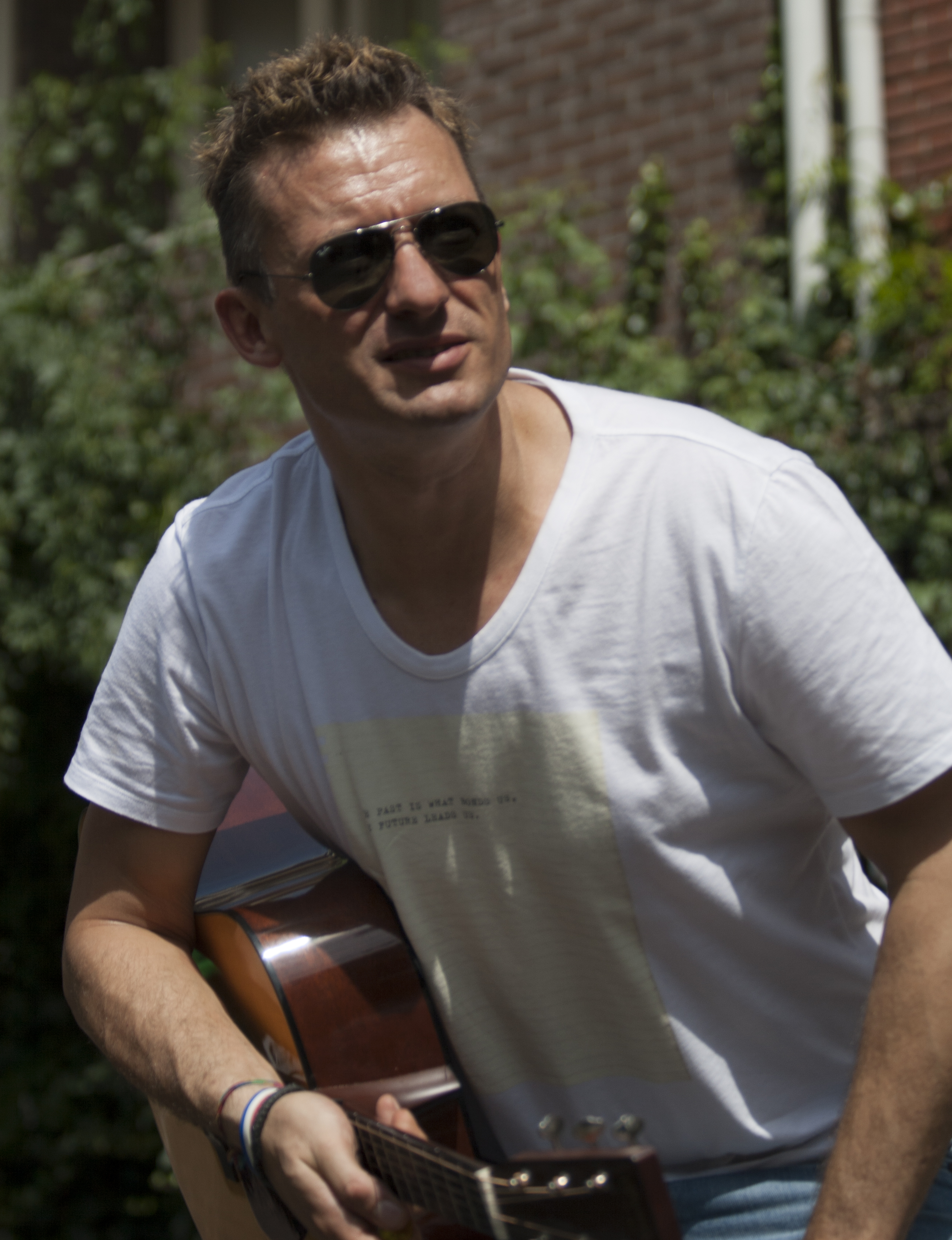
- Baltaro in 2019

Background information
- Born: 22 February 1967 (age 59); Genoa, Italy
- Genres: Rock, pop, progressive rock, jazz
- Occupations: Musician, record producer
- Instruments: Vocals, bass, drums, guitar, keyboards
- Years active: 1980–present
- Labels: Banksville, Ariston Records, AMS-BTF, Toast Records, Mellow Records, Musea, Universal

Paolo Baltaro (born 22 February 1967) is an Italian musician, singer, songwriter, producer, and founder of Banksville Records.

== Career ==
As producer, he has worked with Jazz Bigbox (Banksville), Even Vast (Black Lotus), Gabriel Delta (Banksville), McAllan (Ariston), Arcansiel (Musea), Roulette Cinese (Toast), Società Anonima Decostruzionismi Organici (Btf-Ams), Mhmm (Banksville), Sorella Maldestra (Banksville), Terry Dene and Lica Cecato.

While living in Italy, Baltaro joined the Neo Prog band, Arcansiel, at the time of their third album, Normality of Perversion, which was followed by Swimming in the Sand. In 2008, he formed the experimental nu-jazz quintet S.A.D.O. (Società Anonima Decostruzionismi Organici) as a spin-off of Arcansiel.

With S.A.D.O., he was made the 12th "Tribute to Demetrio Stratos" and also won the "Darwin award of Italian non-conventional music".

In 2010, he was awarded best progressive producer of the year by the Prog Award webzine for the conceptual bilingual album, Weather Underground. In 2008, he released Do Not Disturb, a blues album with Mhmm for Banksville Records as songwriter, producer, singer, bassist and keyboardist.

In 2011, Baltaro released Low Fare Flight to the Earth, his solo album, as singer and composer, playing all instruments, for Musea Records. Now based in London, Baltaro is also the drummer of Laura Guidi and of the Italian punk band, Sorella Maldestra (producer of their second album, Maltempo).

In 2016, he released his first book in Italian, Gli Ambienti Teorici Multidimensionali, with an English language edition available. In the same year, he released his second solo album, The Day After The Night Before. and played the guitar in the Sound Wall Project album Drunk, led by Andrea Bonizzi, with Colin Edwin of Porcupine Tree on bass and Angelo Bruschini of Massive Attack.

In 2017, he produced the original soundtrack of La Tempete, a movie by Ricky Mastro. In January 2019, he released with the S.A.D.O. Società Anonima Decostruzionismi Organici, Musiche per signorine da marito – Cura uditiva della narcolessia in forma Sentenziale (Banksville Records), a double experimental album, in English and Italian versions on the same record, formed of nine songs (total duration: seven minutes and 30 seconds), recorded in Sentential format (song, truth, sentence).

In August 2019, he released with the Brazilian singer Lica Cecato Call Porter – A time warp into Cole Porter's music, made of songs written by Cole Porter, with arrangements based on rock, pop, progressive rock, chill out, electro-punk, Merseybeat, heavy metal and various experimental elements, including elements of contemporary music in the same record. The record was released as by "Lica Cecato and Paolo Baltaro's orchestra".

In July 2026 he released as author, producer and musician with Società Anonima Decostruzionismi Organici the live album Johann Fritz Tannhäuser: Die wiedergefundenen Meisterwerke. Built around the imaginary composer Johann Fritz Tannhäuser, it documents the “Tannhäuser ritrovato” concert held on 7 November 2025 at the church of San Pietro Martire in Vercelli during the Suoni Diversi series. The work combines composition, improvisation, sound theatre and timbral research.

== Discography ==
- 1994: Normality Of Perversion (Arcansiel) (Mellow Records mmp 203) (bass, keyboards, producer)
- 1991: Esperimenti di Free Jazz (Quintetto Steu Battezzato) (Cd Baby) (Sassofono, Chitarra, producer)
- 1994: Lisciometal à Go-Go (Banksville Records pac 003) (drums, bass, keyboards and producer)
- 1994: Implosioni (Società Anonima Decostruzionismi Organici) (Banksville Records) (bass, keyboards and producer)
- 1995: Teratoarchetipia (Società Anonima Decostruzionismi Organici) (Banksville Records) (bass, keyboards and producer)
- 1999: Hear Me Out (Even Vast) – (Black Lotus Records – BLR/CD 009) (drums)
- 2001: La Differanza (Società Anonima Decostruzionismi Organici) (Banksville Records Creative Commons)(bass, keyboards and producer)
- 2003: Che Fine Ha Fatto Baby Love (Roulette Cinese) (Toast Records tdmlc01) (bass, keyboards and producer)
- 2004: Swimming in the Sand (Arcansiel) (Musea fgbg 4560 ar, edizioni Universal Music) (Voce, bass, keyboards and producer)
- 2007: Holzvege (Società Anonima Decostruzionismi Organici) (Ams amscd122) (bass, keyboards and producer)
- 2008: Do Not Disturb (Mhmm) (Banksville Records 6858 – Btf) (Voce, drums, bass, keyboards and producer)
- 2009: Maltempo (Sorella Maldestra) (Banksville Records 200903 – Audioglobe) (drums and producer)
- 2009: Low Fare Flight to the Earth (solo album) (Musea fgbg 4815 ar, edizioni Universal Music)
- 2009: Imprescindibile Momento di Cultura Italiana (Live) (Società Anonima Decostruzionismi Organici) (Ams amscd 174 cd) (bass and producer)
- 2010: Weather Underground (Società Anonima Decostruzionismi Organici) (Banksville Records 201002 – Audioglobe) (bass, keyboards and producer)
- 2011: The Rock Is Rolling Again con Terry Dene and Gabriel Delta (Banksville Records) (unreleased)(drums, keyboards and producer)
- 2012: Ortoboia (Abajiur Ruaial) (Banksville Records) (keyboards and producer)
- 2012: Il Lato A della Serie B – Salutate 7 Scudetti (Sorella Maldestra) (Banksville Records 201205)(drums and producer)
- 2015: Herpes (McAllan) – (Banksville Records) 200145 -ristampa- (keyboards, chitarra ritmica, cori and producer)
- 2016: DRUNK with Sound Wall Project prod. Andrea Bonizzi, feat. Angelo Bruschini e Colin Edwin (Banksville Records) (Guitar) PKMP1602
- 2017: The Day After The Night Before – Original soundtracks for imaginary movies (Banksville Records) kmp 1601
- 2017: La Tempete – Original Soundtrack (Banksville Records) BR4500217
- 2018: Live Pillheads (live) (solo album, con i Pillheads) (Banksville Records) PKMP 01791
- 2019: Musiche per signorine da marito – Cura uditiva della narcolessia in forma Sentenziale (Società Anonima Decostruzionismi Organici) (Banksville Records) BAA-38178
- 2019: Call Porter – A time warp into Cole Porter's music by Lica cecato and Paolo Baltaro's orchestra (Banksville Records) PKMP1991
- 2022: A New World? by Gabriel Delta Paolo Baltaro & Daniele Mignone (Banksville Records) PKMP01681
- 2023: TANATOFOBIA Vaccino uditivo contro la paura di morire in forma sentenziale (Società Anonima Decostruzionismi Organici) (Banksville Records) (All instruments, producer) PKMP01682
- 2024: Digitare Prima dei Pasti (The Pillheads) (Banksville Records) (Guitar, vocals, production) PKMP68510
- 2026: Johann Fritz Tannhäuser: Die wiedergefundenen Meisterwerke (with Società Anonima Decostruzionismi Organici) (Banksville Classics, 2026; BR04571)

== Compilations ==
- 1992: Sanscemo 92
- 2008: Guitars dancing in the light (Mellow Records 2008) con il medley Jingo / Moonflower / Tales Of Kilimangiaro
- 2013: More Animals at the Gates of Reason – A Tribute to Pink Floyd (BTF 2013)
- 2013: Musiche Per Viaggiatori Distratti (compilation) (Banksville Records)

== Collaborations ==
- 1992 – Donatella Rettore – Son Rettore e canto – (RCA Italiana/BMG Ariola) (chitarrista, per l'inedita versione del disco prodotta da Roberto Colombo)
- 1992 – Gibì Franco – Ragazzo del '67 – (Pinkrecords AF349) (Productor)
- 1992 – Quintetto Steu Battezzato – Esperimenti di free jazz – (Banksville Records AF0119) (Producer, saxophonist and guitarist)
- 1993 – Velivolivolanti (Alessio Bertallot) – promo – (Sound Engineer, tastiere)
- 1993 – Maken B (Gianluca Mercadante) – 45gg "Droga Rock – Cosa vuol dire?" (Pinkrecords AF350) (Producer)
- 1992 – Mortuary Drape – Into The Drape – Decapitated Records (Sound Engineer)
- 1993 – Point of View – Misguided Confidence (Inaudito Dischi) – INAUDITO 9 (Sound Engineer)
- 1994 – Opera IX The Call of the Wood – Miscarriage Records (Sound Engineer)
- 1994 – Point of View Grey – Mele Marce Records (Sound Engineer)
- 1995 – Chaos and Technocracy Abstract... and More – Nosferatu Records (Sound Engineer)
- 1996 – Nemici dell'Igene – From Rock-a-Boom to Water Close (Banksville Records AF37128) (Guitarist)
- 2000 – PG2000 – I Grandi Successi – Peoplesound Records (Sound Engineer)
- 2001 – Cesare Bardelli – Remasters (Restauro)
- 2002 – Toxic Poison – Nothing's Forever Banksville Records (co-producer)
- 2003 – Strumpazzizzy – Notes (Szy 101) (co-produzione)
- 2004 – Fabrizio Consoli – singolo L'amore non-paga, for Fred Buscaglione Jr. (co-autore e co-produzione)
- 2004 – Riarangià – Riarangià, (Co-producer and keyboards)
- 2005 – Faber Per Sempre – un progetto di Per Michelatti su musica di Fabrizio De André (keyboardist)
- 2006 – Toxic Poison – Cold Hate Hot Blood – Banksville Records (co-producer)
- 2006 – Matrioska – Stralunatica – Produzione Pier Michelatti (Sound Engineer)
- 2010 – Toxic Poison – The Beast Is Back – Banksville Records (co-producer)
- 2010 – Enrico Ruggeri – Vivi (singolo) – Universal Music Italia Srl (Piano)
- 2011 – Smodati – La gloria è nei momenti – Brit Beat (co-producer)
- 2012 – Mauro Ermanno Giovanardi Ho Sognato Troppo L'Altra Notte? Sony Music 88697718372
- 2013 – Francesco Sarcina (El. piano engineer)
- 2013 – Garrison Fewell – versione di "Everytime we say goodbye" (Cole Porter)
- 2014 – Leigh de Vries – singoli: Dead City e Saw Blade (bass, guitar, drums, producer)
- 2015 – Frenky dei Rogers – singolo To You (Produzione)
- 2015 – Lica Cecato – (Sound engineer)
- 2017 – Sound Wall Project – (Guitarist – Co-sound engineer)
- 2018 – Laura Guidi – The Point – (drums)

== Publications ==
- Guido Michelone, Vercelli Nel Juke Box, Editrice White Light, alla voce Paolo Baltaro, pag 128 e Arcansiel, pag 128
- Massimo Forni, Lungo Le Vie Del Prog, Editrice Palladino, pag. 177
- Federico Guglielmi, Il Punk, Editrice Apache (1994), voce Sorella Maldestra
- Andrea Parentin, An introduction to Italian Progressive Rock, ISBN 146373428X, pag. 315
- Paolo Baltaro, Gli Ambienti Teorici Multidimensionali, Editrice Banksville Books (2016) ISBN 1537636936

== Soundtracks ==
- 1990: Il Ritorno della Cicogna Bianca di Carlo Donis, documentary – prod. Piero Angela, Quark / Rai 1
- 1990: The Tree by Achaz Hardnberg, cartoon, MXM productions
- 1998: Claas international, industrial documentary, prod. Tecnomovie
- 1995: Caro cavallo, homevideo, International Press – Polyeditor
- 1995: La lampada di Aladino, cartoon, prod. Tecnomovie- Polyeditor
- 1996: I Nemici dell’Ig(i)ene – The Movie, feature film, Pinkstudio / Banksville Records
- 1998: La patente B in video, homevideo course, prod. Tecnomovie Polyeditor – International press
- 1998: RIV-SKF, industrial documentary, prod. Tecnomovie
- 1999: CLAAS, it's all about the soil, industrial documentary, prod. Tecnomovie
- 2012: Il museo delle cere, theathral show by G. Pacella
- 2013: Artica Biancaneve, theathral show by G. Pacella
- 2013: Mamà by Raul Donovan, short film, Banksville Records
- 2015: Intrecci d’arte, theathral show, co-production Paolo Baltaro e G. Pacella
- 2016: L’Attache by Magica Aidan, directed by Gianni Opezzo and Paolo Baltaro, Banksville Records
- 2017: La Tempete – Original Soundtrack, short film, Banksville Records
- 2022: L'Anniversario- a movie by Gabriel Maius Stancu Original soundtrack by The Pillheads
