= Black Flame (band) =

Italian black metal band

- Origin: Italy
- Genre: Black metal
- Years active: 1998-present
- Labels: Sombre Records; Eerie Art Records; Worship Him Records; Forces of Satan Records; Regain Records; Behemoth Productions
- Members: Cardinale Italo Martire m:A Fog; Tiorad; Silent
- Past members: Serpentrax (1998-2011); Gnosis (2011-2016)
- Website: black-flame.net

Black Flame is an Italian black metal band, formed in 1998 in the districts surrounding the towns of Asti and Turin.

== History ==
Cardinale Italo Martire, Serpentrax and m:A Fog formed Black Flame in 1998. They played occult-influenced "cold and raw" black metal. Little is known of the band's first years of activity, since they didn't have an official website and communicated with fans and media through letters or email.

=== "Welcome" and "Orgiastic Funeral" Demo era 2001-2002 ===
Black Flame released their first two demos, Welcome and Orgiastic Funeral, in 2001 and 2002, followed by several live performances. Both demos raised interest in the band, which culminated in the recruitment of drummer m:A Fog from Mortuary Drape. This helped Black Flame to be known outside Italy. German label Sombre Records released, in late 2002, the 350-copy limited 7-inch EP From Ashes I'll Reborn.

=== "The Third Revelation" and "Torment & Glory" Album era 2003-2004 ===
The Third Revelation, Black Flame's first full-length album, was released in April 2003. Media and public speculated as to whether it was a proper full-length album, since it was self-released. The media received the record well, supporting the notion that it was a proper full release. This album included a cover version of Mortuary Drape's "Abbot", with Mortuary Drape's original vocalist, Wildness Perversion, on vocals, as a statement of a band rooted in old-school extreme metal. The live activity of the band increased in 2003, and culminated in a show with Norwegian bands Carpathian Forest and Tsjuder. Their second full-length album, Torment and Glory, was released by Eerie Art Records in CD format in later 2004, accompanied by a release in LP format by the American label Shades of Death Records and a tape version by the Italian Bylec-Tum Prods.

=== "Conquering Purity" and "Imperivm" Album era 2005-2008 ===
After doing some more live work, the band again returned to the studio and released their third full-length album, Conquering Purity, in May 2006, an album which was very well received. Reviews applauded in particular what was seen as the incredible intensity of the work and its genuine roots in the late 1980s' sound. The album featured Peter Kubik, guitarist from the Austrian band Abigor, as songwriter. In 2006, Black Flame became the first band to sign on Forces of Satan Records, the Norwegian record label run by Gorgoroth guitarist and founder Infernus. The complexity of Black Flame compositions, progressively increased through all the releases, brought them to add a second live session guitarist for the live performances, so in 2007 Tiorad from the band Adversam was added to the live line-up. With the four piece live line-up, Black Flame performed for the first time in Norway in the towns of Oslo and Stavanger, marking a very rare event for an Italian underground band. Through this years the drummer m:A Fog has joined several other bands, establishing himself as a requested drummer: Glorior Belli (France), Slavia (Norway), Dissiplin (Norway), Janvs (Italy), and Dead to This World (Norway). This, however, has not halted the progress of Black Flame, who entered the One Voice Studios in November 2007 to record the new album Imperivm. The band's fourth full-length album, this was released in June 2008 through Forces of Satan Records and Regain Records. Imperivm was named "Album of the Month" in the June 2008 issue of Rock Hard Italy, and also received positive reviews in other notable metal magazines such as the German Rock Hard and Metal Hammer Italy. Thanks to this grown visibility, Black Flame reached an endorsement deal with Gibson guitars and basses and Trick Drums.

=== "Septem" era and line up changes 2011-2014 ===
In February 2011, Black Flame announced the release of a new album entitled Septem and was to be released in 2011 through Italian cult label Behemoth Productions/Masterpiece Distribution. It was also announced that the artwork for the album would be created by Niklas Sundin, guitarist of Swedish melodic death metal band Dark Tranquillity. In summer 2011, bass player Serpentrax was forced to leave the band for personal reasons. This event marked the first line-up change in the band since its creation. The live activity performed in support of Septem album has been realized with a session live bass player, Gnosis from the band Mystical Fullmoon. In December 2013, Black Flame released to the press a statement confirming that Tiorad and Gnosis have been officially added in the line-up.

=== "The Origin of Fire" and "Necrogenesis: Chants from the Grave" 2015-2019 ===
Black Flame surfaced again in 2014 by signing a deal with the Italian cult label Avantgarde Music for the release of one album. "The Origin of Fire" was released in 2015 and included collaborations with P.K. from Abigor and Iscariah (ex-Immortal). In 2016, Black Flame announced the departure of the bass player Gnosis, replaced in 2017 by Silent. With the new line-up, Black Flame signed a contract with the Italian label Dusktone and released "Necrogenesis: Chants from the Grave" in May 2019. Shortly after the release of the album, the band went on a European mini-tour with label-mates Opera IX, with which Black Flame also shared the drummer, m:A Fog, between 2014 until 2020.

== Members ==
- Italo "Cardinale Italo Martire" D'Urso - vocals, guitars (1998–present)
- Massimo "m:A Fog" Altomare - drums (1998–present)
- Eric "Tiorad" Da Roit - guitars (2007-2013 as session and since 2013 in the line-up)
- Silent - bass (2017–present)

=== Former members ===
- Diego "Serpentrax" Vanzo - bass (1998–2011)
- Carlo "Gnosis" Belli - bass (2011-2016)

Timeline

== Discography ==
=== Full-length albums ===
- The Third Revelation (2003) (self-released)
- Torment and Glory (2004) (Eerie Art Records)
- Conquering Purity (2006) (Worship Him Records)
- Imperivm (2008) (Forces of Satan Records/Regain Records)
- Septem (2011) (Behemoth Productions/Masterpiece Distribution)
- The Origin of Fire (2015) (Avantgarde Music)
- Necrogenesis: Chants from the Grave (2019) (Dusktone)

=== EPs ===
- From Ashes I'll Reborn (7-inch) (2002) (Sombre Records)
- The Negative Aura (10-inch) (2024) (Dusktone)

=== Demos ===
- Welcome (demo) (2001)
- Orgiastic Funeral (demo) (2002)

=== Compilation albums ===
- Black Celtic Summit V (2004)
- Signvm Martis B.M.I.A. Compilation (2008)
