= Maleventum =

Studio album by Opera IX
- Released: January 2002
- Recorded: 2001
- Genre: Symphonic black metal, gothic metal
- Length: 54:17
- Label: Avantgarde Music
- Producer: Opera IX

Opera IX chronology
| The Black Opera: Symphoniæ Mysteriorum in Laudem Tenebrarum (2000) | Maleventum (2002) | Anphisbena (2004) |

Maleventum is the fourth studio album by Italian symphonic black metal band Opera IX, released in 2002 through Avantgarde Music. It was the only album of the band that featured Madras on vocals and Taranis on drums; they replaced former vocalist Cadaveria and drummer Flegias, who departed the band the year before.

== Track listing ==
All tracks are written by Opera IX.

| No. | Title | Length |
|---|---|---|
| 1. | "Maleventum" | 5:56 |
| 2. | "Princess of the Ancient" | 7:50 |
| 3. | "In the Dark I Found the Reflection of the Hidden Mirrors" | 5:31 |
| 4. | "Unearthed Arcana" | 10:21 |
| 5. | "Muscaria" | 9:04 |
| 6. | "Forgotten Gods" | 7:56 |
| 7. | "In the Raven's Eyes" | 7:39 |

== Personnel ==
Opera IX

- Madras — vocals
- Ossian D'Ambrosio — guitars
- Vlad — bass
- Taranis — drums
- Lunaris — keyboards
