= The Black Opera: Symphoniæ Mysteriorum in Laudem Tenebrarum =

The Black Opera: Symphoniae mysteriorum in laudem tenebrarum

Studio album by Opera IX
- Released: 2000
- Genre: Symphonic black metal, gothic metal
- Length: 51:04
- Label: Avantgarde Music
- Producer: Opera IX

Opera IX chronology
Sacro Culto (1998)	The Black Opera: Symphoniae mysteriorum in laudem tenebrarum (2000)	Maleventum (2002)

The Black Opera: Symphoniæ Mysteriorum in Laudem Tenebrarum is the third studio album by Italian symphonic black metal band Opera IX, released in 2000, through Avantgarde Music. In this album, Opera IX drops some of their doom metal influences, heading to a more gothic-influenced instrumentation. This would also be the last album by Opera IX to feature Cadaveria on vocals and Flegias/Marcello Santos on drums; they would leave the band in the following year.

The album is styled in the way of an opera, divided in six acts. It also contains a bonus track, unrelated to the album's concept, a cover of Bauhaus' "Bela Lugosi's Dead".

The album's subtitle is Latin for "Symphony in praise of the mysteries of the shadows".

== Track listing ==
All tracks are written by Opera IX, unless noted.

No.	Title	Length
1.	"The First Seal" (Act I)	9:39
2.	"Beyond the Black Diamond Gates" (Act II)	7:14
3.	"Carnal Delight in the Vortex of Evil" (Act III)	6:13
4.	"Congressus cum dæmone" (Act IV)	10:24
5.	"The Magic Temple" (Act V)	4:16
6.	"The Sixth Seal" (Act VI)	7:50

Bonus track
No.	Title	Writer(s)	Length
7.	"Bela Lugosi's Dead" (Bauhaus cover)	David J, Daniel Ash, Kevin Haskins, Peter Murphy	5:28

== Personnel ==
Opera IX

- Cadaveria (Raffaella Rivarolo) — vocals
- Ossian D'Ambrosio — guitars
- Vlad — bass
- Flegias, a.k.a. Marcello Santos (Alberto Gaggiotti) — drums
- Lunaris — keyboards
