= Sacro =

Sacro may refer to:

- In combination with other words, the sacrum (e.g. sacroiliac)
- The Sacro Convento, a Franciscan friary in Assisi, Umbria, Italy
- Monte Sacro, a hill in Rome on the banks of the river Aniene
- Sacro (album), a 2026 album by Serena Brancale

== See also ==
- Sacromonte, a neighbourhood of Granada, Spain
- Sacro Vergente, an Apostolic Letter of Pope Pius XII to all people of Russia
- Cuore Sacro, a 2005 Italian-language film directed by Ferzan Ozpetek
- Sacro Culto, the second album by Opera IX
