= The Call of the Wood =

Studio album by Opera IX
- Released: 1995
- Recorded: August and September 1994 at PKM Studio
- Genre: Symphonic black metal, black-doom
- Length: 59:25
- Label: Miscarriage Records
- Producer: Opera IX

Opera IX chronology
The Call of the Wood (1995)	Sacro Culto (1998)

The Call of the Wood is the debut album by Italian symphonic black metal band Opera IX, released through Miscarriage Records in 1995. It would be re-released by Avantgarde Records in 2001, with two bonus tracks.

In 2009, the album was completely remastered and once more reissued, this time through Peaceville Records, retaining the two bonus tracks from the 2001 re-release.

== Track listing ==
All tracks are written by Opera IX.

No.	Title	Length
1.	"Alone in the Dark"	18:28
2.	"Esteban's Promise"	7:14
3.	"The Call of the Wood"	11:10
4.	"Al Azif"	8:57
5.	"Sepulcro"	13:46

Avantgarde Music 2001 re-issue bonus tracks
No.	Title	Length
6.	"Born in the Grave"	4:03
7.	"Rhymes About Dying Stones"	4:20

== Personnel ==
Opera IX

- Cadaveria (Raffaella Rivarolo) — vocals
- Ossian D'Ambrosio — guitars
- Vlad — bass
- Flegias, a.k.a. Marcelo Santos (Alberto Gaggiotti) — drums

Guest musicians

- Silent Bard — keyboards
