= Altomare =

Altomare may refer to the following people:

- Bobby Alto (Robert Altomare, 1938–2012), American actor, comedian and performer
- Brittany Altomare (born 1990), American golfer
- Christy Altomare (born 1986), American actress and singer-songwriter
- Massimo Altomare (m:A Fog) (born 1979), Italian heavy metal musician
- Nello Altomare (1963–2025), Canadian politician
- Tony Altomare (1928–2003), American wrestler
