= Tronus Abyss =

Band

Tronus Abyss is a cult "electro-apocalyptic" band from Italy. They started out in 1997 with a quite plain symphonic black metal album ("The King of Angel in the Abyss"), but in 1999 they recorded "Rotten Dark", an album crossing the boundaries of extreme music and redefining new styles. Rotten Dark was a mix of powerful black metal, industrial, medieval profane music, neoclassical and apocalyptic-folk.

== History ==
In 2003, they redefined again their style with their third album, Kampf. Labeling their style as "electro-apocalyptic", Kampf moved toward an electronic and bombastic style, yet obscure and malevolent. The press defined Kampf as a true masterpiece due to his originality and revolutionary musical approach. They also appear in "Visions - a Tribute to Burzum" original tribute album playing a martial-neofolk version of Moti Ragnarokum and in a Fluttering Dragon comp. called "Triumph des todes", along with other famous industrial bands, with a version of the track "Radio Europa" originally released on "Kampf". In October 2008 they released their fourth album, Vuoto Spazio Trionfo, which incorporated avant-garde and ambient elements.

B. Malphas left the band to join the Post-Black Metal band Janvs in 2007, but rejoined Tronus Abyss in 2011. The new lineup is currently working on the fifth album.

== Members ==
=== Current ===
- Atratus - Vocals
- B. Malphas - Synths, piano, machines, samples, programming, bass, acoustic guitar
- Mord - Guitar, machines, samples

=== Former ===
- Il Monaco - Keyboards
- Il Marchese - Bass
- Axion412 - Drums
