= Septem =

Septem may refer to:

- 7 (number), Latin: septem
- Ceuta, for which Septem is an ancient name, derived from the seven hills surrounding it, known as the seven brothers
- Septem Provinciae, a province of the Roman Empire
- Septem, a 2011 album by Black Flame

== See also ==
- Septum
- September
