= In Your Blood =

Studio album by Cadaveria
- Released: May 21, 2007
- Genre: Black metal Gothic metal
- Length: 50:06
- Label: Season of Mist

Cadaveria chronology
Far Away from Conformity (2004)	In Your Blood (2007)

Professional ratings
Review scores
Source	Rating
Terrorizer	4/10 stars

In Your Blood is Cadaveria's third full-length album, and was released May 21, 2007 worldwide by Season of Mist. The United States and Canada release date was a day later, on May 22, 2007.

== Track listing ==
No.	Title	Length
1.	"100.000 Faces"	3:01
2.	"The Dream"	4:15
3.	"Anagram"	2:44
4.	"Memento Audere Semper"	5:33
5.	"Laying in Black"	4:24
6.	"Queen of Forgotten"	4:57
7.	"Exorcism to Chaos"	4:17
8.	"Uneven Like Clouds"	4:15
9.	"Before the Apes Came"	4:47
10.	"Virtual Escape from Tragedy"	4:06
11.	"Atypical Suggestions by a Dead Artist"	3:33
12.	"Enlightened"	4:14
