= The Shadows' Madame =

Studio album by Cadaveria
- Released: March 2002
- Recorded: September–November 2001, Captain Woofer Studios
- Genre: Black metal
- Length: 38:20
- Label: Scarlet Records
- Producer: Cadaveria

Cadaveria chronology
The Shadows' Madame (2002)	Far Away From Conformity (2004)

Professional ratings
Review scores
Source	Rating
Allmusic	4.9/5 stars

The Shadows' Madame is the debut album for Cadaveria.

== Track listing ==
- All lyrics and music by Cadaveria, unless otherwise noted.

No.	Title	Lyrics	Music	Length
1.	"Spell"	Cadaveria, Baudelaire	Cadaveria, Verdi	5:53
2.	"Declaration of Spiritual Independence"			5:10
3.	"In Memory of Shadows' Madame"			4:12
4.	"Circle of Eternal Becoming"	Cadaveria, Yeats		4:57
5.	"The Magic Rebirth"			6:50
6.	"Black Glory"			4:11
7.	"Absolute Vacuum"			7:10

- Note: Parts of the lyric for "Circle of Eternal Becoming" were taken directly from Yeats' "Ideas of Good and Evil"; hence the lyrical co-credit. Baudelaire receives a co-credit on "Spell" as the band used parts of "Les Fleurs du Mal". The third and last outside credit comes from Giuseppe Verdi; "Spell" incorporates the music from act II/scene XV of Verdi's "La Traviata".

== Personnel ==
- Cadaveria: Vocals
- Frank Booth: Guitars
- Baron Markonen: Keyboards
- Killer Bob: Bass
- Marcelo Santos (aka Flegias): Drums

== Production ==
- Arranged and Produced by Cadaveria
- Recorded and mixed by John DNA
- Mastered by Alberto Cutolo at Massive Arts Studios
- All songs copyright BL Music
