= Marcello Capra =

- Born: 1953; Turin, Italy
- Genres: Folk blues
- Occupation: Musician
- Instrument: Guitar
- Years active: 1972–present
- Website: www.marcellocapra.com

Marcello Capra (born 1953 in Turin) is an Italian guitarist. His style enables the listener to hear a rhythm although everything is played on guitar (John "Bo Bo" Bollermberg).

== Discography ==
=== Vinyl ===
Year	Title	Label
1972	Frontiera with Procession	Help/RCA (Italy)
1978	Aria Mediterranea	Mu Records (Italy)

=== CD ===
Year	Title	Label
1989	Frontiera	Edison (Japan)
1993	Frontiera	Vinyl Magic (Italy)
1994	Imaginations	Mellow Records (Italy)
1998	Danzarella	Toast Records (Italy)
1999	Biosfera	Edizione Privata
2002	Alchimie	Toast Records (Italy)
2005	Vento teso	Toast Records (Italy)
2007	Ritmica-mente	Toast Records (Italy)
2010	Preludio ad una nuova alba	Electromantic Music (Italy)
