= Far Away from Conformity =

Studio album by Cadaveria
- Released: January 12, 2004
- Recorded: May – July 2003
- Studio: Capitan Woofer Studio
- Genre: Black metal
- Length: 47:31
- Label: Scarlet Records
- Producer: Cadaveria

Cadaveria chronology
The Shadows' Madame (2002)	Far Away from Conformity (2004)	In Your Blood (2007)

Professional ratings
Review scores
Source	Rating
Allmusic	2/5 stars

Far Away from Conformity is the second full-length album from Cadaveria. The album was recorded at the Capitan Woofer Studios of Saluggia (Vercelli, Italy).

== Track listing ==
No.	Title	Length
1.	"Blood and Confusion"	5:13
2.	"Eleven Three O Three"	4:06
3.	"Irreverent Elegy"	5:10
4.	"The Divine Rapture"	6:38
5.	"Omen of Delirium"	6:10
6.	"Call Me"	3:43
7.	"Out Body Experience"	5:06
8.	"Prayer of Sorrow"	5:30
9.	"Vox of Anti-Time"	5:55

== Personnel ==
- Killer Bob – bass
- Frank Booth – guitar
- Cadaveria – vocals
- Marcelo Santos (a.k.a. Flegias) – drums
