= Sacro Culto =

Studio album by Opera IX
- Released: 1998
- Genre: Symphonic black metal, black-doom, gothic metal
- Length: 70:24
- Label: Shiver Records
- Producer: Opera IX

Opera IX chronology
The Call of the Wood (1995)	Sacro Culto (1998)	The Black Opera: Symphoniæ Mysteriorum in Laudem Tenebrarum (2000)

Sacro Culto is the second studio album by Italian symphonic black metal band Opera IX, released in 1998 through Shiver Records. Beginning with this album, Opera IX started to gradually include elements of gothic metal in their sound.

== Track listing ==
All tracks are written by Opera IX

No.	Title	Length
1.	"The Oak"	10:40
2.	"Fronds of the Ancient Walnut"	12:25
3.	"The Naked and the Dance"	8:20
4.	"Cimmeries"	12:42
5.	"My Devotion"	14:59
6.	"Under the Sign of the Red Dragon"	11:18

== Personnel ==
Opera IX

- Cadaveria (Raffaella Rivarolo) — vocals
- Ossian D'Ambrosio — guitars
- Vlad — bass
- Flegias, a.k.a. Marcelo Santos (Alberto Gaggiotti) — drums
- Lunaris — keyboards

Miscellaneous staff

- Stefano Tappari — sound engineering
- Armin Linke — photography
- Danilo Capua — miniatures and drawings, artwork; cover painting on the Peaceville reissue
- Paola Gaggiotti — graphics
