= Anphisbena =

Studio album by Opera IX
- Released: 2004
- Genres: Black metal, death metal
- Length: 64:27
- Label: Avantgarde Music

Opera IX chronology
| Maleventum (2002) | Anphisbena (2004) |

Professional ratings
Review scores
| Source | Rating |
|---|---|
| Allmusic | 3.5/5 stars |

Anphisbena is the fifth album by Opera IX.

== Track listing ==
| No. | Title | Length |
|---|---|---|
| 1. | "Intro - Many Moons Ago" | 1:38 |
| 2. | "The Serpent Nemeton" | 6:43 |
| 3. | "The Prophecy" | 6:10 |
| 4. | "In Hoc Signo Sanguinis" | 8:31 |
| 5. | "Immortal Chant" | 6:48 |
| 6. | "Scell Lem Duibh" (Song of Death) | 1:59 |
| 7. | "The Sixth Tower" | 4:49 |
| 8. | "Battle Cry" | 10:55 |
| 9. | "Anphisbena" | 7:42 |
| 10. | "One Rode to Asa Bay" (Bathory cover) | 9:12 |
