= Società Anonima Decostruzionismi Organici =

- Also known as: S.A.D.O.
- Origin: Vercelli, Italy
- Genres: Experimental music, avant-rock, free jazz, electronic music
- Years active: 1994–present
- Labels: Banksville Records, AMS/BTF
- Members: Paolo Baltaro; Giuseppe Garavana; Diego Marzi; Daniele Mignone; Thi Ly Procacci; Giovanni Battista Franco
- Past members: Sandro Marinoni; Boris Savoldelli; Andrea Beccaro; Enrico Bricco; Gianni Opezzo; Luigi Ranghino

Società Anonima Decostruzionismi Organici (S.A.D.O.) are an Italian experimental music group formed in Vercelli in 1994. Their work combines improvisation, avant-rock, free jazz, electronics, contemporary composition and sound theatre.

== History ==
S.A.D.O. began as a spin-off of Arcansiel. The original line-up comprised Paolo Baltaro on bass and keyboards, guitarist Gianni Opezzo, drummer Diego Marzi and Sandro Marinoni on tenor saxophone, flute and trombone.

The group released its debut album, Implosioni, in 1994. Recorded at KMP Studio, it was based on musical improvisation, free jazz and timbral experimentation. It was followed in 1995 by Teratoarchetipia, a three-track studio album recorded by Baltaro, Marinoni and Marzi. Recordings made between 1997 and 1999 were later collected on the twelve-track digital album Le Origini (1997–1999), issued in 2025 in two parts.

In the early 2000s the group made La DifferAnza, a work inspired by Jacques Derrida's concept of différance. A remixed tenth-anniversary edition was released as a free download under a Creative Commons licence in 2010. With Boris Savoldelli joining on vocals, S.A.D.O. released Holzwege in 2007. The album's deconstructive approach was conceived in relation to the seven propositions of Ludwig Wittgenstein's Tractatus Logico-Philosophicus.

In 2008 S.A.D.O. contributed to the Carlos Santana tribute album Guitars Dancing in the Light, performing a medley of Jingo, Moonflower and Tales of Kilimanjaro with Magica Aidan. The group won the twelfth “Omaggio a Demetrio Stratos” competition and the Premio Darwin for unconventional Italian music that year.

In 2009 the group released the live album Imprescindibile momento di cultura italiana, recorded at Officine Sonore in Vercelli. The performance deconstructs Italian popular songs including Mille lire al mese, Anima mia, La bambola, Brava and Figli delle stelle, alternating them with monologues by Giovanni Battista Franco about the life and work of Benedetto Croce.

The bilingual double album Weather Underground – A Story of Love and War followed in 2010. The concept album consists of 25 episodes presented in Italian and again in English, with literary and spoken contributions created with Guido Michelone and Franz Krauspenhaar. It takes the human experiences surrounding the American Weather Underground as its narrative point of departure. The production received the 2010 Prog Award for best production in 2011.

In 2011 the track Green Tea at 5 a.m. appeared on the charity compilation Musiche per viaggiatori distratti. The same year S.A.D.O. performed Sconfiggiamo la paura di volare, a work in “sentential form” made with Michelone, in Pavia. In 2013 the group contributed a version of Flaming to More Animals at the Gates of Reason – A Tribute to Pink Floyd.

Digitally distributed in late 2018 and issued physically in 2019, Musiche per signorine da marito – Cura uditiva per la narcolessia in forma sentenziale compresses nine compositions into seven minutes and fifty seconds and repeats the programme in Italian and English. Baltaro composed, produced and recorded the work.

Tanatofobia – Vaccino uditivo contro la paura di morire in forma sentenziale was released in 2023. Produced by Baltaro and Marzi, it comprises eleven short Italian episodes followed by their English-language versions. Its three-stage “sentential form” presents each piece as a sequence of music, an accepted truth and a coercive sentence.

In 2024 the project centred on the imaginary composer Johann Fritz Tannhäuser was presented through concerts and public meetings in Milan and Parma.

The group released Cacofobia – Sanremo 2025 decostruito in 2025. The album applies the sentential form to songs entered in the Sanremo Music Festival 2025 through a process described as “musical dubbing”: the musicians listen to the original songs through headphones and simultaneously re-perform them in a deconstructionist, avant-garde form.

In July 2026 S.A.D.O. released the live album Johann Fritz Tannhäuser: Die wiedergefundenen Meisterwerke. Built around the imaginary composer Johann Fritz Tannhäuser, it documents the “Tannhäuser ritrovato” concert held on 7 November 2025 at the church of San Pietro Martire in Vercelli during the Suoni Diversi series. The work combines composition, improvisation, sound theatre and timbral research.

== Members ==
=== Current members ===
- Paolo Baltaro
- Giuseppe Garavana
- Diego Marzi
- Daniele Mignone
- Thi Ly Procacci
- Giovanni Battista Franco

=== Former members ===
- Sandro Marinoni
- Boris Savoldelli
- Andrea Beccaro
- Enrico Bricco
- Gianni Opezzo
- Luigi Ranghino

== Discography ==
=== Studio albums ===
- Implosioni (Banksville Records, 1994)
- Teratoarchetipia (Banksville Records, 1995)
- La DifferAnza (2001; remixed edition, Banksville Records/Clinical Archives, 2010)
- Holzwege (AMS/BTF-VM2000, 2007)
- Weather Underground – A Story of Love and War, with Guido Michelone and Franz Krauspenhaar (Banksville Records/Audioglobe, 2010)
- Musiche per signorine da marito – Cura uditiva per la narcolessia in forma sentenziale (audiofarmaco) (Banksville Records, 2019; BAA-38178)
- Tanatofobia – Vaccino uditivo contro la paura di morire in forma sentenziale (audiofarmaco) (Banksville Records, 2023; BAA-38179)
- Le Origini (1997–1999) (digital album, 2025)
- Cacofobia – Sanremo 2025 decostruito: cura uditiva della cacofobia in forma sentenziale (Banksville Records, 2025)

=== Live albums ===
- Imprescindibile momento di cultura italiana (AMS/BTF-VM2000, 2009)
- Johann Fritz Tannhäuser: Die wiedergefundenen Meisterwerke (Banksville Classics, 2026; BR04571)

=== Compilation appearances ===
- Guitars Dancing in the Light – A Tribute to Santana (Mellow Records, 2008)
- Musiche per viaggiatori distratti (Banksville Records, 2011)
- More Animals at the Gates of Reason – A Tribute to Pink Floyd (BTF, 2013)
