= Slavia (band) =

Norwegian black metal musical group

- Slavia live in 2009 in Bergen, Norway

Background information
- Also known as: Dreygjarnir (1994–1997)
- Origin: Norway
- Genre: Black metal
- Years active: 1994–2011
- Labels: Drakkar Productions; Misantrof ANTIRecords
- Past members: Jonas Raskolnikov Christiansen; Hoest; Thurzur; Aindiachai m:A Fog

Slavia was a Norwegian black metal band formed as Dreygjarnir in 1994 in Kongsberg, by Jonas Raskolnikov Christiansen. The band changed their name to Slavia in 1997, and were later based in Bergen, where Christiansen attended university. The band's lineup has featured members from Taake, Deathcult, Disiplin, Enslaved and Black Flame.

On 17 November 2011, Christiansen died of colon cancer at age 31. A memorial concert, originally a benefit concert to raise funds for his treatment, took place the following day at Garage in Bergen, and featured sets by Gravdal and Helheim, with Niklas Kvarforth of Shining performing with the former, in addition to a Darkthrone and Satyricon set performed by Nocturno Culto, Satyr, Frost, and Hoest. As the only official member of Slavia, the band's existence ceased with Christiansen's death.

== Band members ==
Former members

- Jonas Raskolnikov Christiansen – vocals, all instruments
- Thurzur – guitar
- Aindiachai – guitar
- Haakon Nikolas Forwald – guitar
- Nattsjel – guitar
- Aquilion – guitar
- Trond Mjøen – guitar
- Dreggen – guitar
- Hoest – bass
- Mr. Roy Kronheim – bass
- Seidemann – bass
- m:A Fog – drums
- Daniel Wakin – drums

Former session members

- Mats Engen – bass

Former live members

- Goatpromoter Lava – guitars, drum programming
- Fordervelse – drums

== Discography ==
Studio albums

- Strength and Vision (2007)
- Integrity and Victory (2011)

Live albums

- Live in Bergen 2007 (2007

EPs

- Norwegian Black Terror Assault (2003)
- Styrke og Visjon (2006)

Demos

- Spectral Fascination (1998)
- Collective Trash (1999)
- Not of This World (1999)
- Gloria in Excelsis Sathan (2001)
- Collective Black Trash (2002)
- Promo 2002 (2002)
- Promofuck 2003 (2003)
- C.O.D. (2004)
