= Banksville Records =

- Parent company: PKMP Communication Group
- Founded: 2005
- Founder: Paolo Baltaro
- Distributor: Audioglobe
- Genre: Various
- Country of origin: Italy, UK
- Location: Vercelli, London
- Official website: www.banksvillerecords.com

Banksville Records is an independent record label based in Vercelli, Italy and London, England.

== Company history ==
Banksville Records is a recording company founded in 2005 by producer Paolo Baltaro. He was awarded as winner of the 12th "Tribute to Demetrio Stratos", the "Darwin award for Italian non-conventional music" in 2008 and, as producer, he was awarded as winner of the 2010 edition of the Prog Award as Best 2010 Production for Weather Underground. Exclusive holder of Rewave System technology. Distribution: Audioglobe

== Signed artists ==
Arcansiel, Endless Pain,Fabrizio Consoli, Mhmm, Società Anonima Decostruzionismi Organici, Toxic Poison, Paolo Baltaro, Terry Dene, Gabriel Delta and the Hurricanes, Maimale, Black Monday, Sorella Maldestra, Cesare Bardelli, Sandro Marinoni
