= No Strange =

Italian band

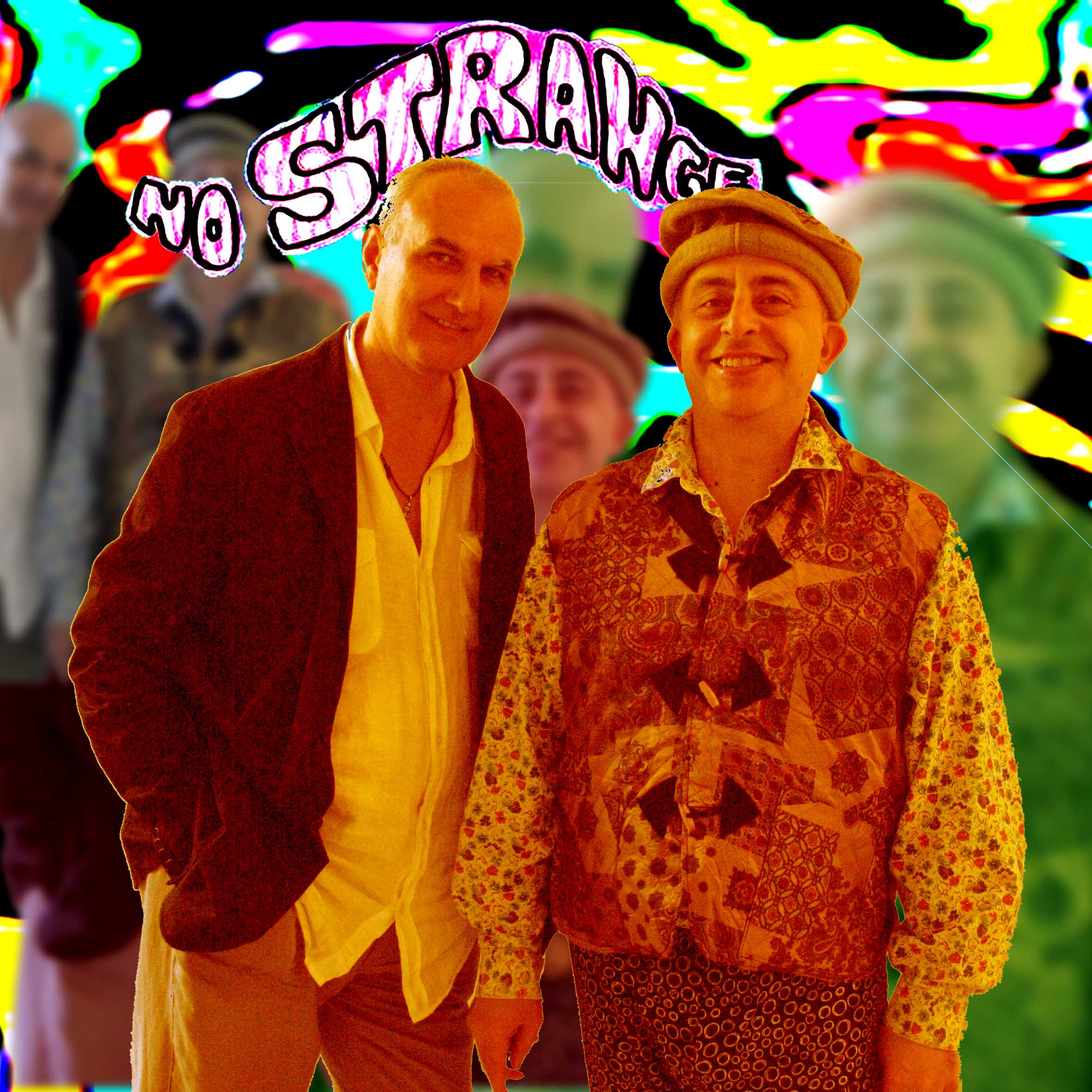
- Alberto Ezzu and Salvatore D'Urso, members of the musical group no Strange (2013)

Background information
- Origin: Turin, Italy
- Genre: Psychedelic rock
- Years active: 1980 today
- Labels: Toast Records https://www.areapirata.com/, https://www.psychoutrecords.com/
- Members: Salvatore D'Urso (vocals), Alberto Ezzu (guitar/vocals, keyboards, sitar)
- Website: http://www.toastit.com http://www.albertoezzu.net/NoStrange.html

No Strange was an Italian rock group influenced by psychedelic music that combined elements of rock and cosmic music. The group was born in 1980 in Turin with the name of No Strani, on the initiative of Salvatore D'Urso (better known as Ursus) and Alberto Ezzu.

In 1984, the collaboration with the producer and record producer Giulio Tedeschi of Toast Records began. These years also saw the production of the tapes Rainbow (self-produced, 1983) Lysergic Tomahawk (Roller coaster Italy, 1984) and the participation in the 1985 compilation Eighties Colors edited by Claudio Sorge and published by Electric Eye. Also in 1985, their first self-titled album was released[1].

In addition to D'Urso and Ezzu, many other musicians will alternate over time, including Franco "Franz" Presutti, Gilberto Richiero, Loris Canalia and Antonio "Tony" D'Urso[1].

The band has always favored study activity and musical research. Live appearances have been rare. Preferably on special occasions, such as the "Bom Shankar Event" held in La Loggia (Turin) on 20 March 1988, performed with Laura Tommasi on wind instruments and Sandro Becchis on guitar, the recording of which was published in the compilation Oracolo[1]. With the entry into the band of Lucio Molinari, percussionist, and his brother Pino Molinari on keyboards, No strange will also record the album "Flora di Romi" released at the beginning of 1991.

The group ends its regular activity in 1993[1], to reform in the spring of 2008, with the participation of Salvatore "Ursus" D'Urso, Alberto Ezzu, Pino Molinari, Lucio Molinari, Tony D'Urso, Laura Tommasi and Paolo Avataneo. In practice a fusion between the different formations that operated in the eighties to which the backing vocalist Rosalba Guastella was later added.

In November 2011 Cristalli Sognanti was released in double format (digital and analog).

In 2014, Armonia Vivente was released on a double CD and double LP, again for the Area Pirata and Psychout Rec record companies.

In June 2015, the 10-inch 33 rpm Universi e Trasparenze was released, in which the band paid homage to some names and groups that have inspired them over the years: Popol Vuh, The Nice, Le Stelle di Mario Schifano, Terry Riley and La Monte Young. Change in the live line-up with the addition of Matteo Martino to the synthesizer and sampling. In May 2017, Alberto Ezzu, Salvatore D'Urso "Ursus" and Fabrizio Della Porta published the book "No Strange e Sogni Correlati" for Area Pirata. Artists, musicians and poets of various nationalities and from different eras take part in the volume, to reconnect a common path starting from the 60s, up to the present. The central theme of psychedelia also passes through languages such as comics and graphic composition.

At the end of 2017 the new work on vinyl "Il Sentiero delle Tartarughe" is released, again for the record companies Area Pirata and Psychout Rec., with the new three-piece formation to which the contralto Paola Scatena is added on vocals.

Another LP in 2019, again for the record companies Area Pirata and Psychout Rec., "Mutter der Erde", dedicated to Jutta Nienhaus, with the four-piece formation, Alberto Ezzu, Salvatore D'Urso "Ursus", Matteo Martino and Paola Scatena with some notable collaborations, including the singer of Armenian origin Rita Tekeyan, the singer/performer Simona Colonna, the violinist Stefania Priotti, the bassist Riccardo Salvini and the drummer Gabriele Maggiorotto. Meanwhile, still in 2019, two more works by Ezzu are released with two of his parallel projects: Alberto Ezzu Lux Vocal Ensemble "L'Uscita delle Anime verso la Luce dl Giorno" in LP for Psychout Rec.; and a new work with the newly formed ensemble AlmaMantra, with Alberto Ezzu on vocals and various instruments, Anna Siccardi soprano and flutes, Stefania Priotti on viella and Paola Scatena contralto and percussion. Repertoire of medieval music revisited in a meditative key for the record company His Sunt Leones.

In 2021 the LP "…e continuarò ad esistere" is released again with the record companies Area Pirata and Psychout Rec. The absence of Matteo Martino, busy with other solo electronic projects, and the increasingly important collaboration of the singer Paola Scatena is noticeable on the album.

In 2022 Alberto Ezzu's solo work "Quaderno delle Poesie Elettroniche Ultraterrene" was printed in double CD containing only electronic music, for Rubber Soul Records Turin. In 2023 the double CD "Universi, Sovrapposizioni e Risonanze" was printed, which contains four unreleased tracks in addition to the 10" Universi e Trasparenze, the LP Il Sentiero delle Tartarughe and the LP Mutter der Erde, previously released only on vinyl.

In October 2023 Alberto Ezzu, again for Rubber Soul Records Turin, published a CD together with the singer, cellist and flautist Simona Colonna which is entitled "Le Vie Dei Canti" and is Ezzu's first work other than No Strange in which songs appear.

On November 4, 2024 the vinyl "Chiedilo a te stesso" was released with the lineup that includes, in addition to the historic Alberto Ezzu and Salvatore D'Urso "Ursus", Paola Scatena on contralto vocals and Simona Colonna on flute and cello. On the B side of the LP a Renaissance organ recorded in a Piedmontese church.

In May 2025, the record company Onde Italiane (www.ondeitaliane.it) released a 45 rpm from the "No Strani" period (1981). The album contains three songs composed and played by Alberto Ezzu and Salvatore D'Urso: 1) Psycho Dream; 2) Dance Joy; 3) Uomo scimmia. Also in 2025 and again for Onde Italiane, "Demos 1983" was released, an LP that collects songs released on the cassette attached to the fanzine "Roller Coaster" and on the cassette "In-formazioni".

In July 2026, the double LP *Il Sogno di Prometeo* by Alberto Ezzu will be released on Psychout Rec. It is a work for solo organ derived from the 2022 installation *L'Antro dell'Eterno Ritorno del Diverso*, which has expanded over time to include numerous subsections.

== Discography ==
=== Demo Tapes ===
Year	Title	Etichetta
1983	Rainbow	Autoproduction
1984	Lisergic tomahawk	Roller coaster Italy

=== Albums ===
Year	Title	Etichetta
1985	Trasparenze e suoni	Toast Records Italy
1987	L'Universo	Toast Records Italy
1991	Flora di Romi	Toast Records Italy
2011	Cristalli Sognanti	Psychout Rec. Italy
2014	Armonia Vivente - tra analogie e contrasti (double LP)	Psychout Rec. Italy
2015	Universi e Trasparenze (10")	Psychout Rec. - Area Pirata Italy
2017	Il Sentiero delle Tartarughe	Psychout Rec. - Area Pirata Italy
2019	Mutter der Erde	Psychout Rec. - Area Pirata Italy
2021	...e continuerò ad esistere	Psychout Rec. - Area Pirata Italy
2024	Chiedilo a te stesso	Psychout Rec. - Area Pirata Italy
2025	Demos 1983	Onde Italiane Italy

=== Singles ===
Year	Title	Etichetta
1986	White bird/Fiori risplendenti	Toast Records Italy
2025	No Strani	Onde Italiane Italy

=== CDs ===
Year	Title	Etichetta
1998	Medusa	Toast Records Italy
2011	Cristalli Sognanti	Area Pirata Italy
2014	Armonia Vivente - tra analogie e contrasti (double CD)	Area Pirata Italy
2023	Universi, Sovrapposizioni e Risonanze (double CD with 4 unreleased songs and the 10" Universi e Trasparenze + LP Il Sentiero delle Tartarughe + LP Mutter der Erde)	Area Pirata Italy & Psych-Out Records

=== Albums Compilation ===
Year	Title	Etichetta
1985	Eighties colours	Electric eye Italy
1987	What exactly is a joke	Vinile/Crazy Mennequin Italy
1988	Oracolo	Toast Records Italy
1993	Who are them?	Face Records Italy
1993	Apocalisse di diamante	Toast Records Italy
2022	Le Forbici di Manitù & Friends INCREDIBILE?!	2LP / 2 CD, Sussidiaria Italy

=== CDs Compilation ===
Year	Title	Etichetta
2006	Electric Psychedelic Sitar Headswirlers Vol 9	Purple Lantern Usa
2012	Welcome Back to the Eighties Colours	Psychout Rec.
2012	HOFMANN'S KALEIDOSCOPE: Expiation of the Psychedelic Hunters Vol. I	Vincebus Eruptum fanzine n°14
2022	Le Forbici di Manitù & Friends INCREDIBILE?! con il brano "C'è una musica"	Sussidiaria

== Side project ==
=== Alberto Ezzu Lux Vocal Ensemble ===
Year	Title	Etichetta
2006	CD Consonanze armoniche, Ostinati Ritmici e Veri Bordoni Immobili	Cooperativa Primainsieme Italy
2011	LP Consonanze armoniche, Ostinati Ritmici e Veri Bordoni Immobili (double LP - 3 bonus tracks )	Psychout Rec.
2013	CD Il Fuoco del 6° Armonico sulla Luce della Dominante partendo dalla Madre Fondamentale (con in mente Zarathustra)	Hic Sunt Leones e Arte, Cura e Trasformazione
2017	CD Le Litanie di Ra	Hic Sunt Leones
2019	LP L'Uscita delle Anime verso la Luce del Giorno	Psychout Rec.

=== AlmaMantra ===
Anno	Titolo	Etichetta
2019	CD AlmaMantra	Hic Sunt Leones

=== Alberto Ezzu ===
Anno	Titolo	Etichetta
2022	CD ALBERTO EZZU: Quaderno delle Poesie Elettroniche Ultraterrene	Rubber Soul Records Torino
2023	CD SIMONA COLONNA e ALBERTO EZZU: Le Via Dei Canti	Rubber Soul Records Torino
2026	LP ALBERTO EZZU: Il Sogno di Prometeo	PsychOut Rec.

==== Alberto Ezzu Lux Vocal Ensemble ====
It was psychedelia in the beginning. Since the 1970s Ezzu has been following the same dream, the dream of his own generation to expand the borders of the mind. Through the years he has never given up that quest, even though things have changed and today he can say with Socrates "know yourself". He has consistently followed his path going through all kind of music and sound experiences. "No Strange" experience was "something absolutely original" and it stood apart in the Neo psychedelic Italian scene whose interest was in the sound but also in the hair-cut and clothes of British and American bands of the 1960s and 1970s. No Strange benchmarks included the first Pink Floyd, Brainticket, Soft Machine and Third Ear Band but mainly the early works of Tangerine Dream and Popol Vuh, with whom they shared a common musical and spiritual quest. Twenty years later this new Ezzu project is inspired by the same love for sound, for the winding paths of thought, for the possibility of human mind. His way has changed because his life and his work have changed. After years of Zen meditation he has dedicated himself to music therapy and became a professional therapist. The Benenzon Model and its concept of helping relation has given the possibility to compare his mind, his thoughts and feelings with the mind, the thoughts and feelings of other people –being them patients or colleagues- and to constantly check himself and his progress in a sound filled environment. "Consonanze Armoniche, Ostinati Ritmici e Veri Bordoni Immobili» lives in the stream of popular and learned drone music and of avant-garde music which gets its inspiration into American Minimalism of authors like La Monte Young and Terry Riley, and also Alvin Curran and the duo Cuni-Durand which is particularly influential for Ezzu who studied Dhrupad singing with Amelia Cuni. The study of multi-note singing –whose tradition origins in Siberia Mongolia and Tibet- completes Ezzu's technical background and gives to his style a personal and unique sound. In this work as in his previous "Il Fuoco del 6° Armonico sulla Luce della Dominante partendo dalla Madre Fondamentale – con in mente Zarathustra" (performed live but still not released) the sound is both avant-garde and ancient, primeval as if generated by the early wave motion of the Big Bang. The synphonia (a forefather of hurdy-gurdy with wheel stricken strings) played by Ezzu, the bass viola da gamba and the lute played by Raffaela Gottardelli e Guido Montegrandi in two out of four compositions in the CD, create a modal frame in which the solo singers weave delicate sound textures like slow spirals of incense smoke fading in the air. The first track, an Indian harmonium solo, and the final vocal duo with the Sicilian Maestro Raffaele Schiavo introduce and reshape the modal core stating and twisting it into an intangible –but dense and physical- intimacy. Music seems to graze an inner landscape of a deep and unsaid land. Maestri of harmonic singing like Marco Garri (a David Hykes student), Alberto Guccione (author of the CD-book Canto Armonico, Red Edizioni), and Raffaele Schiavo alternate short melodies to the long drones of the harmonic choir performed by Marco Buccolo (musicologist and composer), Pino Poclen, Rosella Lancina e Massimo Amelio the original members and backbone of the Ensemble. A recording out of time, suspended in a slow and almost unreal but constant flowing. The first hundred copies, numbered and signed by Ezzu himself, are wrapped into fabric folders made by the quilt maker Raffaella Gottardelli – they will probably become collector's items as it is the first record by No Strange (transparent vinyl with a transparent and coloured cover). The Centro Musicoterapia Benenzon Italia presents this recording as part of its editorial policy. Together with the book Introduzione alla Musicoterapia by Ezzu - Messaglia, the proceedings of the II Convegno Internazionale "Musica tra Neuroscienze, Arte e Terapia", the CD by Alberto Ezzu Lux Vocal and Instrumental Ensemble testifies the work done by the Centro in the teaching of multi-note singing to music therapist but also to musician and people who are interested into this technique.
