= Mortuary Drape =

Italian black metal band

- Origin: Italy
- Genres: Black metal
- Years active: 1986–present
- Members: Wildness Perversion; D.C. S.R. S.C. M.T.
- Website: www.mortuary13drape.com

Mortuary Drape is an Italian black metal band formed in 1986. They have released six albums.

They played at the Prague Death Mass festival in 2023.

== Band Members ==
Current

- Wildness Perversion - Vocals (1990-present), Drums (1986–1996, 2009-2010)
- D.C. - Guitars (2010-present)
- S.R. - Guitars (2010-Present)
- S.C. - Bass (2010-present)
- M.T. - Drums (2019-present)

Former

- Without Name - Bass (1986-1990, 1997-2001), Vocals (1986-1990; died 2023)
- Witch - Guitars (1986-1987)
- The Alchemist - Guitars (1986-1987)
- Wisdom Reaper - Guitars
- The Undead - Guitars
- Wicked Angel - Guitars (1989-1991)
- Diabolic Obsession - Bass (1992-1997)
- Maniac of Sacrifice - Guitars (1992-1997)
- Old Necromancer - Guitars (1994-1997)
- Nequam - Drums (1996-1997)
- Left Hand Preacher - Bass (1999-2001), Backing Vocals (1999-2003), Guitars (2001-2003)
- I.O.R.R. Will Revealed - Drums (2000)
- Demon Shadow - Guitars (2000)
- Roaming Soul - Guitars (2000), Backing Vocals (2000)
- Arcane of Veiled Light - Bass (2001-2009), Backing Vocals (2001-2009)
- War Machine Helgast - Drums (2001-2006), Backing Vocals (2001-2006)
- Seeker of the Unknown - Guitars (2001-2003)
- Cruel Abbot - Guitars (2003-2004)
- Matt - Drums (2007-2012)
- Abysmal Wizard - Guitars (2008-2009)
- M.R. - Drums (2011-2012)

== Discography ==
=== Studio Albums ===
Year	Title	Label
1994	All the Witches Dance	Unisound Records
1997	Secret Sudaria	Nazgul's Eyrie Productions
2000	Tolling 13 Knell	Avantgarde Music
2004	Buried in Time	Avantgarde Music
2014	Spiritual Independence	Iron Tyrant
2023	Black Mirror	Peaceville

=== Extended Plays ===
Year	Title	Label
1992	Into The Drape	Decapitated Records
1996	Mourn Path	Shivadarshana Records
2011	Black Flames of Blasphemy	Iron Tyrant
2022	Wisdom - Vibration - Repent	Peaceville

=== Demos ===
Year	Title
1987	Necromacy
1989	Doom Return

=== Split Albums ===
Year	Title	Label	Notes
2013	In the Eerie Cold, Where All the Witches Dance	Primitive Art Records	Split with Shining
2015	Dance of Spirits / Ordo Equilibrium Nox	Funeral Industries	Split with Necromass

== Tours ==
- Northern Continental Tour with Volahn, 2018
