= Toast Records =

Independent record label based in Turin, Italy

- Founded: 1985
- Founder: Giulio Tedeschi, Carla Celsa
- Genre: Various
- Country of origin: Italy
- Official website: www.toastit.com

Toast Records is an independent record label based in Turin, Italy.

== Company history ==
Toast Records is a recording company founded in 1985 by producer Giulio Tedeschi and operated by Italian Rock. It all started in 1979 in a very “underground” style. The city of Turin saw and witnessed the birth of Meccano Records. The initial idea was to promote the Righeira project. In spring 1985, out of Meccano Records, sprang Toast sas soon to become Toast Records a project that would make history in the Italian independent musical scene. First title to be produced (summer 1985): "Trasparenze e suoni" by No Strange.

== Partial list albums released ==
=== Vinyl ===
Year	Artist	Title
1985	No Strange	Trasparenze e suoni
1986	Carl Lee & The Rhythm Rebels	Carl Lee & The Rhythm Rebels
1987	No Strange	L'universo
1988	Afterhours	All the Good Children Go to Hell
1988	Statuto	Vacanze
1989	No Strange, Afterhours, Max Casacci, Ghigo Agosti and others	Oracolo (album)
1989	Vegetable Men	It's time to change
1989	Statuto	Senza di lei
1993	Barbieri	Mondi diversi
1994	Fleurs du Mal	Indian-world

=== CDs ===
Year	Artist	Title
1995	Fleurs du Mal	3
1997	Alma Mater	Il Parco Degli Arcobaleni
1998	No Strange	Medusa
1998	Marcello Capra	Danzarella
1999	Steve Sperguenzie & the Incredible Lysergic Ants	5 Investigators
2002	Karmablue	Erratico Estatico
2004	Roulette Cinese	Che fine ha fatto Baby Love
2007	Trenincorsa	La Danza dei sogni
2009	Jambalaya	Quando vola lo struzzo
