= Janvs =

Italian black metal band

- Origin: Genoa, Liguria, Italy
- Genres: Black metal Progressive black metal Melodic black metal Post metal
- Years active: 2004–present
- Labels: Pagan Moon Records; Aeternitas Tenebrarum Music; ATMF
- Members: Matteo "Vinctor" Barelli; Claudio "Malphas" Fogliato; Massimo "m:A Fog" Altomare
- Past members: Francesco La Rosa
- Website: www.janvs.it/

Janvs is a progressive black metal band from Genova, Italy. The band take their name from the Roman god Janus. They're known for using a Latin style of spelling in their band name and song/album names by replacing the letter "U" with the letter "V" (hence how Janus is spelled Janvs instead).

== History ==
Janvs began in 2004 with Matteo Barelli on vocals/guitar, Claudio Fogliato on bass, and Francesco La Rosa on drums. They released their debut album Nigredo on September 1, 2004, limited to a hand-numbered 88 total copies. Their next album did not come until 2007. Titled Fvlgvres, the album is a concept album about "the shattering of human limits and condition, upon the longing and the temporary conquest of real moments of awareness and contact with the peaks of transcendence". The band released a song called "Pietas I" on a sampler called B.M.I.A. Compilation. In 2008 the band's original drummer, Francesco, left the group. He was replaced by respected Italian drummer Massimo Altomare, making Janvs one of the many musical projects he became a part of. The band has also been covered in well-known metal magazines, such as Terrorizer (even having a controversy with each other) and Decibel. They have been described as being musically akin to bands such as Ulver.

== Members ==
=== Current members ===
- Matteo "Vinctor" Barelli – vocals, guitar, keyboards, programming
- Claudio "Malphas" Fogliato – bass guitar
- Massimo "m:A Fog" Altomare – drums

=== Former members ===
- Francesco La Rosa – drums, keyboards, samples

== Discography ==
- Nigredo (2004; reissued in 2014)
- Fvlgvres (2007)
- Vega (2008)
