= Massimo Altomare =

Italian heavy metal musician

m:A Fog
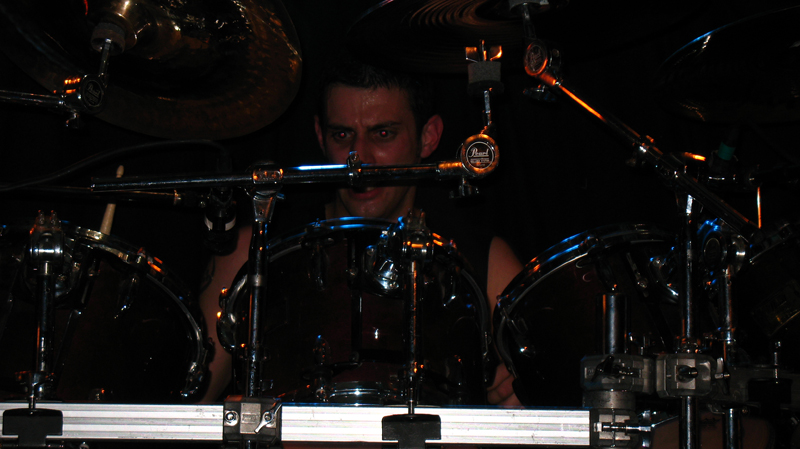
- m:A Fog in 2007

Background information
- Born: Massimo Altomare; 27 November 1979 (age 46)
- Origin: Italy
- Genres: Black metal
- Instrument: drums
- Years active: 1995-present
- Member of: Black Flame; Janvs
- Formerly of: Slavia; Dead to This World; Opera IX
- Website: Black Flame Official Website

m:A Fog (born November 27, 1979, in Turin, Italy as Massimo Altomare) is a heavy metal musician.

== Biography and formation of Black Flame ==
m:A Fog is primarily recognized as the drummer of the black metal band Black Flame, which he co-founded in 1998. Black Flame were the first band to be signed by Forces of Satan Records in 2006, the label run by Infernus, guitarist of the Norwegian Black Metal band Gorgoroth. m:A Fog is also known for being a popular session drummer, often recording albums and doing concerts outside his primary band. Although he is not believed to be a principal songwriter, his influence can be heard on every record he has participated on. He is known for being a powerful and "straight forward" drummer, choosing not to use a big range of patterns, but choosing instead to play in the most direct way possible. His style is often remarked upon in reviews or interviews, and many younger drummers quote him as an influence. He grew up in the countryside outside Turin (Italy), but now he lives outside of Italy, and keeps his lifestyle as private as he can.

== Participation with Norwegian bands: Disiplin, Slavia, Dead to This World ==
In 2004, m:A Fog was selected by Gorgoroth in order to be auditioned for their 2004 European and South American Tour. Although he didn't get the place in the line-up, who was picked up by Dirge Rep (ex Enslaved, Gehenna, Orcustus), m:A Fog got the chance to be known in the Norwegian Black Metal Scene. Through this connection, m:A Fog was auditioned in 2005 by Disiplin - at that time one of the rising names in Norwegian scene and one of the bands produced by Moonfog Productions, label ran by Satyr the frontman of the band Satyricon. With Disiplin, m:A Fog performed at the 2006 edition of the Inferno Festival in Oslo. The Line up of the band was completed by members of Myrkskog and Slavia. In 2007 Disiplin were disbanded and Jonas Raskolnikov Christiansen, vocalist of both Disiplin and Slavia invited m:A Fog to join Slavia permanently as drummer, together with Hoest at bass guitar (from Taake), Aindiachaí at guitars (from Taake) and Thurzur (from Taake) at guitars. m:A Fog performed at the 2007 edition of the Hole in the Sky festival in Bergen among many others live appearances. After the death of Slavia singer Jonas Raskolnikov Christiansen, occurred on 17 November 2011, Slavia ceased to exist. m:A Fog participated in the farewell concert, that took place in Bergen on 18 November 2011. A documentary of that night has been released to the press, with interview contributions from m:A Fog, Satyr and Frost from Satyricon, Gaahl from Wardruna and Nocturno Culto from Darkthrone. The latest Norwegian band in which m:A Fog took part is Dead To This World, formed by the ex Immortal bass player Iscariah, that in Dead To This World takes the role of guitarist/vocalist and main composer. The line up of this band is completed by Thurzur (from Taake) at bass guitar and Skyggen (also session in Gorgoroth, ex Thunderbolt) at guitar.

== Other bands and session work ==
In March, 2008, m:A Fog joined the ranks of the Italian band Janvs and in May, 2008, he recorded their album Vega. m:A Fog always considered Janvs as a full-time commitment and after a long hiatus, Janvs emerged back in 2012 appearing in a tribute to the Norwegian band Enslaved with the cover of "793 (The Battle of Lindisfarne)" taken from the album Eld. In the same cover, the Enslaved founder and guitarist Ivar Bjørnson participated with a guitar track. Janvs also announced the release of a new album, with m:A Fog at drums, for 2014. This new album will be released by Avantgarde Music.

m:A Fog recorded in 2007 the second album of the French band Glorior Belli, entitled "Manifesting the Raging Beast" and released in the same year by the Americal Label Southern Lord. He also appeared in the second album of the Italian band Hate Profile, he appeared on two tracks of the 2009 album Worship or Die by the Italian band Hiems, on the tracks "Scum Destroyer" and the Gun/Judas Priest cover "Race with the Devil".

m:A Fog also participated in a hard rock band called Warnipples, that features members of Highlord and White Skull. He recorded two demos and the album "Hangover Tunes", released in 2011. The band appears to be disbanded nowadays.

In 2008, m:A Fog formed Concilium Antichristi with Dk. Deviant from the French band Arkhon Infaustus. Although a Myspace profile was launched, with demo tracks, the band never released any further material.

In late October 2014, m:A Fog joined Opera IX. He has left the band in 2020.

In the summer of 2016, m:A Fog re-recorded the drum tracks of Swedish band Azelisassath's "Total Desecration of existence" album, released in 2017 by the label Avantgarde Music.

In 2021, the Norwegian Black Metal band Taake released the compilation “Avvik”, in which m:A Fog is credited on drums in the Darkthrone cover “Ravnajuv”. The same track appears in the split “Jaertegn” with the Norwegian band Deathcult and released by Edged Circle Productions.

As of 2022, m:A Fog is listed as drummer of the Swiss band Totenheer and as well for the Italian band Impious Vesper.

== Equipment ==
m:A Fog has always been reluctant to list equipment in interviews. It is known that in May, 2008, m:A Fog become the first Italian drummer to be signed as endorser for the American percussion factory Trick Drums.

In December 2014, through Opera IX official Facebook page, and through Soultone Cymbals official website it has been released a statement regarding m:A Fog new endorsement deal with the American factory Soultone Cymbals.

As of April 2019, the polish double pedals manufacturer Czarcie Kopyto lists Massimo Altomare in their Artists roster.

== Bands ==
=== Current ===
- Black Flame (1998–present), based in Italy
- Totenheer (2022-present), based in Switzerland
- Impious Vesper (2022-present), based in Italy

=== On hiatus ===
- Janvs (2008–present), based in Italy
- Hate Profile (2008–present), based in Italy

=== Former ===
- Daemusinem (2000–2002), based in Italy
- Dead to This World (2008–2015), based in Norway
- Disiplin (2005–2007), based in Norway
- Slavia (2006–2011), based in Norway
- Glorior Belli (2006–2008), based in France
- Concilium Antichristi (2008–?), based in France
- Opera IX (2014–2020), based in Italy

== Discography ==
Year	Title	Band
1997	Demo	Allost
2001	Welcome (Demo)	Black Flame
2002	Daemusinem Domine Empire	Daemusinem
2002	Orgiastic Funeral (Demo)	Black Flame
2002	From Ashes I'll Reborn 7"	Black Flame
2003	The Third Revelation	Black Flame
2003	Promo 2003 (Demo)	Lymph of Wisdoom
2004	Winds of Flagellation (Compilation)	Black Flame
2004	Black Celtic Summit (Compilation)	Black Flame
2004	Torment & Glory	Black Flame
2006	Conquering Purity	Black Flame
2007	Promo 2007 (Demo)	Warnipples
2007	BMIA Compilation	Black Flame
2007	Manifesting the raging Beast	Glorior Belli
2008	Imperivm	Black Flame
2008	Vega	Janvs
2008	Gasoline Rock Motherfuckers (Demo)	Warnipples
2008	Strength and Vision (Expanded edition)	Slavia
2009	Worship or Die	Hiems
2011	Sacrifice (EP)	Dead to this World
2011	Hangover Tunes	Warnipples
2011	Septem	Black Flame
2012	Önd - A Tribute to Enslaved	Janvs & Ivar Bjornson
2013	Opus II - The Soul Proceeds	Hate Profile
2014	Nigredo	Janvs
2015	Back to Sepulcro	Opera IX
2016	Reborn from pain: a new understanding	Odaltyr
2017	Total Desecration of Existence	Azelisassath
2018	The Gospel	Opera IX
2019	Necrogenesis: Chants from the Grave	Black Flame
2020	Jaertegn (EP)	Taake
2021	Avvik (Compilation)	Taake
2024	The Negative Aura (EP)	Black Flame
2025	Memoria Mortuorum	Impious Vesper
