= Cadaveria =

Italian musician

- Born: Raffaella Rivarolo; 31 May 1972 (age 54); Turin, Italy
- Genres: Symphonic black metal; black-doom; gothic metal; industrial metal
- Occupations: Singer; musician; songwriter
- Instruments: Vocals, keyboards
- Years active: 1992–present
- Labels: Scarlet; Season of Mist; Bakerteam Records; Black Tears of Death Records; Triple Silence (Salvation)
- Website: www.cadaveria.com

Cadaveria, real name Raffaella Rivarolo (born 31 May 1972), is an Italian musician and one of the first women to enter the extreme metal scene in the early 1990s, as former vocalist and keyboard player of symphonic black metal band Opera IX.

== Biography ==
Cadaveria was born in Turin, Italy, on 31 May 1972. She joined symphonic black metal band Opera IX in 1992, of which she was the vocalist and keyboard player until 2001, when she left the band with bandmate Alberto "Flegias" Gaggiotti (also a member of extreme metal act Necrodeath) to form a new project.

In April 2001, Cadaveria and Flegias (using the pseudonym Marçelo Santos) founded the band CADAVERIA. The name of the band is written in all capitals to distinguish it from the vocalist's name. Shortly after, Killer Bob (bass), Frank Booth (guitar), and Baron Harkonnen (keyboards) joined the group. Except Cadaveria, the band members' pseudonyms are taken from antagonists from movies by American filmmaker David Lynch.

CADAVERIA's debut album, The Shadows' Madame, came out in 2002, released through Scarlet Records. It would be followed by 2004's Far Away from Conformity, also on Scarlet Records. In 2007, the band signed with Season of Mist and released the third full-length album, In Your Blood. The fourth album, Horror Metal, was announced in late 2010 and released in January 2012 through Bakerteam Records.

In 2011, Cadaveria provided additional vocals for Theatres des Vampires' song "Le Grand Guignol", off their album Moonlight Waltz. Marçelo Santos worked with Theatres des Vampires in 2005, providing additional vocals for the track "Forever in Death", off their album Pleasure and Pain.

On 7 July 2014, Cadaveria announced that they were working on the band's fifth studio album, Silence. It was released on 18 November 2014 through Scarlet Records. The album's first single, "Carnival of Doom", was released on 23 October 2014 via iTunes as a teaser. A music video for the track "Strangled Idols" was uploaded to Cadaveria's official YouTube channel on 30 June 2015.

On 2 September 2016, CADAVERIA released the Mondoscuro split album with Necrodeath, through Black Tears of Death Records.

Cadaveria is also the vocalist of industrial metal band DyNAbyte.

In the summer of 2018, Cadaveria announced she had been diagnosed with breast cancer, and was undergoing treatment.

== Discography ==
=== With Opera IX ===
- 1992: Demo '92 (demo tape)
- 1993: The Triumph of the Death (7-inch EP)
- 1995: The Call of the Wood
- 1998: Sacro Culto
- 2000: The Black Opera: Symphoniæ Mysteriorum in Laudem Tenebrarum

=== With CADAVERIA ===
- 2002: The Shadows' Madame
- 2004: Far Away from Conformity
- 2007: In Your Blood
- 2012: Horror Metal
- 2014: Silence
- 2016: Mondoscuro (split with Necrodeath)
- 2022: Emptiness

=== With DyNAbyte ===
- 2004: Extreme Mental Piercing
- 2010: 2KX

== Band members ==
=== Current members ===
- Raffaella Rivarolo aka Cadaveria – vocals (2001–present)
- Alberto Gaggiotti aka Marçelo Santos – drums (2001–present)
- Cristian Scarponi aka Dick Laurent – guitars (2009–present)
- Gianluca Fontana aka Peter Dayton – bass (2015–present)

=== Former members ===
- Davide Queirolo aka Killer Bob – bass (2001–2015)
- Stefano Tappari aka Frank Booth – guitars (2001–2016)
- LJ Dusk aka Baron Harkonnen – keyboards (2001–2003)

Timeline
