= Opera IX =

Italian symphonic black metal band

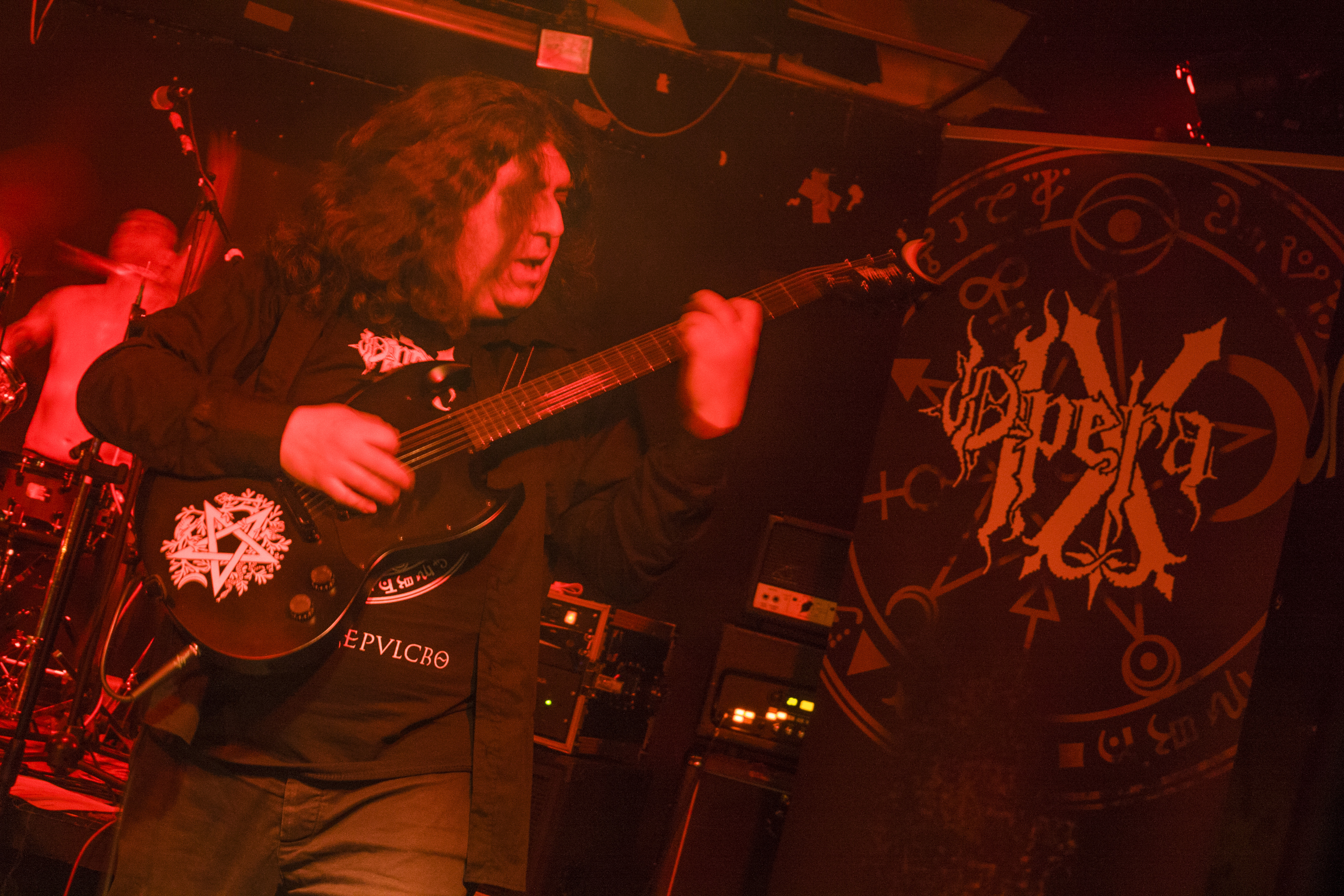
- Ossian on stage in 2015

Background information
- Origin: Biella, Italy
- Genres: Symphonic black metal, gothic metal (early)
- Years active: 1988–present
- Labels: Avantgarde Music, Displeased Records
- Members: Dipsas; Ossian; Charon m:A Fog; Alessandro
- Past members: Cadaveria; Flegias; Lunaris; Taranis; Madras; Vlad; Silent Bard; Triskent; Dalamar; M. Abigail; Scùrs
- Website: operaix.it

Opera IX is an Italian symphonic black metal band, founded in Biella by guitarist Ossian in 1988.

== History ==
=== Early years: 1990–1995 ===
In 1990, the band made the demo tape Gothik. After many line-up changes, they settled with singer Cadaveria, Ossian on guitar, bassist Vlad, and drummer Flegias. The band switched from an early occult metal sound to a mix of gothic, death, and black metal. The second, four-song demo led to a contract for a 7-inch EP that came out in 1993. The first 500 copies sold out in two months. In the meantime, the band filmed The Triumph Of The Death, containing the videos Born In The Grave and The Red Death.

At the end of 1993, classically trained keyboard player Silent Bard joined the line-up. The band released its first album, The Call of the Wood, in 1995 on Miscarriage Records. The five-song album runs for about 60 minutes. After the CD release, Opera IX replaced the keyboard player with Triskent.

Opera IX participated the A Call To Irons Iron Maiden tribute album on Miscarriage Records. The band covered "The Rime Of The Ancient Mariner". Other bands on the album included Vital Remains and Absu.

=== Sacro Culto and The Black Opera: 1996–2001 ===
Belgian label Shiver Records released the band's second album, the six-song, 70-minute Sacro Culto, in April 1998. Lunaris played keyboards on the album. The CD came out in digipak format, A video was made for "Fronds of the Ancient Walnut".

In 2000, Opera IX signed to Avantgarde Music. In January of the following year, they recorded their third album, The Black Opera - Simphoniae Misteriorum in Laude Tenebrarum, at the Underground studios in Sweden. Black Opera sold approximately 18,000 copies. In September 2001, Avantgarde released a remastered The Call of the Wood with new cover artwork and bonus tracks "Rimes About Dying Stones" and "Born In The Grave".

=== Maleventum and Anphisbena: 2002–2008 ===
Flegias and Cadaveria left the band to form Cadaveria. Opera IX reformed with drummer Taranis and singer Madras. Their fourth album, Maleventum, is a concept album about witchcraft and paganism. It was recorded in January 2002 at The Damage inc studios in Ventimiglia.

Madras and Taranis left the band at the same time it was finishing the new album Anphisbena. In December 2003, the Opera IX line up featured singer M The Bard and drummer Dalamar.

=== New albums 2009–present ===
The band recorded an album and planned to release it sometime in the beginning of 2011 on Displeased Records. Dalamar, Vlad, and Ossian completed recording drums, bass, and guitar, respectively. The band posted two video previews of the album on YouTube. On 15 April 2011, the band left Displeased Records because the label "would no longer guarantee the conditions in the signed contract". Shortly thereafter, the band signed with Agonia Records. A music video for the song Mandragora was released.

Strix: Maledictae in aeternum was released in 2012, followed by Back to Sepulcro in 2015.

== Discography ==
=== Studio albums ===
- The Call of the Wood (1995)
- Sacro Culto (1998)
- The Black Opera: Symphoniae Mysteriorum in Laudem Tenebrarum (2000)
- Maleventum (2002)
- Anphisbena (2004)
- Strix: Maledictae in aeternum (2012)
- Back to Sepulcro (2015)
- The Gospel (2018)

=== Extended plays ===
- The Triumph of the Death (1993)

=== Compilation albums ===
- 90-92-93 The Early Chapters (2007)

=== Live albums ===
- The Triumph of the Death (1994)
- Live at Babylonia (1998)
- Mythology XX Years of Witchcraft (2008)
- Sabbatical Live (2013)

=== Demo releases ===
- Gothik (1990)
- Demo '92 (1992)

== Members ==
=== Current ===
- Ossian – guitars (1988–present)
- Dipsas Dianaria - vocals (2018–present)
- Charon - bass (2018–present)
- m:A Fog - drums (2014–present)
- Alessandro Muscio - keyboards (2014–present)

=== Former ===
- Daniel Vintras – vocals (1990)
- Cadaveria – vocals (1992-2001)
- Madras - vocals (2001-2002)
- M the Bard - vocals, guitars (2003-2014; died 2017)
- Abigail Dianaria - vocals (2014-2018)
- Vlad - bass (1990-2014)
- Scùrs - bass (2014-2018)
- Flegias - drums (1992-2001)
- Taranis - drums (2001-2002)
- Dalamar - drums (2003-2014)
- Silent Bard - keyboards (1993-1995)
- Triskent - keyboards (1995-1997)
- Lunaris - keyboards (1997-2006)
