= Ossian D'Ambrosio =

Italian heavy metal musician (born 1970)

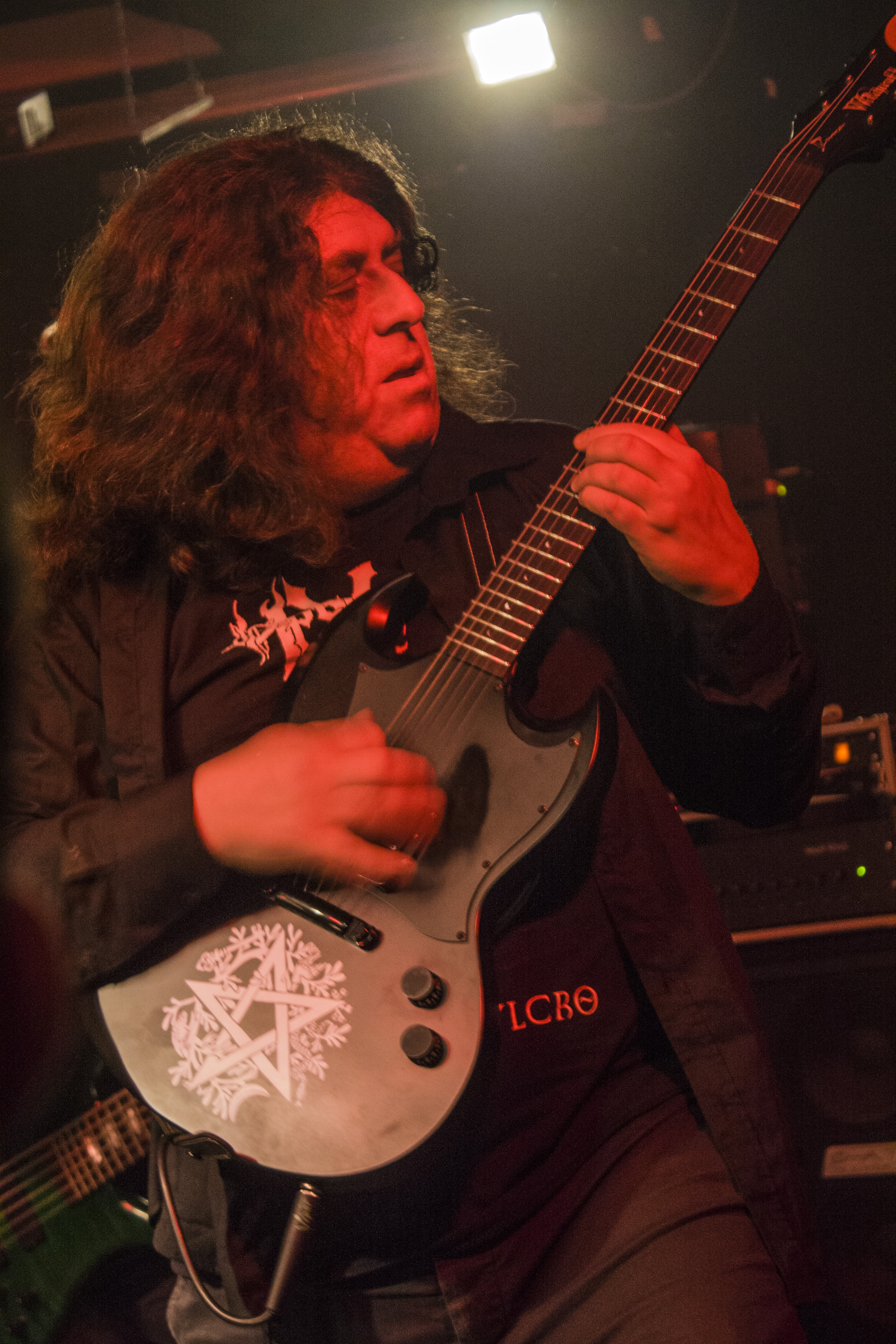
D'Ambrosio on stage with Opera IX in 2015

Ossian D'Ambrosio (born 18 September 1970 as Luigi D'Ambrosio), also known simply as Ossian, is an Italian heavy metal musician, organiser within modern Druidry, artisan jeweler and writer. He is the founder and leader of the Cerchio Druidico Italiano (transl. Italian Druidic Circle) and creator of an annual Beltane festival in Biella. He plays guitar in the symphonic black metal band Opera IX, which he founded in 1988.

== Early life ==
Luigi D'Ambrosio was born on 18 September 1970 in Nordhorn, Germany. In 1980, his family moved to Biella, Italy, where he grew up and continues to live. During his adolescence he listened to heavy metal music, where the lyrics of various bands provided his earliest approach to modern paganism.

== Druidry ==
Publicly known as Ossian D'Ambrosio, he first approached organised forms of modern paganism through Italian groups focused on witchcraft, but was unable to connect to their forms of spirituality. He got into modern Druidry through Emanuele Pauletti who was involved in the Druidic revivalism in Brittany. Another major influence has been the neoshamanism of Michael Harner and his Foundation for Shamanic Studies.

In 1994, D'Ambrosio founded the Branco dell'Antica Quercia (transl. Ancient Oak Pack), an association for research and for raising the profile of Celtic cultural heritage in northern Italy. Through this organisation, D'Ambrosio held a Beltane festival at the Zumaglia Castle in 1996. The festival turned into an annual event held in the Arcobaleno Park in Masserano, Biella.

At the Beltane festival in 2008, D'Ambrosio publicly launched the organisation Cerchio Druidico Italiano (CDI; transl. Italian Druidic Circle). The intention was to have a clear division, where the renamed Associazione Culturale Antica Quercia (transl. Ancient Oak Cultural Association) focuses on cultural and artistic activities, and the CDI is explicitly a religious group. Among the first activities of the new organisation was a seminar held the same autumn, where the main speakers were Philip Carr-Gomm, president of the British Order of Bards, Ovates and Druids (OBOD), and Davide "Cronos" Marré, president of the Italian Wicca group Circolo dei Trivi. The seminar became formative for the members of the CDI. D'Ambrosio was in return invited to the OBOD's celebration of summer solstice at Stonehenge in 2009. The CDI has continued to host a conference each autumn, often focused on a specific theme. Led by D'Ambrosio and his wife Maria Feo, the group has developed a modern Druidry where ecology and orientation toward place in northern Italy are central. Ceremonies are performed in oak and chestnut groves in the vicinity of archaeological sites.

D'Ambrosio has written books related to his engagement in modern Druidry. La via delle querce. Introduzione al druidismo moderno (2013; transl. The way of the oaks: Introduction to modern druidism) introduces the religion and tells the early history of the CDI. It elaborates on D'Ambrosio's approach to the religion, which acknowledges a historical rift caused by Christianisation, and tries to reinvent traditions and establish a deep link between contemporary people and nature, rather than to accurately reconstruct ancient Celtic spirituality. De negromancia. L'arte dell'evocazione dei morti (2020; transl. On necromancy: The art of summoning the dead) is a historical essay and practical guide to necromancy. The essay covers Greek myths such as how the witch Circe helped Odysseus to visit Tiresias in the underworld, and Biblical stories, such as King Saul's consultation of the Witch of Endor. D'Ambrosio provides his own grimoire intended to establish contact with the spirits of the dead, and a translation of a late 19th-century text by the occultist Charles Lancelin.

== Music ==
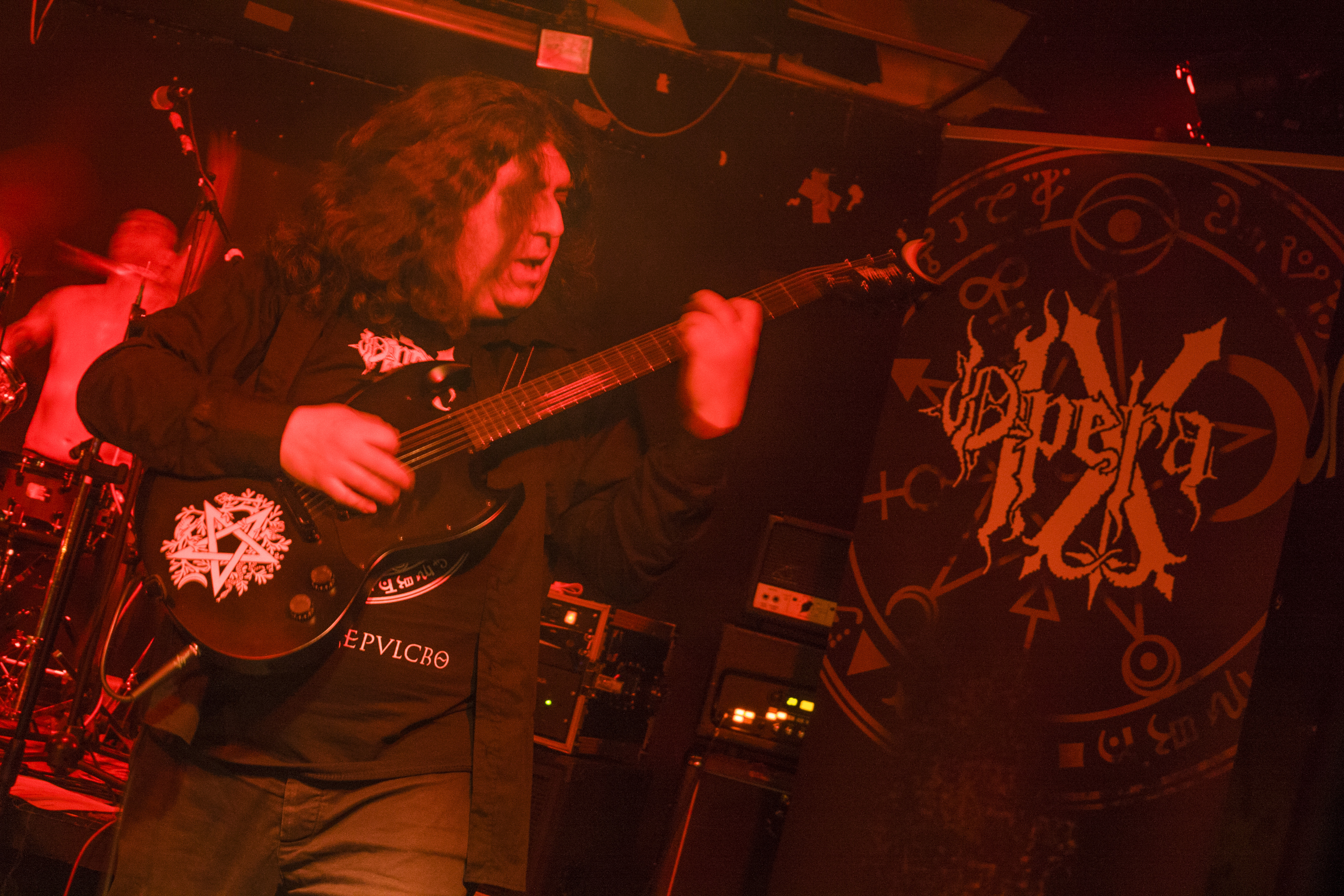
D'Ambrosio in 2015

Under the stage name Ossian, D'Ambrosio founded the symphonic black metal band Opera IX in Biella in 1988. He plays guitar and has been the only constant band member, as other members have been replaced multiple times. The band has alternated between female and male singers and had its greatest successes with the former, especially with the singer Cadaveria, who was a member from 1992 until she left in 2001 to pursue a solo career.

D'Ambrosio incorporates his interest in paganism in Opera IX's music and symbols. He says the band's dark aesthetic complements his engagement in Druidry and work with the Celtic festival, as he believes men have two archetypes, one dark and one sunny. He sees the band as a way to express his nocturnal side and achieve balance.

== Other activities and personal life ==
D'Ambrosio works as an artisan jeweler, selling jewelry with esoteric themes through a store he runs in Riva and online. He was married in 2001. His wife, Maria Feo, is also involved in the northern Italian Druid community, as an organiser of the Beltane festival and other annual events.

== Bibliography ==
- La via delle querce. Introduzione al druidismo moderno (2013) ISBN 978-88-88611-68-6
- De negromancia. L'arte dell'evocazione dei morti (2020) ISBN 978-88-9270-008-6

== See also ==
- Neopagan music
