= Tristania discography =

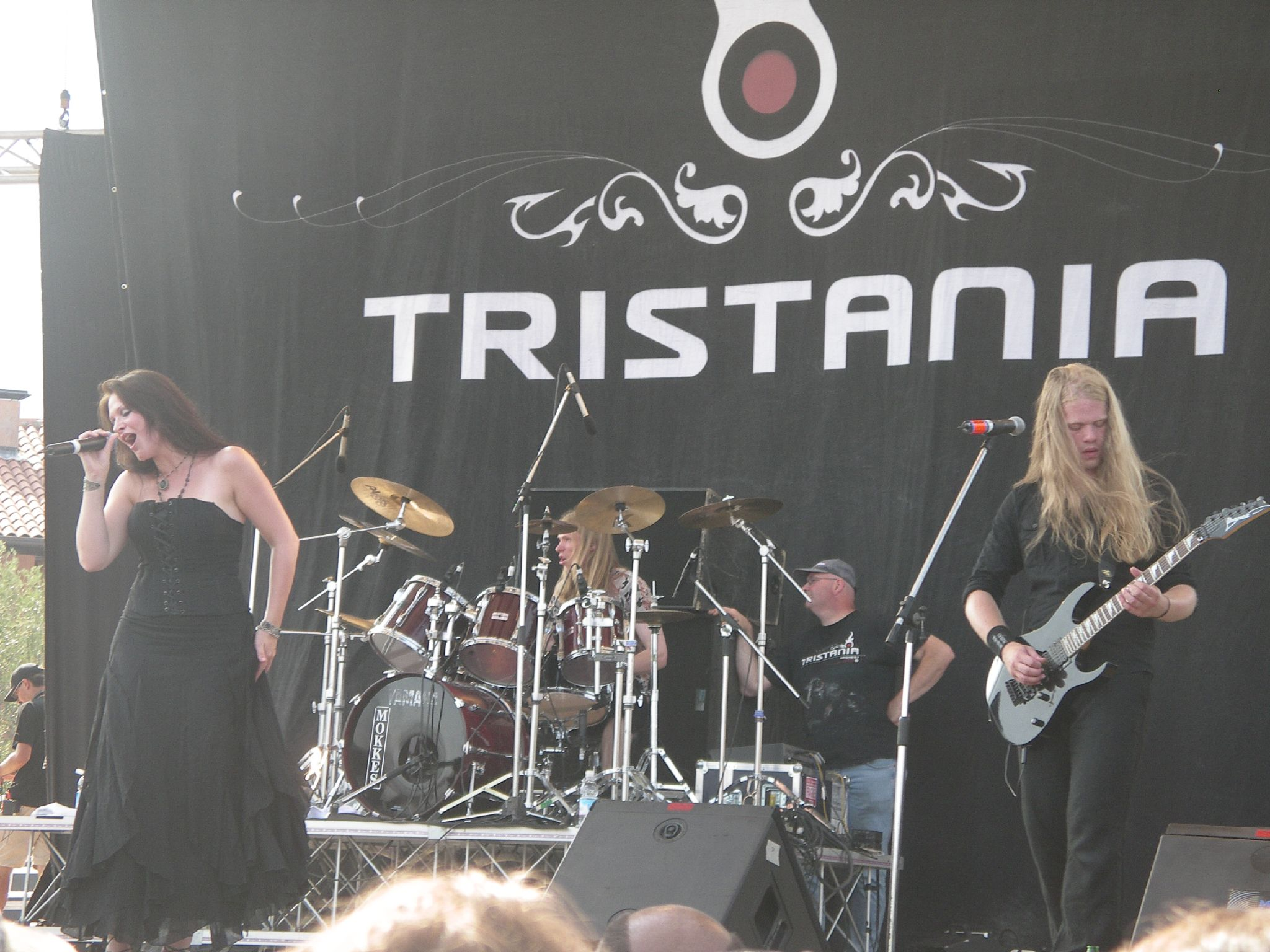
- Studio albums: 7
- EPs: 2
- Compilation albums: 1
- Singles: 6
- Video albums: 1
- Music videos: 4
- Demos: 1

The following is a comprehensive discography of Tristania, a Norwegian gothic metal band that formed in 1995. It was founded by Anders Høyvik Hidle and Morten Veland; Veland later left to form Sirenia. The band has released seven studio albums, one demo, one video album and two EPs.

== Albums ==
Title	Album details	Peak chart positions			
Title	Album details	GER	SWI	FRA	BEL (WA)
Widow's Weeds	Released: 9 March 1998; Label: Napalm Records; Formats: CD, CS, digital download	—	—	—	—
Beyond the Veil	Released: 8 September 1999; Label: Napalm Records; Formats: CD, CS, digital download	—	—	—	—
World of Glass	Released: 25 September 2001; Label: Napalm Records; Formats: CD, CS, LP, digital download	66	—	—	—
Ashes	Released: 1 February 2005; Label: Steamhammer; Formats: CD, digital download	—	—	184	—
Illumination	Released: 22 January 2007; Label: Steamhammer; Formats: CD, digital download	71	—	—	—
Rubicon	Released: 25 August 2010; Label: Napalm Records; Formats: CD, digital download	—	95	—	74
Darkest White	Released: 31 May 2013; Label: Napalm Records; Formats: CD, digital download	—	—	—	154
"—" denotes a recording that did not chart or was not released in that territory.

== Video albums ==
Title	Video details
Widow's Tour	Released: 1999; Label: Napalm Records; Formats: VHS

== Compilation albums ==
Title	Album details
Midwintertears	Released: 6 June 2005; Label: Napalm Records; Formats: CD+DVD, digital download

== EPs ==
Title	EP details
Angina	Released: 18 May 1999; Label: Napalm Records; Formats: CD
Sanguine Sky	Released: 3 January 2007; Label: SPV GmbH; Formats: CD

== Demos ==
Title	Demo details
Tristania	Released: 1997; Label: Self-released; Formats: CD

== Music videos ==
- Evenfall (1998)
- Equilibrium (2005)
- Libre (2005)
- Year of the Rat (2010)
