= Widow's weeds =

Widow's weeds can refer to:

- Widow's Weeds (Tristania album), an album by the Norwegian gothic metal band, Tristania.
- Widow's Weeds (Silversun Pickups album), an album by American alternative rock band, Silversun Pickups.
- Clothes worn by a widow during a period of mourning for her spouse (from the Old English waed meaning 'garment')
