= Morgul =

Norwegian symphonic black metal band

Morgul is a Norwegian symphonic black metal band formed in Råde in 1991.

== History ==
In 1991, Morgul recorded the demo tapes Vargvinter and In Gowns Flowing Wide, which were distributed through the underground. The band signed with Napalm Records.

The band, at this time, consisted of drummer Hex and Jack D. Ripper on guitars, bass, keyboard, and vocals. They released the albums Lost In Shadows Grey and Parody Of The Mass. The latter was recorded at Abyss Studios in Sweden with Mikael Hedlund from Hypocrisy, and created interest for Morgul within the underground black metal scene.

In 1999, Morgul signed to Century Media Records and started working on new material with a more varied sound. This album also marked a change in producer and studio. Every album including and following The Horror Grandeur was produced by Terje Refsnes at Soundsuite Studios in the south of France. Prior to the recording of The Horror Grandeur, Hex and Jack D. Ripper parted ways musically for personal reasons, leaving Jack D. Ripper solely responsible for Morgul. The only guest musician on The Horror Grandeur is Pete Johansen (The Scarr, Sins of Thy Beloved, Sirenia, Tristania), a violinist from Western Norway.

In 2001 Morgul entered the studio once again to record Sketch of Supposed Murderer. This would be Morgul's last album under the label Century Media.

In April 2002 Jack D. Ripper entered Soundsuite Studio to record the entirety of vocals for Swiss band Meridian on their first album, The Seventh Sun. Earlier in the year Meridian had won Metallians demo contest, which eventually led to a record deal with Season of Mist.

In 2004, after much hesitation and thoughts of leaving the music scene altogether, Morgul's front man re-entered Soundsuite and self-financed All Dead Here.... Once again this album features Pete Johansen on violins. One year later the album was released on the label Season Of Mist.

Jack D. Ripper now resides in the United States, where he is working on his next album. It is unknown where the next album will be recorded or on which label.

== Discography ==
=== Studio releases ===
- Lost in Shadows Grey - (1997)
- Parody of the Mass - (1998)
- The Horror Grandeur - (2000)
- Sketch of Supposed Murderer - (2001)
- All Dead Here... - (2005)

=== Demos ===
- Vargvinter [Demo] - (1992)
- In Gowns Flowing Wide [Demo] - (1994)

== Current members ==
- Jack D. Ripper - Vocals, Guitar, Bass, Keyboard, Drum programming, Arrangements (1991)

=== Session members ===
- Pete Johansen - violins (The Scarr, The Sins of Thy Beloved, Tristania, Sirenia)

=== Former members ===
- Hex - Drums (1990–1999)
- Tom Cuper - Drums (on "All Dead Here")

== Name ==
In The Lord of the Rings, Morgul is the Sindarin elvish word for "sorcery." The word is used in frequent association with the Nazgûl and their leader, the Witch-king of Angmar. The poisoned blades wielded by the Nazgûl were known as Morgul-knives, the land of the Witch-king in Mordor was known as the Morgul Vale (from which the Morgulduin river flowed), and his fortress there was named Minas Morgul.
