= TSOTB =

TSOTB may refer to:

- The Story of Tracy Beaker. A show from CBBC.
- The Sins of Thy Beloved
