= Carving an Icon =

Studio album by Viper Solfa
- Released: February 20, 2015
- Recorded: Transient Lab / Strand Studio / Spacemachine Studio in Oslo, Norway; Sound Suite Studio in Marseille, France, in May -July, 2014
- Genre: Extreme metal, gothic metal
- Length: 52:42
- Label: Massacre Records
- Producer: Terje Refsnes

Carving an Icon is the debut album by the Norwegian extreme / gothic metal band Viper Solfa. The album was released on February 20, 2015 under the German record label Massacre Records.

== History ==
Almost a year after Viper Solfa have settled in Kristiansand, Norway, the band signed a contract with Massacre Records in 2014, after composing and rehearsing several songs.

The recording sessions took place between May and July 2014 in Transient Lab (mostly), the Strand Studio in Oslo, Norway and several vocal tracks were recorded in the Spacemachine Studio. The recording and mixing were completed in Sound Suite Studio in Marseille, France with producer Terje Refsnes, who previously worked with groups of similar genres such as Trail of Tears, Tristania, Sirenia and Carpathian Forest among many. Carving an Icon was finally released on 20 February 2015.

Former Tristania singer Vibeke Stene is one of the main songwriters for the song called Whispers and Storms.

The cover art was created by renowned Brazilian graphic designer Marcelo Vasco, creator of the covers of bands such as Machine Head, Dimmu Borgir and Borknagar.

== Track listing ==
No.	Title	Lyrics	Music	Length
1.	"Deranged"	Sphinx, Ronny Thorsen	Morfeus	4:47
2.	"Funeral of Kings"	Sphinx, Ronny Thorsen	Morfeus	5:43
3.	"Carving an Icon"	Sphinx, Ronny Thorsen	Morfeus	4:42
4.	"The Toxic Thousands"	Sphinx, Ronny Thorsen	Morfeus	4:50
5.	"Vulture Kingdom"	Sphinx, Ronny Thorsen	Morfeus	5:03
6.	"Call For Silence"	Sphinx, Ronny Thorsen	Morfeus	5:40
7.	"War of Zion"	Sphinx, Ronny Thorsen	Morfeus	4:31
8.	"The Viper Legion"	Sphinx, Ronny Thorsen	Morfeus	4:32
9.	"Whispers and Storms"	Vibeke Stene, Ronny Thorsen	Morfeus	5:01
10.	"Shahanshah"	Sphinx, Ronny Thorsen	Morfeus	7:03
Total length:				52:42

== Personnel ==
=== Viper Solfa ===
- Ronny Thorsen - Male vocals (growling)
- Miriam Elisabeth Renvåg "Sphinx" - Female vocals
- Krister Dreyer "Morfeus" - Guitars, keyboards, orchestrations
- Endre Moe "Mr. Moe" - Bass guitar
- Bjørn Dugstad Rønnow - Drums

=== Production and engineering ===
- Terje Refsnes - producer, engineer
- Marius Strand - mixing, mastering
- Marcelo Vasco - cover art, design
