= World of Glass =

World of Glass may refer to:

- World of Glass (album), an album by the band Tristania
- World of Glass (St Helens), a museum in St Helens, Merseyside, England
- World of Glass (also called the International Exhibition for Glass Products, Manufacturing, Processing and Finishing Technology), a conference for the Russian glass industry organised by Expocentre
