= Pete Johansen =

Norwegian violinist

Per Oscar "Pete" Johansen is a Norwegian violinist born 11 May 1962, recognized for his many recordings in albums by gothic metal bands, in which he is distinguished for his peculiar style.

== Biography ==
Johansen began playing the violin at the age of 9, and started his first tour with a country music band when he was 16 years old.

During the 1990s, he fronted a band called Modesty Blaise. The band released one album on SPM Records called "Face of the Sun."

He has worked with The Sins of Thy Beloved, Tristania, Sirenia and Morgul.

He's currently the violinist for Art of Departure,

== Discography ==
Johansen has played with the following bands on the following albums:

- The Sins of Thy Beloved
  - Lake of Sorrow
  - Perpetual Desolation
- Tristania
  - Widow's Weeds
  - Beyond the Veil
  - World of Glass
  - Rubicon
- Morgul
  - All Dead Here...
  - The Horror Grandeur
  - Sketch of Supposed Murderer
- Sirenia
  - At Sixes and Sevens
- Art of Departure
  - Art of Departure (2024)
