= Moon in the Scorpio =

Studio album by Limbonic Art
- Released: 9 July 1996
- Genre: Symphonic black metal
- Length: 59:31
- Label: Nocturnal Art
- Producer: Anders G. Offenberg Jr., Limbonic Art

Limbonic Art chronology
Moon in the Scorpio (1996)	In Abhorrence Dementia (1997)

Moon in the Scorpio is the debut studio album by the Norwegian symphonic black metal band Limbonic Art. It was recorded at Bondi Lydstudio and released in July 1996 through Nocturnal Art Productions.

Cover artwork is done by band member Morpheus.

== Track listing ==
No.	Title	Length
1.	"Beneath the Burial Surface"	13:42
2.	"Moon in the Scorpio"	08:22
3.	"Through Gleams of Death"	07:58
4.	"Overture: Nocturne"	01:19
5.	"In Mourning Mystique"	14:41
6.	"Beyond the Candles Burning"	07:08
7.	"Darkzone Martyrium"	06:21
8.	"The Dark Rivers of the Heart" (bonus track)	07:02
Total length:		66:40

== Personnel ==
- Daemon – lead vocals, guitars, bass
- Morfeus – keyboards, lead guitars, drum programming, vocals
- Morgana – additional vocals, photography
