= Darkest White =

Studio album by Tristania
- Released: 31 May 2013
- Recorded: January 2013
- Genre: Gothic metal; death/doom
- Length: 51:58
- Label: Napalm
- Producer: Christer-André Cederberg

Tristania chronology
Rubicon (2010)	Darkest White (2013)

Professional ratings
Review scores
Source	Rating
About.com	4.5/5 stars
Metal Hammer	3.6/5 stars
Metal Storm	4.5/5 stars

Darkest White is the seventh and final full-length album by the Norwegian gothic metal band Tristania. It is the second Tristania album to feature Mariangela Demurtas and Kjetil Nordhus on vocals.

== Overview ==
The demo that gave birth to the final version of the songs in Darkest White were produced between June and September 2012. Soon after, the band readjusted the songs by themselves, in an improvised studio at Ole Vistnes' apartment, between September and December 2012. In January 2013, the band entered the studio to make the definitive recordings of the album, finishing in less than a month, the band's shortest recording period so far.

Early April, the band announced Darkest White official track list.

== Critical reception ==
The album was critically well received, and often considered the "real come back" for the band after former vocalist Vibeke Stene departure, in 2007. The album was praised for its "exploration of dark, desolate beauty" mood while called an "emotional thread". Another aspect that was well received was the "flawlessly accomplished" three-vocalist style driven throughout the album with the harsh vocals from Anders H. Hidle, the clean vocals from the returning Kjetil Nordhus and Mariangela Demurtas' female vocals. The combination of this three vocalists was considered "intelligent" and "diligent".

== Track listing ==
No.	Title	Lyrics	Music	Length
1.	"Number"	Tarald Lie Jr.	Tristania	4:45
2.	"Darkest White"	Tarald Lie Jr.	Tristania	3:25
3.	"Himmelfall"	Tarald Lie Jr.	Tristania	5:47
4.	"Requiem"	Tarald Lie Jr.	Tristania	5:29
5.	"Diagnosis"	Tarald Lie Jr.	Tristania	5:02
6.	"Scarling"	Tarald Lie Jr.	Tristania	5:18
7.	"Night on Earth"	Tarald Lie Jr.	Tristania	3:36
8.	"Cathedral" (Digipak bonus track)	Tarald Lie Jr.	Tristania	3:31
9.	"Lavender"	Tarald Lie Jr.	Tristania	5:11
10.	"Cypher"	Tarald Lie Jr.	Tristania	5:43
11.	"Arteries"	Tarald Lie Jr.	Tristania	4:11

== Charts ==
Chart (2013)	Peak position
Belgian Albums Chart (Wallonia)	154

== Personnel ==
=== Tristania ===
- Mariangela Demurtas – vocals
- Kjetil Nordhus – vocals
- Anders Høyvik Hidle – guitars & harsh vocals
- Ole Vistnes – bass & vocals
- Gyri Smørdal Losnegaard – guitars
- Einar Moen – synths & programming*
- Tarald Lie Jr. – drums

Additional personnel

- Einar Moen is listed as the band's synth player in the booklet, however Bernt Moen is credited with having performed the synth on this album.
