= Legacy of Evil =

Studio album by Limbonic Art
- Released: October 23, 2007
- Recorded: 2007 at MOF Studios
- Genre: Symphonic black metal
- Length: 59:06
- Label: Nocturnal Art
- Producer: Limbonic Art

Limbonic Art chronology
The Ultimate Death Worship (2002)	Legacy of Evil (2007)	Phantasmagoria (2010)

Legacy of Evil is the sixth studio album by the Norwegian symphonic black metal band Limbonic Art.

Released by Nocturnal Art Productions and marketed and distributed by Candlelight Records. Recorded at MOF studios 2007 by Morfeus. Mastered by Tom Kvålsvoll at Strype Audio. Produced and mixed by Limbonic Art. All lyrics written by Daemon.

== Track listing ==
No.	Title	Length
1.	"A Cosmic Funeral of Memories"	07:39
2.	"A Void of Lifeless Dreams"	04:51
3.	"Grace by Torments"	05:20
4.	"Infernal Phantom Kingdom"	05:30
5.	"Legacy of Evil"	05:37
6.	"Lycanthropic Tales"	06:44
7.	"Nebulous Dawn"	04:42
8.	"Seven Doors of Death"	07:07
9.	"Twilight Omen"	07:22
10.	"Unleashed from Hell"	04:14
Total length:		59:06

== Reception ==
CD Universe reviewed the album and gave it a positive score. It quotes:

Limbonic Art's comeback album takes a more direct approach, beating the listener into submission, rather than coiling around him like a serpent. Where synthesizers were a primary component in the band's past work, they are now used as punctuation marks to the band's increasingly brutal musical statements. Aligning themselves more with Behemoth and Angelcorpse, Limbonic Art has evolved from ambient black metal into a form of pure death metal. Still, the apocalyptic gloom of "Grace by Torments" is a reminder of the band's heritage. And, ever the expressive technicians, Limbonic Art wields its instruments with razor-sharp precision.

— CD Universe

== Personnel ==
- Daemon - guitars, bass, lead vocals, backing vocals
- Morfeus - lead guitars, electronics, vocals
- Tom Kvålsvoll - mastering
