= The Ultimate Death Worship =

Studio album by Limbonic Art
- Released: 2002
- Genre: Symphonic black metal
- Length: 51:38
- Label: Nocturnal Art
- Producer: Limbonic Art

Limbonic Art chronology
Ad Noctum - Dynasty of Death (1999)	The Ultimate Death Worship (2002)	Legacy of Evil (2007)

The Ultimate Death Worship is the fifth studio album by the Norwegian symphonic black metal band Limbonic Art released in 2002 on Nocturnal Art Productions. The album was recorded winter 2001/2002 and mastered at Strype Audio. There was also an LP release by Displeased Records with a bonus track "Voyage of the Damned". In 2010 it was re-released by Candlelight Records with the above-mentioned bonus track.

The album was rated four out of five stars by John Serba of AllMusic, writing that it "offers enough convincingly strange, avant-garde horror to stand on its own crooked, cloven-hoofed legs."

== Track listing ==
No.	Title	Length
1.	"The Ultimate Death Worship"	07:59
2.	"Suicide Commando"	07:20
3.	"Purgatorial Agony"	03:25
4.	"Towards the Oblivion of Dreams"	10:07
5.	"Last Rite for the Silent Darkstar"	02:28
6.	"Interstellar Overdrive"	06:04
7.	"From the Shades of Hatred"	06:10
8.	"Funeral of Death"	08:05
9.	"Voyage of the Damned" (2010 re-release bonus track)	04:40
Total length:		56:18

The LP version by Displeased Records puts the bonus track between "Purgatorial Agony" and "Towards the Oblivion of Dreams".

== Personnel ==
- Daemon - guitars, vocals, piano on "Towards the Oblivion of Dreams", lyrics
- Morfeus - guitars, electronics, cover art

== Additional personnel ==
- Attila Csihar - vocals on "From the Shades of Hatred"
- Peter Lundell - engineering
- Tom Kvålsvoll - mastering
