= Epitome of Illusions =

Studio album by Limbonic Art
- Released: 27 November 1998
- Genre: Symphonic black metal
- Length: 44:55
- Label: Nocturnal Art
- Producer: Peter Lundell

Limbonic Art chronology
In Abhorrence Dementia (1997)	Epitome of Illusions (1998)	Ad Noctum - Dynasty of Death (1999)

Epitome of Illusions is the third studio album by the Norwegian symphonic black metal band Limbonic Art released in 1998 on Nocturnal Art Productions. The album itself is composed of rerecorded material from the band's pre-label demos, so it can be considered both as a studio and a compilation album, although Morfeus said in an interview that it is not a full release.

== Track listing ==
No.	Title	Length
1.	"Symphony in Moonlight and Nightmares"	05:37
2.	"Eve of Midnight"	07:37
3.	"Path of Ice"	06:17
4.	"Sources to Agonies"	04:15
5.	"Solace of the Shadows"	06:55
6.	"The Black Hearts Nirvana"	10:27
7.	"Phantasmagorial Dreams" (bonus track)	06:23
8.	"Arctic Odyssey"	03:44
Total length:		51:15

== Personnel ==
- Daemon - guitars, bass, vocals
- Morfeus - guitars, keyboards, vocals, drum programming
- Peter Lundell - producer, mixing
- Thomas Hvitstein - band photography
