= Anita Auglend =

Norwegian singer

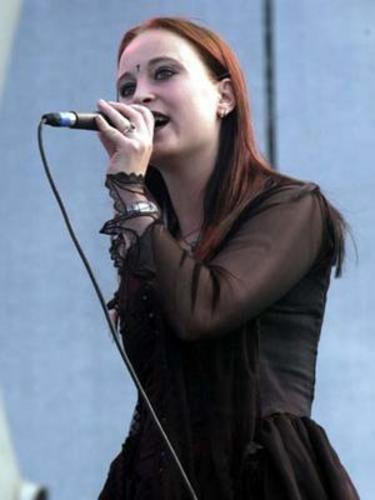
- Anita Auglend live in a concert

Background information
- Born: Anita Auglend; 24 January 1979 (age 47)
- Origin: Norway
- Genres: Gothic metal, doom metal
- Occupation: Singer
- Instrument: Vocals
- Years active: 1996–2013
- Label: Napalm Records
- Formerly of: The Sins of Thy Beloved

Anita Auglend (born 24 January 1979), is a Norwegian singer who was the lead vocalist of the gothic-doom metal band The Sins of Thy Beloved. She has a soprano vocal range.

== The Sins of Thy Beloved ==
After the albums Lake of Sorrow (1998) and Perpetual Desolation (2000), she left the band in 2001 along with their keyboardists Anders Thue and Ingfrid Stensland because of the travelling required of the band. She was later rumored to have returned to the band in 2007, although this has never been confirmed.

== Discography ==
=== With The Sins of Thy Beloved ===
- Lake of Sorrow - 1998
- Perpetual Desolation - 2000
- Perpetual Desolation Live - 2001
- Perpetual Desolation Live in México

=== EPs ===
- All Alone - 1998
- Silent Pain - 1997
