= In Abhorrence Dementia =

Studio album by Limbonic Art
- Released: 1997
- Genre: Symphonic black metal
- Length: 63:39
- Label: Nocturnal Art
- Producer: Peter Lundell, Limbonic Art

Limbonic Art chronology
Moon in the Scorpio (1996)	In Abhorrence Dementia (1997)	Epitome of Illusions (1998)

In Abhorrence Dementia is the second studio album by the Norwegian symphonic black metal band Limbonic Art released in 1997 through Nocturnal Art Productions.

== Track listing ==
No.	Title	Length
1.	"In Abhorrence Dementia"	07:25
2.	"A Demonoid Virtue"	07:40
3.	"Descend to Oblivion" (bonus track)	05:31
4.	"A Venomous Kiss of Profane Grace"	07:05
5.	"When Mind and Flesh Departs"	07:38
6.	"Deathtrip to a Mirage Asylum"	12:13
7.	"Under Burdens of Life's Holocaust"	06:26
8.	"Abyssmal Necromancy" (bonus track)	06:55
9.	"Oceania" (Instrumental)	00:43
10.	"Behind the Mask Obscure"	07:14
11.	"Misanthropic Spectrum"	07:15
Total length:		01:16:05

== Personnel ==
=== Band members ===
- Daemon – lead vocals, guitars
- Morfeus – keyboards, lead guitars, drum programming, vocals

=== Guests ===
- Morgana – additional vocals
- Lisbeth Fagerheim – additional vocals

=== Technical staff ===
- Peter Lundell – producer, mixing
- Vargnatt Inc. – mastering
- Grim Lindberg – video for photos
- Morfeus – artwork
