= Ad Noctum - Dynasty of Death =

Studio album by Limbonic Art
- Released: June 1999
- Recorded: Spring 1999 at Pete's Place Recording Studio
- Genre: Symphonic black metal
- Length: 58:04
- Label: Nocturnal Art
- Producers: Peter Lundell, Limbonic Art

Limbonic Art chronology
Epitome of Illusions (1998)	Ad Noctum - Dynasty of Death (1999)	The Ultimate Death Worship (2002)

Ad Noctum - Dynasty of Death is the fourth studio album by the Norwegian symphonic black metal band Limbonic Art released in 1999 on Nocturnal Art Productions.

== Track listing ==
No.	Title	Length
1.	"The Dark Paranormal Calling"	6:46
2.	"As the Bell of Immolation Calls"	9:47
3.	"Pits of the Cold Beyond"	5:41
4.	"Dynasty of Death"	9:33
5.	"Behind the Darkened Walls of Sleep" (bonus track)	11:25
6.	"The Supreme Sacrifice"	8:40
7.	"In Embers of Infernal Greed"	6:20
8.	"Enthralled by the Shrine of Silence" (bonus track)	6:23
9.	"The Yawning Abyss of Madness"	11:17
Total length:		75:52

== Personnel ==
- Daemon - guitars, bass, vocals
- Morfeus - keyboards, guitars, samples
- Per Eriksen - gong
- Peter Lundell - producer, mixing
- Olof Karlsson - photography
- Kerstin Rossler - photography (live)
