= Krister Dreyer =

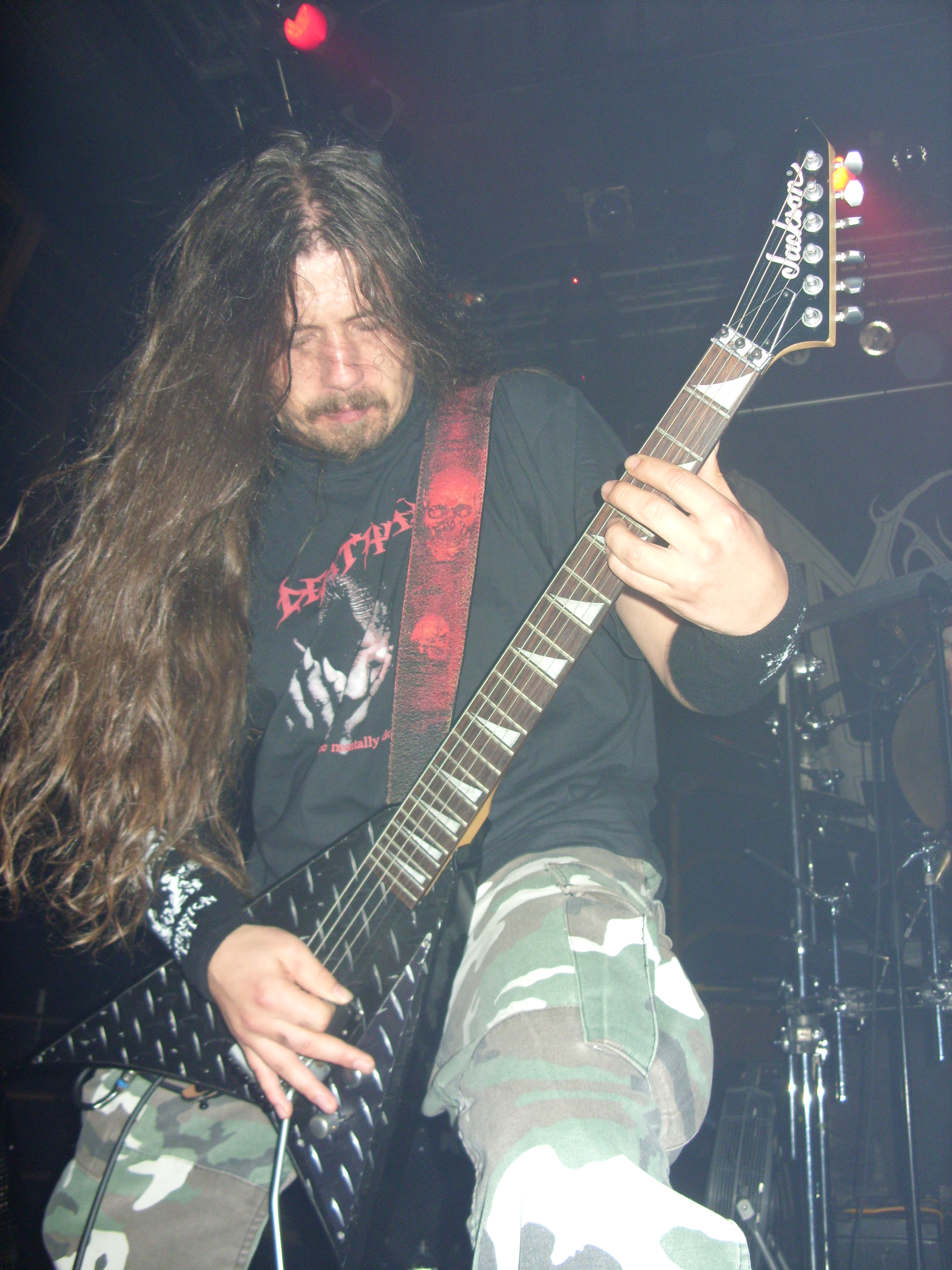
- Morfeus in concert with Mayhem in 2009

Background information
- Also known as: Morfeus
- Born: Krister Dreyer; 11 September 1974 (age 51); Sandefjord, Norway
- Genres: Gothic metal, symphonic black metal, electronic metal
- Occupations: Vocalist, guitarist, keyboardist, drummer
- Instruments: Vocals, guitar, bass guitar, drums, keyboards, lyre
- Years active: 1995–present
- Labels: Dark Essence Records; Candlelight Records; Massacre Records
- Website: https://myspace.com/rawkingrl

Krister Dreyer (born 11 September 1974), commonly known as Morfeus, is a Norwegian musician, singer, songwriter and multi-instrumentalist.

Morfeus is noted for his work in several bands in Norway, including Mayhem, Limbonic Art, Dimension F3H and Viper Solfa.

== Discography ==
=== With Limbonic Art ===
- Promo Rehearsal '95 (Demo) (1995)
- Promo 1996 (Demo) (1996)
- Moon in the Scorpio (1996)
- In Abhorrence Dementia (1997)
- Epitome of Illusions (1998)
- Ad Noctum - Dynasty of Death (1999)
- The Ultimate Death Worship (2002)
- Legacy of Evil (2007)

=== With Dimension F3H ===
(as Mr. Morfeus):

- The 3rd Generation Armageddon (Demo) (2000)
- A Presentation of Armageddon (EP) (2002)
- Reaping the World Winds (2003)
- Does the Pain Excite You? (2007)

=== With Viper Solfa ===
(as Morfeus):

- Carving an Icon (2015)

=== As a guest or session musician ===
- Ad Inferna. In Opus 7: Elevation (2014), song "InVisible"
- Ad Inferna. In L'Empire des Sens (2001), song "The Vampyrik Supremacy"
- Aeon Winds. In And Night Shall Have Dominion (EP) (2014)
- Dark Fortress. In Profane Genocidal Creations (2003)
- Finnugor: In Darkness Needs Us (2004)
- Immemoreal. In Towards 1347 (Demo) (1999)
- Immemoreal: In Temple of Retribution (2001)
- Megaera: In Irrlycht / Megaera (Split) (2009)
- Octavia Sperati: In Grace Submerged (2007), keyboards and piano in "Don't Believe a Word", samples in "Submerged"
