= Beyond the Veil (album) =

Studio album by Tristania
- Released: 6 September 1999
- Recorded: February–April, 1999
- Studio: Sound Suite Studio, Norway
- Genre: Gothic metal, symphonic metal
- Length: 52:24
- Label: Napalm
- Producer: Tristania, Terje Refsnes

Tristania chronology
Widow's Weeds (1998)	Beyond the Veil (1999)	World of Glass (2001)

Singles from Beyond the Veil
- 1. "Angina" Released: 18 May 1999

Professional ratings
Review scores
Source	Rating
Chronicles of Chaos	9/10
Collector's Guide to Heavy Metal	7/10
Metal.de	8/10
Rough Edge	3.5/4 stars
Rock Hard	9.0/10

Beyond the Veil is the second full-length album by the Norwegian band Tristania. It is the last album to feature the band's former vocalist, guitarist and core songwriter, Morten Veland.

== Background and influence ==
Tristania stood apart from the other bands of the genre with their use of three distinct vocal styles in the "operatic soprano Vibeke Stene, clean-singing counter-tenor Østen Bergøy, and harsh, black metal-style shrieker Morten Veland". Beyond the Veil made use of a ten-member choir and featured violin passages from Pete Johansen of The Sins of Thy Beloved, earning "rave reviews" across Europe. By then, the band had risen to "the top of the gothic metal heap" with their "lush, symphonically enhanced" approach. The album features "tender ethereal female voices" and "the brutality and harshness", making it a promoter on the gothic metal scene. They were "dealt a potentially crippling blow" when singer, guitarist and principal composer Veland left the group to form Sirenia. Tristania has continued to prosper with subsequent releases and has since been "regarded as one of the world's premiere goth metal bands".

== Track listing ==
No.	Title	Lyrics	Music	Length
1.	"Beyond the Veil"	Einar Moen, Morten Veland	Moen, Veland	6:37
2.	"Aphelion"	Veland	Veland	7:49
3.	"A Sequel of Decay"	Veland	Moen, Veland	6:32
4.	"Opus Relinque"	Moen	Anders Hidle, Moen	6:06
5.	"Lethean River"	Veland	Moen, Veland	5:55
6.	"...Of Ruins and a Red Nightfall"	Veland	Veland	6:21
7.	"Simbelmynë" (Instrumental)		Moen	0:59
8.	"Angina"	Veland	Veland	4:38
9.	"Heretique"	Moen	Hidle, Moen	4:49
10.	"Dementia"	Moen	Moen	2:21
Total length:				52:24

== Personnel ==
Tristania

- Vibeke Stene – lead vocals, backing vocals
- Morten Veland – rhythm guitar, harsh vocals, backing vocals
- Anders H. Hidle – lead guitar, backing vocals
- Rune Østerhus – bass
- Einar Moen – synth and programming
- Kenneth Olsson – drums, backing vocals

Additional musicians

- Østen Bergøy – clean vocals
- Pete Johansen – violin
- Jan Kenneth Barkved – clean vocals on "Heretique", choir
- Hilde T. Bommen Rasmussen, Maiken Stene, Sissel B. Stene, Jeanett Johannessen, Rino A. Kolstø – choir
