= Viper Solfa =

Norwegian band

- Origin: Kristiansand, Norway
- Genres: Extreme metal, gothic metal
- Years active: 2013–present
- Labels: Massacre Records
- Spinoff of: Trail of Tears
- Members: Ronny Thorsen; Morfeus; Sphinx; Mr. Moe; Bjørn Dugstad Rønnow
- Website: Official Homepage

Viper Solfa is a Norwegian extreme gothic metal band from Kristiansand, Norway. It was founded in 2013 by Ronny Thorsen, once the symphonic gothic metal band Trail of Tears was separated.

== History ==
After almost two decades of to exist Trail of Tears, the differences between some of its surviving members had become unsustainable; in consequence, they decided to go their own way in early 2013, prior to the release of their seventh studio album Oscillation.

Viper Solfa came some months later in the same year, as an idea of the lead singer Ronny Thorsen, who wanted a somewhat different project he had done so far, with a more aggressive sound and focused on gothic black metal and power metal.

Thorsen quickly gathered his former colleagues in Trail of Tears: bassist Endre Moe (formerly Dimension F3H and Cutthroat), and drummer Bjørn Dugstad Rønnow (Sphere).

Thorsen asked to join at the prominent singer and multi-instrumentalist "Morfeus" (Krister Dreyer), who was already known for his work in other Norwegian bands such as Mayhem, Limbonic Art and Dimension F3H. Morfeus accepted and immediately took the role of main songwriter and the interpretation of the guitar, keyboards and orchestration.

With the material at hand, it became clear that the sound needed a female voice; after a hearing with more than two dozen singers from around the world, they elected the Norwegian soprano Miriam "Sphinx" Renvåg of the avant-garde metal band Ram-Zet as the last piece of the group. Therefore, Viper Solfa has a line-up composed of consolidated and recognized musicians in vast musical genres.

Almost a year after it was established, they signed a contract with the German independent record label Massacre Records and recorded between May and July 2014 in Transient Lab (mostly). Strand Spacemachine Studio and Studio in Oslo, Norway; finished the production and mixing in the Sound Suite Studio in Marseille, France with producer Terje Refsnes. The debut album was titled Carving an Icon, and was released on February 20, 2015.

== Band name ==
According to an interview with Ronny Thorsen in July 2015, he named his band Viper Solfa for two basic reasons:

Viper Solfa stands for poisonous music without boundaries. Solfa is an ancient singing technique or scale if you will and the viper represents the poisonous part. The viper symbolises something fast and deadly but also elegant, and the idea with the name is to make music that sounds at the same time deadly, fast and poisonous without the restraints of genres.

== Discography ==
=== Studio albums ===
- Carving an Icon CD (2015, Massacre Records)

== Members ==
- Ronny Thorsen - Male vocals (growling)
- Miriam Elisabeth Renvåg "Sphinx" - Female vocals
- Krister Dreyer "Morfeus" - Guitars, keyboards, orchestrations
- Endre Moe "Mr. Moe" - Bass guitar
- Bjørn Dugstad Rønnow - Drums
