= Limbonic Art =

Norwegian symphonic black metal band

- Origin: Sandefjord, Norway
- Genre: Symphonic black metal
- Years active: 1993–2003, 2006–present
- Labels: Nocturnal Art, Candlelight
- Members: Daemon
- Past members: Full list

Limbonic Art is a Norwegian symphonic black metal band from Sandefjord.

== History ==
Limbonic Art was formed in 1993 by Daemon, and was originally a full band featuring 3 other members. Daemon got in touch with Morfeus after the demise of the first line-up. The first recording, a rehearsal demo, was released independently in 1995. The debut album Moon in the Scorpio was released in 1996. The follow-up, 1997's In Abhorrence Dementia, was supported by a tour opening for Emperor, and a year later Limbonic Art issued its third LP, Epitome of Illusions. In 2003, the band decided to split up with a statement from the official site saying "We feel that we have reached as far as we could in our collaboration ... the circle is complete, begin another".

On June 6, 2006, Limbonic Art reunited and started to write new material. On February 21, 2007, it was announced that the band plans to release the new album entitled Legacy of Evil in the summer.

A subsequent dispute between the band members resulted in Morfeus being ousted from the band in 2009, making Limbonic Art essentially Daemon's solo project. Following his departure, Limbonic Art released Phantasmagoria (2010) and Spectre Abysm (2017).

== Discography ==
Studio albums

- Moon in the Scorpio (1996)
- In Abhorrence Dementia (1997)
- Epitome of Illusions (1998)
- Ad Noctum - Dynasty of Death (1999)
- The Ultimate Death Worship (2002)
- Legacy of Evil (2007)
- Phantasmagoria (2010)
- Spectre Abysm (2017)
- Opus Daemoniacal (2024)

Demo albums

- Promo Rehearsal '95 (1995)
- Promo 1996 (1996)

Compilation albums

- Chronicles of Limbo (2000)
- Volume I-IV (2001)
- 1995-1996 (2009)
- 1996 (2010)

== Line-up ==
Current members

- Vidar "Daemon" Jensen - vocals, guitars, bass, keyboards, drum programming, electronics - (1993–2003, 2006–present)

Past members

- Krister "Morfeus" Dreyer - lead guitar, vocals (on early albums), keyboards, drum programming, electronics, samples (1993–2003, 2006–2010)
- Erlend Hole - bass (1993)
- Roger Jacobsen - drums (1993)
- Roy A. Sørlie - guitars (1993)
- Per Eriksen - drums (1995–1996)
