= Illumination (Tristania album) =

Studio album by Tristania
- Released: 22 January 2007
- Recorded: March–April 2006 at Woodhouse Studios, Hagen, Germany
- Genre: Gothic metal
- Length: 48:25; 52:33 (Europe); 54:08 (North America)
- Label: SPV/Steamhammer
- Producer: Waldemar Sorychta

Tristania chronology
Ashes (2005)	Illumination (2007)	Rubicon (2010)

Professional ratings
Review scores
Source	Rating
Allmusic	4.5/5 stars
Metal Storm	4/5 stars
Revolver	2.5/5 stars
Sputnikmusic	4/5 stars

Illumination is the fifth full-length album by the Norwegian band Tristania. It is the last album to feature Vibeke Stene on vocals, Rune Østerhus on bass, Svein Terje Solvang on guitar, and Kenneth Olsson on drums. This is also the final album to feature Østen Bergøy as an official member of the band, although he performed some vocal work on the band's next studio album as a session member.

== Track listing ==
No.	Title	Lyrics	Music	Length
1.	"Mercyside"	Østen Bergøy	Anders Hidle, Einar Moen, Waldemar Sorychta	4:39
2.	"Sanguine Sky"	Kjartan Hermansen	Hidle, Moen	3:50
3.	"Open Ground"	Bergøy	Hidle, Moen	4:40
4.	"The Ravens"	Bergøy	Hidle, Moen	5:06
5.	"Destination Departure"	Moen	Hidle, Moen	4:34
6.	"Down"	Bergøy	Hidle, Moen	4:32
7.	"Fate"	Bergøy	Hidle, Moen	4:59
8.	"Lotus"	Bergøy	Hidle, Moen	5:08
9.	"Sacrilege"	Moen	Hidle, Moen	4:15
10.	"Deadlands" (track 11 in European and North American versions)	Bergøy	Hidle, Moen	6:39
Total length:				48:25

European version
No.	Title	Lyrics	Music	Length
10.	"In the Wake"	Bergøy	Hidle, Moen	4:08
Total length:				52:33

North American version
No.	Title	Lyrics	Music	Length
10.	"Ab Initio"	Bergøy	Hidle, Moen	5:43
Total length:				54:08

== Charts ==
Chart (2007)	Peak position
German Albums Chart	71

== Personnel ==
=== Tristania ===
- Vibeke Stene – Vocals
- Østen Bergøy – Vocals
- Anders Høyvik Hidle – Guitars
- Einar Moen – Synths & Programming
- Svein Terje Solvang – Guitars, Vocals on "In the Wake"
- Rune Østerhus – Bass
- Kenneth Olsson – Drums

=== Session Members ===
- Vorph – harsh vocals on "Mercyside", "The Ravens" & "In The Wake"
- Petra Stalz – violin
- Heike Haushalter – violin
- Monika Malek – viola
- Gesa Hangen – cello

== Production ==
- Produced by Waldemar Sorychta
- Recorded & engineered by Waldemar Sorychta, Siggi Bemm, Dennis Koehne
- Mixed by Waldemar Sorychta
