= Rubicon (Tristania album) =

Studio album by Tristania
- Released: 25 August 2010
- Recorded: January–March, 2010 at Tanken Studio, Oslo, K-Lab Studio, Stavanger and Amadeus Studio, Oslo, Norway
- Genre: Gothic metal
- Length: 47:08
- Label: Napalm
- Producer: Anders Høyvik Hidle, Ole Vistnes, Waldemar Sorychta

Tristania chronology
Illumination (2007)	Rubicon (2010)	Darkest White (2013)

Professional ratings
Review scores
Source	Rating
About.com	3.5/5 stars
Metal Storm	7.7/10 stars
Stormbringer	4.5/5 stars

Rubicon is the sixth full-length album by the Norwegian band Tristania. It is the first Tristania album to feature Italian vocalist Mariangela Demurtas, who replaced former frontwoman Vibeke Stene.

== Overview ==
The album displays a different lineup from the previous album. It is the first Tristania album to feature Mariangela Demurtas on female vocals, Kjetil Nordhus on clean male vocals, Gyri Smørdal Losnegaard on guitars, Ole Vistnes on bass, and Tarald Lie Jr. on drums. It's also the first album with harsh vocals that are performed entirely by guitarist Anders Høyvik Hidle. Pete Johansen made a guest appearance on violin after a nearly ten-year absence. Singer Østen Bergøy appeared as a session member, after scaling back to part-time membership in the band due to family commitments.

The first video of the album was for the song "Year of the Rat," released on 12 August 2010.

== Track listing ==
No.	Title	Lyrics	Music	Length
1.	"Year of the Rat"	Bergøy	Hidle/Vistnes/Demurtas	4:35
2.	"Protection"	Bergøy	Hidle/Vistnes/Demurtas	4:15
3.	"Patriot Games"	Bergøy	Hidle/Vistnes	3:27
4.	"The Passing"	Lie Jr./Fredrik Sele/Demurtas	Hidle/Vistnes/Demurtas	4:48
5.	"Exile"	Bergøy	Hidle/Vistnes/Demurtas	4:26
6.	"Sirens"	Bergøy	Hidle/Vistnes/Demurtas	4:27
7.	"Vulture"	Hidle/Lie Jr.	Vistnes/Sorychta/Vegge/Nordhus	3:43
8.	"Amnesia"	Vistnes/Lie Jr.	Hidle/Vistnes	4:54
9.	"Magical Fix"	Lie Jr.	Vistnes/Hidle/Lie Jr./Sorychta	4:20
10.	"Illumination"	Bergøy	Moen	8:13

Digipak edition bonus track
No.	Title	Lyrics	Music	Length
7.	"The Emerald Piper"	Bergøy	Hidle/Vistnes	3:06

Japanese edition bonus track (includes digipak edition bonus track)
No.	Title	Length
12.	"Caprice"	3:38

== Charts ==
Chart (2010)	Peak position
Belgian Albums Chart (Wallonia)	74
Swiss Albums Chart	95

== Release history ==
Country	Date
Spain	25 August 2010
Germany, Austria, Switzerland, Benelux, Italy, Sweden	27 August 2010
Rest of Europe	30 August 2010
US, Canada	31 August 2010

== Personnel ==
=== Tristania ===
- Mariangela Demurtas – Vocals
- Kjetil Nordhus – Vocals
- Anders Høyvik Hidle – Guitars & Harsh Vocals
- Ole Vistnes – Bass / Backing Vocals
- Gyri Smørdal Losnegaard – Guitars
- Einar Moen – Synths / Programming
- Tarald Lie Jr. – Drums

=== Session members ===
- Østen Bergøy – clean vocals
- Pete Johansen – violin
- Sigmund Olgart Vegge – additional harsh vocals on "Vulture"

== Production ==
- Drums recorded in Tanken Studio, Oslo by Fredrik Wallumrød, January 2010
- Guitars, bass and violin recorded in K-Lab Studio, Stavanger by Anders Høyvik Hidle & Ole Vistnes, February 2010
- Vocals recorded in Amadeus Studio, Oslo by Sigmund Olgart Vegge & Waldemar Sorychta, February & March 2010
- Mixed by Waldemar Sorychta and Dennis Koehne in Flying Pigs Studio, April 2010
- Mastered by Svante Forsbäck @ Chartmakers (www.chartmakers.fi), May 2010
- Produced by Anders Høyvik Hidle & Ole Vistnes
- Co-produced by Waldemar Sorychta
- All songs arranged by Waldemar Sorychta and Tristania
- Published by Sony ATV Publishing © 2010
- Photos and front cover artwork by angst-im-wald (www.angst-im-wald.com)
- Booklet design by Tinko Georgiev
