= Vibeke Stene =

Norwegian singer and actress

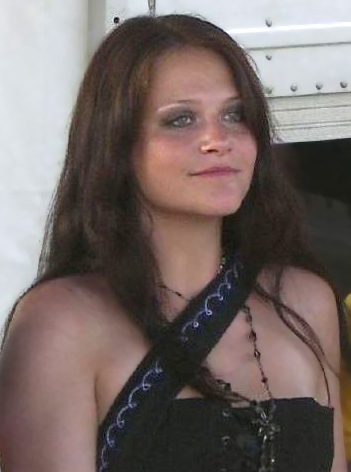
- Vibeke Stene in 2006

Background information
- Born: Vibeke Stene; 17 August 1978 (age 47)
- Origin: Sokndal Municipality, Rogaland, Norway
- Genres: Gothic metal, Doom metal, Extreme metal, Symphonic metal
- Occupation: Singer
- Instrument: Vocals
- Years active: 1996–2007; 2013–present
- Labels: Napalm Records; SPV; Crime Records
- Member of: Veil of Secrets
- Formerly of: Tristania
- Website: Official FB page Official band website

Vibeke Stene (born 17 August 1978) is a Norwegian soprano and actress. She is best known as a former member of gothic metal band Tristania, which she joined in 1996 and appeared with on five albums. The band became "one of the world's premiere goth metal bands".

In 2007, Stene left Tristania and temporarily retired from the music industry to start a family and teach singing. In 2013, Stene came out of retirement with a guest appearance for the band God of Atheists. She later worked in musical theater and formed doom metal band Veil of Secrets.

== Early life ==
Stene was born in Sokndal Municipality in Rogaland, Norway to Steinar Stene and Sissel Bø Stene. She has two sisters named Ingvild and Maiken. She first performed for people outside her family at the age of three. She began taking singing lessons at age 13, and became interested in classical singing. In an interview, she stated that her influences were the people with whom she had performed personally. Stene has also cited Tori Amos, Björk, David Bowie, Tom Waits, and Diamanda Galás as "only a few of many singers that I think are very good".

During her school years, Stene performed in jazz, folk, and classical concerts as a solo artist and with various bands. Around age 17, she became interested in heavy metal singing when she started "to know my inner melancholy". She was inspired to join a band after seeing Theatre of Tragedy live in Stavanger. She took vocal lessons until age 23, long after she had become a professional singer, because she wanted to learn how to teach others to sing.

Tristania keyboardist Einar Moen stated in an interview that Stene "has a classical education actually – sort of an opera school or university degree. And she has also taken singing lessons since she was a little girl, so she's always sung."

== Career ==
=== 1996–2007: Tristania ===
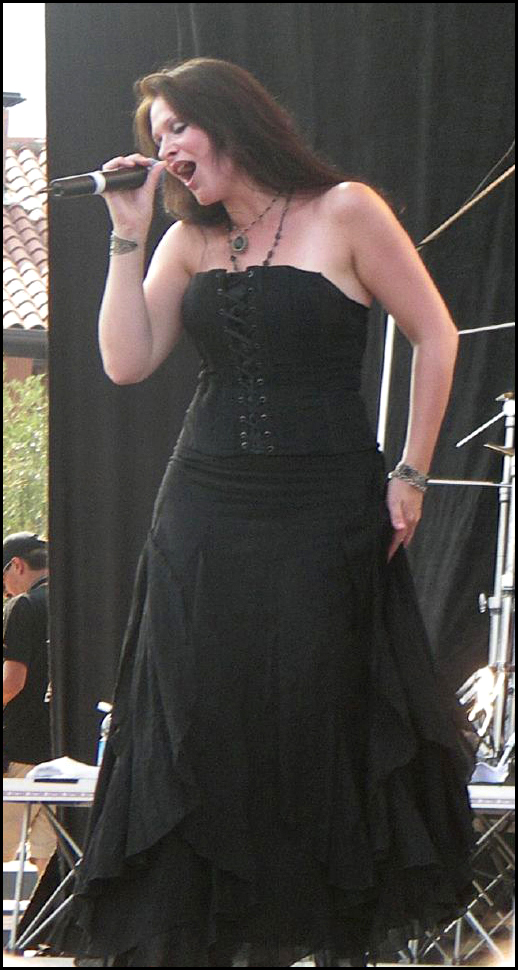
Vibeke Stene performing at a Tristania concert, 2006

Stene met the members of Tristania through a friend and saw them again at a music contest. She joined the band at age 18 while still in school. At that time, Tristania was planning to record their first demo. At first the band intended her to be a temporary guest vocalist. According to Stene, she did not know she was an official member of the band until she read an article about them after Widow's Weeds was released.

After five albums with Tristania, Stene left the band in February 2007 to finish her university degree which she started but did not finish in 2000, and also because she did not like the direction of the band's recent music. Coincidentally, singer Tarja Turunen had left the Finnish symphonic metal band Nightwish around the same time, leading to widespread speculation that Stene would be her replacement, and Stene had to announce that this was merely a rumor.

=== 2007–2012: Retirement ===
In the years after she left Tristania, Stene retired from the music industry. She gave birth to two children and taught singing during her retirement. In a 2010 interview, Stene was asked if she would sing professionally again. She declared that when given a good offer, she would take it. In 2011, the electronic band Plutho released a song called "Queen of Broken Hearts" featuring Stene, though it was recorded back in 1999.

=== 2013–present: Return to music ===
In June 2013, Stene announced on Facebook that she was returning to the music scene. Her first new music activity was an appearance with the extreme metal project God of Atheists, formed by Asgeir Mickelson. In 2015 she wrote and sang one song for the gothic metal band Viper Solfa on their debut album Carving an Icon.

Stene also ventured into theater work. She appeared in a play titled Skammens Gissel (Hostage of Shame) in which she played the role of Silja. Her theater debut was in October 2015. She described the play and her character:

Silja made the choice to move away from her husband and her children to a collective of German soldiers. By the war's end, she traveled with one of the soldiers back to his homeland. After a few years her son decided to track down his mother. He found her in Germany and brought her home to Norway in secret. In the south of Norway Silja becomes hostage, caught in her own home by shame. Her son have to bear the secret alone. The drama plays out in the home between mother and son and those out on the street, the free – or unfree.

In July 2020, Stene announced the formation of a new doom metal band called Veil of Secrets with Asgeir Mickelson. The band's debut album Dead Poetry was released in November 2020. According to Stene, "After some years with no music production or dissemination, I strongly felt an inner longing to create and feel alive through music. So I started to seek a resolution. [...] The composing process of' Dead Poetry was deeply founded on honesty and trust, and therefore I'm very proud to finally share Veil of Secrets."

== Discography ==
=== Tristania ===
==== Demos ====
- Tristania (1997)

==== Albums ====
- Widow's Weeds (1998)
- Beyond the Veil (1999)
- World of Glass (2001)
- Ashes (2005)
- Illumination (2007)

==== Live albums ====
- Widow's Tour (1999)
- Widow's Tour/Angina (1999)

==== Compilation albums ====
- Midwintertears / Angina (2001)
- Midwinter Tears (2005)

=== Veil of Secrets ===
==== Albums ====
- Dead Poetry (2020)

=== Guest vocal appearances ===
- Green Carnation - Journey to the End of the Night (1999)
- Samael - Solar Soul (2007)
- Plutho - Bob, You Don't Wanna Go There! (2011)
