= Ashes (Tristania album) =

4th studio album by Tristania

Studio album by Tristania
- Released: February 1, 2005
- Recorded: April–June and October 2004 at TopRoom Studio in Lunner, Norway
- Genre: Gothic metal
- Length: 49:18
- Label: SPV/Steamhammer
- Producers: Tristania, Børge Finstad

Tristania chronology
World of Glass (2001)	Ashes (2005)	Illumination (2007)

Professional ratings
Review scores
Source	Rating
Allmusic	4/5 stars
Kerrang!	4/5 stars
Rough Edge	3.5/4 stars

Ashes is the fourth full-length album by the Norwegian band Tristania. The album marks a change in the band's musical style, leaving out the choirs and introducing a heavier sound, with a focus on darker lyrics and the clean vocals of Vibeke Stene. This album is the only one Kjetil Ingebrethsen performed harsh vocals on.

== Track listing ==
All music and lyrics by Tristania, except where noted.

No.	Title	Length
1.	"Libre" (lyrics by Kjartan Hermansen)	4:30
2.	"Equilibrium"	5:49
3.	"The Wretched" (lyrics by Hermansen)	7:00
4.	"Cure"	5:59
5.	"Circus" (lyrics by Hermansen)	5:09
6.	"Shadowman"	6:31
7.	"The Gate"	6:45
8.	"Endogenisis"	7:37
Total length:		49:18

Digipak/jewel case/special North American/Japanese edition bonus track
No.	Title	Length
9.	"Bird"	5:09
Total length:		54:27

- In the first Ashes edition, "The Gate" was absent.
- Special Enhanced North American Edition includes the videoclip of "Equilibrium".
- Kjartan Hermansen was Tristania's webmaster at that time.

== Charts ==
Chart (2005)	Peak position
French Albums Chart	184

== Personnel ==
=== Tristania ===
- Vibeke Stene – vocals
- Østen Bergøy – clean vocals
- Kjetil Ingebrethsen – harsh vocals, aad. guitar, acoustic guitar
- Anders Høyvik Hidle – guitars, additional vocals
- Rune Østerhus – bass
- Einar Moen – synth, programming, additional vocals
- Kenneth Olsson – drums

=== Session Members ===
- Hans Josef Groh – Cello on "The Wretched", "Shadowman", and "Endogenisis" (Recorded in Fagerborg Studio, Norway)

== Production ==
- Produced and mixed By Tristania & Borge Finstad
- Recorded and engineered By Borge Finstad & Drajevolitch
- Mastered by Morten Lund
