= Widow's Weeds (Tristania album) =

Studio album by Tristania
- Released: 9 March 1998
- Recorded: November and December 1997
- Studios: Sound Suite Studio, Norway
- Genres: Gothic metal, symphonic metal
- Length: 53:07
- Label: Napalm
- Producers: Tristania & Terje Refsnes

Tristania chronology
Tristania (EP) (1997)	Widow's Weeds (1998)	Beyond the Veil (1999)

Professional ratings
Review scores
Source	Rating
Chronicles of Chaos	9/10
Metal Storm	10/10
Rock Hard	9.0/10

Widow's Weeds is the first full-length album by Norwegian gothic metal band Tristania.

== Track listing ==
All lyrics are written by Morten Veland; all music is composed by Tristania.

No.	Title	Length
1.	"Preludium..." (Instrumental)	1:09
2.	"Evenfall"	6:51
3.	"Pale Enchantress"	6:31
4.	"December Elegy"	7:31
5.	"Midwintertears"	8:32
6.	"Angellore"	7:16
7.	"My Lost Lenore"	6:23
8.	"Wasteland's Caress"	7:40
9.	"...Postludium" (Instrumental)	1:12
Total length:		53:07

Limited Edition
No.	Title	Length
10.	"Sirene" (Instrumental)	3:22
11.	"Cease to Exist"	9:17
Total length:		65:46

== Personnel ==
Tristania

- Vibeke Stene – soprano, choir
- Morten Veland – harsh vocals, guitars, choir
- Anders H. Hidle – guitars, choir
- Rune Østerhus – bass
- Einar Moen – synth, programming
- Kenneth Olsson – drums, choir

Additional musicians

- Østen Bergøy – clean vocals on "Angellore", choir
- Pete Johansen – violin
- Hilde Egeland, Marita Herikstad, Hilde T. Bommen – choir

Production

- Terje Refsnes – producer, engineer, mixing
- Sindre Y. Kristoffersen – cover design
