= World of Glass (album) =

Studio album by Tristania
- Released: 25 September 2001
- Recorded: February to April 2001
- Studios: Sound Suite Studio in Marseille, France
- Genres: Symphonic metal, gothic metal
- Length: 55:40
- Label: Napalm
- Producer: Terje Refsnes

Tristania chronology
Beyond the Veil (1999)	World of Glass (2001)	Ashes (2005)

Professional ratings
Review scores
Source	Rating
Chronicles of Chaos	8/10
Rough Edge	3.5/4 stars
Rock Hard	9.5/10

World of Glass is the third full-length album by Norwegian band Tristania. The album was released on 25 September 2001 by Napalm Records. As a result of Morten Veland leaving the band, the harsh vocals were sung by Ronny Thorsen, vocalist of Trail of Tears.

== Track listing ==
No.	Title	Lyrics	Music	Length
1.	"The Shining Path"	Østen Bergøy, Einar Moen	Anders Hidle, Moen	6:46
2.	"Wormwood"	Bergøy	Hidle, Moen	5:56
3.	"Tender Trip on Earth"	Bergøy	Hidle, Moen	5:18
4.	"Lost"	Pete Johansen	Hidle, Moen	6:03
5.	"Deadlocked"	Moen	Hidle, Moen	5:57
6.	"Selling Out"	Bergøy	Hidle, Moen	6:16
7.	"Hatred Grows"	Bergøy	Hidle, Moen	6:20
8.	"World of Glass"	Bergøy	Hidle, Moen	5:25
9.	"Crushed Dreams"	Moen	Hidle, Moen	7:39
Total length:				55:40

Digipak
No.	Title	Lyrics	Music	Length
10.	"The Modern End" (Seigmen cover)	Kim Ljung	Ljung	4:45
Total length:				60:25

== Personnel ==
Tristania

- Vibeke Stene – vocals, choir
- Anders Høyvik Hidle – guitars, harsh vocals on "The Shining Path" and "Tender Trip on Earth"
- Rune Østerhus – bass
- Einar Moen – synth/programming
- Kenneth Olsson – drums

Additional musicians

- Østen Bergøy – clean vocals
- Ronny Thorsen – harsh vocals
- Pete Johansen – violin
- Jan Kenneth Barkved – clean vocals on "Selling Out" and "Crushed Dreams"
- Sandrine Lachapelle, Emilie Lesbros, Johanna Giraud, Damien Surian, Hubert Piazzola – choir

== Charts ==
Chart (2001)	Peak position
German Albums Chart	66
