= The Sins of Thy Beloved =

Norwegian death-doom/gothic metal band

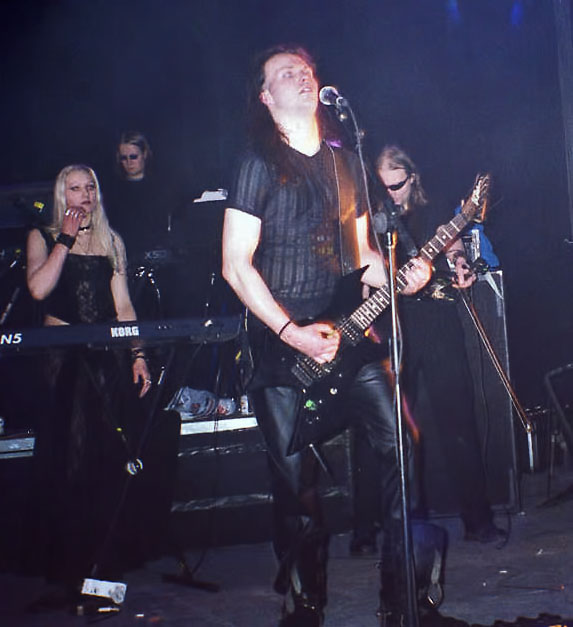
- Band members 2001

Background information
- Origin: Bryne, Norway
- Genres: Gothic metal Death-doom; Symphonic metal
- Years active: 1996–2008
- Labels: Napalm, SPV
- Past members: See below

The Sins of Thy Beloved was a death-doom/gothic metal band from Bryne, Norway, founded in 1996.

== Biography ==
The band was formed in November 1996 by Glenn Morten Nordbø, Arild Christensen, and Stig Johansen. The band was initially called Purgatory, but they soon decided to change their name to something less common. Anita Auglend and Ola Aarrestad joined the band shortly thereafter, and they recorded their first demo All Alone in January–February 1997.

Anders Thue and Ingfrid Stensland then joined before they recorded their second demo Silent Pain in January 1998. Pete Johansen played the violin on that demo, although he did not officially join the band until the recording of their first full-length album Lake of Sorrow later in 1998. The album was rated a nine out of ten by Chronicles of Chaos.

They toured across Europe, before recording their second full-length album Perpetual Desolation in 2000. During the following tour, Anita Auglend, Anders Thue, and Ingfrid Stensland grew weary of traveling and left the band in 2001. A live performance was released on CD and VHS in 2001, but it was not distributed worldwide and is thus very hard to come by.

The band has been dormant since the departure of its three members. Pete Johansen has since left to play the violin on several Tristania and Sirenia albums. In 2007, it was rumored that Anita Auglend had returned to the band, although these rumors were never confirmed. It was eventually revealed in a blog interview conducted by Class of Sounds with Pete Johansen that the band actually had dissolved in 2002.

In 2013, band members Anders Thue and Stig Johansen formed the band Savn with Midnattsol singer Carmen Elise Espenæs. In 2016, guitarist, composer, and vocalist Arild Christensen formed the band Rainarea with Nelly Khosrovyan.

== Style ==
The Sins of Thy Beloved are often compared to gothic metal bands such as Tristania and early Theatre of Tragedy, mainly because of the band's combination of a female soprano voice with male death grunt; this trait is common to gothic metal in general, and is known as "beauty and the beast" vocals. Their music features death-doom rhythmics enhanced by the prominent use of violins, especially on the Lake of Sorrow album, typical of many gothic doom bands. Their live recordings offer a sound closer to traditional death metal than their studio albums, which make heavy use of arrangements and effects.

== Line-up ==
=== Last known line-up ===
- Anita Auglend – vocals (1996–2001, 2007–2008)
- Glenn Morten Nordbø – guitars, harsh vocals (1996–2008)
- Arild Christensen – guitar, backing vocals (1996–2008)
- Ola Aarrestad – bass (1996–2008)
- Stig Johansen – drums (1996–2008)
- Maiken Olaisen – keyboards (2005–2008)

=== Former members ===
- Anders Thue – keyboards (1997–2001; 2005–2008 live)
- Ingfrid Stensland – keyboards (1997–2001)
- Pete Johansen – violin (1998–2001)
- Hege-Marie Aanby – vocals (2001)
- Mona Wallin – vocals (2005)

== Discography ==
Studio albums

- Lake of Sorrow (1998)
- Perpetual Desolation (2000)

Live albums

- Live (2002)

Video albums

- Perpetual Desolation Live (2001)

EPs

- All Alone (1997)

Demo albums

- The Sins of Thy Beloved (1997)
