= Tristania (band) =

Norwegian gothic metal band

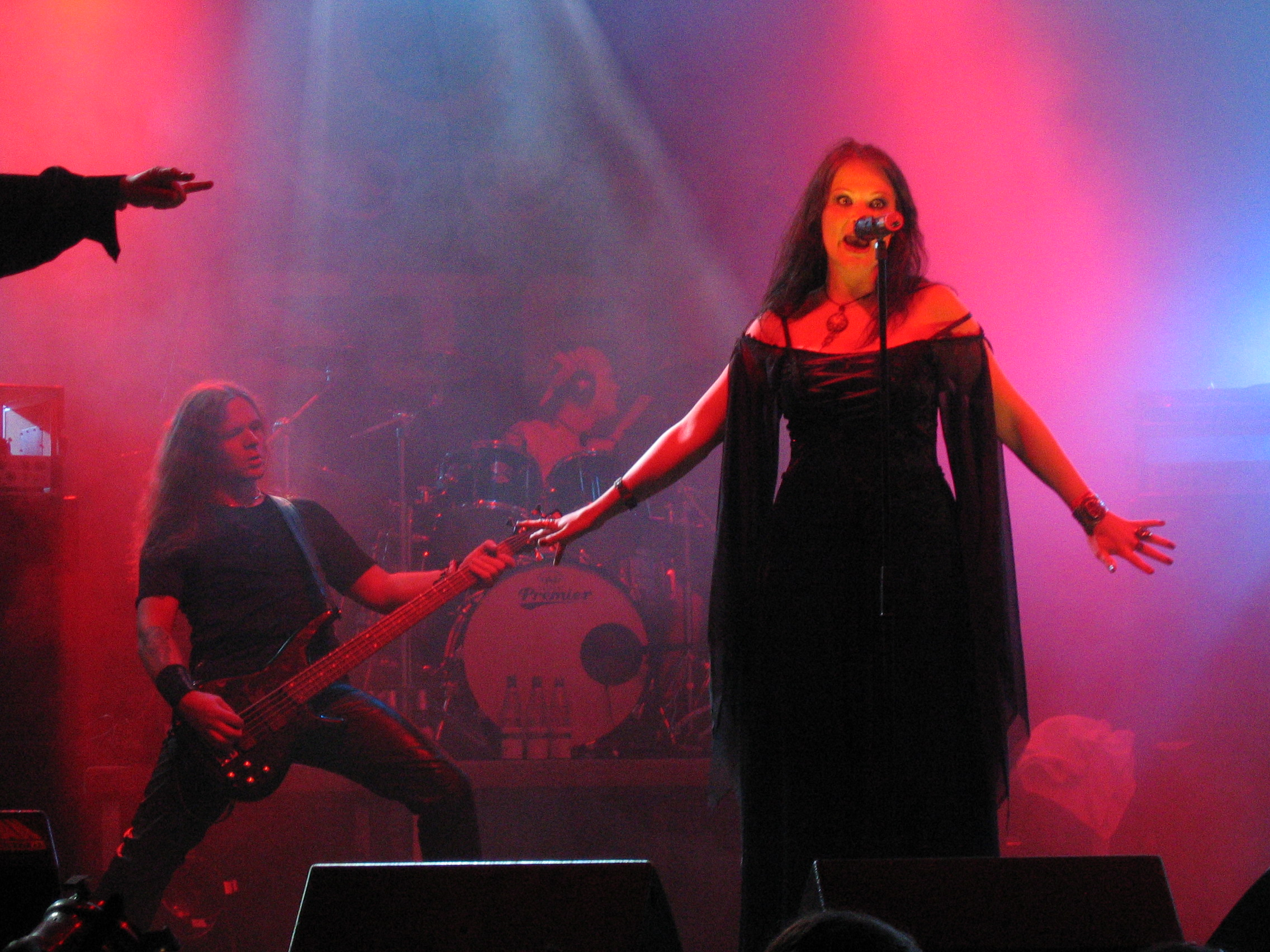
- Tristania live in Germany, 2005

Background information
- Origin: Stavanger, Norway
- Genres: Gothic metal; death-doom; symphonic metal
- Years active: 1996–2022
- Labels: Napalm Records; SPV
- Past members: Einar Moen; Anders Høyvik Hidle; Morten Veland; Kjetil Ingebrethsen; Vibeke Stene; Svein Terje Solvang; Rune Østerhus; Østen Bergøy; Kenneth Olsson; Mariangela Demurtas; Kjetil Nordhus; Gyri Smørdal Losnegaard; Ole Vistnes; Tarald Lie Jr.
- Website: tristania.com

Tristania was a Norwegian gothic metal band formed in 1996 by Morten Veland, Einar Moen and Kenneth Olsson. Tristania's music is usually classified as gothic metal. Their songs largely dealt with dark and sentimental topics, including depression, sadness, suicide, love, absence, and anger.

The band had not had any known activity from 2016 to October 2018, when they announced that they would perform at 70000 Tons of Metal in early 2019. In 2022, they announced they had disbanded.

== History ==
=== Background ===
In 1992, Morten Veland and Kenneth Olsson formed Uzi Suicide. Since Veland was getting more interested in the UK gothic scene, his songwriting began to take a darker feel. Fragments of the band later became Tristania.

=== Founding and Widow's Weeds, 1996–1998 ===
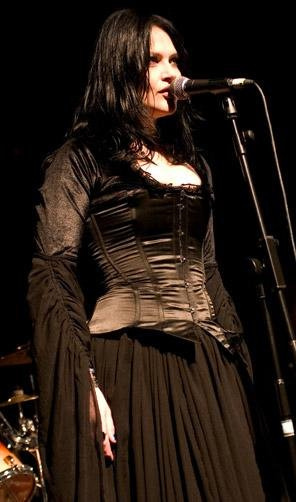
Vibeke Stene joined Tristania at the age of 18, and was the band's soprano vocalist for over a decade.

Tristania was founded in Stavanger, Norway by Einar Moen (keyboards), Morten Veland (vocals/guitar), and Kenneth Olsson (drums) in 1996. A few weeks later Anders Høyvik Hidle (guitars/vocals) and Rune Østerhus (bass) joined the band. Vibeke Stene was initially recruited as a guest singer for the demo recording in 1997, but she later joined as a regular member. According to Stene, she did not know she was in the band until she read an interview after Widow's Weeds was released. In May 1997, the band entered the studio for the first time and recorded their demo in Klepp Lydstudio. During the summer of 1997 different labels showed interest in the demo. Tristania signed with Napalm Records and released the EP Tristania.

Tristania's first full-length album, Widow's Weeds, was recorded at the end of 1997 and released early 1998. Two guest performers who were involved in Widow's Weeds would later get more prominent roles on Tristania's albums; singer Østen Bergøy (who would later become a full band member) and violinist Pete Johansen. Tristania got to do their first shows outside of Norway as support act for Lacrimosa in Belgium and at the Mind over Matter festival in Austria in August 1998. Later the same year Tristania went on their first European tour, with Solefald and Haggard.

=== Beyond the Veil, 1999–2000 ===
The band's second full-length album Beyond the Veil was released in 1999. As on the debut album, Moen and Veland wrote the majority of the music, but Moen and Hidle emerged as a songwriting team. Tristania went on their first headlining tour with The Sins of Thy Beloved, Trail of Tears and Antichrisis as support acts. The band also toured with Tiamat and Anathema in 1999. The band continued touring extensively in 2000. In December 2000 Veland and the rest of the band agreed on going separate ways, due to musical and personal differences.

=== World of Glass, 2001–2002 ===
World of Glass was released in September 2001, with guest contributions from Ronny Thorsen, Johansen, and Barkved. The album added classical and industrial elements to Tristania's sound, and included the band's only cover version: "The Modern End," originally by Seigmen. Bergøy, now a permanent member of the band, also began to write lyrics on this album and became the band's main lyricist. Kjetil Ingebrethsen joined the band prior to the World of Glass tour on extreme vocals. On that tour Tristania was supported by Rotting Christ, Vintersorg, and Madder Mortem. More touring of Europe and Latin America followed in 2002.

=== Break, 2003–2004 ===
For over two years (between 2003 and 2004), the band took a break from performing live to focus solely on songwriting.

=== Ashes 2005–2006 ===
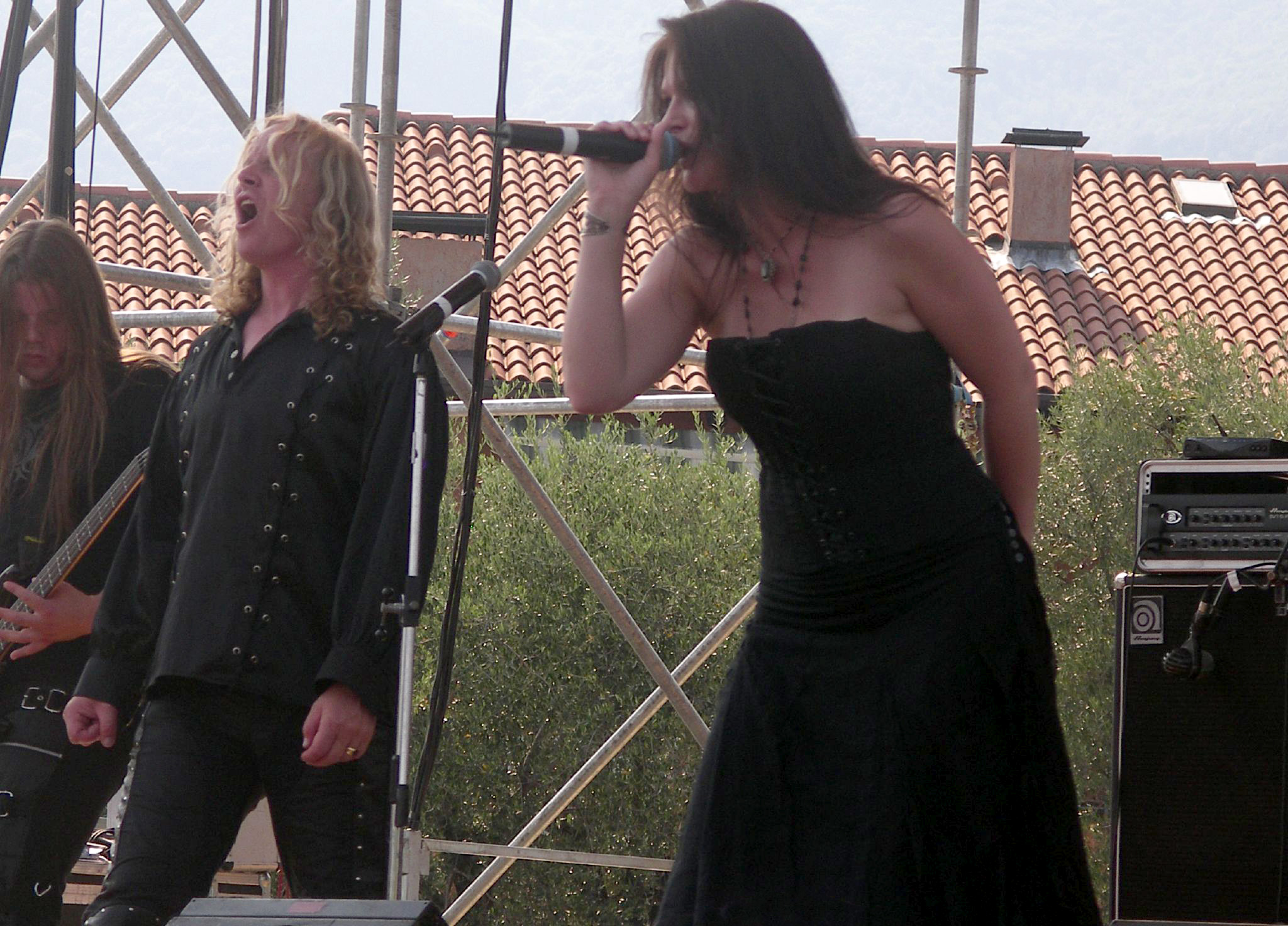
Vibeke Stene and Østen Bergøy during a concert at the Evolution Festival, 2006

Ashes was released on SPV/Steamhammer Records in February 2005 and featured a stripped-down sound that de-emphasized the classical and operatic elements of the previous albums. The band then toured Europe and Latin America (sometimes without Moen, who chose to remain at home and focus on songwriting) along with Nightwish, Gothminister, and Kreator. After the tours, Ingebrethsen decided to leave the band as he wanted to continue his musical career at a lower level. The band decided not to recruit a replacement, and Hidle took over the growling vocals.

=== Illumination 2007 ===
Tristania's fifth album, Illumination, was released in January 2007, with touring guitarist Svein Terje Solvang added as an official member. Vorph of Samael appeared as a guest singer and a string quartet appeared on several songs. Shortly after the release of the album, Vibeke Stene suddenly decided to quit her musical career in order to focus on family and her work as a teacher. As a result, all planned touring activities were put on hold. In spring 2007, a few months after Stene left Tristania, the Finnish symphonic metal band Nightwish were going to announce the name of their new female vocalist. Due to Stene's recent departure from Tristania, it was widely discussed in the musical circles whether Vibeke would be inducted into Nightwish to replace Tarja Turunen. The rumor was quickly denied, however, when Stene said in an interview, "I am not the new singer in Nightwish."

After holding auditions for a singer with a voice different than Stene's, Tristania recruited singer Mariangela Demurtas from Sardinia, Italy, who officially joined the band in October 2007.

=== Rubicon 2008–2012 ===
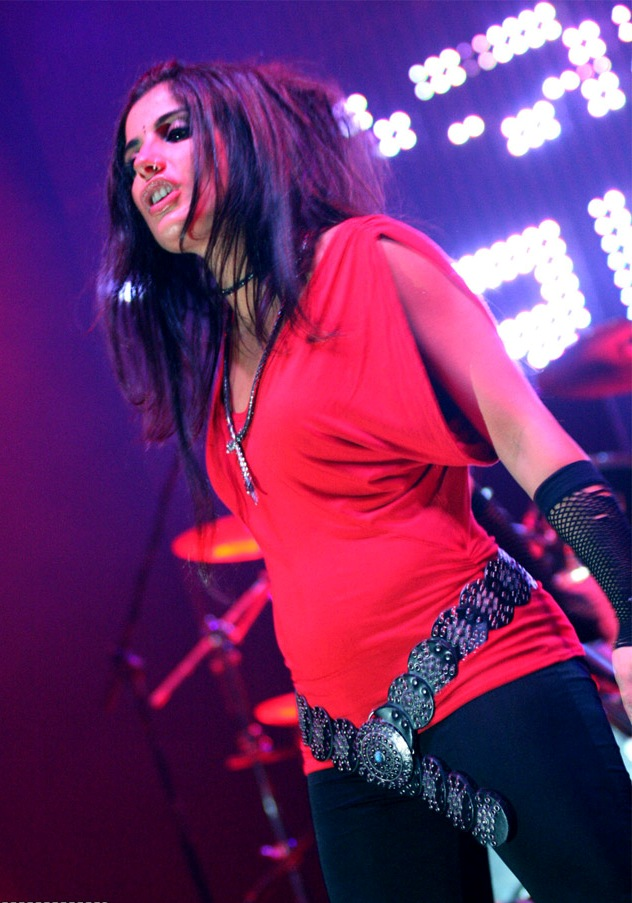
Italian vocalist Mariangela Demurtas joined Tristania in 2007.

Østerhus and Solvang both quit the band in 2008. Ole Vistnes joined as the new bassist and Gyri Losnegaard later joined as second guitarist. The new line-up featuring Demurtas on vocals debuted on 29 February 2008 at a festival appearance in Kyiv, Ukraine. The next member to depart was drummer Kenneth Olsson, who was replaced by Tarald Lie; while singer Østen Bergøy scaled back to part-time status with the band due to family commitments. Kjetil Nordhus was added to the lineup on clean vocals. The band's sixth album, Rubicon, was released on 25 August 2010.

After the Out of the Dark Festival on 2 October 2011, the Hungarian Lambda Team released a freeware PC game about Tristania, named Tristania 3D.

On 15 December, the band confirmed a new full-length album on their website for late May 2013, which was going to be called Darkest White.

=== Darkest White, inactivity, and disbandment 2013–2022 ===
Darkest White was recorded in January 2013. The album was critically well received, and often considered the "real come back" for the band after former vocalist Vibeke Stene left the band in 2007. Sputnikmusic stated that with Darkest White "they have actually outdone themselves," while "being the same band who released Rubicon." The album was praised for its "exploration of dark, desolate beauty" mood and "emotional thread". Another aspect that was well received was the "flawlessly accomplished" three-vocalist style driven throughout the album with the harsh vocals from Anders H. Hidle, the clean vocals from the returning Kjetil Nordhus, and Mariangela Demurtas' female vocals. The combination of these three vocalists was considered "intelligent" and "diligent."

During their long hiatus between 2016 and 2018, the band not had any known activity, while some of their members joined other musical projects. Tristania returned to the stage in 2018 for some occasional shows, not including new songs.

Finally, on 17 September 2022, Tristania announced their official disbandment, due to an unspecified "medical situation in near family within the band" resulting in the scheduled tour of Latin America in December 2022 being cancelled.

== Music ==
Tristania stood apart from the other bands of the genre with their use of three distinct vocal styles in the "operatic soprano Vibeke Stene, clean-singing baritone Østen Bergøy, and harsh, black metal-style shrieker Morten Veland". Their second album Beyond the Veil in 1999 made use of a ten members choir and featured violin passages from Pete Johansen of The Sins of Thy Beloved, earning "rave reviews" across Europe. By then, the band had risen to "the top of the goth metal heap" with their "lush, symphonically enhanced" approach. They were "dealt a potentially crippling blow" when singer, guitarist and principal composer Veland left the group to form Sirenia. Tristania continued to prosper with subsequent releases and has since been "regarded as one of the world's premiere goth metal bands".

== Band members ==
=== Final known lineup ===
- Einar Moen – keyboards, programming (1996–2022)
- Anders Høyvik Hidle – lead guitar (1996–2022), harsh vocals (2006–2022)
- Mariangela Demurtas – female vocals (2007–2022)
- Ole Vistnes – bass, backing vocals (2009–2022, touring member 2008–2009)
- Gyri Smørdal Losnegaard – rhythm guitar (2009–2022)
- Tarald Lie Jr. – drums (2010–2022, touring member 2005–2010)
- Kjetil Nordhus – clean vocals, acoustic guitar (2010–2022, touring member 2009–2010)

=== Former ===
- Morten Veland – harsh vocals, rhythm guitar (1996–2000)
- Rune Østerhus – bass (1996–2009)
- Kenneth Olsson – drums, backing vocals (1996–2010)
- Vibeke Stene – female vocals (1997–2007)
- Kjetil Ingebrethsen – harsh vocals, acoustic guitar (2001–2005)
- Østen Bergøy – clean vocals (2001–2010, session member 1998–2001)
- Svein Terje Solvang – rhythm guitar, harsh vocals (2005–2008, touring member 2004–2005)

=== Touring ===
- Kjell Rune Hagen – bass (2005–2008)
- Jonathan A. Perez – drums (2005–2006, 2010)
- Pete Johansen – violin (2010–2011)

== Discography ==
=== Studio albums ===
- Widow's Weeds (1998)
- Beyond the Veil (1999)
- World of Glass (2001)
- Ashes (2005)
- Illumination (2007)
- Rubicon (2010)
- Darkest White (2013)
