= Gorgoroth discography =

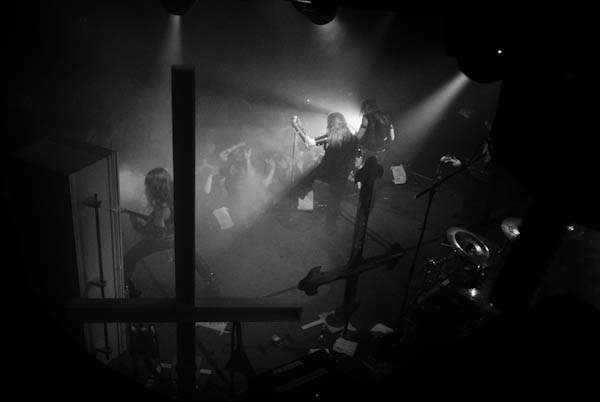
- Gorgoroth, live at Hole In The Sky 2009
- Studio albums: 9
- Extended plays: 2
- Live albums: 3
- Video albums: 1
- Other appearances: 8

Gorgoroth is a Norwegian black metal band founded by Infernus.

== Studio albums ==
1994	Pentagram: Released: October 12, 1994; Label: Embassy Records; Formats: Compact Disc, Cassette, Vinyl
1996	Antichrist: Released: June 3, 1996; Label: Embassy Records; Formats: CD, Vinyl
1997	Under the Sign of Hell: Released: October 20, 1997; Label: Malicious Records; Formats: CD, Vinyl
1998	Destroyer: Released: May 18, 1998; Label: Nuclear Blast; Formats: CD
2000	Incipit Satan: Released: February 7, 2000; Label: Nuclear Blast; Formats: CD
2003	Twilight of the Idols: Released: August 12, 2003; Label: Nuclear Blast; Formats: CD
2006	Ad Majorem Sathanas Gloriam: Released: July 25, 2006; Label: Candlelight Records; Formats: CD
2009	Quantos Possunt ad Satanitatem Trahunt: Released: November 11, 2009; Label: Regain Records; Formats: CD, Vinyl
2015	Instinctus Bestialis: Release: June 8, 2015; Label: Soulseller Records; Formats: CD, Vinyl, Digital

== Live albums ==
Year	Title	Peak chart positions	
Year	Title	NOR	SWE
1996	The Last Tormentor: Released: May 23, 1996; Label: Malicious Records; Formats: Compact Disc, Vinyl	—	—
2007	Bergen 1996: Released: November 2007; Label: Embassy Records; Formats: Compact Disc, Vinyl	—	—
2008	Black Mass Krakow 2004: Released: June 9, 2008; Label: Metal Mind Productions; Formats: DVD	3	15
2008	True Norwegian Black Metal – Live in Grieghallen: Released: June 23, 2008; Label: Regain Records; Formats: Compact Disc	—	—
"—" denotes a release that did not chart.

== Demos and promos ==
1993	A Sorcery Written in Blood: Released: April 28, 1993; Label: Self-released; Formats: Cassette
1994	Promo '94: Released: April 1994; Label: Self-released; Formats: Cassette

== Other appearances ==
Year	Title	Album	Ref.
1996	"Crushing the Scepter" (Originally on Pentagram)	Blackend: The Black Metal Compilation Volume 1	
1997	"Revelation of Doom" (Originally on Under the Sign of Hell)	Feuersturm	
1998	"Slottet i det fjerne" (Darkthrone cover)	Darkthrone Holy Darkthrone	
1998	"Destroyer" (Originally on Destroyer)	Feuersturm Volume II - The Ultimate Storm	
1999	"Destroyer" (Originally on Destroyer))	Death... Is Just the Beginning V	
1999	"Revelation of Doom" (live)	Death... Is Just the Beginning V (DVD)	
2000	"Incipit Satan" (Originally on Incipit Satan)	Death... Is Just the Beginning VI	
2001	"Life Eternal" (Mayhem cover)	Originators of the Northern Darkness – A Tribute to Mayhem	
