= Gorgoroth name dispute =

Legal dispute between Norwegian black-metal musicians

Infernus	Gaahl and King ov Hell

The Gorgoroth name dispute refers to a legal dispute between musicians from Norwegian black metal band Gorgoroth over who had ownership of the band's name, which was derived from J. R. R. Tolkien's legendarium. The parties to the dispute were band founder Infernus (Roger Tiegs) and members Gaahl (Kristian Espedal) and King ov Hell (Tom Cato Visnes). It began in October 2007, when it was announced that Gaahl and King had decided to part ways with Infernus, although the former two claimed to have "fired" the latter. The dispute was concluded in March 2009 when a court verdict recognising Infernus as the legitimate user of the name was announced, and the outcome of the dispute also established a precedent in Norway for subsequent similar disputes.

== Overview ==
=== Background ===
Gorgoroth was formed in 1992 by guitarist Infernus. Between 1993 and 1998, the band released one demo - A Sorcery Written in Blood (1993), three studio albums - Pentagram (1994), Antichrist (1996) and Under the Sign of Hell (1997), and one EP - The Last Tormentor (1996). Infernus wrote much of the material on Pentagram and the entirety of Antichrist and Under the Sign of Hell, and he performed the bass lines on the latter two albums. This period saw several line-up changes— as would happen throughout the band's history — as well as extensive live performances which included two European tours. The band was signed to the major German heavy metal record label Nuclear Blast after being approached by them on their headlining European tour in 1997. This would be crucial for Gorgoroth to earn the attention of a wider audience through Nuclear Blast's distribution facilities in the late 1990s and early 2000s.

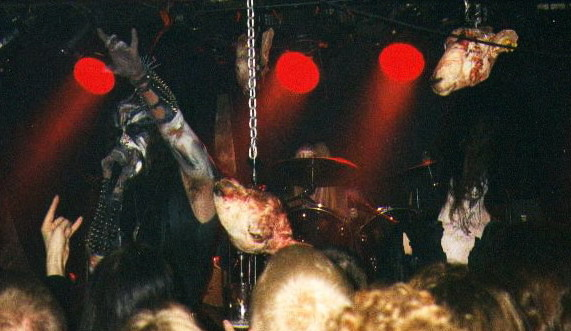
Gorgoroth live in Bergen, Norway - October 20, 2000. Gaahl and Infernus

Vocalist Gaahl joined Gorgoroth in 1998, and was heard on the title track of Destroyer (1998). Bassist King ov Hell joined the band in 1999 and made his studio debut on Incipit Satan (2000), which was also the first Gorgoroth album to feature Gaahl as the main vocalist. Between 2002 and 2004, King composed the Gorgoroth songs that would comprise the majority of those on Twilight of the Idols (2003) and the entirety of those on Ad Majorem Sathanas Gloriam (2006), the only Gorgoroth releases between 2000 and 2007. Gaahl wrote lyrics for two songs Incipit Satan, the majority of those on Twilight of the Idols and the entirety of those on Ad Majorem Sathanas Gloriam. By the summer of 2007, three songs written by King and five songs with lyrics written by Gaahl were played in live performances.

Although Infernus contributed little material to Twilight of the Idols and none to Ad Majorem Sathanas Gloriam, he conceived the titles of the albums, rooted in his Satanism and his influences by Friedrich Nietzsche. He also continued to participate in the production and mastering of Gorgoroth albums. His songs also continued to comprise the majority of the material performed live. He reportedly had begun work on new material for a new album in October 2006 and was first reported writing it in March 2007, the title for which he revealed to be Quantos Possunt ad Satanitatem Trahunt in October 2007. Furthermore, Infernus continued to promote the band and its releases in interviews and by other means such as the Ad Majorem Sathanas Gloriam listening session in Berlin, May 2006, as did King through interviews and seminars in the United States. The prominence of Infernus and King was further reinforced through their statuses as official band contacts as well as through the sleeves of albums such as Ad Majorem Sathanas Gloriam - Infernus in particular was emphasised as "Satan's Minister on Earth" and he was largely responsible for negotiations with Regain Records.

More controversy surrounded the band in this period, which resulted from a controversial performance in Kraków, Poland in 2004 after which the relations with Nuclear Blast ceased, Gaahl and Infernus receiving prison sentences for excessive violence and gross negligent rape respectively, and appearances made by Gaahl in the media. It was in part because of some of these events that Twilight of the Idols and Ad Majorem Sathanas Gloriam were the only Gorgoroth releases in this time period.

=== Claims of Gaahl and King ov Hell to the name ===
Publicly, Gaahl and King cited multiple reasons behind their decision to exclude founding member Infernus and work under the name Gorgoroth. The claims most frequently iterated throughout the dispute were allegations of Infernus investing no interest in promoting Gorgoroth or participating creatively, and that he was abusive and disrespectful towards promoters, session members and other working partners, while Gaahl and King had "creatively defined" Gorgoroth throughout a period of eight years. Other claims also included Gaahl's apparent objection to Infernus' support of the late Euronymous' Never Stop the Madness campaign through his now-defunct Deathlike Silence Productions label, while King felt averse to being with Infernus in the wake of the guitarist's rape allegations and eventual conviction for 'gross negligent rape'.

Their decision had been made by summer 2007, and it was in September that King — with the assistance of Anders Odden of Cadaver and Satyricon — filed a trademark application to Patentstyret for the name and logo of Gorgoroth.

=== Response of Infernus ===
Although Infernus declared he would not defend himself against any accusations about him raised throughout the dispute and did not directly counter the claims of Gaahl and King outside of formal environments, he nevertheless stated that he could be "difficult to work with", and stated that Gaahl and King should have decided to adopt a new name instead.

Meanwhile, Infernus' work on Quantos Possunt ad Satanitatem Trahunt had been reported various times in the media.

==== Claims ====
Select clauses of the Patentstyret Trademark Act, such as § 2. and § 14. 7., were cited in Infernus' favour throughout the dispute and determined the eventually concluded illegality and invalidity of King's trademark application, which also failed to satisfy § 8.:

§ 2. The exclusive right to a trademark may also be acquired without registration when the trademark is established by use. A trademark is considered to be established by use when it is well known within the circle of trade concerned in this country as a distinctive sign for someone's goods.

§ 14. A trademark may not be registered if: 7. it is liable to be confused with a trademark which someone else has started to use before the applicant, and the applicant was aware of this use when he filed his application for registration;

§ 8. Even though a registered trademark is liable to be confused with a sign which has an earlier right, it shall be allowed to co-exist validly with the latter, provided the application for registration was filed in good faith and the holder of the earlier right has knowingly tolerated the use of the later trademark in this country for five consecutive years from the date of registration.

=== Misconceptions ===
Frequent misconceptions perpetuated throughout the dispute by various media outlets such as Terrorizer Magazine were that the acceptance of King's trademark application by Patentstyret between December 2007–January 2008 was a court verdict, and that at least one lawsuit had taken place prior to the one Infernus filed in September 2008, which reached Oslo District Court in January 2009.

== History ==
=== Prelude (September 2007) ===
In September 2007, King, with the assistance of Anders Odden from Cadaver and Satyricon, filed a trademark application to Patenstyret for the name and logo of Gorgoroth.

=== Departure from Infernus (October–November 2007) ===
In October 2007, Infernus announced on the band's official Myspace page that "a decision to split up the band" had been made with him on one side, and Gaahl and King on the other. The statement explained that the members were unable to continue working together any longer and further noted that both sides intended to continue under the band's name. A statement from Gaahl and King was also issued on the same day. Gaahl issued another statement two days later claiming that the band had not split up but "continued on in a different form." The statement further claimed that Infernus had not been a creative force throughout the course of eight years and had "shown no interest in the art [of] defining Gorgoroth during that same period of time." Infernus responded on the following day with a statement noting that he claimed the legal right to band's name as "the founder and only original member of the band."

Gaahl and King announced that Hellhammer of Mayhem and Dimmu Borgir would join them on drums from the beginning of 2008, however this did not materialize for unknown reasons. Teloch of Nidingir (who had also previously been a live session member for Gorgoroth) and Nick Barker (formerly of Cradle of Filth and Dimmu Borgir) were also revealed as members of their touring line-up.

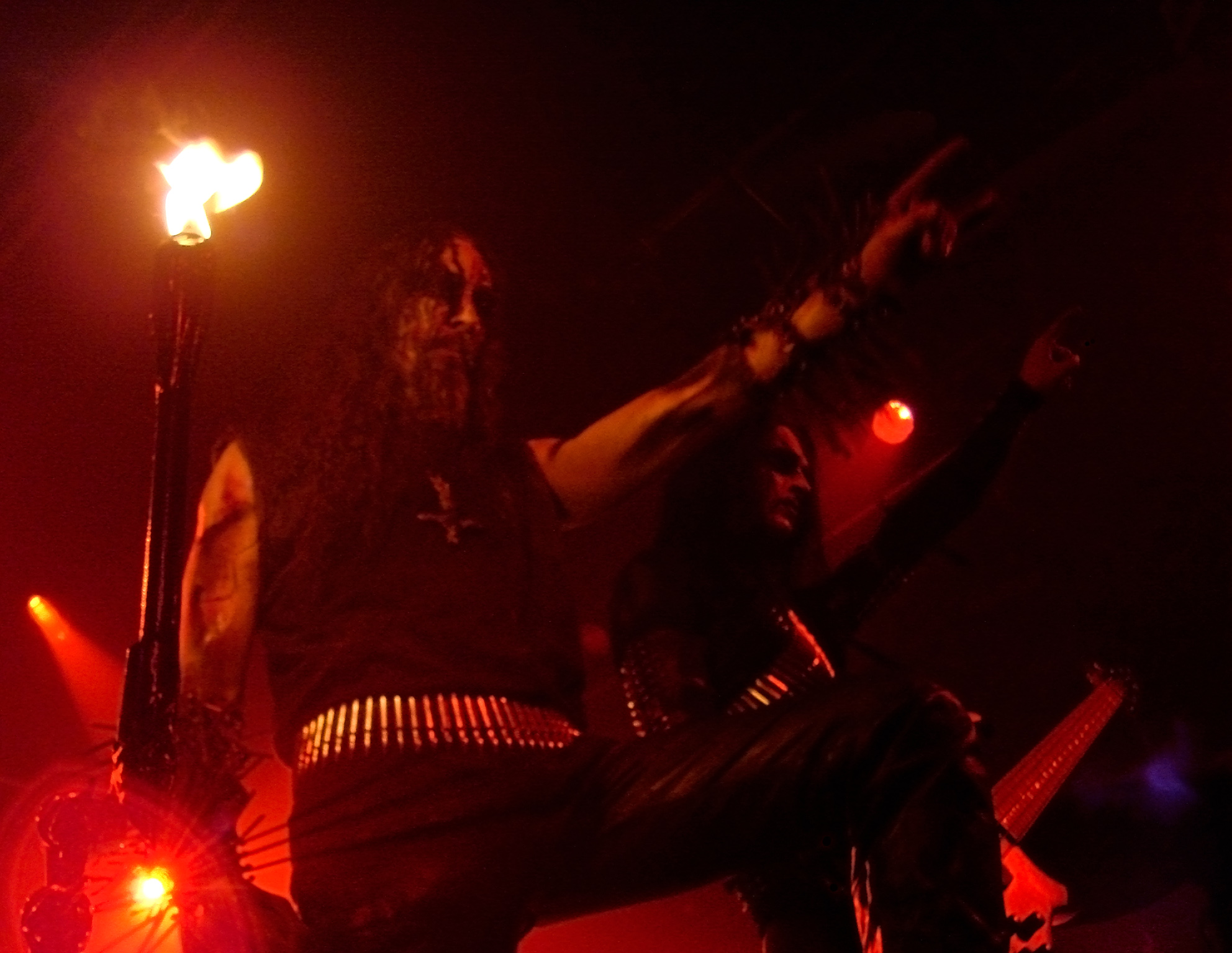
Gaahl (left) and King ov Hell (right) performing in November 2007.

Another statement (intended to be the 'last in a line of short open letters to the media') from Infernus arrived a week later claiming that Gaahl had "been considering quitting the band numerous times" while King had left the band the previous year "due to difficulties combining playing in a clear-cut Satanic metal band as Gorgoroth with the fact that he is full-time employed as a primary school teacher." Infernus further noted that as the band's founding member, he would "not agree on giving away the name [he] rightfully own[s] to [their] third vocalist and sixth or seventh (!) bass player for whatever reasons they might have." Furthermore, he said that he was in the process of finishing and preparing the material he reportedly started in October 2006 and was first reported writing when he was released on parole in March 2007, declaring the title to be Quantos Possunt ad Satanitatem Trahunt.

King's trademark application was revealed by Infernus to the public, and that this was done without the latter's knowledge. Infernus' attorney Egil Horstad of Vogt & Wiig warned Gaahl and King that this application was in abrogration of select sections of the Patentstyret Trademark Act. On their November European tour, which Gorgoroth had been scheduled to embark on several months before the split, Gaahl and King frequently used the name "The Force Gorgoroth", and there also existed a King ov Hell/Gaahl trademark application for this band name.

=== Acceptance of King's trademark application by Patentstyret (December 2007 – January 2008) ===
In December, Regain Records issued a press release announcing their decision to "continue the co-operation with the band's original member Infernus with a new line-up" and that the label recognised "Infernus as the rightful owner of the bands name, logo and trademark" as well as their preparation "to take any legal steps necessary to prevent any third party from exploiting it, artistically and commercially." A week later, Gaahl and King delivered a statement claiming that it had been "legally determined" by the Norwegian patent office that they retained "the rightful ownership and use of the name and logo, now and in the future." After the Patent Office's first department had thus accepted King's Gorgoroth trademark application, King and Gaahl withdrew their application for the trademark of "The Force Gorgoroth". The statement also declared that Gaahl and King had severed ties with Regain Records for "their disloyal acts" and were "carefully choosing a new label for the release of their next full-length album." Infernus subsequently declared that the Norwegian patent office decision would be appealed by Regain Records and himself.

=== Non-negotiable offer (March 2008) ===
In March 2008, Infernus announced that he hired additional lawyer Kate I Lohren of Onsagers AS and made a non-negotiable offer to Gaahl and King with a three-day deadline. The offer was not accepted and Infernus then declared that his attorney would appeal the Norwegian Patent Office decision and "commence legal proceedings in order to have the matter handled by the courts."

=== Live in Grieghallen (May–August 2008) ===
On May 30, 2008, Regain Records announced the June 2008 release of True Norwegian Black Metal - Live in Grieghallen, a new Gorgoroth album recorded live in studio. The recording line-up consisted of Infernus on guitars and bass, Gaahl on vocals, Teloch on session guitars, and Garghuf on session drums. In July 2008, Gaahl and King posted a MySpace bulletin announcing that "Swedish court authorities (Malmø tingrett)" had "sided with Gorgoroth copyright holders Gaahl and King" against Regain Records in halting the distribution of the album. According to the bulletin, Regain Records had "illegally removed King's bass tracks and mixed the recordings without the knowledge of Gaahl and King". King and Gaahl claimed that Regain Records thus broke their contract with them. The bulletin also announced that they planned on taking further action against Regain Records. The following day, Regain Records released a response to the announcement, stating that the ceasing and sales of marketing was "only an interemistic decision made by the court to stop all actions in regards of the album" until "the case is settled and there's no verdict made on the matter yet".

On August 12, 2008, Infernus issued a statement saying that the Gorgoroth trademark matter would not be decided until a verdict was made in a yet to-be-announced trial in Oslo, Norway, and that the conflict between Regain Records and Gaahl/King ov Hell about True Norwegian Black Metal - Live in Grieghallen would be decided in another to-be-announced trial in Malmö, Sweden; until then, a temporary injunction has stopped Regain Records from promoting and distributing the album.

Gaahl and King ov Hell stated that they would be entering the studio on August 25 to record a new album featuring Teloch as well as Ice Dale of Enslaved on guitars, and Frost of Satyricon and 1349 (who was also at different points a full-time and session member of Gorgoroth) on drums.

By October 2008, everything except the vocals had been recorded for the new album of Gaahl and King that in the aftermath of the name dispute was expected to materialise into the debut God Seed album. At certain points in time it was publicly stated by Gaahl and/or other parties that he had begun working on lyrics and vocal arrangements, but apparently on none of these occasions did Gaahl fulfil these, and his lack of enthusiasm would contribute to his decision to retire from metal in July 2009. In October 2008, studio times were allocated so Gaahl could begin work, prompting the cancellation of a tour. However, in December 2008 when interviewed by Faceculture, Gaahl implied that he had not yet worked on lyrics and vocal arrangements and intended to do so at some point after the completion of his band's European tour with Cradle of Filth. In early 2009, Gaahl and his partner Robin went on vacation in Spain for two months. While Gaahl was abroad, King claimed that he was using this time to work on lyrics and vocal arrangements, but after Gaahl returned from Spain it was stated by King that these had still yet to be done:

We have recorded everything in the studio and are just waiting for Gaahl to put on vocals on it. So we have only vocals and the final mix to go before it's all done. It's sometimes a nightmare to work with him in the studio because of the pride he puts into the smallest details. If he is not in the right mood or doesn't find the correct words we get nothing done. At times I've spent days in the studio counting seconds with nothing happening. It's the same way now, but I know in the end the result will be unique and powerful. We have to wait till Gaahl is done writing his lyrics to choose the title for the album. When the whole concept of this album is done lyrically we'll decide which title to use.

=== Infernus files lawsuit against Gaahl and King (September 2008 – March 2009) ===
On December 1, 2008, it was announced on Infernus' official Gorgoroth website that a trial date was scheduled in Oslo, Norway and would take place in the last week of January 2009.

The trial took place between January 28–30, 2009, and on March 10, 2009, Infernus announced the verdict had been reached:

"Oslo City District Court has today delivered a verdict on the main question in the Gorgoroth trademark case, which took place at the end of January 2009. The court has decided that King ov Hell's trademark registration # 243365 of the band name Gorgoroth is NOT valid and shall therefore be deleted. The court states that King ov Hell and Gaahl excluded themselves from the band Gorgoroth when they tried to fire Infernus in October 2007. The court further states that Infernus cannot be excluded from Gorgoroth, unless he himself decides to quit. Infernus is very pleased, but not surprised, by this verdict. The remaining issues concerning financial matters and such are yet to be decided upon."

The name was considered to have already been trademarked by use before Gaahl and King joined the band in 1998 and 1999 respectively. According to Infernus' lawyer Erik Rødsand, Gaahl and King are prohibited from choosing band names that are "confusingly alike to" Gorgoroth. This would also include their previously registered "The Force Gorgoroth". The domain name gorgoroth.org which had been under their control was redirected to the official website at www.gorgoroth.info until the lease eventually expired in 2010. Gaahl and King assumed the name God Seed after the verdict, although the lineup was to dissolve in July 2009 after having had performed at two festivals following Gaahl's decision to leave and retire from metal music.

=== Gorgoroth DA and other subsequent events (April–May 2009) ===
In early April 2009, Infernus revealed to the public that Gaahl and King had opened a small business called "Gorgoroth DA", apparently intended to be in connection with the Gorgoroth band name, and that the business was to be ordered to be shut down. On June 2, 2009, an article in the Norwegian financial newspaper Dagens Næringsliv revealed that the remaining issues in Infernus' lawsuit had been agreed upon by the two parties, and that a settlement had been made. The details of the settlement are confidential, but Infernus commented that he was content with the outcome. In the same article, King and Gaahl's lawyer, Lars Christian Fjeldstad, confirmed that the verdict concerning the trademark registration was final — meaning it cannot be appealed — and that a settlement had been made regarding the remaining issues of the lawsuit.

== Key events ==
The sequence of key events in the name dispute is as follows:

Date	Key event
13 September 2007	King with the assistance of Anders Odden filed a trademark application to Patentstyret for the name and logo of Gorgoroth.
21 October 2007	Infernus announced that the band had parted ways, with Infernus on one side and Gaahl and King on the other. The latter two however claimed that Infernus had been fired from Gorgoroth.
23 October 2007	Infernus' attorney Egil Horstad of Vogt & Wiig wrote a letter to legal representatives of Gaahl and King, warning them that the trademark application made by King and Anders Odden in September 2007 was in violation of select sections of the Patentstyret Trademark Act.
31 October 2007	Infernus released a press statement, where he revealed to the public King's trademark application from September 2007 as well as announced his next studio album Quantos Possunt ad Satanitatem Trahunt.
13 December 2007	Regain Records declared support for Infernus.
19 December 2007	Gaahl and King released a press statement announcing the approval of the latter's trademark application by the First Department of the Patent Office.
3–14 January 2008	King's trademark application was approved and enforced by the First Department of the Patent Office.
4 March 2008	Infernus announced that he had hired additional lawyer Kate I Lohren of Onsagers AS and made a non-negotiable offer to Gaahl and King with a three-day deadline.
11 March 2008	After Gaahl and King declined the offer from 4 March 2008, Infernus declared that his attorney would appeal the Norwegian Patent Office decision and "commence legal proceedings in order to have the matter handled by the courts."
15 March 2008	Infernus released a statement saying that he was "personally against racism in both thought and practice", in response to "vile rumours and speculation" circulating about him, as well as investigation on Gaahl's backgrounds by Norwegian anti-racist organisations.
July 2008	A temporary injunction by Malmø tingrett prohibited Regain Records from distributing True Norwegian Black Metal - Live in Grieghallen.
12 August 2008	Infernus issued a statement saying that the Gorgoroth trademark matter would not be decided until a verdict is made in a trial in Oslo, Norway which had yet to be announced, and that the matter of True Norwegian Black Metal - Live in Grieghallen would not be decided in another to-be-announced trial in Malmö, Sweden.
September 2008	Infernus filed his lawsuit against King ov Hell for the latter's trademark application in September 2007, on the grounds that Infernus had established his rights to the name and logo through use before King joined the band.
1 December 2008	An announcement was made stating the trial was scheduled to take place in Oslo, Norway, in the last week of January 2009.
28–30 January 2009	The trial took place in Oslo, Norway.
10 March 2009	Infernus announced that King ov Hell's trademark registration had been deemed invalid by the court in Oslo, and that the court had found that King ov Hell and Gaahl excluded themselves from the band Gorgoroth in October 2007.

== Witnesses who testified ==
The witnesses who were called to testify in the trial were:

=== For Infernus ===
- Infernus
- Tormentor
- Per Gyllenbäck - founder of Regain Records
- Torgrim Øyre - former Gorgoroth bassist T-Reaper, and organiser of Hole in the Sky festival
- Gro Narvestad - organiser of Inferno Festival
- Asbjørn Slettemark - Norwegian music journalist

=== For Gaahl / King ov Hell ===
- Gaahl
- King ov Hell
- Anders Odden - member of Cadaver, tour manager and live member of Satyricon, and head of office at GramArt, helped King with his trademark application
- Henk Mol - promoter from Dutch tour agency Vain Productions
