= True Norwegian Black Metal – Live in Grieghallen =

Live album by Gorgoroth
- Released: 23 June 2008
- Recorded: 2007–2008
- Genre: Black metal
- Length: 31:13
- Label: Regain

Gorgoroth chronology
Bergen 1996 (2007)	True Norwegian Black Metal – Live in Grieghallen (2008)	Quantos Possunt ad Satanitatem Trahunt (2009)

True Norwegian Black Metal – Live in Grieghallen is Gorgoroth's first full-length live album, released by Regain Records. It was recorded live in the studio at Grieghallen Lydstudio in Bergen and Threeman Recordings in Stockholm. The songs on the album represented the most commonly played songs in Gorgoroth's live set. The cover design by Magnus Wohlfart was radically different from the previous three full-length albums, being more reminiscent of the cover of the album Under the Sign of Hell (1997). Most of the album was recorded before the departure of vocalist Gaahl and bass guitarist King ov Hell, who had intended to use the band's name and assets. The bass guitar for this album (originally performed by King ov Hell) was later re-recorded by guitarist and band founder Infernus. Infernus dedicated the album to the late Jon Nödtveidt of Dissection.

== History and controversy ==
In July 2008, former band members Gaahl and King—then recognised as the trademark owners of Gorgoroth by select institutions until their trademark application was deemed to be invalid in March 2009—posted a MySpace bulletin announcing that "Swedish court authorities (Malmö tingrett) have sided with Gorgoroth copyright holders Gaahl and King" against Regain Records in halting distribution of the album. According to the bulletin, Regain Records had "illegally removed King's bass tracks and mixed the recordings without the knowledge of Gaahl and King". Gaahl and King claimed that Regain Records thus broke their contract with them. The bulletin also announced that they planned to take further action against Regain Records.

The following day, Regain Records released a response to the announcement, stating that the ceasing and sales of marketing was "only an interemistic decision made by the court to stop all actions in regards of the album" until "the case is settled and there's no verdict made on the matter yet." On 12 August 2008, Infernus issued a statement saying that this conflict would be decided in another trial in Malmö, Sweden; until then, a temporary injunction had stopped Regain Records from promoting and distributing the album.

In late June 2009, it was announced that Gorgoroth vocalist Pest had replaced Gaahl's vocals on the album, and that in preparation for a re-release, Infernus had consulted legal representatives regarding the album and was prepared to support Regain Records in the label's ongoing legal conflict with Gaahl and King in the event his support was needed.

== Track listing ==
All tracks are written by Infernus, unless noted otherwise.

No.	Title	Lyrics	Music	Album	Length
1.	"Bergtrollets Hevn"	Hat		Antichrist	3:16
2.	"Destroyer"		Tormentor	Destroyer	2:50
3.	"The Rite of Infernal Invocation"			Under the Sign of Hell	3:37
4.	"Forces of Satan Storms"		King ov Hell	Twilight of the Idols	4:34
5.	"Possessed (by Satan)"			Antichrist	5:07
6.	"Unchain My Heart!!!"			Incipit Satan	4:28
7.	"Profetens Åpenbaring"			Under the Sign of Hell	4:21
8.	"Revelation of Doom"			Under the Sign of Hell	3:00
Total length:					31:13

== Personnel ==
- Infernus – guitars, bass guitar (bass guitar re-recorded after live sessions at Threeman Recordings), mastering (Cutting Room, Stockholm)
- Gaahl – vocals
- Teloch – guitars (session)
- Garghuf – drums (session)
- Pytten – engineering (Grieghallen Studios, Bergen)
- Nico Elgstrand (Entombed) – engineering (Threeman Recordings, Stockholm), mixing
- Mats Lindfors – mastering
