= Black Mass Krakow 2004 =

Video by Gorgoroth
- Released: 9 June 2008
- Recorded: 2004 in Kraków, Poland
- Genre: Black metal
- Length: 54:58
- Label: Metal Mind
- Producer: Metal Mind

Black Mass Krakow 2004 is a live concert DVD by the Norwegian black metal band Gorgoroth. It was released by Metal Mind on 9 June 2008 in Europe and on 8 July 2008 in the US. The DVD is of the band's controversial 2004 concert that was filmed in a TV studio in Kraków, Poland. The DVD also includes live footage from the Full Force Festival Leipzig 2000, band biography, discography, photo gallery, desktop images and web links, and is compatible with Dolby Digital 5.1 Surround Sound.

== Controversy ==
The concert featured sheep heads on stakes, "crucified" nude models, Satanic symbols and eighty litres of sheep's blood. The band was criticised for violating Polish anti-blasphemy laws as well as Polish animal rights laws. A police investigation took place with allegations of a religious offence (which is prosecutable under Polish law) and cruelty to animals. Though these charges were considered, the band was not charged as it was ruled that they were unaware of the fact that what they were doing was illegal, although the concert organiser was eventually fined 10,000zł in 2007, as he knew about it and neither informed the band that it was against the law nor intervened. The whole controversy led to the band being dropped from the roster of the Nuclear Blast Tour and the footage of the concert being confiscated by the police.

== Track listing ==
Live video by Gorgoroth
No.	Title	Lyrics	Music	Original album	Length
1.	"Procreating Satan"	Gaahl	Kvitrafn	Twilight of the Idols
2.	"Forces of Satan Storms"	Infernus	King ov Hell	Twilight of the Idols
3.	"Possessed (by Satan)"	Infernus	Infernus	Antichrist
4.	"Bergtrollets Hevn"	Hat	Infernus	Antichrist
5.	"The Rite of Infernal Invocation"	Infernus	Infernus	Under the Sign of Hell
6.	"Profetens Åpenbaring"	Infernus	Infernus	Under the Sign of Hell
7.	"Of Ice and Movement..."	Gaahl	Kvitrafn	Twilight of the Idols
8.	"Ødeleggelse og Undergang" (Destruction and Doom)	Infernus	Infernus	Under the Sign of Hell
9.	"Blood Stains the Circle"	Infernus	Infernus	Under the Sign of Hell
10.	"Unchain My Heart!!!"	Infernus	Infernus	Incipit Satan
11.	"Revelation of Doom"	Infernus	Infernus	Under the Sign of Hell
12.	"Destroyer"	Infernus	Tormentor	Destroyer
13.	"Incipit Satan"	Gaahl	Tormentor	Incipit Satan
Total length:					54:58

== Personnel ==
- Gaahl – vocals
- Infernus – guitar
- King ov Hell – bass guitar
- Kvitrafn – drums
- Apollyon – guitar

== See also ==
- Gorgoroth discography
