= Demo 2002 =

Demo album by Orcustus
- Released: 2003
- Recorded: October–November, 2002
- Studios: Strangehagen Dungeons, Bergen
- Genre: Black metal
- Length: 16:00
- Label: Self-released
- Producers: Orcustus and Ivar Peersen

Orcustus chronology
Demo 2002 (2003)	World Dirtnap (2003)

Demo 2002 was the first release by the Norwegian black metal band Orcustus, founded by Taipan and with Infernus and Tormentor of Gorgoroth and Dirge Rep of Enslaved and Gehenna. It was limited to 1,000 copies on CD. This demo led to the band being signed to the US record label Southern Lord Records.

It was re-released by Misantrof ANTIrecords in 2007 as downloadable mp3s.

== Track listing ==
All music is composed by Taipan.

No.	Title	Lyrics	Length
1.	"Death Becomes You"	Taipan	4:15
2.	"World Dirtnap"	A.B.	5:41
3.	"Lucifuge Damnation"	Dirge Rep	6:04
Total length:			16:00

== Personnel ==
Orcustus

- Taipan – vocals, cover design
- Tormentor – guitars, cover design
- Infernus – bass guitar
- Dirge Rep – drums

Additional personnel

- Ivar Peersen – producer
- Alex 'Evil Tordivel' – mastering
- Jannicke Wiese-Hansen – logo design
