= Orcustus =

Norwegian black metal band

- Origin: Bergen, Norway
- Genre: Black metal
- Years active: 2002–2019
- Label: Southern Lord Records
- Past members: Taipan; Dirge Rep; Infernus; Tormentor; Teloch

Orcustus was a Norwegian black metal band formed in 2002 by Taipan, Infernus and Tormentor of Gorgoroth, and Dirge Rep of Enslaved and Gehenna. The band released their only studio album in 2009 and split-up in 2019. Taipan and Dirge Rep were the only continuous band members.

== History ==
Taipan, Dirge Rep, Infernus and Tormentor formed Orcustus in Bergen in early 2002. Dirge Rep suggested the band name, which means "the inner circle of Hell where Lucifer resides on his throne". Bård "Faust" Eithun, who had published the underground fanzine Orcustus in the early 1990s, approved their use of it.

In summer 2002, the band began rehearsing three tracks that became the Demo 2002. Taipan wrote those songs for his former band, Abattoir, between 1998 and 2000. They recorded the demo in autumn 2002 and released it early in 2003. The demo sold out and garnered praise from black metal musicians, such as Fenriz of Darkthrone. In 2003, the band signed with Southern Lord Recordings and released two tracks from their demo as the World Dirtnap EP.

In 2004, guitarist Teloch joined the band and contributed the track "Grin of Deceit" to their 2005 Wrathrash EP. The EP's title track originated from the Abattoir days. Teloch left Orcustus in 2006.

In spring 2007, the band began recording their debut album. They completed recording and mixing in June 2008. During this time, adversity led the members to end the project. In the last week of 2008, Dirge Rep and Taipan reformed Orcustus. They released the band's self-titled debut album in March 2009. In 2013, the band released the limited edition compilation album Anthology. Orcustus split-up in 2019.

== Members ==
- Taipan – vocals, guitars, bass (2002–2019)
- Dirge Rep – drums (2002–2019)
- Infernus – bass (2002–2008)
- Tormentor – guitars (2002–2008)
- Teloch – guitars (2004–2006)

== Discography ==
- Demo 2002 (demo) (2003)
- World Dirtnap (EP) (2003)
- Wrathrash (EP) (2005)
- Orcustus (2009)
- Anthology (compilation) (2013)
