= Les Litanies de Satan =

Poem by Charles Baudelaire

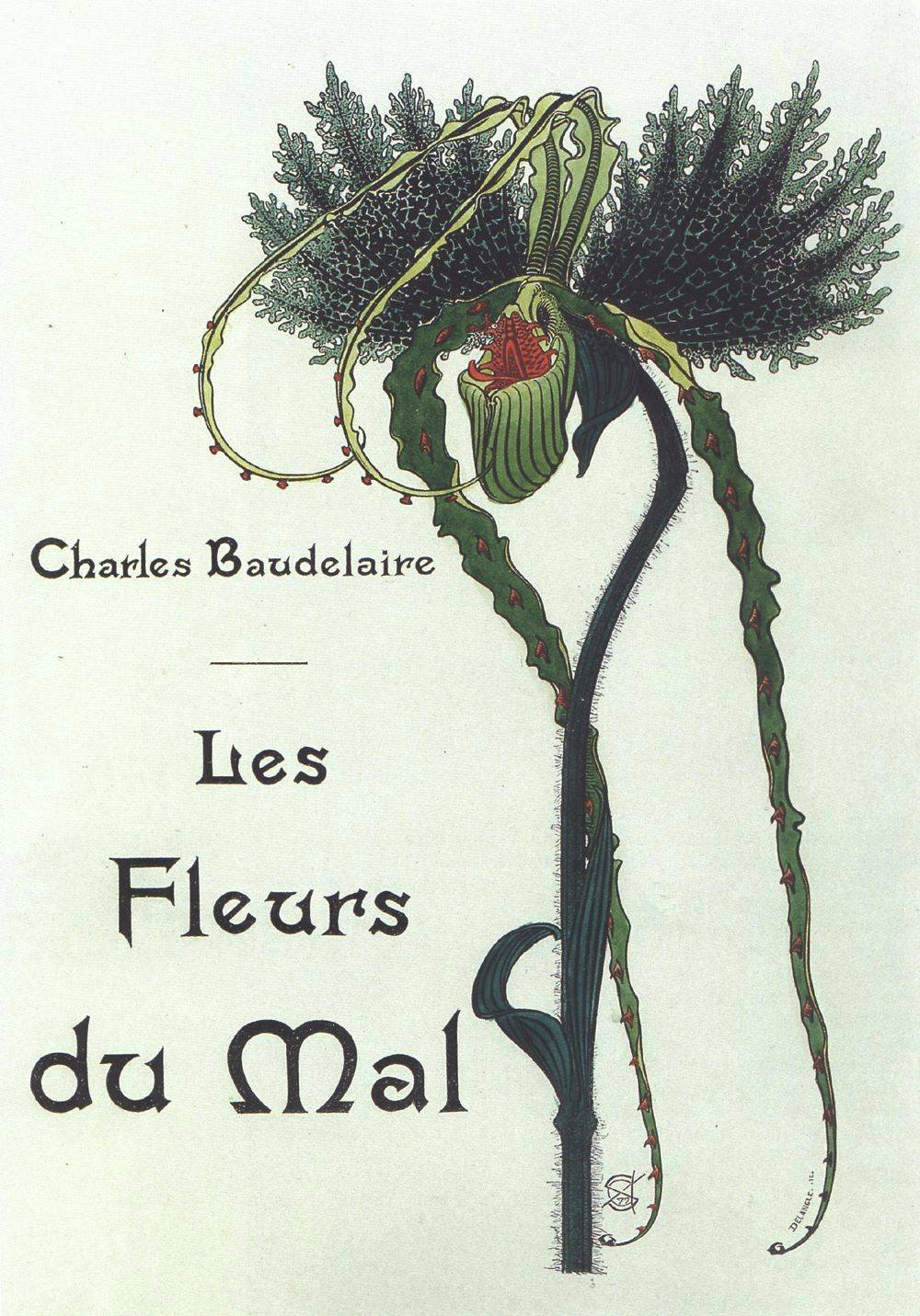

"Les Litanies de Satan" ("The Litanies of Satan") is a poem by Charles Baudelaire, published as part of Les Fleurs du mal. The date of composition is unknown, but there is no evidence that it was composed at a different time to the other poems of the volume.

The poem is a renunciation of religion, and Catholicism in particular. It includes a blasphemous inversion of the Kyrie Eleison and the Glory Be, parts of the Catholic Mass, or it substitutes Satan for Mary and liturgy directed towards her. Swinburne called it the key to Les Fleurs du mal. The poet empathises with Satan, who has also experienced injustice and can have pity for those who are outcasts. But for political reasons, Baudelaire had to preface the poem with a note explaining he had no personal allegiance with Satan. Even so, Les Fleurs du mal led to him and his publishers being fined for "insult to public decency".

The poem is an inspiration to Satanists to this day.

== Recordings ==
- American composer and electronic music pioneer, Ruth White, recorded an English translation for her 1969 release Flowers of Evil.
- In 1982, it was recorded in the original French by Diamanda Galás with electronic effects and released as a 12" single as The Litanies of Satan. It was later released as a CD.
- The Russian band Чёрный Обелиск recorded poem on their 1989 album.
- The Czech band Root (band) recorded the end of this poem on their 1991 album Hell Symphony.
- The Greek band Necromantia recorded an English translation for their début album Crossing the Fiery Path released in 1993.
- The Mexican thrash/death metal band Transmetal recorded a Spanish translation for their album Tristeza de Lucifer called "Las letanias de satan" ("Satan's litanies" in English).
- The Norwegian black metal act Gorgoroth performed "Litani til Satan", with Baudelaire's lyrics translated to Nynorsk, on their Incipit Satan album.
- The Polish band Sunrise Black recorded a Polish translation for their album Omnia pro Patria released in 2013.
- The Italian band Theatres des Vampires recorded a French version for their album Bloody Lunatic Asylum released in 2001.
- The Greek band Rotting Christ recorded a French version for their album Rituals released in 2016.
- Theater Oobleck recorded a version as part of their "Baudelaire In A Box" series.
- In 2018, Anakarsis a French group whose musical work is based around the book The Flowers of Evil recorded a rock version of The Litanies of Satan.
- The Lithuanian band Radamanth recorded poem on their in 2025 as single at first.
