= Morten Bergeton Iversen =

Norwegian guitarist

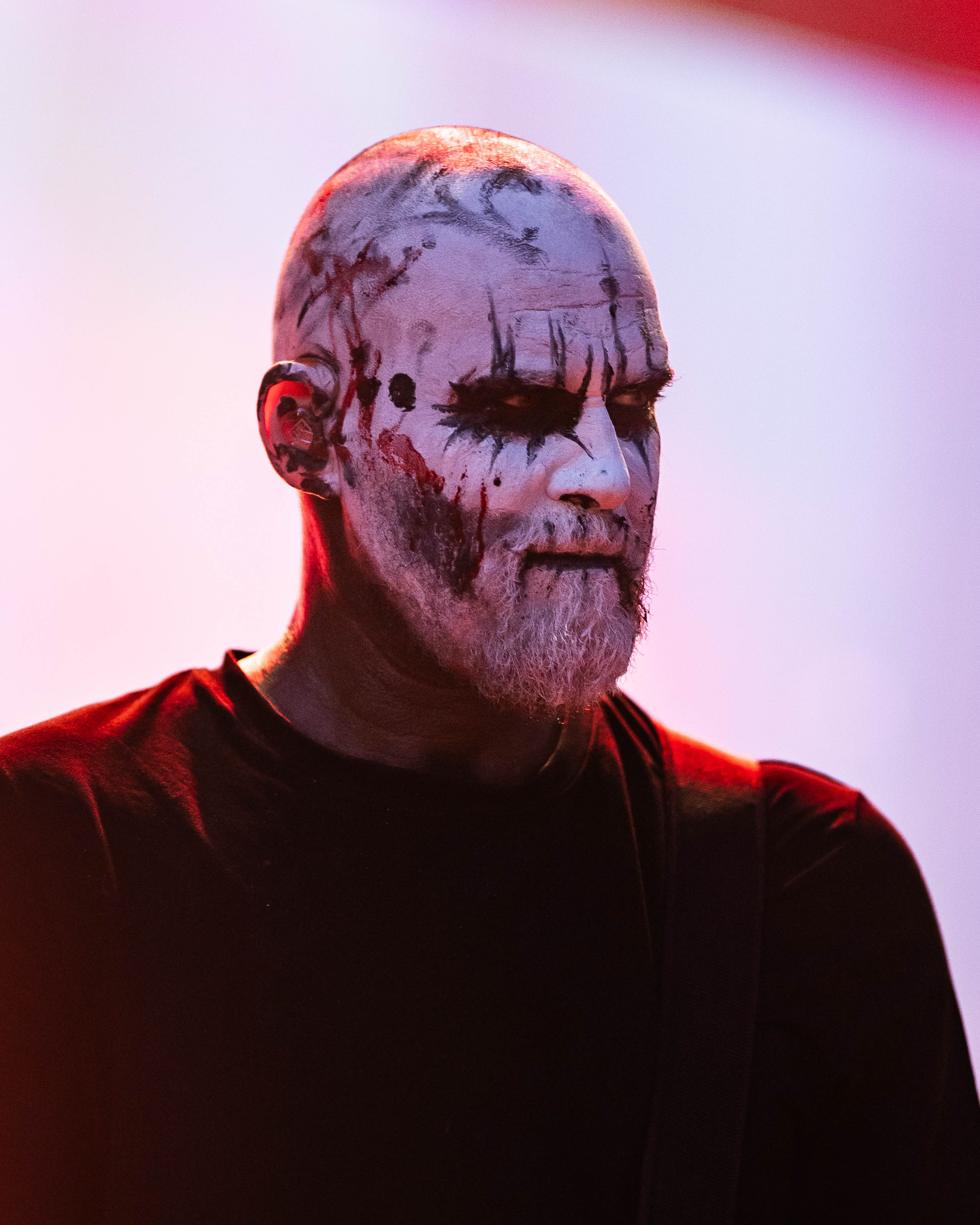
- Teloch with Mayhem at Midgardsblot 2025

Background information
- Also known as: Teloch
- Born: 19 November 1974 (age 51); Oslo, Norway
- Genres: Black metal; death metal; thrash metal; punk rock; electronic; synthwave
- Occupation: Musician
- Instruments: Guitar; bass; vocals; keyboards; synthesizer
- Years active: 1996–present
- Member of: Mayhem; Nidingr; Umoral; The Konsortium; Bergeton
- Formerly of: Orcustus

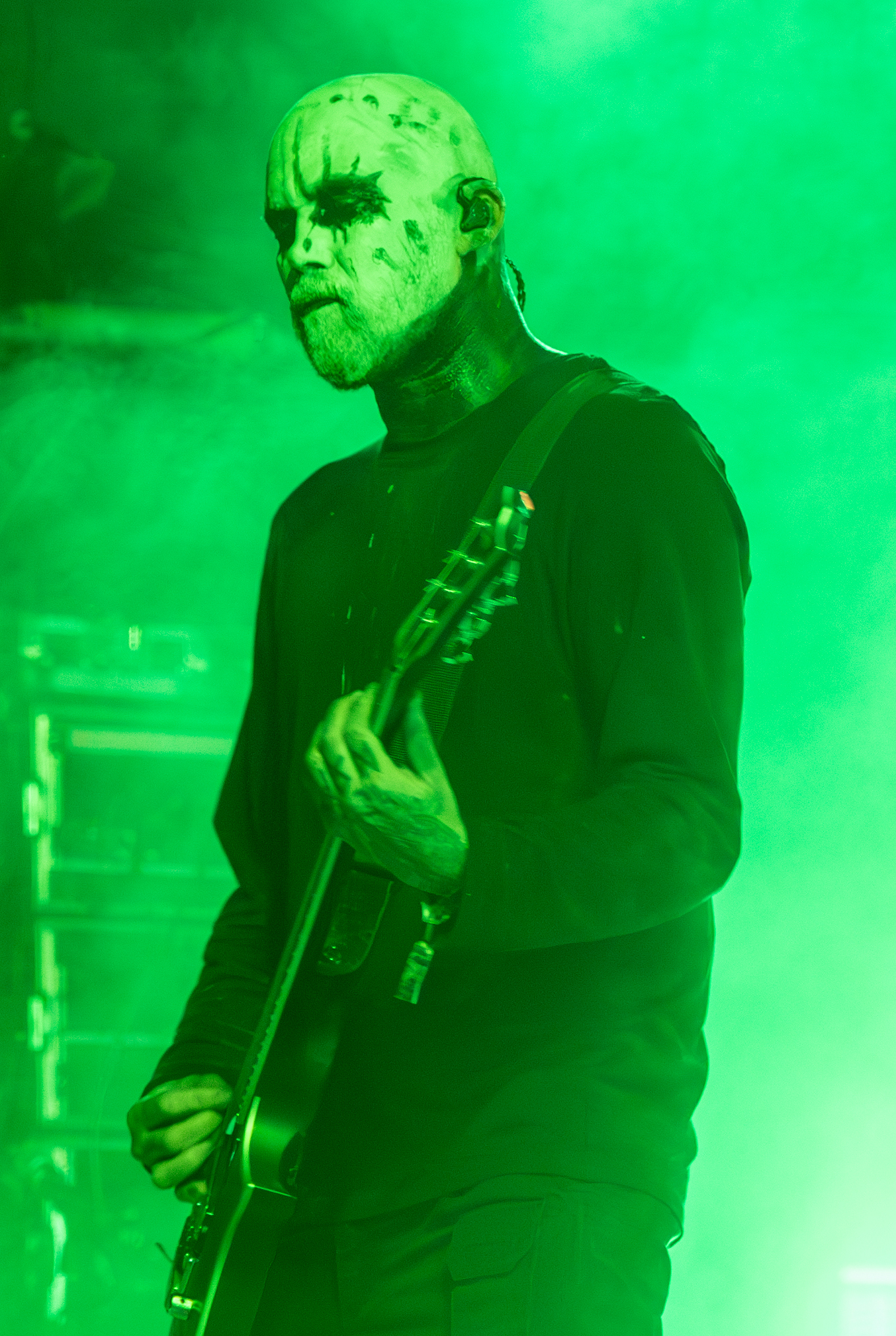
Teloch in 2024

Morten Bergeton Iversen (born 19 November 1974), better known by his stage name Teloch (/ˈtɛlɒk/ TELL-ok), is a Norwegian musician. He is a guitarist for black metal bands Mayhem and Nidingr, and fronts the eponymous electronic solo project Bergeton. Iversen is a former touring and session member of Gorgoroth, God Seed and 1349.

== Career ==
Iversen began his musical career in the early 1990s in punk band Dødsdømt, thrash/death metal band Legions and death metal band Morbidity. He founded black metal band Nidingr in 1996 and recorded their first demo that same year, with their second demo released in 1999.

In 2004, Iversen joined Gorgoroth, first as a guitar technician and then live member, and the band Orcustus with other members of Gorgoroth. He contributed guitars and vocals to Orcustus' 2005 EP Wrathrash, before leaving the project in 2006. Nidingr released their first studio album, Sorrow Infinite and Darkness, in 2005 and Iversen left Gorgoroth that same year. In 2006, he formed the black metal band Umoral and joined 1349, as a live guitarist, before departing the latter in 2007 and rejoining Gorgoroth. He appeared on Gorgoroth's live album True Norwegian Black Metal – Live in Grieghallen released in 2008 and toured with the band during that same year. It was stated during the Gorgoroth name dispute that Iversen would be joining Gaahl and King ov Hell in the studio for their next album. Following the conclusion of the dispute, he became a live member of their new band God Seed. The band dissolved in August 2009 after Gaahl announced his retirement from black metal. Iversen joined thrash/black metal band The Konsortium as a guitarist and Ov Hell as a session member in 2009.

In 2010, Nidingr released their second album, Wolf-Father, while The Konsortium released their self-titled debut album. Iversen joined Mayhem in 2011, replacing songwriter and guitarist Blasphemer. In 2012, God Seed released the live album Live at Wacken, which featured recordings of a 2008 show that had been performed under the Gorgoroth name. That same year, Nidingr released their third album, Greatest of Deceivers. Iversen released his first studio album with Mayhem, Esoteric Warfare, in 2014, having written almost the entirety of the album's music on his own. In 2015, he composed the music for a production of the Bertolt Brecht stage play Mother Courage and Her Children at the Norwegian Theatre. Nidingr released their fourth album, The High Heat Licks Against Heaven, in 2017. The Konsortium released their second studio album, Rogaland, the following year. Iversen released his second studio album with Mayhem, Daemon, in 2019 and was credited as a composer and lyricist on a majority of the album's songs. In 2020, he released his eponymous electronic/synthwave project Bergeton's first album, Miami Murder. In the following year, Iversen was inducted into the Rockheim Hall of Fame as a member of Mayhem.

== Discography ==
=== With Mayhem ===
==== Studio albums ====
- Esoteric Warfare (2014)
- Daemon (2019)
- Liturgy of Death (2026)

==== Live albums ====
- De Mysteriis Dom Sathanas Alive (2016)
- Daemonic Rites (2023)

==== Studio EPs ====
- Atavistic Black Disorder / Kommando

=== With Nidingr ===
- Sorrow Infinite and Darkness (2005)
- Wolf-Father (2010)
- Greatest of Deceivers (2012)
- The High Heat Licks Against Heaven (2017)

=== With The Konsortium ===
- The Konsortium (2011)
- Rogaland (2018)

=== With Orcustus ===
- Wrathrash (2005)

=== With Bergeton ===
- Miami Murder (2020)

=== With Umoral ===
- Der Sola Aldri Skinner (2021)

=== With Nunfuckritual ===
- In Bondage To The Serpent (2011)

=== Instrumental credits ===
Year	Artist	Title	Song(s)	Notes
2008	Gorgoroth	True Norwegian Black Metal – Live in Grieghallen		Guitar
2010	Ov Hell	The Underworld Regime	"Invoker", "Perpetual Night"	Guitar
2012	God Seed	Live at Wacken		Guitar
2012	Igorrr	Hallelujah	"Absolute Psalm", "Lullaby For A Fat Jellyfish"	
2015	Myrkur	M		Guitar, bass
