= Quantos Possunt ad Satanitatem Trahunt =

Studio album by Gorgoroth
- Released: 21 October 2009
- Recorded: March–June 2009
- Genre: Black metal
- Length: 34:47
- Label: Regain
- Producer: Infernus, Tomas Asklund

Gorgoroth chronology
True Norwegian Black Metal - Live in Grieghallen (2008)	Quantos Possunt ad Satanitatem Trahunt (2009)	Instinctus Bestialis (2015)

Quantos Possunt ad Satanitatem Trahunt (Latin for "They draw as many as they can toward Satanism") is the eighth studio album by Norwegian black metal band Gorgoroth. It was released on 21 October 2009 by Regain Records. This album marked the return of Pest on vocals, as well as the debut of Tomas Asklund (ex-Infernal/Dissection/Dark Funeral) on drums and Bøddel (the pseudonym of Frank Watkins of Obituary) on bass.

Infernus, the founding member and guitarist of Gorgoroth, began work on this album in October 2006, and was first reported to be writing it when he was released on parole from prison in March 2007. However, the latter stages of the songwriting and much of the recording process were overshadowed by the Gorgoroth name dispute which began in October 2007. Within two weeks of the beginning of the dispute, the album title was revealed to the public.

In the album's liner notes, Infernus thanks several people associated with the black metal community, including then-band members Asklund, Bøddel, Tormentor and Pest; former Gorgoroth members Goat, Hat, T-Reaper, Storm, Ares, Vrolok, Sjt. Erichsen, Apollyon, Skagg and Dirge Rep; Fenriz of Darkthrone, Attila Csihar of Mayhem, photographer Peter Beste, Tore Bratseth of Old Funeral, editor and journalist Metalion, Vrangsinn of Carpathian Forest, producer Pytten, directors Aaron Aites and Audrey Ewell, Hoest of Taake and Thurzur of Deathcult.

Infernus cited the ecclesiastical writer Adam of Bremen as the inspiration for the album's title, parodying his maxim Quantos Possunt ad Christianitatem Trahunt.

== History ==
Infernus began work on the album in October 2006, as he was about to serve a prison sentence for "gross negligent rape". He continued writing songs while he served his sentence, citing the "lack of outside distractions" as a factor. Shortly after he was granted parole in March 2007, the official Gorgoroth website (then situated at gorgoroth.org) announced that Infernus was "working on new material, both music and lyrics for an upcoming album, title yet undecided".

In October 2007, then-members Gaahl and King ov Hell attempted to remove Infernus from the band, igniting the Gorgoroth name dispute. On 31 October 2007, Infernus revealed the title to be Quantos Possunt ad Satanitatem Trahunt. Infernus said that "between 50 and 70% of the music" had "already been written (some of it even pre-recorded)" as well as "two or three lyrics". He stated that it would be released on Regain Records, which was reinforced by the decision of the record label in December 2007 to side with Infernus during the ongoing Gorgoroth name dispute. In December 2007, Bøddel and Asklund were revealed as new members of Gorgoroth on bass and drums respectively, and it was announced that former Gorgoroth guitarist Tormentor was assisting Infernus in arranging and producing the album.

== Recording ==
In April 2008, Infernus announced he was departing for Stockholm, Sweden, where the next few months were spent rehearsing the material for Quantos Possunt Ad Satanitatem Trahunt in Asklund's Monolith Studio. In August 2008, it was announced that a pre-recording for the album had been made with guitars, bass and drums. After having spent the previous few months rehearsing in Monolith Studio, Infernus said that he was working on arrangements with assistance from Tormentor.

On 4 December 2008, Gorgoroth's official website announced that former Gorgoroth vocalist Pest had returned, thus completing the band's lineup, both to record the new album and to play future live performances.

The Gorgoroth name dispute concluded in March 2009, when Oslo District Court recognised Infernus as the legitimate owner of the band name. Shortly thereafter, recording for Quantos Possunt Ad Satanitatem Trahunt began with Asklund recording drum tracks at Monolith. During this period, Infernus also recorded the guitars, "manually recording six basic guitars".

Although it was announced in August 2008 that the guitar and bass would be recorded in the Laboratório 6 studio in Pindamonhangaba, Brazil, with engineering help from Fabio Zperandio of Ophiolatry, once the trial over the Gorgoroth name dispute was scheduled for the end of January 2009, those plans were abandoned and instead the band decided to continue recording at Monolith. Since Infernus wrote all the music for the album, and extensive rehearsals and a preproduction recording had been completed before second guitarist Tormentor rejoined the band the previous year, it was also decided that it would be more convenient for Infernus to record all the guitars on the album.

Bøddel and Pest recorded bass and vocals respectively in June 2009, and the mixing process was finished by 26 June. On 5 July 2009, it was announced that Quantos Possunt Ad Satanitatem Trahunt was to be mastered at the Cutting Room in Stockholm later that month, and the album was scheduled to be released on 21 October in Europe and 11 November in the US. A tentative track listing was also revealed. Production was credited to Infernus and Asklund.

== Release and reception ==
Professional ratings
Review scores
Source	Rating
About.com	3.5/5 stars
Allmusic	4/5 stars
Kerrang!	4/5 stars
Metal Hammer	8/10 stars
PopMatters	8/10 stars
Rock Hard	8/10 stars
Terrorizer	8/10 stars

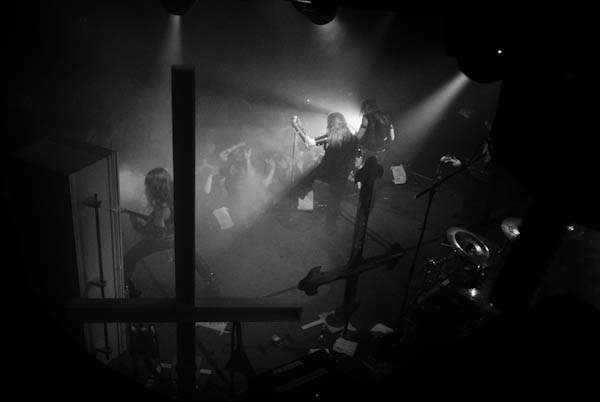
Gorgoroth, live at 2009's Hole in the Sky in support of Quantos.

The first press listening of Quantos Possunt Ad Satanitatem Trahunt was held in Berlin on 18 July 2009, with Infernus and Asklund present. In August, the finalized track listing for the album was released, as well as the cover artwork and a sample from the song "Prayer". It was also announced that the album would receive a limited-edition picture disc vinyl release on Infernus's own record label, Forces of Satan Records. A second press listening was held in Bergen, Norway, on 28 August 2009, in connection with the band's headlining performance at the Hole in the Sky festival on 29 August 2009. At the Hole in the Sky concert, the song "Aneuthanasia" was performed live, marking the first ever live performance of material from the album. A sample of the album version of this song was released on September 21. The song "Prayer" received its live debut at the band's concert at UKA 2009 in Trondheim, Norway, on October 19. This concert served as a "release party" for the new album.

The album was well received upon its release, earning high marks in magazines such as Metal Hammer and Rock Hard. The first pressing of the CD version of the album was packaged as a jewel case and included a limited-edition slipcover and also a patch of the cover artwork and band logo. The album was also released on regular 12" vinyl by Regain Records.

In April 2010, the band went on a European mini-tour to promote the album, with nine concerts in Belgium, the Netherlands, France, Italy and Germany. The set list for the tour contained three tracks from Quantos Possunt ad Satanitatem Trahunt: "Satan-Prometheus", "Aneuthanasia" and "Prayer".

== Track listing ==
All music is composed by Infernus.

No.	Title	Lyrics	Length
1.	"Aneuthanasia"	A. Behemot	2:19
2.	"Prayer"	Behemot	3:33
3.	"Rebirth"	V. Horg	6:34
4.	"Building a Man"	Horg	3:23
5.	"New Breed"	Horg	5:29
6.	"Cleansing Fire"	Horg	3:13
7.	"Human Sacrifice"	Horg	3:46
8.	"Satan-Prometheus"	Behemot	5:37
9.	"Introibo ad Alatare Satanas"	Infernus	0:53
Total length:			34:47

== Personnel ==
=== Gorgoroth ===
- Pest – vocals
- Infernus – guitar, production, arrangements, mastering
- Bøddel – bass
- Tomas Asklund – drums, production, mixing, mastering

=== Additional personnel ===
- Oskorei Grapix – artwork
- Christian Misje – artwork, photography
- Mats Lindfors – mastering
