= Pest (musician) =

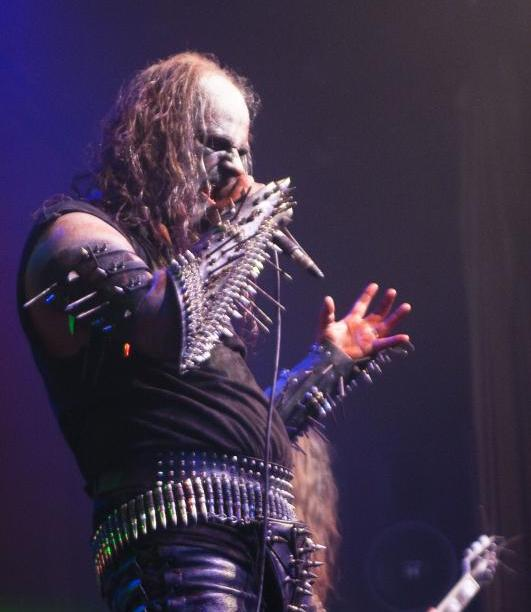
- Pest with Gorgoroth, São Paulo, Brazil, 2010

Background information
- Born: Thomas Kronenes; 16 September 1975 (age 51)
- Origin: Stord Municipality, Norway
- Genre: Black metal
- Occupations: Musician and teacher
- Instruments: Vocals, guitar and bass guitar
- Years active: 1989–present

Thomas Kronenes (born 16 September 1975), best known by the stage name Pest (Norwegian for "pestilence" or "plague"), is a Norwegian black metal musician, mainly known for his work in the band Gorgoroth. While a part of Gorgoroth he performed vocals, and also played guitar in the group for a very short time in 1996.

== Biography ==
Pest was one of the founding members of the Norwegian symphonic black metal band Obtained Enslavement, which was formed in Stord Municipality, Norway, in 1989. Obtained Enslavement released two demos in 1992 and 1993 before their first full-length album, Centuries of Sorrow, was released in 1994.

In 1995, Pest was approached by Infernus of Gorgoroth with an offer to join the band as their new vocalist, after the previous vocalist Hat had decided to leave the band. Pest performed his first concert with Gorgoroth in December 1995, supporting Cradle of Filth at the London Astoria, and provided the vocals for the song "Possessed (by Satan)" on the band's second album, Antichrist, released in 1996. Gorgoroth went on a European tour with Satyricon and Dissection in April 1996, followed by one-off gigs in Bergen, Norway and in Bischofswerda, Germany. Pest provided all the vocals on Gorgoroth's third full-length album, Under the Sign of Hell, which was recorded in spring 1996 and released in 1997. Obtained Enslavement, with Pest still on vocals, released their second full-length album, Witchcraft, the same year. Gorgoroth went on their first headlining European tour in fall 1997, after which Pest decided to leave the band to concentrate on his work in Obtained Enslavement. He did, however, contribute lyrics and vocals to several tracks on Gorgoroth's 1998 album, Destroyer.

Obtained Enslavement released two more albums: Soulblight in 1998 and The Shepherd and the Hounds of Hell in 2000. They performed their last ever concert in June 2000 at the first Hole in the Sky festival in Bergen, Norway. The band then split up since Pest would be moving to the US. There, he studied at Middle Tennessee State University and became a world history teacher at Coffee County Central High School in Manchester, Tennessee.

Since moving to the US, Pest has been involved in several American black metal bands, most notably as a vocalist on the forthcoming Blood Stained Dusk album, Black Faith Inquisition.

On 4 December 2008, it was announced that Pest had rejoined Gorgoroth. He was fired by Infernus on 21 August 2012, as stated on Gorgoroth's official internet page, after announcing that he would not be able to join the band's 2012 tour of Latin-America.

== Associated bands ==
- Gorgoroth - 1995–1997, 2008–2012
- Obtained Enslavement - 1989–2000
- Blood Stained Dusk - since 2005
- Octagon (US)

== Discography ==
=== Gorgoroth ===
- Antichrist (Tracks 1,4,6) (1996)
- The Last Tormentor (EP) (1996)
- Under the Sign of Hell (1997)
- Destroyer (Tracks 2,4,5,7) (1998)
- Bergen 1996 (EP) (2007)
- Quantos Possunt ad Satanitatem Trahunt (2009)
- Under the Sign of Hell 2011 (2011)

=== Obtained Enslavement ===
- Obtained Enslavement (demo) (1992)
- Out of the Crypts (demo) (1993)
- Centuries of Sorrow (1994)
- Witchcraft (1997)
- Soulblight (1998)
- The Shepherd and the Hounds of Hell (2000)

=== Blood Stained Dusk ===
- Black Faith Inquisition (2008)
