= Obtained Enslavement =

Norwegian black metal band

- Origin: Stord Municipality, Norway
- Genres: Black metal, symphonic black metal, death metal (early)
- Years active: 1989–2000
- Labels: Likstøy Records; Wounded Love Records; Napalm Records
- Past members: Pest; Heks; Døden; Torquemada; Tortur; T Ripper (Torgrim Øyre); Morrigan

Obtained Enslavement was a black metal band from Stord Municipality, Norway. They formed in 1989 and decided to split up in 2000 because Pest moved to the United States, and they did not succeed in finding a new singer. The most notable members, Pest and Torgrim Øyre, have also been members of the black metal band Gorgoroth.

The band's second studio album, Witchcraft, was given a ten out of ten rating by Chronicles of Chaos.

== Discography ==
=== Demos ===
- Obtained Enslavement (1992 demo)
- Out Of The Crypts (1994 demo)

=== LPs ===
- Centuries of Sorrow (1994 LP) CD re-issue by Vic Records 2011, plus the 2 demos
- Witchcraft (1997 LP)
- Soulblight (1998 LP)
- The Shepherd and the Hounds of Hell (2000 LP)
