= Witchcraft (Obtained Enslavement album) =

Studio album by Obtained Enslavement
- Released: July 1997
- Recorded: 1996
- Studio: Grieghallen Studio, Bergen
- Genre: Symphonic black metal
- Length: 51:29
- Label: Wounded Love Records
- Producer: Pytten, Obtained Enslavement

Obtained Enslavement chronology
Centuries of Sorrow (1994)	Witchcraft (1997)	Soulblight (1998)

Professional ratings
Review scores
Source	Rating
Chronicles of Chaos	10/10

Witchcraft is the second studio album by Norwegian black metal band Obtained Enslavement, succeeding their 1994 debut album, Centuries of Sorrow. The album was released in 1997 after being recorded in 1996 at Grieghallen Studio in Bergen. The album was co-produced by Pytten and Obtained Enslavement.

The album incorporates a greater degree of symphonic elements in contrast to the band's debut.

== Track listing ==
No.	Title	Length
1.	"Prelude Fenebre"	3:36
2.	"Veils of Wintersorrow"	6:08
3.	"From Times in Kingdoms..."	6:44
4.	"Witchcraft"	6:12
5.	"Warlock"	6:39
6.	"Torn Winds from a Past Star"	5:28
7.	"Carnal Lust"	6:08
8.	"The Seven Witches"	5:35
9.	"O'Nocturne"	4:59
Total length:		51:29

== Personnel ==
- Pest – vocals
- Døden – guitars
- Heks – guitars, keyboards
- Tortur – bass guitar
- Torquemada – drums, timpani
- Pytten – producer
