= Bergen 1996 =

Live album by Gorgoroth
- Released: November 2007
- Recorded: 23 May 1996
- Genre: Black metal
- Length: 6:44
- Label: Regain, Forces of Satan

Gorgoroth chronology
Ad Majorem Sathanas Gloriam (2006)	Bergen 1996 (2007)	True Norwegian Black Metal – Live in Grieghallen (2008)

Bergen 1996 is a live EP by Norwegian black metal band Gorgoroth. It was released in November 2007 on vinyl by Forces of Satan Records and on CD by Regain Records. The tracks were recorded live at Maxime in Bergen, Norway, on 23 May 1996. It was previously released in 1996 as The Last Tormentor on limited pressing of 666 copies.

== Track listing ==
No.	Title	Length
1.	"Revelation of Doom"	3:18
2.	"Ritual"	3:26

== Personnel ==
- Ares – bass guitar
- Grim – drums
- Infernus – guitars
- Pest – vocals
