= Orcustus (album) =

Studio album by Orcustus
- Released: March 3, 2009 (USA); March 9, 2009 (Europe)
- Recorded: 2007–2008
- Genre: Black metal
- Length: 41:47
- Label: Southern Lord (LORD102)
- Producer: Vrangsinn and Orcustus

Orcustus chronology
Wrathrash (2005)	Orcustus (2009)

Professional ratings
Review scores
Source	Rating
Allmusic	3.5/5 stars

Orcustus is the first full-length album by the Norwegian black metal band Orcustus. It was released by Southern Lord in March 2009.

== Track listing ==
1. "Coil" – 5:13
2. "Of Sophistry, Obsession and Paranoia" – 8:49
3. "Conversion" – 5:21
4. "Jesus Christ Patricide" – 7:45
5. "Death and Dissolution" – 4:42
6. "Ego Sum Chaos" – 6:03
7. "Asphyxiokenisis" – 3:50

== Credits ==
Orcustus

- Taipan (Christer Jensen) – vocals, guitar (2–4 & 6)
- Dirge Rep (Per Husebø) – drums, invocation (2), spoken word (7)

Bass guitarists

- Infernus – (1, 4–7)
- Tormentor – (2), guitar (1, 2, 5–7),
- Vrangsinn – (3)

Backing vocals

- Radek – (1, 4 & 5)

== Other notes ==
The music was written between 2003 and 2007 by Taipan and lyrics by Dirge Rep between 2003 and 2007.

It was recorded and produced at Misantrof Studios by Vrangsinn and Orcustus in 2007. Vocals were recorded at Slimecave Studios by Radek and Taipan in 2007 and 2008. The album was mixed at Conclave Studios by Bjørnar E. Nilsen and Taipan in 2008. Graphic art and layout are by Dirge Rep.
