= King ov Hell =

Norwegian musician

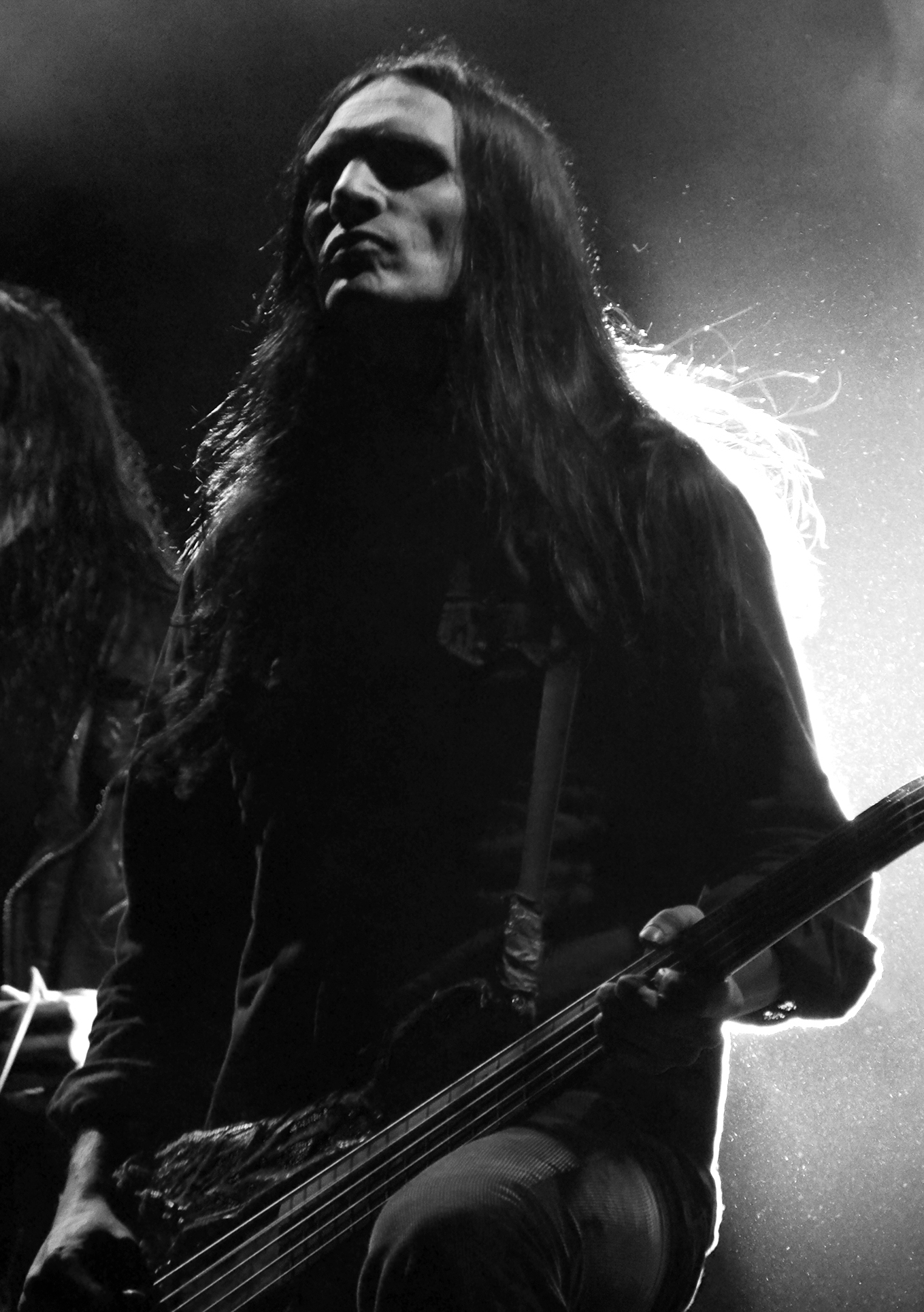
- Visnes performing live with God Seed in 2015

Background information
- Also known as: King, TC King
- Born: Tom Cato Visnes; 27 November 1974 (age 51)
- Origin: Bergen, Norway
- Genre: Black metal
- Instruments: Bass; drums; vocals; guitar
- Years active: 1999–present
- Formerly of: Gorgoroth; Audrey Horne; Sahg; I; Ov Hell; God Seed; Abbath; Jotunspor; Temple of the Black Moon

Tom Cato Visnes (born 27 November 1974), better known as King ov Hell or simply King, is a Norwegian musician. He is best known as the former bassist of black metal band Gorgoroth, and as a member of Audrey Horne, Sahg, I, Ov Hell, God Seed and Abbath.

== Biography ==
King joined the Bergen-based black metal band Gorgoroth as a bassist in 1999, shortly before the recording of their fifth album Incipit Satan. In 2002, he co-founded the rock band Audrey Horne. King wrote the majority of the music for the Gorgoroth sixth studio album, Twilight of the Idols, released in 2003. The following year King formed the doom metal band Sahg with Gorgoroth drummer Einar Selvik and Thomas Tofthagen of Audrey Horne.

In 2005, Audrey Horne released their debut album No Hay Banda and won the Norwegian Spellemann Award in the 'Metal' category. Sahg released their first studio album Sahg I in 2006. King further collaborated with Einar Selvik that same year in the black metal band Jotunspor and on their album Gleipnirs Smeder.

King composed all the music for Gorgoroth's 2006 album Ad Majorem Sathanas Gloriam. The album was nominated for a Spellemann Award in the 'Metal' category that same year. Later in 2006, King joined the Norwegian supergroup I as a bassist along with Abbath of Immortal, Arve Isdal of Enslaved and Audrey Horne, and former Immortal drummer Armagedda. The band released the album Between Two Worlds in 2006 and performed their only show at that year's Hole in The Sky Festival in Bergen. King temporarily quit Gorgoroth in June 2006, reportedly due to having difficulties with fronting some of the ideological aspects of the band's agenda, but later stated that the reason was dissatisfaction with Infernus' lack of contributions to the band. He rejoined the band in 2007 by the request of Gaahl and left Audrey Horne later that year to focus on Gorgoroth.

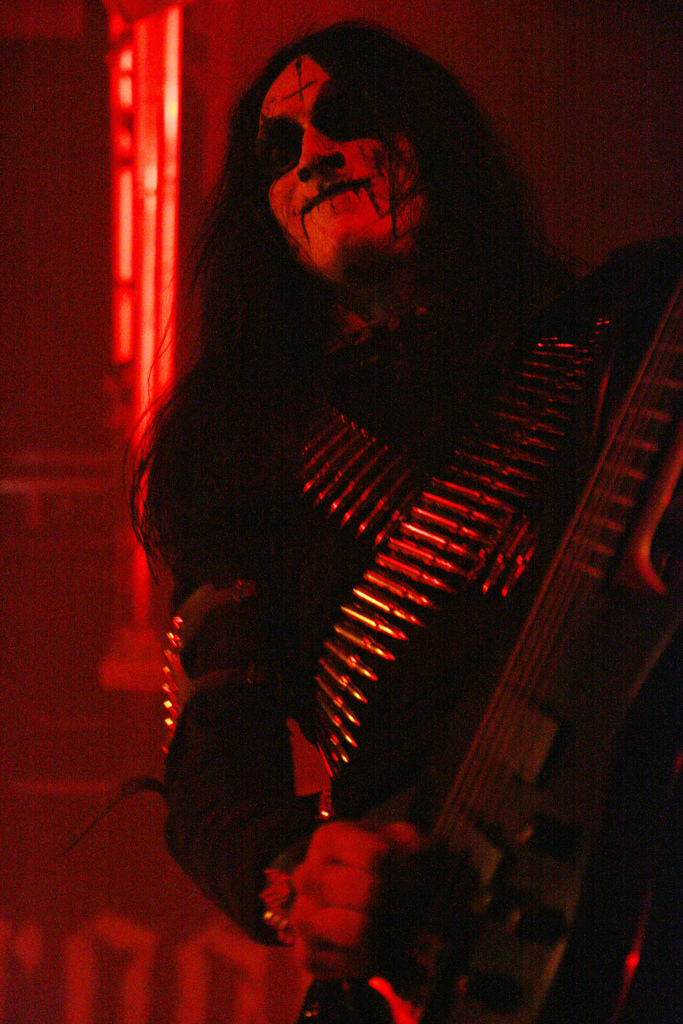
King ov Hell performing with Gorgoroth in 2007

In September 2007, King filed a trademark application to the Norwegian Industrial Property Office for the name and logo of Gorgoroth, and in the following month he and vocalist Gaahl attempted to fire founding member Infernus, igniting a dispute for the Gorgoroth name. The reasons given for the duo's actions were claims of Infernus having no interest in promoting Gorgoroth or participating creatively and the guitarist's abusive and disrespectful behaviour towards promoters, session members and other working partners, along with Gaahl and King's claim of having "creatively defined" the band through the past eight years. King also cited feeling averse to being associated with Infernus during and after the latter's trial and conviction for rape. In 2008, Gorgoroth released the video album Black Mass Krakow 2004, while Sahg released their second studio album Sahg II. Gaahl and King toured with Gorgoroth later that year alongside a new lineup consisting of Teloch, Arve Isdal and Nick Barker of Cradle of Filth.

Following a trial for the ownership of the Gorgoroth name in January 2009, the Oslo City District Court ruled in March that King's trademark application was not valid and that Infernus was the legitimate owner of the name, and that Gaahl and King had excluded themselves from the band by attempting to fire the guitarist. Following the conclusion of the dispute, King and Gaahl assumed the name God Seed. After Gaahl's decision to retire from metal music in July 2009, King dissolved God Seed and formed Ov Hell with Shagrath of Dimmu Borgir. The music he had written for God Seed's debut album was later used for Ov Hell's 2010 album The Underworld Regime. Gaahl and King re-formed God Seed in 2012 and released the album I Begin that same year. Following Abbath's departure from Immortal in 2015, King joined the frontman in his eponymous band. The band released their self-titled debut album in 2016. King left the band in 2018 over conflicting views on the lyrical concepts of their second album.

== Relationship with the metal scene and ideology ==
King has been part of several projects and collaborations with other members of the Norwegian black metal scene throughout his career. He is closely associated with Gaahl, who he collaborated with for many years as a member of Gorgoroth and God Seed. King collaborated with Einar Selvik of Wardruna in Gorgoroth, Sahg and Jotunspor. He worked with Abbath of Immortal in the supergroup I and the frontman's eponymous band. King has collaborated with Enslaved guitarist Arve Isdal in Audrey Horne and I, in addition to Gorgoroth, God Seed and Ov Hell where the guitarist served as a live and session member. Shagrath of Dimmu Borgir joined the Ov Hell lineup as vocalist.

King and Isdal were also a part of the supergroup Temple Of The Black Moon with Cradle of Filth vocalist Dani Filth, guitarist Rob Caggiano of Anthrax and Volbeat, keyboardist Gerlioz from Dimmu Borgir and drummer John Tempesta of The Cult and White Zombie. The band released a demo track and recorded an album titled Time to Prey that has remained unreleased. King has worked with Teloch of Mayhem as member of Gorgoroth, God Seed and Ov Hell. Frost of Satyricon contributed to Gorgoroth and Ov Hell albums with King as a session drummer. During the Gorgoroth name dispute, Anders Odden of Cadaver and Satyricon helped King file the trademark application and testified at the following trial for King and Gaahl. According to Gaahl, he and King are friends with the late Martin Eric Ain and Thomas Gabriel Fischer of Celtic Frost.

King attracted the attention of several detractors in the black metal scene during the Gorgoroth name dispute. Gorgoroth guitarist Tormentor departed the band in 2002 due to falling out with King and testified for Infernus at the trademark rights trial. Fenriz of Darkthrone, who also supported Infernus during the name dispute, has expressed disdain for King in several interviews and on his blog. Another supporter of Infernus, Swedish guitarist Blackmoon, has previously criticized King's satanical views.

In a 2010 interview with Norwegian newspaper Bergensavisen, King stated that he was not a Satanist despite having claimed to be so in earlier interviews. Instead, he claimed that "[w]e take seriously what is dark in nature and the human mind", and that "[t]he music, the images, the lyrics — all this is part of an artistic expression. Many find it provocative and scary, yes, but to us it is only parables."

== Discography ==
=== With Gorgoroth ===
==== Studio albums ====
- Incipit Satan (2000)
- Twilight of the Idols (2003)
- Ad Majorem Sathanas Gloriam (2006)

==== Live albums ====
- Black Mass Krakow 2004 (2008)

=== With Audrey Horne ===
==== Studio albums ====
- No Hay Banda (2005)

==== Studio EPs ====
- Confessions & Alcohol (2005)

=== With Sahg ===
- Sahg I (2006)
- Sahg II (2008)
- Sahg III (2010)

=== With I ===
- Between Two Worlds (2006)

=== With Jotunspor ===
- Gleipnirs smeder (2006)

=== With Ov Hell ===
- The Underworld Regime (2010)

=== With God Seed ===
==== Studio albums ====
- I Begin (2012)

==== Live albums ====
- Live at Wacken (2012)

=== With Abbath ===
- Abbath (2016)
