= Infernus =

Norwegian black metal musician

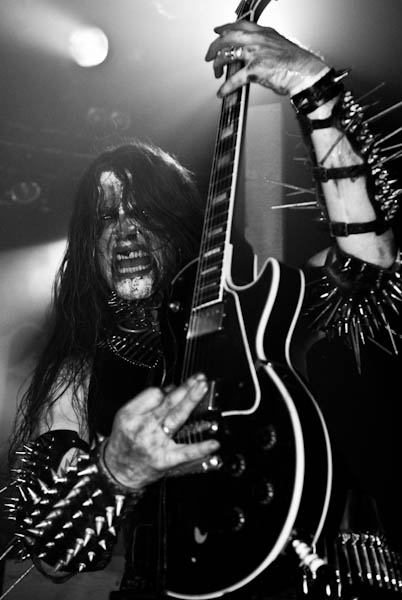
- Infernus in 2009

Background information
- Born: Roger Tiegs; 18 June 1972 (age 54); Umeå, Sweden
- Origin: Sunnfjord, Norway
- Genres: Black metal
- Occupation: Musician
- Instruments: Guitar; bass; drums; vocals
- Years active: 1993–present
- Member of: Gorgoroth
- Formerly of: Borknagar; Orcustus; Desekrator; Norwegian Evil

Roger Tiegs (born 18 June 1972), better known by his stage name Infernus, is a Norwegian black metal musician and Satanist. He is the sole founding member and chief ideologist of the black metal band Gorgoroth, formed in 1992, in addition to being the founder and head of Forces of Satan Records. While mainly a guitarist, Infernus has also participated as bassist, drummer and vocalist on several recordings released both by Gorgoroth and other bands.

== Biography ==
=== The formation of Gorgoroth ===
Infernus founded the black metal band Gorgoroth in Sunnfjord in 1992 after allegedly making "a pact with the Devil". The first Gorgoroth demo, A Sorcery Written in Blood, was released in 1993, and led the band to acquiring a record deal with French label Embassy Productions. The first full-length Gorgoroth album, Pentagram, was released in 1994. In the following years, the band experienced several line-up changes, with Infernus being the sole original member to continue in the band. Joining members of black metal bands such as Ulver, Immortal, Enslaved, and Molested, Infernus participated as bassist on Borknagar's self-titled debut album, released in 1996. After signing a deal with German label Malicious Records, Gorgoroth released the albums Antichrist in 1996 and Under the Sign of Hell in 1997, with Infernus writing all the music and the majority of the lyrics, in addition to performing both guitar and bass duties on the albums.

=== Gorgoroth tenure with Nuclear Blast ===
After the release of Under the Sign of Hell and a European headlining tour in 1997, Gorgoroth was signed by the major German metal label Nuclear Blast. In 1998, Infernus and Gorgoroth-guitarist Tormentor, who had joined the band in 1996, released an album as black metal side project called Desekrator, which also included members of Enslaved and Old Funeral. Infernus wrote the majority of the first two Gorgoroth albums released on Nuclear Blast, Destroyer (1998), and Incipit Satan (2000), while Tormentor, wrote the albums' title tracks. After performing live with Gorgoroth on several festivals and tours both in Europe and South America, Infernus became one of the founding members of the black metal band Orcustus in 2002, a band consisting of members and ex-members of Gorgoroth, Gehenna, and Enslaved. Twilight of the Idols - In Conspiracy with Satan, Gorgoroth's third release on Nuclear Blast, was released in 2003.

=== Rape conviction ===
In 2003, Infernus was accused of repeatedly raping a woman for hours with a friend at an after-party in his apartment. He was initially sentenced to three years in prison in 2005, but appealed the sentence and was acquitted of rape but convicted of gross negligent rape and sentenced to one year in prison. He served four months in prison in the winter of 2006 and 2007 before being released on parole.

=== Gorgoroth controversy in Kraków and transfer to Regain Records ===
On 1 February 2004, Infernus and Gorgoroth performed a live show in Kraków, meant to be released on a video album by Metal Mind Productions. Due to the satanic nature of the live show, which featured sheep heads on stakes, "crucified" nude models, satanic symbols and 80 litres (21 US gal; 17 1/2 imp gal) of sheep's blood, the band and video producers were accused of breaking the Polish blasphemy laws. The tapes from the concert were confiscated by the Polish police for 4 years, but the concert was finally released on DVD in the summer of 2008 as Black Mass Krakow 2004. In 2005, Infernus and Tormentor, who had quit Gorgoroth in 2002, released a cover version of Von's "Satanic Blood" under the name Norwegian Evil. After leaving Nuclear Blast in 2004, Infernus and Gorgoroth signed on Swedish record label Regain Records, which released the next Gorgoroth album, Ad Majorem Sathanas Gloriam, in 2006.

=== Forces of Satan Records ===
On 6 June 2006 Infernus started his own record label, Forces of Satan Records, dedicated to only releasing albums by bands with a "clear-cut Satanic profile". The label's first release was the Gorgoroth live EP Bergen 1996, followed by albums by the Italian black metal band Black Flame, the Brazilian death metal band Ophiolatry, and the Serbian black metal band Triumfall.

=== Gorgoroth name dispute ===
In October 2007, singer Gaahl and bassist King attempted to fire Infernus from Gorgoroth, marking the start of the Gorgoroth name dispute. In March 2009, Infernus announced that he had won the rights to the Gorgoroth name following a trial with Gaahl and King. The court stated that King and Gaahl had excluded themselves from the band when they had attempted to fire the guitarist. The court further stated that Infernus cannot be excluded from Gorgoroth unless he himself should decide to quit. With the departure of Gaahl and King, Infernus recruited drummer Tomas Asklund of Dissection and bassist Bøddel of Obituary, as well as former-Gorgoroth vocalist Pest and guitarist Tormentor for the recording of their next album.

=== Quantos Possunt ad Satanitatem Trahunt and Instinctus Bestialis ===
Gorgoroth released the album Quantos Possunt ad Satanitatem Trahunt in 2009. Infernus thanked both current and former members of the band, as well as several members of the black metal scene and community in the album's liner notes. In 2015, Gorgoroth released their ninth studio album, Instinctus Bestialis.

=== Assault and hospitalization ===
In early August 2023, Infernus was assaulted and hospitalized following Gorgoroth's appearance at the Beyond the Gates Festival in Bergen. The injuries led to an absence from the band's following shows and the cancellation of a planned tour of Mexico in October. Infernus returned to live performances in late November.

== Beliefs ==
Infernus is a theistic Satanist and, as the founding member of Gorgoroth, has built the band on his philosophy and religion, proclaiming himself as 'Satan's Minister on Earth.' When asked in March 2009 about what he specifically practiced, he described it as a Gnostic form of Satanism. In an interview conducted in March 2009 following the conclusion of the Gorgoroth name dispute with former colleagues Gaahl and King of Hell, he explicitly reaffirmed that he was 'the ideological backbone of Gorgoroth.' He has expressed opposition to the Church of Satan based on commercial frivolity, and when asked about this on a couple of occasions in 2009, he also said that he disagreed with their basic values:

'Basically, because they reject a theist view upon being. I do not regard man as the center of the universe. These are my views and they are not the views of any humanist or so-called atheist.'

== Gallery ==
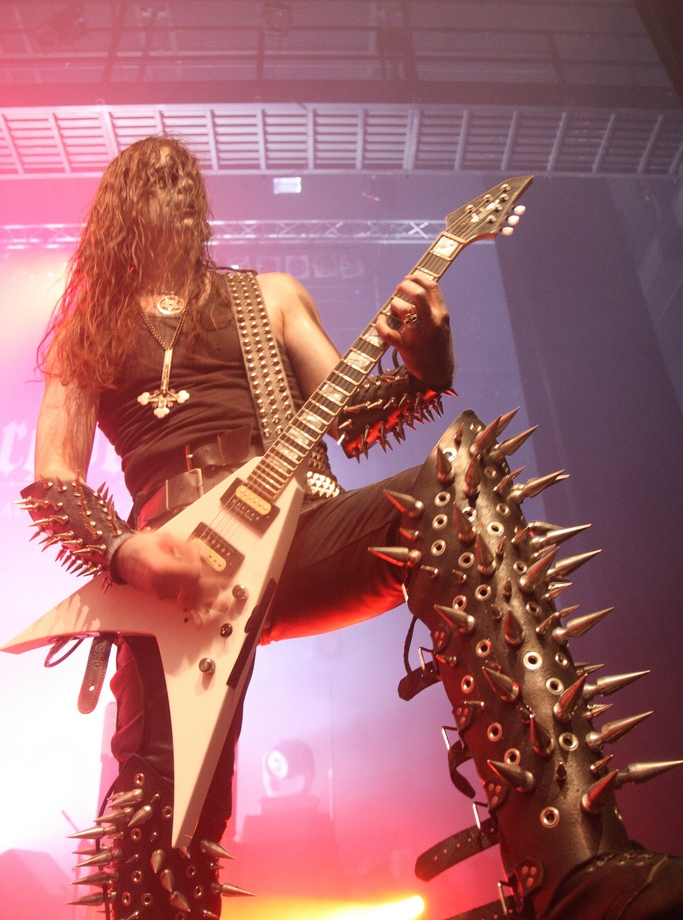
Infernus in 2010

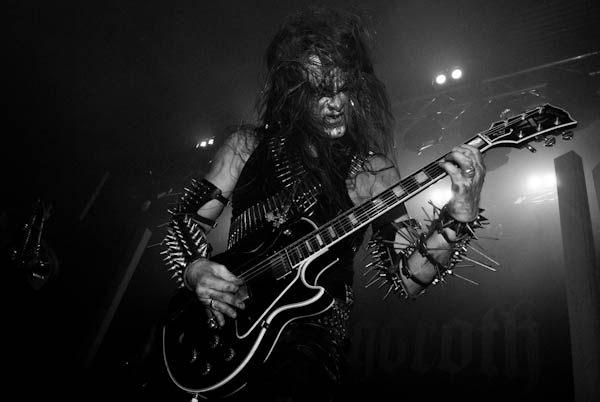
Infernus in 2009

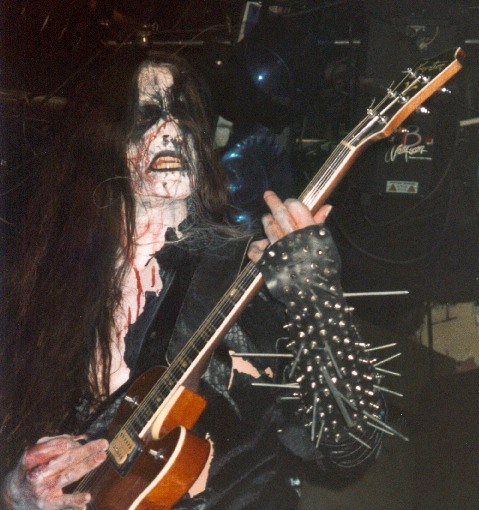
Infernus in 2001

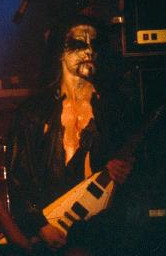
Infernus in 2000

== Discography ==
| Year | Title | Band |
|---|---|---|
| 1993 | A Sorcery Written in Blood | Gorgoroth |
| 1994 | Promo '94 | Gorgoroth |
| 1994 | Pentagram | Gorgoroth |
| 1996 | Antichrist | Gorgoroth |
| 1996 | The Last Tormentor | Gorgoroth |
| 1996 | Borknagar | Borknagar |
| 1997 | Under the Sign of Hell | Gorgoroth |
| 1997 | Desekrator Demo | Desekrator |
| 1998 | Metal for Demons | Desekrator |
| 1998 | Destroyer | Gorgoroth |
| 1999 | Hot in the City/Overdose/Take Us to the Pub | Desekrator |
| 2000 | Incipit Satan | Gorgoroth |
| 2002 | Demo 2002 | Orcustus |
| 2003 | World Dirtnap | Orcustus |
| 2003 | Twilight of the Idols | Gorgoroth |
| 2005 | Wrathrash | Orcustus |
| 2005 | A Norwegian Hail to Von | Norwegian Evil |
| 2006 | Ad Majorem Sathanas Gloriam | Gorgoroth |
| 2007 | Bergen 1996 | Gorgoroth |
| 2008 | Black Mass Krakow 2004 | Gorgoroth |
| 2008 | True Norwegian Black Metal - Live in Grieghallen | Gorgoroth |
| 2009 | Orcustus | Orcustus |
| 2009 | Quantos Possunt ad Satanitatem Trahunt | Gorgoroth |
| 2011 | Under the Sign of Hell 2011 | Gorgoroth |
| 2015 | Instinctus Bestialis | Gorgoroth |
