= A Sorcery Written in Blood =

Demo album by Gorgoroth
- Released: 28 April 1993
- Recorded: 4 April 1993
- Genre: Black metal
- Length: 8:56
- Label: Self-released
- Producer: Gorgoroth

Gorgoroth chronology
A Sorcery Written in Blood (1993)	Promo '94 (1994)

A Sorcery Written in Blood was the first demo released by Norwegian black metal band Gorgoroth. The title of the demo was taken from the lyrics of the song "The Return of Darkness and Evil" by the band Bathory. The demo was released in 1993 as a limited edition hand-numbered cassette. A 7" vinyl bootleg also existed; however, there were no official reissues. Due to the Satanic imagery used on the demo cover, the newspaper Firda in Førde in Sogn og Fjordane, Norway, ran a front-page story on the demo and Gorgoroth on 7 January 1994. The demo led to the band landing a record deal with French record label Embassy Productions. The track "Sexual Bloodgargling" was an early version of the song "Ritual", re-recorded for Gorgoroth's first album Pentagram.

== Track listing ==
No.	Title	Length
1.	"Gathered at Blåkulla"	1:21
2.	"Sexual Bloodgargling"	3:54
3.	"(Under) The Pagan Megalith"	3:41
Total length:		8:56

== Gorgoroth ==
- Hat – vocals
- Infernus – guitar
- Kjettar – bass
- Goat Pervertor – drums
