= Under the Sign of Hell =

Studio album by Gorgoroth
- Released: 20 October 1997
- Recorded: 1996
- Studio: Grieghallen Studio
- Genre: Black metal
- Length: 32:53
- Label: Malicious
- Producer: Infernus, Eirik Hundvin

Gorgoroth chronology
Antichrist (1996)	Under the Sign of Hell (1997)	Destroyer (1998)

Alternative cover
- Re-recorded version album cover

Gorgoroth chronology
Quantos Possunt ad Satanitatem Trahunt (2009)	Under the Sign of Hell 2011 (2011)	Instinctus Bestialis (2015)

Professional ratings
Review scores
Source	Rating
About.com	4.5/5 stars
AllMusic	4/5 stars
Cosmos Gaming	favourable

Under the Sign of Hell is the third studio album by Norwegian black metal band Gorgoroth. Recorded in 1996 and released in 1997, it was the first album to feature Ares on bass (on one track) and the only one to feature Grim on drums.

== Release ==
Under the Sign of Hell was released on 20 October 1997 on Malicious Records. It was re-released in 1999 on Century Black, and again in 2005 on Season of Mist. Agonia Records released the album on LP in 2005, limited to 1000 copies, and Back on Black Records reissued the LP again in 2006. A remastered version was released in 2007 by Regain Records.

Gorgoroth re-recorded the album as Under the Sign of Hell 2011, released in November 2011 by Regain Records. This re-recorded version was the last album with vocalist Pest.

== Track listing ==
All tracks are written by Infernus.

No.	Title	Length
1.	"Revelation of Doom"	3:15
2.	"Krig" ("War")	2:43
3.	"Funeral Procession"	3:01
4.	"Profetens åpenbaring" ("Prophet's Revelation")	5:20
5.	"Postludium"	1:34
6.	"Ødeleggelse og undergang" ("Destruction and Doom")	4:28
7.	"Blood Stains the Circle"	2:42
8.	"The Rite of Infernal Invocation"	6:49
9.	"The Devil Is Calling"	3:01
Total length:		32:53

2011 re-recording
No.	Title	Length
1.	"Revelation of Doom"	3:00
2.	"Krig"	2:35
3.	"Funeral Procession"	3:02
4.	"Profetens åpenbaring"	4:26
5.	"Ødeleggelse og undergang"	4:15
6.	"Blood Stains the Circle"	2:41
7.	"The Rite of Infernal Invocation"	3:16
8.	"The Devil Is Calling"	3:01
Total length:		26:12

== Personnel ==
=== Gorgoroth ===
- Pest – vocals
- Infernus – guitar; bass on all tracks except "Revelation of Doom" (original release)
- Grim – drums

=== Additional Personnel ===
- Ares – bass on "Revelation of Doom" (original release)
- Pytten – production
- Tomas Asklund – drums (Under the Sign of Hell 2011)
