= Pentagram (Gorgoroth album) =

1994 studio album by Gorgoroth

Studio album by Gorgoroth
- Released: 12 October 1994
- Recorded: Early 1994 at Grieghallen Studio
- Genre: Black metal
- Length: 29:18
- Label: Embassy Productions
- Producer: Pytten, Gorgoroth

Gorgoroth chronology
Promo '94 (1994)	Pentagram (1994)	Antichrist (1996)

Professional ratings
Review scores
Source	Rating
About.com	4/5 stars
AllMusic	3.5/5 stars

Pentagram is the debut studio album by Norwegian black metal band Gorgoroth, released in September 1994 by Embassy Productions. It followed the band's two demo cassettes, A Sorcery Written in Blood and Promo '94. It was the only album to feature Samoth on bass and Goat Pervertor on drums.

== Reissues ==
Pentagram was reissued eight times, four of those on CD: in 1996 by Malicious Records, in 1999 by Century Black in America, in 2005 as a remastered version on Season of Mist and in 2007 on Regain Records. It was reissued four times on 12" vinyl: by Malicious Records in 1996 (limited to 500 copies), by Agonia Records in 2005 (limited to 1,000 copies), in 2006 by Back on Black Records, and in 2016 by Soulseller Records.

== Track listing ==
No.	Title	Lyrics	Music	Length
1.	"Begravelsesnatt" ("Burial Night")	Hat	Goat Pervertor	2:33
2.	"Crushing the Scepter (Regaining a Lost Dominion)"	Infernus	Infernus	3:22
3.	"Ritual"	Hat	Infernus	3:51
4.	"Drømmer öm død" ("Dreaming of Death")	Hat	Goat Pervertor	3:44
5.	"Katharinas bortgang" ("Katharina's Passing")	Infernus	Goat Pervertor	4:03
6.	"Huldrelokk"		Infernus	1:52
7.	"(Under) The Pagan Megalith"	Goat Pervertor	Goat Pervertor	3:53
8.	"Maaneskyggens slave" ("The Moon-Shadow's Slave")	Infernus	Infernus	5:53
Total length:				29:11

== Personnel ==
- Hat – vocals
- Infernus – guitar

Additional personnel

- Samoth – bass
- Goat Pervertor – drums

== Promo '94 ==
Promo '94

Demo album by Gorgoroth
- Released: April 1994
- Genre: Black metal
- Length: 9:44
- Label: Self-released

Gorgoroth chronology
A Sorcery Written in Blood (1993)	Promo '94 (1994)	Pentagram (1994)

Promo '94 is the second demo by Gorgoroth. It was independently released in 1994 on cassette, and featured raw mixes of two tracks from Pentagram.

=== Track listing ===
No.	Title	Length
1.	"Katharinas bortgang"	3:57
2.	"Måneskyggens slave"	5:47
Total length:		9:44

=== Personnel ===
- Hat – vocals
- Infernus – guitar

Additional personnel

- Samoth – bass
- Goat Pervertor – drums
