= Ad Majorem Sathanas Gloriam =

Studio album by Gorgoroth
- Released: 19 June 2006
- Recorded: January–May 2005, March–April 2006
- Genre: Black metal
- Length: 31:39
- Label: Regain, Candlelight
- Producer: Gorgoroth

Gorgoroth chronology
Twilight of the Idols (2003)	Ad Majorem Sathanas Gloriam (2006)	Bergen 1996 (2007)

Professional ratings
Review scores
Source	Rating
About.com	4.5/5 stars
Allmusic	4/5 stars

Ad Majorem Sathanas Gloriam is the seventh studio album by Norwegian black metal band Gorgoroth. It was released in Europe on 19 June 2006 by Regain Records and in the US on 25 July 2006 by Candlelight Records. This was the only Gorgoroth album on which all of the lyrics and music were written by Gaahl and King ov Hell, and was the last to feature both members. It also marked the return of drummer Frost and was the last Gorgoroth album that he appeared on. It was nominated for Norway's 2006 Spellemann award in the "Metal" category. It is the first Gorgoroth album with no Norwegian lyrics.

In November 2007, Ad Majorem Sathanas Gloriam was reissued with a slightly different cover and a DVD containing the "Carving a Giant" music video and another video documenting how the album was recorded.

== Title and artwork ==
The album title, a Latin term meaning "for the greater glory of Satan", was conceived by Infernus inspired by his reading an article about the Counter-Reformation, the Society of Jesus and Ignatius de Loyola. It is technically incorrectly translated; the accurate translation of Latin for "The Greater Glory of Satan" would be "Ad Majorem Sathanae Gloriam".

The cover artwork was taken from the 1850 painting Dante and Virgil by William-Adolphe Bouguereau.

== Track listing ==
All lyrics are written by Gaahl; all music is composed by King ov Hell.

No.	Title	Length
1.	"Wound upon Wound"	3:30
2.	"Carving a Giant"	4:10
3.	"God Seed (Twilight of the Idols)"	4:14
4.	"Sign of an Open Eye"	4:04
5.	"White Seed"	4:36
6.	"Exit"	3:30
7.	"Untamed Forces"	2:37
8.	"Prosperity and Beauty"	4:54
Total length:		31:39

== Personnel ==
=== Gorgoroth ===
- Gorgoroth – mixing in Bergen
  - Gaahl – vocals
  - Infernus – guitar; mastering
  - King ov Hell – bass
  - Frost – session drums

=== Additional personnel ===
- Herbrand Larsen – vocals and mixing at Earshot Studio, Bergen; March 2006
- Thomas Eberger – mastering
- Geir Luedy – drums at Lydriket Studio, Bergen; January 2005
- Svein Solberg – guitar & bass at Steel Production Studio, Spydeberg; May 2005
