= Instinctus Bestialis =

Studio album by Gorgoroth
- Released: 8 June 2015
- Recorded: September–December 2013
- Genre: Black metal
- Length: 31:20
- Label: Soulseller Records
- Producer: Infernus, Asklund

Gorgoroth chronology
Quantos Possunt ad Satanitatem Trahunt (2009)	Instinctus Bestialis (2015)

Professional ratings
Review scores
Source	Rating
Terra Relicta	9/10 stars
Metal Maniac	10/10 stars
Metal Injection	7/10 stars
Revolver Magazine	3.5/5 stars
Sputnikmusic	2.5/5 stars
Angry Metal Guy	3.5/5 stars
Metal.de	7/10 stars
Against Magazine	7/10 stars
Time for Metal	9/10 stars

Instinctus Bestialis is the ninth full-length studio album by Norwegian black metal band Gorgoroth. It was released on 8 June 2015 by Soulseller Records. It was also released digitally, as well as on digipak CD in a limited first pressing, limited black vinyl LP and limited picture vinyl LP. It is the first album to feature vocalist Atterigner and the last to feature bassist Bøddel, who died from cancer four months after the album's release. The album cover is taken from a painting called Christ in Limbo.

== Track listing ==
All lyrics are written by V. Horg, except track 1 and 5 by A. Behemot; all music is composed by Infernus.

No.	Title	Length
1.	"Radix Malorum"	3:14
2.	"Dionysian Rite"	4:05
3.	"Ad Omnipotens Aeterne Diabolus"	5:45
4.	"Come Night"	2:41
5.	"Burn in His Light"	4:02
6.	"Rage"	4:03
7.	"Kala Brahman"	5:23
8.	"Awakening"	2:07

== Personnel ==
=== Gorgoroth ===
- Atterigner – vocals
- Infernus – guitars, production
- Bøddel – bass
- Asklund – drums, recording, mixing, production, mastering

=== Additional personnel ===
- Chris Cannella – guest lead guitar (track 5)
- Fábio Zperandio – guest lead guitar (track 5)
- Henrik "Typhos" Ekeroth – guest lead guitar (track 6)
- Mats Lindfors – mixing, mastering

== Charts ==
Chart (2017)	Peak position
Finnish Albums (Suomen virallinen lista)	42
