= Destroyer (Gorgoroth album) =

Destroyer – or About How to Philosophize with the Hammer

Studio album by Gorgoroth
- Released: 18 May 1998
- Recorded: 1994–1998
- Studios: Grieghallen Studio, Bergen, Norway
- Genre: Black metal
- Length: 37:09
- Languages: English, Norwegian
- Label: Nuclear Blast
- Producer: Infernus

Gorgoroth chronology
Under the Sign of Hell (1997)	Destroyer – or About How to Philosophize with the Hammer (1998)	Incipit Satan (2000)

Professional ratings
Review scores
Source	Rating
AllMusic	2.5/5 stars
Chronicles of Chaos	9/10
Collector's Guide to Heavy Metal	8/10
Rock Hard	6.5/10

Destroyer (subtitled as: Or About How to Philosophize with the Hammer) is the fourth studio album by Norwegian black metal band Gorgoroth. It was their first release on Nuclear Blast. It contains eight tracks performed by several different lineups, with band founder Infernus being the only member to be featured on all tracks. Four different vocalists were featured on the album, including Infernus on two tracks, Pest on four tracks, and T-Reaper and new vocalist Gaahl each on one track.

Destroyer was the first album to feature Gaahl and guitarist Tormentor, the only one for T-Reaper and drummer Vrolok, the last to feature Pest until his return in 2008, and the last for drummer Frost until his return in 2004.

The album was re-released in 2006 by Back on Black Records as a gatefold vinyl LP. The subtitle of the album, Or About How to Philosophize with the Hammer, was also the subtitle of Friedrich Nietzsche's book Twilight of the Idols (itself a future Gorgoroth album title).

== Track listing ==
No	Title	Lyrics	Music	Vocals	Guitars	Bass	Drums	Length
1	"Destroyer"	Infernus	Tormentor	Gaahl	Tormentor	Infernus		3:49
2	"Open the Gates"	Pest	Infernus	Pest	Infernus / Tormentor	Ares	Vrolok	5:29
3	"The Devil, the Sinner and His Journey"	Infernus	Infernus	T-Reaper	Infernus	Infernus	Frost	3:26
4	"Om kristen og jodisk tru" ("About Christian and Jewish Faith")	Pest	Infernus	Pest	Infernus / Tormentor	Ares	Vrolok	4:47
5	"Pa slagmark langt mot nord" ("On Battlefields Far North")	Pest	Infernus	Pest	Infernus / Tormentor	Infernus		5:08
6	"Blodoffer" ("Blood Offering")	Infernus, Tormentor		Infernus	Infernus / Tormentor	Infernus		3:19
7	"The Virginborn"	Pest	Infernus	Pest	Infernus / Tormentor	Ares	Vrolok	8:15
8	"Slottet i det fjerne" (Darkthrone cover)	Fenriz		Infernus				3:41
Total length								37:09

== Personnel ==
Gorgoroth

- Infernus – guitars (tracks 2–7), bass (tracks 1, 3, 5 and 6), vocals (tracks 6 and 8), drums (tracks 5 and 6), drum programming (track 1), mixing (February 1998 at Abyss Studio), producer

Additional musicians

- Tormentor – guitar (1, 2, 4–8), bass and drums (track 8)
- Pest – vocals (tracks 2, 4, 5 and 7)
- Gaahl – vocals (track 1), mixing
- Ares – bass (tracks 2, 4 and 7)
- Daimonion – synthesizer (track 3)
- Frost – drums (track 3)
- T-Reaper – vocals (track 3)
- Vrolok – drums (tracks 2, 4 and 7)

Production

- Pytten – engineering (Grieghallen Studio)
- Peter Tägtgren – mixing
