= Tormentor (musician) =

Norwegian guitarist and vocalist

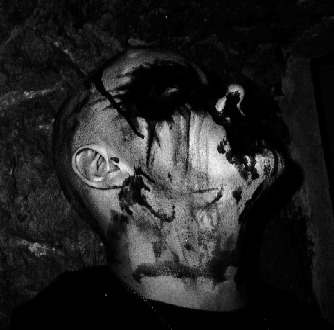

Background information
- Born: July 5, 1972 (age 52); Geilo, Norway
- Genres: Black metal
- Instrument(s): Guitar, vocals
- Years active: 1996–present
- Labels: Regain, Southern Lord
- Member of: Gorgoroth, Orcustus, Desekrator, Gaahlskagg, Norwegian Evil

Tormentor (born 1972) is a Norwegian black metal musician who is best known for his work as guitarist with the black metal band Gorgoroth.

== Biography ==
Tormentor joined Infernus in Gorgoroth in 1996, and participated as guitarist and songwriter on the two Gorgoroth albums Destroyer (1998) and Incipit Satan (2000), both albums released by Nuclear Blast. He toured with Gorgoroth both in Europe and South America. He left the band in 2002 due to no longer being able to cooperate with bassist King ov Hell, but returned for a one-off concert in Bergen, Norway, in 2003. In late 2007, after internal conflicts in Gorgoroth resulted in the departure of King and vocalist Gaahl, Infernus announced that Tormentor would assist him in the pre-production of the next Gorgoroth album, Quantos Possunt ad Satanitatem Trahunt. In September 2008, Tormentor officially rejoined Gorgoroth.

In addition to his work with Gorgoroth, in 2002 Tormentor was one of the founding members of Orcustus, together with Taipan, Infernus, and Dirge Rep. After releasing a demo and two 7" vinyl singles, Orcustus' debut full-length album was released in 2009 by Southern Lord Records.

Tormentor also participated on the album Metal for Demons (1998) by the thrash metal side project Desekrator, featuring members of Gorgoroth, Old Funeral and Enslaved. He has also appeared as bassist on releases by Gaahlskagg, and together with Infernus (as Norwegian Evil) he covered Von's Satanic Blood on a 2005 tribute double 7".

== Discography ==
=== Gorgoroth ===
- Darkthrone Holy Darkthrone (tribute album to Darkthrone) (Song: "Slottet i det fjerne") (1998)
- Destroyer (1998)
- Incipit Satan (2000)
- Originators of the Northern Darkness – A Tribute to Mayhem (tribute album to Mayhem) (Song: "Life Eternal") (2001)

=== Orcustus ===
- Demo 2002 (2002)
- World Dirtnap 7" (2003)
- Wrathrash 7" (2005)
- Orcustus (2009)

=== Desekrator ===
- Demo (1997)
- Metal for Demons (1998)
- Hot in the City/Overdose/Take Us to the Pub (3 x 7" picture vinyl) (1999)

=== Gaahlskagg ===
- Erotic Funeral Party I (split with Stormfront) (1999)
- Erotic Funeral (2000)

=== Norwegian Evil ===
- A Norwegian Hail to VON – gatefold double 7" with Amok, Taake and Urgehal) (2005)
