= Hole in the Sky (festival) =

Norwegian music festival

- Genre: Black metal, death metal, doom metal
- Locations: Bergen, Norway
- Years active: 2000–2011
- Website: holeinthesky.no (archived)

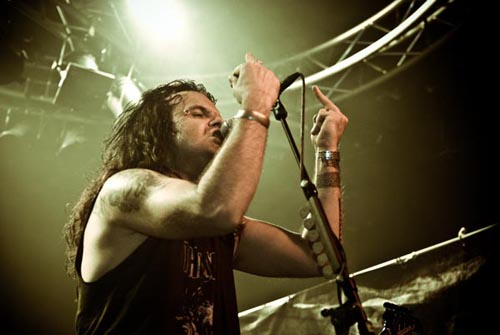
Miland 'Mille' Petrozza of Kreator, live at Hole In The Sky, Bergen Metal Fest 2007

Hole in the Sky was a Norwegian extreme metal festival held in Bergen that took place at the end of August each year from 2000 to 2011. The first event was held in 2000 in honor of the then recently deceased Erik "Grim" Brødreskift, ex-member of Borknagar, Gorgoroth and Immortal. The festival was named after the eponymous song by Black Sabbath.

The last edition of the festival took place in August 2011.

== See also ==
- Inferno Metal Festival
- Beyond the Gates
- Midgardsblot
