= Antichrist (Gorgoroth album) =

Studio album by Gorgoroth
- Released: 3 June 1996
- Recorded: 19 December 1994 – 19 January 1996, Grieghallen Studio
- Genre: Black metal
- Length: 25:07
- Label: Malicious
- Producer: Infernus, Pytten

Gorgoroth chronology
| Pentagram (1994) | Antichrist (1996) | Under the Sign of Hell (1997) |

Alternative cover

Professional ratings
Review scores
| Source | Rating |
|---|---|
| About.com | 3.5/5 stars |
| AllMusic | 3.5/5 stars |

Antichrist is the second studio album by Norwegian black metal band Gorgoroth. The working title of the album was Død (meaning death or dead). It was released by Malicious Records on 3 June 1996 on vinyl (limited to 500 copies) and CD. It was re-released several times: by Century Black in 1999, as a remastered version by Season of Mist in 2005, on vinyl in 2005 on Agonia Records (limited to 1000 copies), and on vinyl in 2006 on Back on Black Records. The latter was released in a gatefold sleeve, and included a guitar pick signed by Infernus. It was the first album to feature Pest on vocals and Frost on drums, and the last album to feature Hat on vocals.

== Track listing ==
=== Season of Mist re-release ===
The Season of Mist re-release included a 13-second instrumental, although the album cover still only lists the original six tracks. According to iTunes, this song is called "Wind".

All music is composed by Infernus.

| No. | Title | Lyrics | Length |
|---|---|---|---|
| 1. | "En stram lukt av kristent blod" ("A Rank Smell of Christian Blood") | instrumental | 0:20 |
| 2. | "Bergtrollets hevn" ("Mountain Troll's Revenge") | Hat | 3:51 |
| 3. | "Gorgoroth" | Hat | 6:04 |
| 4. | "Possessed (By Satan)" | Infernus | 4:50 |
| 5. | "Heavens Fall" | instrumental | 3:40 |
| 6. | "Sorg" (Sorrow) | Hat | 6:13 |
| Total length: | | | 25:20 |

== Credits ==
=== Gorgoroth ===
- Infernus – guitar, bass
- Frost – drums

=== Vocals ===
- Hat – tracks 2, 3 and 6
- Pest – "Possessed (By Satan)"
