= Incipit Satan =

Studio album by Gorgoroth
- Released: 7 February 2000
- Recorded: July, August, and October 1999 at Sunlight Studio in Stockholm
- Genre: Black metal
- Length: 36:48
- Label: Nuclear Blast
- Producers: Gorgoroth, Jocke Petterson

Gorgoroth chronology
Destroyer (1998)	Incipit Satan (2000)	Twilight of the Idols (2003)

Professional ratings
Review scores
Source	Rating
Allmusic	4/5 stars
Kerrang!	3/5 stars

Incipit Satan is the fifth full-length album by Norwegian black metal band Gorgoroth. It was released on 7 February 2000 by Nuclear Blast, and reissued in 2006 by Back on Black Records. Incipit Satan was the first album with King ov Hell as bassist, the last album to feature Tormentor on guitar and the only one with Sjt. Erichsen on drums. The band members dedicated the album to their deceased friend and former bandmate Erik Brødreskift (a.k.a. "Grim").

In 2013, Decibel ranked Incipit Satan at number 68 on its list of the Top 100 Black Metal Albums of All Time.

== Track listing ==
No.	Title	Lyrics	Music	Length
1.	"Incipit Satan"	Gaahl	Tormentor	4:33
2.	"A World to Win"	Infernus	Infernus, Tormentor	3:43
3.	"Litani til Satan"	Charles Baudelaire	Infernus	4:33
4.	"Unchain My Heart!!!"	Infernus	Infernus	4:47
5.	"An Excerpt of X"	Infernus	Infernus	5:50
6.	"Ein eim av blod og helvetesild ("A Reek of Blood and Hellfire")"	Gaahl	Infernus, Tormentor	3:09
7.	"Will to Power"	Gaahl	Daimonion, King ov Hell	4:28
8.	"When Love Rages Wild in My Heart"	Infernus	Infernus	5:43
Total length:				36:48

== Personnel ==
- Gaahl – vocals, vocal arrangements (tracks 1–4, 6, 7)
- Infernus – guitars, bass, drums, vocals (track 5)
- Tormentor – guitars, additional vocals (track 4)
- King ov Hell – bass
- Sjt. Erichsen – drums
- Daimonion – synthesizer, piano
- Mickey Faust – vocals (track 8)

=== Production ===
- Gorgoroth – production, editing
- Jocke Petterson – production, recording, engineering, mixing, mastering
- Infernus – mixing, mastering
- Herr Brandt – editing, mixing, mastering
- Mia – editing
