= Twilight of the Idols (Gorgoroth album) =

Twilight of the Idols (In Conspiracy with Satan)

Studio album by Gorgoroth
- Released: 12 August 2003
- Recorded: May 2002 – January 2003
- Studio: Shimmer Recordings, Bergen
- Genre: Black metal
- Length: 32:36
- Label: Nuclear Blast
- Producer: Gorgoroth

Gorgoroth chronology
| Incipit Satan (2000) | Twilight of the Idols (In Conspiracy with Satan) (2003) | Ad Majorem Sathanas Gloriam (2006) |

Professional ratings
Review scores
| Source | Rating |
|---|---|
| Allmusic | 4/5 stars |

Twilight of the Idols (In Conspiracy with Satan) is the sixth studio album by Norwegian black metal band Gorgoroth. It was released on 12 August 2003 by Nuclear Blast and reissued in 2006 by Back on Black Records. It is the band's only album to feature drummer Kvitrafn.

The album is the first to not feature Infernus as the main songwriter. The majority of the music was instead composed by bassist King ov Hell and Kvitrafn. The track "Of Ice and Movement..." is dedicated to Frost, long time Satyricon and former Gorgoroth drummer.

== Track listing ==
All lyrics are written by Gaahl, except where noted.

| No. | Title | Lyrics | Music | Length |
|---|---|---|---|---|
| 1. | "Procreating Satan" | | Kvitrafn | 3:43 |
| 2. | "Proclaiming Mercy - Damaging Instinct of Man" | | King ov Hell | 2:56 |
| 3. | "Exit - Through Carved Stones" | | King ov Hell | 5:46 |
| 4. | "Teeth Grinding" | | King ov Hell | 4:34 |
| 5. | "Forces of Satan Storms" | Infernus | King ov Hell | 4:35 |
| 6. | "Blod og minne" ("Blood and Memory") | | King ov Hell | 3:27 |
| 7. | "Of Ice and Movement..." | | Kvitrafn; Herbrand Larsen; (Note: Larsen is credited as composer for the outro.) | 6:42 |
| 8. | "Domine in Virtute tua Laetabitur Rex" | | Infernus | 0:53 |
| Total length: | | | | 32:36 |

== Personnel ==
Gorgoroth

- Gaahl – vocals, vocal arrangements
- Infernus – guitar
- King ov Hell – bass
- Kvitrafn – drums

Additional personnel

- Herbrand – engineer
- Brynjulf – engineer
- May Husby – cover design
- Peter Beste – photography
