= Gorgoroth =

Norwegian black metal band

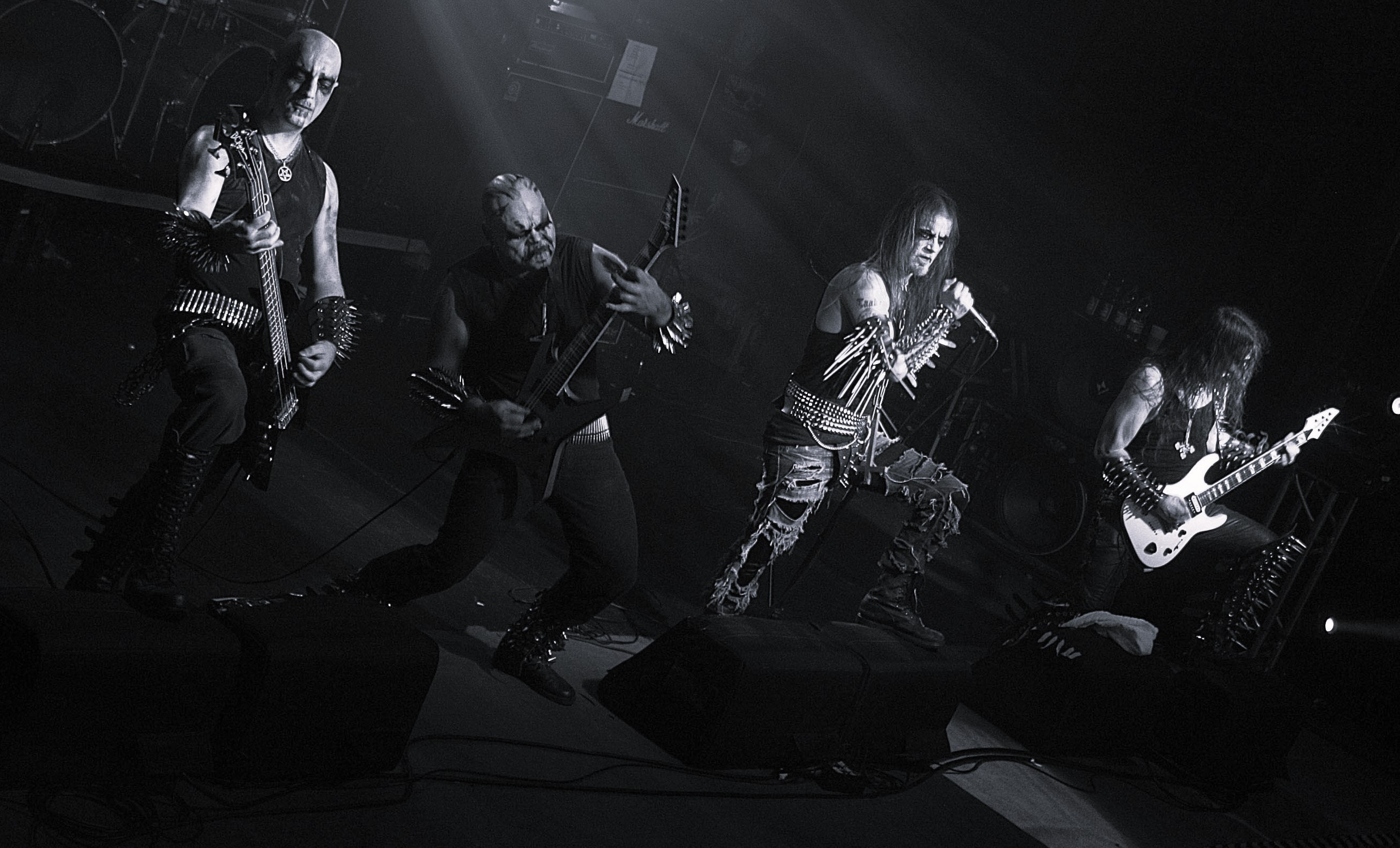
- Gorgoroth live in Brazil, 2012

Background information
- Origin: Hyllestad, Sognefjord, Norway
- Genre: Black metal
- Years active: 1992–present
- Labels: Soulseller; Embassy Productions; Malicious; Candlelight; Century Media; Nuclear Blast; Season of Mist; Forces of Satan; Regain
- Spinoffs: Wardruna
- Members: Infernus; Tomas Asklund; Atterigner
- Past members: Full list
- Website: gorgoroth.info (archive)

Gorgoroth is a Norwegian black metal band based in Bergen. It was formed in 1992 by guitarist Infernus, the sole original member remaining. They have released nine studio albums. Gorgoroth are a Satanic band and have drawn controversy due to some of their concerts featuring impaled sheep heads and mock crucifixions. The band is named after the dead plateau of darkness in the land of Mordor from J. R. R. Tolkien's The Lord of the Rings.

== History ==
=== Early years (1992–1995) ===
Poster for a Gorgoroth concert in Bergen, Norway (24 September 1994), alongside Enslaved

Guitarist Infernus founded Gorgoroth in 1992. In 1993, the band released the demo A Sorcery Written in Blood. On 7 January 1994, Firda, a newspaper in the county of Sogn og Fjordane where the band originated, ran a cover story on the demo, with the headline "Local music with Satanic symbolism". According to the article, the demo and flyers with Satanic symbols led to "concerned parents contacting the Sheriff's Office in Fjaler". After the demo, Gorgoroth signed with Embassy Productions and started work on Pentagram. When bassist Kjettar left the band in 1993, Samoth of Emperor Gorgoroth replaced him, and participated in the recording of the album. After Pentagram was completed and released in 1994, drummer Goat left the band and was replaced with Frost from Satyricon. The band performed their first concert at Lusa Lottes Pøbb in Oslo on 3 May 1994 at a four-day Black Metal Nights festival with bands such as Dark Funeral, Dissection, Enslaved, Marduk, Gehenna and Hades Almighty.

This was followed by shows with Enslaved in Bergen in June and September, and in Haugesund in November. The band performed their first show abroad in Annaberg-Buchholz in Germany on 10 December 1994. The year, the band recorded Antichrist (originally Død), their second album.

=== With Pest (1995–1997) ===
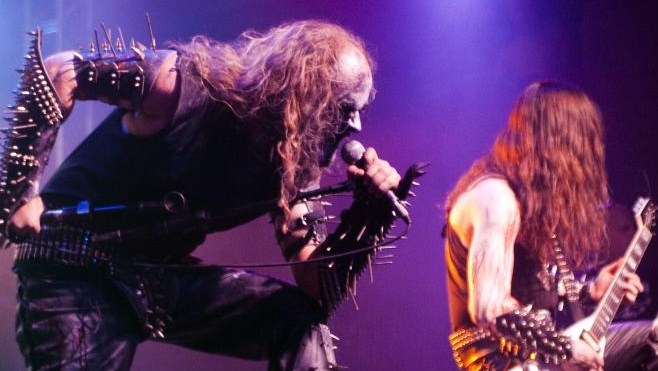
Pest (left) and Infernus in 2010

Vocalist Hat left Gorgoroth in September 1995, but agreed to finish recording the vocal tracks for Antichrist. After Hat left, Infernus recruited vocalist Pest from Obtained Enslavement. In December 1995, the band supported Cradle of Filth at the London Astoria, a show that also included Primordial. This was the first Gorgoroth live appearance of vocalist Pest and bassist Ares. In 1995, the band rejected an offer from Moonfog Productions in favour of Malicious Records. Malicious Records released Antichrist in 1996, and re-released Pentagram. The band toured Europe with Satyricon and Dissection in April 1996, followed by a show in Bergen with Hades Almighty and Gehenna, at which the live EP The Last Tormentor was recorded. The band played a show in the fall in Bischofswerda, Germany, with Behemoth. Gorgoroth became commonplace in the black metal underground, in Norway and the rest of Europe, if somewhat overshadowed by Mayhem or Emperor. The band recorded Under the Sign of Hell in spring 1996, and guitarist Tormentor joined the band later that year. Under the Sign of Hell was released in 1997, and Gorgoroth headlined a European tour in fall 1997, with support by Mystic Circle. On this tour, German heavy metal record label Nuclear Blast approached Infernus and Tormentor to sign the band. The band signed in late 1997.

=== Tenure with Nuclear Blast (1997–2003) ===
The move to Nuclear Blast was controversial among underground black metal purists. The first album recorded and released for Nuclear Blast was Destroyer (1998). Singer Gaahl joined the band at this time, but sang only on the title track. Infernus wrote most of the music and lyrics , but guitarist Tormentor contributed on the title track, and former vocalist Pest wrote the lyrics on four tracks. In May 1998, Gorgoroth played five dates in Germany on Cradle of Filth's European tour, with support from Old Man's Child and Einherjer. Gorgoroth performed at Wacken Open Air in summer 1998, and at the Tuska Open Air Metal Festival in Helsinki, Finland, and in Oslo, Norway with Gehenna and Dødheimsgard.

In 1999, Gorgoroth recorded Incipit Satan. Though mainly written by Infernus, the album delved into new musical ideas. Songs such as "Will to Power" showcased more industrial, dark ambient and noise influences than Destroyer and Under the Sign of Hell, both of which showed signs of experimentation. "When Love Rages Wild in My Heart" featured clean, bluesy vocals. The album displayed progressive tendencies, yet retained traditional black metal and Infernus' sound. The album was recorded during 1999, after drummer Vrolok and bassist T-Reaper had left the band and been replaced with drummer Erlend Erichsen (a.k.a. Sjt. Erichsen) and bassist King ov Hell. Erichsen left the band after the recording. Incipit Satan was released in 2000, preceded by a European tour in December 1999, supporting Morbid Angel. In May 2000, Gorgoroth headlined a European tour with bands like Old Man's Child and Krisiun as supporting acts. In early June 2000, Gorgoroth performed at the first Hole in the Sky festival in Bergen, Norway. This festival was arranged in memory of former Gorgoroth drummer Grim, and included bands such as Immortal, Enslaved, Obtained Enslavement, Hades Almighty and Aeternus. On 23 June 2000, Gorgoroth headlined the "Knüppelnacht" stage at the With Full Force festival in Leipzig, Germany.

After a couple of Norwegian concerts in 2000 and 2001, Gorgoroth made their only live appearance in the US at the Milwaukee Metalfest in August 2001. In September and October 2001, the band went on two mini tours of Mexico and Colombia. In 2001, Gorgoroth was featured on a tribute album to Norwegian black metal band Mayhem, with a cover version of that band's "Life Eternal" from the De Mysteriis Dom Sathanas album. This song had been recorded in 1998 and featured Gaahl on vocals, as well as Infernus and Tormentor on rhythm guitars, T-Reaper on lead guitar and bass, and Vrolok on drums. This is the only released Gorgoroth recording that has not appeared on a full-length Gorgoroth album. In February 2002, Gaahl was taken into custody after being accused of beating a man at an afterparty. The singer was sentenced to 12 months in prison in 2002, due to an already existing unserved 1-year sentence for previously committed acts of violence.

In 2002, Tormentor quit the band due to no longer being able to cooperate with King, ending the line-up of Gaahl, Infernus, Tormentor, King ov Hell and Kvitrafn, formed in 2000. Following Tormentor's departure, Gorgoroth began recording Twilight of the Idols, in Bergen. The album showed a return to a more solidified black metal style, but was still quite different from early Gorgoroth releases, mainly due to the fact that most of the album's songs were written by bassist King and drummer Kvitrafn rather than Infernus. The band played their first live gig in a year and a half at Garage in Bergen in April 2003, with Tormentor returning as guitarist for a one-off show. Twilight of the Idols was released by Nuclear Blast in May 2003, and the band subsequently performed at Hole in the Sky in Bergen in August 2003. This marked the first Gorgoroth live appearance of session guitarist Apollyon of Aura Noir.

=== Controversy in Kraków (2004) ===
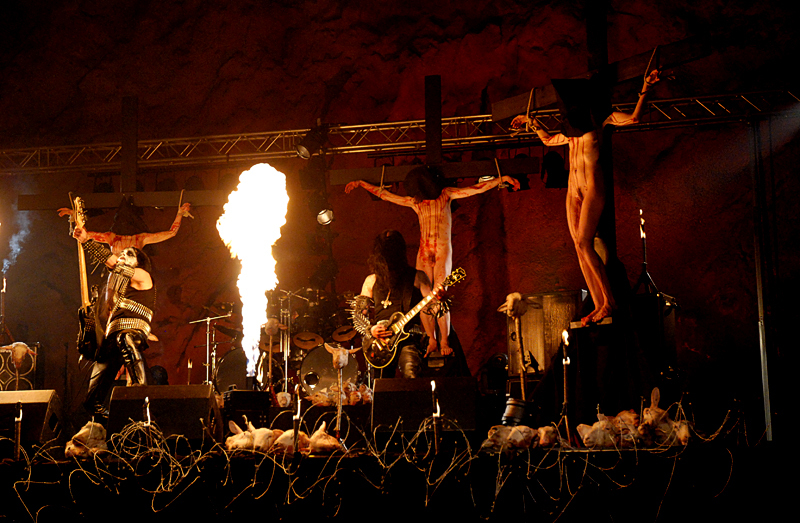
Video shoot for "Carving a Giant", a recreation of the controversial Kraków performance

On 1 February 2004, during a concert being recorded for a DVD in Kraków, Poland, the band displayed sheep heads on stakes, a bloodbath of 80 litres of sheep's blood, Satanic symbols, and four naked crucified real-life models on stage. A police investigation took place with allegations of religious offence (which is prosecutable under Polish law) and cruelty to animals. Though these charges were considered, the band was not charged as it was ruled that they were unaware of the fact that what they were doing was illegal, although the concert organiser was eventually fined 10,000 zł in 2007 as he knew about it and neither informed the band that it was against the law nor intervened. The whole controversy led to the band being dropped from the roster of the Nuclear Blast Tour and the footage of the concert being confiscated by the police. Following this controversy – and with Gorgoroth also having achieved a larger degree of worldwide recognition through Nuclear Blast's distribution facilities – the contract between both parties was bilaterally terminated. Gorgoroth further secured a reputation as a band with a vehement anti-right-hand path agenda, regarding which certain employees in the company were alleged to have felt uneasy due to their own personal beliefs.

After a successful South American tour of Brazil, Chile and Argentina, and a performance at Norway's Inferno Festival, it was announced in April 2004 that drummer Kvitrafn had decided to leave the band. For the band's European and Central American headlining tours of October and November 2004, drummer Dirge Rep (ex-Enslaved, Gehenna) and guitarist Teloch (Nidingr) were recruited.

=== Ad Majorem Sathanas Gloriam (2005–2007) ===
In early 2005, Infernus and a friend were sentenced to three years in prison for repeatedly raping a woman at an after-party in his apartment in 2003, and subsequently appealed the decision. After various shows around Europe in the first half of 2005, including the With Full Force Festival in July, Gorgoroth then went out on a month-long European tour with 1349 in November 2005, this time with Skagg (Gaahlskagg) replacing Teloch as live guitarist. On 10 December 2005, Gorgoroth played live in Trondheim, Norway, a gig which was to be their last live performance until summer 2007.

In January 2006, Infernus was acquitted of his previous rape conviction, but convicted of gross negligent rape and sentenced to one year in prison, while his friend's sentence was upheld. Gorgoroth released Ad Majorem Sathanas Gloriam in June 2006 through Regain Records. This was only the second Gorgoroth album to be released since 2000's Incipit Satan – a noticeable reduction in productivity from a band that had previously released 2 demos, 5 full-length albums and 1 live EP between 1993 and 2000. For the recording of the new album, Frost again performed on the drums. This album helped the band to expand its fan base. A short time after the album was released, bassist King temporarily left the band. According to the official website, King left because he "had problems fronting some of the ideological aspects of his band GORGOROTH's agenda". In a later interview, King stated that he left the Gorgoroth due to being dissatisfied with Infernus' lack of contributions to the band and was asked to rejoin the band by Gaahl in 2007. Gorgoroth was nominated in the "Metal" category at the 35th annual Spellemann Awards for Ad Majorem Sathanas Gloriam (the Norwegian equivalent to the Grammy Awards).

Gaahl served a sentence in jail from spring to December 2006 for the assault which happened in February 2002, and Infernus served a 4-month sentence for his rape conviction between October 2006 and March 2007. When the latter was released on parole, it was reported that Infernus had started "working on new material, both music and lyrics for an upcoming album, title yet undecided".

In January 2007, it was reported that Gaahl was under investigation by Norwegian Police for his comments in an interview in Metal: A Headbanger's Journey (2005), which had been broadcast on Norway's Lydverket NRK 1 on 24 January 2007, where he said "church burnings are things that I support one-hundred percent, and they should have been done much more and will be done much more in the future". In April 2007, a 5-part series entitled True Norwegian Black Metal, produced by Peter Beste for Vice, aired on VBS.tv, covering some of the aspects of Gaahl's life. With King back in the band, the video for "Carving a Giant" off Ad Majorem Sathanas Gloriam was also filmed and broadcast on Norwegian MTV that month.

In July and August 2007, Gorgoroth returned to the live arena with performances at festivals in Norway, Germany and the Czech Republic. In September 2007, the band went on a South American tour of Brazil, Colombia, Argentina, Ecuador and Chile with Belphegor. These would be the last Gorgoroth concerts to feature Gaahl and King.

=== Quantos Possunt ad Satanitatem Trahunt (2007–2011) ===
In October 2007, Infernus announced the decision of Gaahl and King ov Hell to part ways on the band's official Myspace page. Gaahl and King claimed that they had "fired" Infernus from Gorgoroth and claimed the rights to the name of the band, with King having made a trademark application the previous month. The duo explained in an interview that they tried to fire Infernus due to the guitarist having no interest in promoting the band or participating creatively and his behaviour after being released from prison, along with the claim of having "creatively defined" the band through the past eight years. King also cited feeling averse to being associated with Infernus both during and after the latter's trial and conviction for rape. The dispute was concluded in March 2009 when a court verdict was announced, which recognised Infernus as the legitimate user of the name and that Gaahl and King had excluded themselves from Gorgoroth upon attempting to remove the founding member.

Shortly after parting ways with Gaahl and King, Infernus said that he was in the process of finishing and preparing the material he reportedly started in October 2006 and was first reported writing when he was released on parole in March 2007, declaring the title to be Quantos Possunt ad Satanitatem Trahunt, to be released on Regain Records. He also stated that future live performances would minimise use of the Gorgoroth songs written between 2002 and 2004 (although only three songs by King ov Hell and two by Kvitrafn – four of which had lyrics written by Gaahl – were ever performed live), and that priority would be given to both older and brand new material. In December 2007, he revealed Tomas Asklund and Frank Watkins had joined Gorgoroth as drummer and bassist, respectively. Watkins later took the stage name "Bøddel", which is the Norwegian word for "Executioner", the old name of Obituary.

In April 2008, Infernus announced he was to depart for Stockholm, Sweden, where the next few months were spent rehearsing the material for Quantos Possunt ad Satanitatem Trahunt in Tomas Asklund's Monolith Studio.

The controversial 2004 Kraków concert was finally released on DVD in June 2008, more than 4 years after its recording. It was released by Metal Mind Productions under the title Black Mass Krakow 2004, and entered the Norwegian music DVD chart at position 4 in its first week of release. It remained in the charts for five weeks, peaking at a number 3 position.

On 30 May 2008, Regain Records announced the June 2008 release of True Norwegian Black Metal - Live in Grieghallen, a new Gorgoroth album which had been recorded live in studio in mid-October 2007. The recording line-up consisted of Infernus on guitars and bass, Gaahl on vocals, Teloch on session guitars, and Garghuf on session drums. However, ostensibly in part due to the circumstances of the ongoing name dispute, the distribution of the album was temporarily halted in July 2008, with the final decision to be made in a yet-to-be announced trial in Sweden.

Infernus also announced in August that a pre-recording for Quantos Possunt ad Satanitatem Trahunt was made with guitars, bass and drums. After having spent the previous few months rehearsing in Monolith Studio, Infernus said that he was working on arrangements with assistance from former Gorgoroth guitarist Tormentor.

In September 2008, Infernus announced Tormentor had accepted his offer to rejoin Gorgoroth, together with Tomas Asklund and Bøddel. On 4 December 2008, it was announced that Pest had returned as the vocalist.

Shortly after the conclusion of the Gorgoroth name dispute, recording of Quantos Possunt ad Satanitatem Trahunt began when Tomas Asklund commenced with the drum tracks in Monolith Studio. Infernus "manually recorded six basic guitars" for the album, and Bøddel and Pest recorded bass and vocals respectively in June.

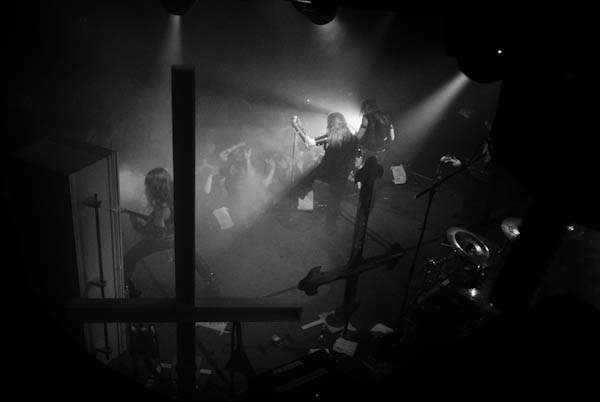
Gorgoroth live at Hole in the Sky 2009

In May 2009, it was announced that Gorgoroth would play live again on 29 August 2009 at the 10th anniversary edition of the Hole in the Sky festival in Bergen, Norway. This would be the band's first live appearance since September 2007.

In late June 2009, it was announced that the vocals on True Norwegian Black Metal - Live in Grieghallen were rerecorded by Pest. A week later the release dates and track listing for Quantos Possunt ad Satanitatem Trahunt were revealed.

At the band's headlining concert at the Hole in the Sky festival on 29 August the set list consisted mainly of older material, including two songs off the Pentagram album which had not been performed live since October 1997. The band also performed live, for the very first time, the new song "Aneuthanasia" off Quantos Possunt ad Satanitatem Trahunt. Gorgoroth also performed at UKA 2009 in Trondheim, Norway, on 19 October 2009. This concert coincided with the release of Quantos Possunt ad Satanitatem Trahunt.

Upon its release the album was well received, with many reviewers commenting on the band's return to its roots, comparing the album with earlier releases like Antichrist (1996). It was revealed in October 2009 that work on the follow-up to Quantos Possunt ad Satanitatem Trahunt, including rehearsals by Infernus and Tomas Asklund in Stockholm, had taken place around that time. On 1 April 2010, it was officially announced that half of the yet-to-be-titled new album had been prerecorded in pre-production form, and that work on the album would continue through the year in between touring and festival appearances, with a tentative 2011 release date.

In April 2010 Gorgoroth embarked on a mini-tour of Europe consisting of five dates in Germany as well as one each in France, Belgium, Italy and the Netherlands, to promote Quantos Possunt ad Satanitatem Trahunt. The band also performed at five European festivals in summer 2010: Germany's Summer Breeze Open Air festival, the Ragnarök Festival in Germany, Brutal Assault in the Czech Republic, Bloodstock Open Air in the UK, and the Finnish festival Jalometalli. In September 2010, Gorgoroth embarked on a mini-tour in South America and were announced to be touring Europe again in November 2010 after switching to Massive Music booking agency.

It was announced in October 2010 that the band was about to put the finishing touches on a re-recording of their 1997 release Under the Sign of Hell. The re-recording, with Pest on vocals and Tomas Asklund on drums, was released as Under the Sign of Hell 2011 in December 2011. Phobos of Aeternus joined the band as a live drummer earlier that year.

=== Instinctus Bestialis and Bøddel's death (2012–present) ===
In August 2012, Pest notified the band members that he would not be able to take part in Gorgoroth's September 2012 tour of Latin America. In response, Infernus fired Pest from the band and announced that Hoest of Taake would perform vocals for the band's coming tour, while Atterigner of the Serbian band Triumfall would be the vocalist for Gorgoroth's next studio album, titled Instinctus Bestialis.

The album was recorded in autumn 2013, with mixing being completed by June 2014 and mastering finished the following month. On 6 March 2015, the album artwork and track listing was revealed, along with a release date. Instinctus Bestialis was released in June 2015.

On 18 October 2015, bassist Bøddel (Frank Watkins) died from cancer.

In 2019, Infernus and Phobos announced creation of their own beer, Radix Malorum, in collaboration with Lysefjorden Microbrewery.

In early August 2023, Infernus was assaulted and hospitalized following the band's appearance at the Beyond the Gates Festival in Bergen, which led to the cancellation of a planned tour of Mexico in October.

On 29 March 2024, Atterigner performed live with the band for the first time at the Inferno Metal Festival in Oslo.

== Suppression of lyrics and tablature ==
Gorgoroth not only refuses to publish their lyrics but also actively suppresses any public showings of fan-written reconstructions. The reason for this suppression is not fully known, though Infernus has expressed disdain towards the prospect of material being covered by other bands, among other reasons.

The limited edition of Ad Majorem Sathanas Gloriam on CD did however include the lyrics to the song "Prosperity and Beauty" for reasons unknown.

The metal-lyrics website Darklyrics.com contains the message "Gorgoroth lyrics removed due to copyright complaint by the band", in lieu of any actual lyrics. Lyricsondemand.com displays a cease-and-desist message from Prophecies Publishing.

== Lyrics and satanism ==
Gorgoroth are known for their satanic-themed and anti-Christian lyrics. The band's founder and guitarist Infernus is openly a theistic satanist and considers himself "Satan's minister on Earth". He formed Gorgoroth to express his Satanist beliefs. The band's former vocalist Gaahl is openly anti-Christian. In an interview for the 2005 heavy metal documentary Metal: A Headbanger's Journey, Gaahl was asked what inspired Gorgoroth's music and his reply was simply "Satan". When asked what he believes Satan represents, he said "Freedom".

Gaahl and Infernus were openly supportive of the church burnings perpetrated by members of the black metal scene in the early 1990s. Gaahl further said, "there should have been more of them, and there will be more of them".

== Band members ==
=== Current members ===
The last band statement concerning official members from January 2014 states these musicians. The current state is unclarified.

- Infernus (Roger Tiegs) – guitars, bass, drums, vocals (1992–present)
- Tomas Asklund – drums (2007–present)
- Atterigner (Stefan Todorović) – vocals (2012–present)

=== Current live members ===
- Phobos (Elefterios Santorinios) – drums (2011-2014, 2015–present)
- Guh.Lu (Francesco Giacomin) – bass (2012–present)
- Aindiachaí (Adam Dunlea) – guitars (2017–present)
- Hoest (Ørjan Stedjeberg) – vocals (2012-2013, 2014–present)

=== Former members ===
==== Vocals ====
- Hat (Jan Åge Solstad) (1992–1995)
- Pest (1995–1997, 2008–2012)
- Gaahl (1998–2007)

==== Guitars ====
- Tormentor (1996–2003, 2008–2012)
- Apollyon (2003–2004): session
- Teloch (2004–2005, 2007): session
- Skagg (2005): session
- Fábio Zperandio
- Paimon (Błażej Kazimierz Adamczuk)

==== Bass ====
- Kjettar (1992–1993)
- Samoth (1993–1994)
- Storm (1995)
- Ares (1995–1997)
- T-Reaper (1998–1999)
- King ov Hell (1999–2007)
- Bøddel (2007–2015; died 2015)

==== Drums ====
- Goat Pervertor (Rune Thorsnes) (1992–1994)
- Frost (1994–1995, 2001: session, 2004–2005)
- Grim (1995–1996; died 1999)
- Vrolok (1996–1998)
- Sjt. Erichsen (1999)
- Ivar Thormodsæter (1999): session
- Kvitrafn (Einar Selvik) (2000–2004)
- Dirge Rep (Per Arild Håvarstein) (2004–2007): session
- Garghuf (2007): session
- Vyl (Vegar Larsen) (2009-2011, 2014-2015, 2017)

=== Recording ===
Album	Vocals	Guitar 1	Guitar 2	Bass	Drums
A Sorcery Written in Blood	Hat	Infernus		Kjettar	Goat Pervertor
Pentagram	Hat	Infernus		Samoth	Goat Pervertor
Antichrist	Hat (3 tracks) Pest (1 track)	Infernus			Frost
Under the Sign of Hell	Pest	Infernus		Infernus (7 tracks) Ares (1 track)	Grim
Destroyer	Pest (4 tracks) Gaahl (1 track); T-Reaper (1 track); Infernus (2 tracks)	Infernus	Tormentor	Ares (3 tracks) Infernus (4 tracks)	Infernus (2 tracks) Frost (1 track); Vrolok (3 tracks)
Incipit Satan	Gaahl (6 tracks) Mickey Faust (1 track); Infernus (1 track)	Infernus	Tormentor	King ov Hell	Sjt. Erichsen
Twilight of the Idols	Gaahl	Infernus		King ov Hell	Kvitrafn
Ad Majorem Sathanas Gloriam	Gaahl	Infernus		King ov Hell	Frost
Quantos Possunt ad Satanitatem Trahunt	Pest	Infernus		Bøddel	Tomas Asklund
Instinctus Bestialis	Atterigner	Infernus		Bøddel	Tomas Asklund

== Discography ==
Studio albums

- Pentagram (1994)
- Antichrist (1996)
- Under the Sign of Hell (1997)
- Destroyer or About How to Philosophize with the Hammer (1998)
- Incipit Satan (2000)
- Twilight of the Idols (2003)
- Ad Majorem Sathanas Gloriam (2006)
- Quantos Possunt ad Satanitatem Trahunt (2009)
- Instinctus Bestialis (2015)
