= Arve Isdal =

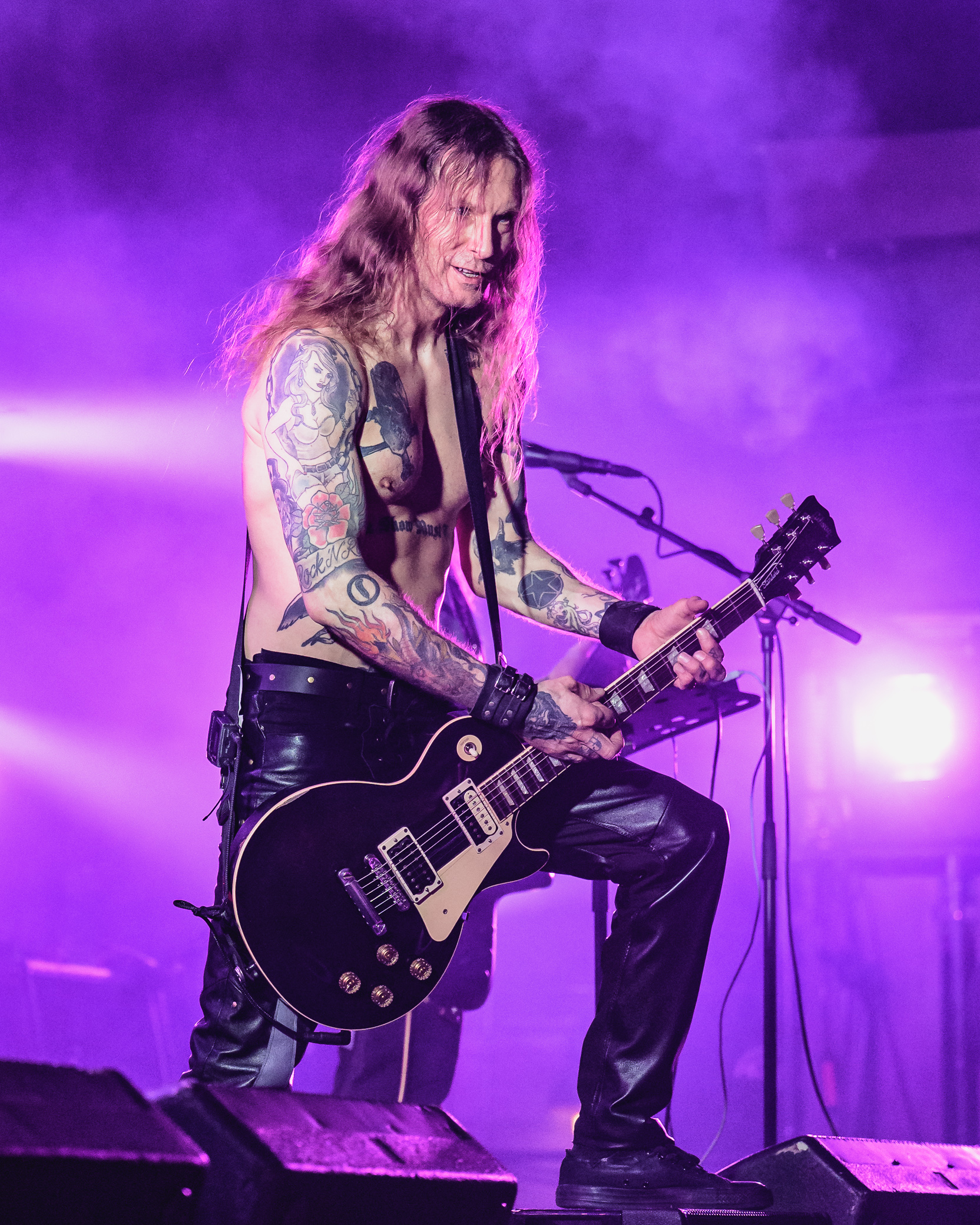
- Isdal live with Enslaved in 2026

Background information
- Also known as: Ice Dale
- Born: Arve Isdal; 28 August 1977 (age 49); Stord, Norway
- Origin: Bergen, Norway
- Genres: Black metal; hard rock; extreme metal; progressive metal; post-grunge; heavy metal; thrash metal
- Occupations: Musician; songwriter; producer; teacher
- Instruments: Guitar; bass
- Years active: 1999–present
- Member of: Enslaved; Audrey Horne; Malignant Eternal; Drott; Hjerteslag
- Formerly of: I; Trinacria; Temple of the Black Moon; Bourbon Flame

Arve Isdal (born 28 August 1977, Bergen, Norway), also known as Ice Dale, is a Norwegian musician and producer, best known as lead guitarist for the extreme metal band Enslaved and the hard rock band Audrey Horne. He owns and runs Conclave & Earshot Studio in Bergen together with former Enslaved band member Herbrand Larsen. In addition to working as a musician and producer, Isdal teaches music production at Noroff.

Isdal has released ten studio albums with Enslaved and seven albums with Audrey Horne. He has won six Norwegian Spellemann Awards: five with Enslaved and one with Audrey Horne.

== Career ==
Isdal was initially influenced by hard rock bands like Kiss, Led Zeppelin, and Deep Purple; and progressive rock bands like Pink Floyd and King Crimson; before discovering heavy metal. He joined his first band, the extreme metal act Malignant Eternal, in the mid 1990s and appeared on their album Alarm in 1999. Isdal joined Enslaved in 2002, and has since appeared on ten studio albums with the band, starting with Below the Lights in 2003. Isdal also became a member of hard rock band Audrey Horne in 2002 and has released seven albums with the band. He toured with former Iron Maiden singer Paul Di'Anno from 2002 to 2003.

In 2006, Isdal participated in the black metal supergroup I along with Abbath of Immortal, King from Gorgoroth, and former-Immortal drummer Armagedda. The band released the studio album Between Two Worlds and played their only show at the Hole in the Sky Festival during that year. In 2007, he released a self-titled album with glam metal band Bourbon Flame. With members of Enslaved and the noise rock group Fe-Mail, Isdal formed the side project Trinacria and released the album Travel Now Journey Infinitely in 2008. That same year, he was part of Gorgoroth's live lineup for their summer tour.

Along with Enslaved's members, Isdal provided his voice for a 2009 episode of the animated series Metalocalypse. Isdal was a session member for the Ov Hell album The Underworld Regime in 2010, and the following year he played guitar and bass on the Demonaz solo album March of the Norse. In the early 2010s, Isdal recorded an unreleased album with the supergroup Temple Of The Black Moon featuring Cradle of Filth vocalist Dani Filth, guitarist Rob Caggiano of Anthrax and Volbeat, bassist King ov Hell, keyboardist Gerlioz from Dimmu Borgir and drummer John Tempesta of The Cult and White Zombie. In 2012, Gorgoroth's performance at Wacken Open Air in 2008 was released as a live album under the God Seed name. In 2021, Isdal played acoustic guitar on Ivar Bjørnson and Einar Selvik's single "Hardanger". Isdal toured with Abbath and his eponymous band as a bassist in late 2022. He produced and performed bass on Immortal's 2023 studio album War Against All.

== Discography ==
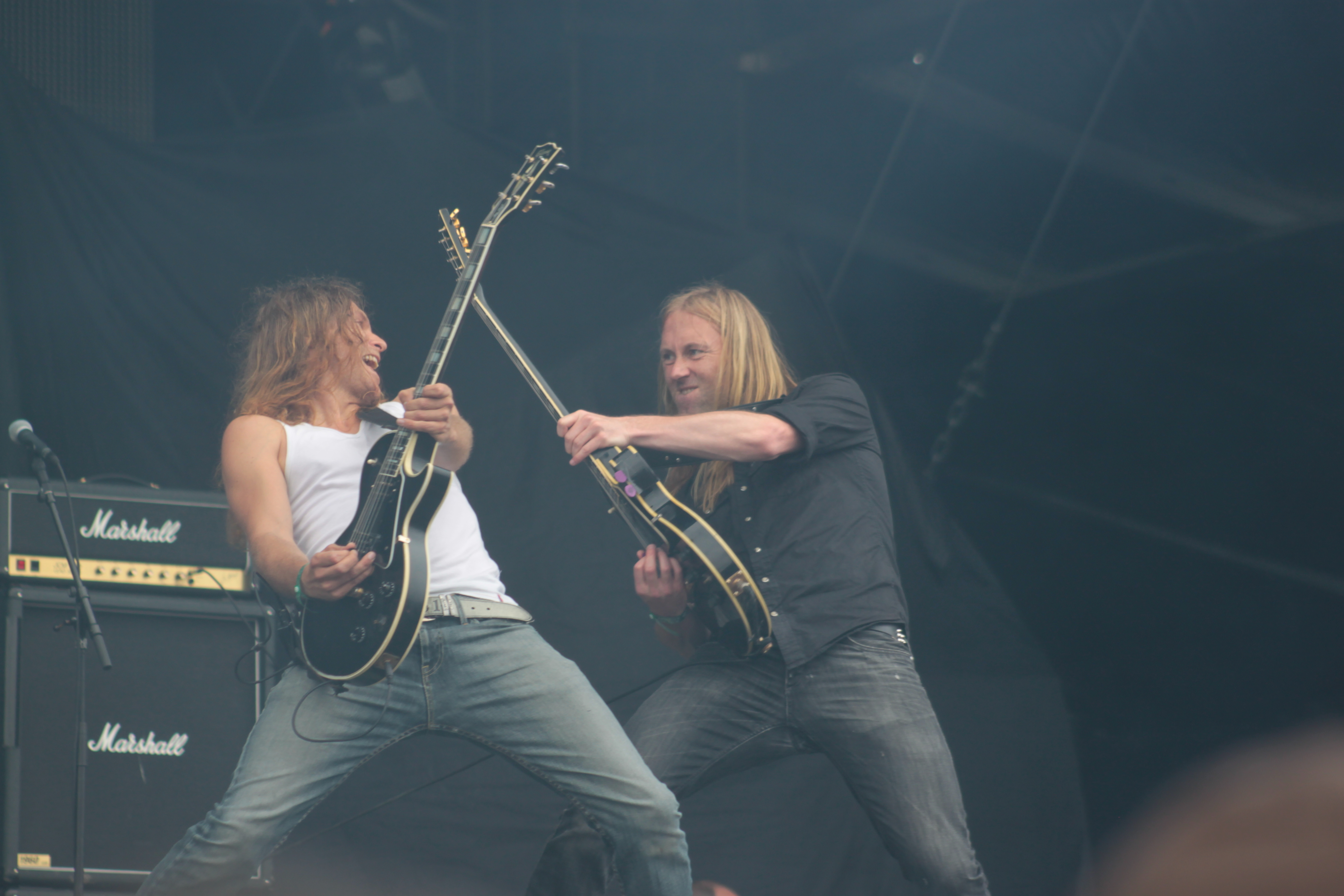
Isdal (left) with Thomas Tofthagen of Audrey Horne in 2013.

=== Enslaved ===
==== Studio albums ====
- Below the Lights (2003)
- Isa (2004)
- Ruun (2006)
- Vertebrae (2008)
- Axioma Ethica Odini (2010)
- RIITIIR (2012)
- In Times (2015)
- E (2017)
- Utgard (2020)
- Heimdal (2023)

==== Live albums ====
- Roadburn Live (2017)

==== Compilation albums ====
- The Sleeping Gods – Thorn (2016)

==== Studio EPs ====
- The Sleeping Gods (2011)
- Thorn (2011)

=== Audrey Horne ===
==== Studio albums ====
- No Hay Banda (2005)
- Le Fol (2007)
- Audrey Horne (2010)
- Youngblood (2013)
- Pure Heavy (2014)
- Blackout (2018)
- Devil's Bell (2022)

==== Live albums ====
- Waiting for the Night (2020)

==== Studio EPs ====
- Confessions & Alcohol (2005)

=== I ===
- Between Two Worlds (2006)

=== Malignant Eternal ===
- Alarm (1999)

=== Bourbon Flame ===
- Bourbon Flame (2007)

=== Trinacria ===
- Travel Now Journey Infinitely (2008)

=== Drott ===
==== Studio albums ====
- Orcus (2021)
- Troll (2023)

==== Studio EPs ====
- Drott (2021)

=== Hjerteslag ===
- Tyvens Dagbok (2022)

=== Production and writing credits ===
Year	Artist	Title	Song(s)	Notes
2005	Octavia Sperati	Winter Enclosure		Co-engineer
2007	Octavia Sperati	Grace Submerged		Co-engineer
2007	Syrach	Days Of Wrath		Producer
2007	Vulture Industries	The Dystopia Journals		Engineer
2010	Gravdal	Torturmantra		Recording engineer
2010	Blodhemn	Brenn Alle Bruer		Engineer
2010	Sahg	III		Co-producer, engineer
2010	Byfrost	Black Earth		Engineer
2011	Byfrost	Of Death		Co-producer
2011	Taake	Noregs Vaapen		Recording engineer
2011	Demonaz	March Of The Norse		Producer
2012	Tortorum	Extinctionist		Engineer
2012	The Gathering	Disclosure		Engineer
2012	Blodhemn	Holmengraa		Engineer
2014	Blodhemn	H7		Engineer
2015	Audrey Horne	Sannhet På Boks - En Hyllest Til Raga Rockers	"Drept Kjendis"	Producer, mixer
2023	Immortal	War Against All		Producer, recording engineer

=== Instrumental and vocal contributions ===
Year	Artist	Title	Song(s)	Instrument
2008	Audrey Horne	Shockadelica: 50th Anniversary Tribute To The Artist Known As Prince	"The Cross"	
2010	Ov Hell	The Underworld Regime	All tracks except "Invoker" and "Perpetual Night"	Guitar
2010	Byfrost	Black Earth	"Desire"	
2011	Demonaz	March Of The Norse		Guitar, bass
2012	God Seed	Live At Wacken		Guitar
2015	Audrey Horne	Sannhet På Boks - En Hyllest Til Raga Rockers	"Drept Kjendis"	Guitar
2021	Ivar Bjørnson & Einar Selvik	–	"Hardanger"	Acoustic guitar
2023	Immortal	War Against All		Guitar, bass

== See also ==
- List of Norwegian musicians
- List of heavy metal musicians
- Music of Norway
