= Herbrand Larsen =

Norwegian musician and producer

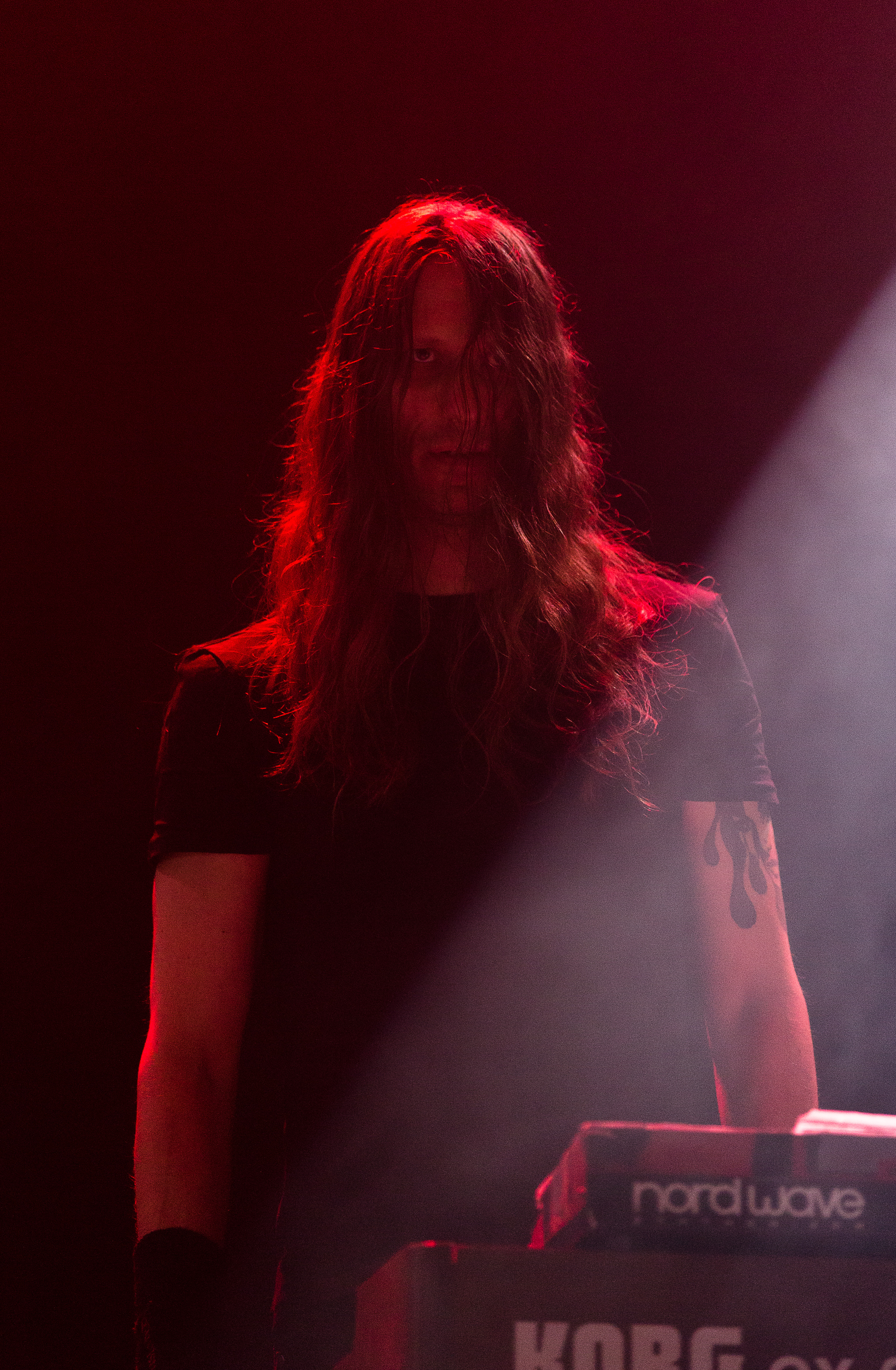
- Larsen live with Enslaved in 2016

Background information
- Born: February 3, 1973 (age 53); Nesbyen, Norway
- Genres: Black metal; extreme metal; hard rock; folk; pop; ambient
- Occupations: Record producer; engineer; musician
- Instruments: Keyboards; vocals
- Years active: 1999–present
- Formerly of: Enslaved; Audrey Horne

Herbrand Larsen (born February 3, 1973) is a Norwegian keyboardist, vocalist, record producer, mixer and engineer. He is best known for being a member of extreme metal band Enslaved from 2004 to 2016 and hard rock band Audrey Horne from 2002 to 2007. Larsen works primarily with acts in the metal and rock genres, including Immortal, Gorgoroth, Taake, Demonaz, Abbath and Gaahl, but has also collaborated with artists in the folk, ambient and pop genres, such as Wardruna, Lindy-Fay Hella, Michelle Ullestad and Hjerteslag.

Larsen has won five Norwegian Spellemann Awards: four with Enslaved and one with Audrey Horne. He owns and runs Conclave & Earshot Studio in Bergen together with former Enslaved bandmate Arve Isdal. In addition to producing music, Larsen also works as a teacher in music production at Noroff.

== Career ==
Larsen started his musical career in the 1990s as a recording engineer and worked as an apprentice under renowned black metal producer Pytten at Grieghallen Studio. He joined the hard rock band Audrey Horne with members of Enslaved, Gorgoroth, Sylvia Wane and Deride as a keyboardist in 2002. Larsen was an engineer on Enslaved's studio albums Monumension and Below the Lights, released in 2001 and 2003 respectively, before joining the band as a keyboardist and clean vocalist in 2004. He released his first album with Enslaved, Isa, that same year.

In 2005, Audrey Horne released their debut album, No Hay Banda, and won the Spelleman Award in the Metal category. Larsen left Audrey Horne in 2007 to focus on Enslaved, but have since contributed keyboard parts and production to the band's later albums and appeared as a live guest. In 2016, Larsen left Enslaved amicably after twelve years and six studio albums with the band. He has since focused on producing other acts in his studio Conclave & Earshot, and teaching music production at Noroff.

== Personal life ==
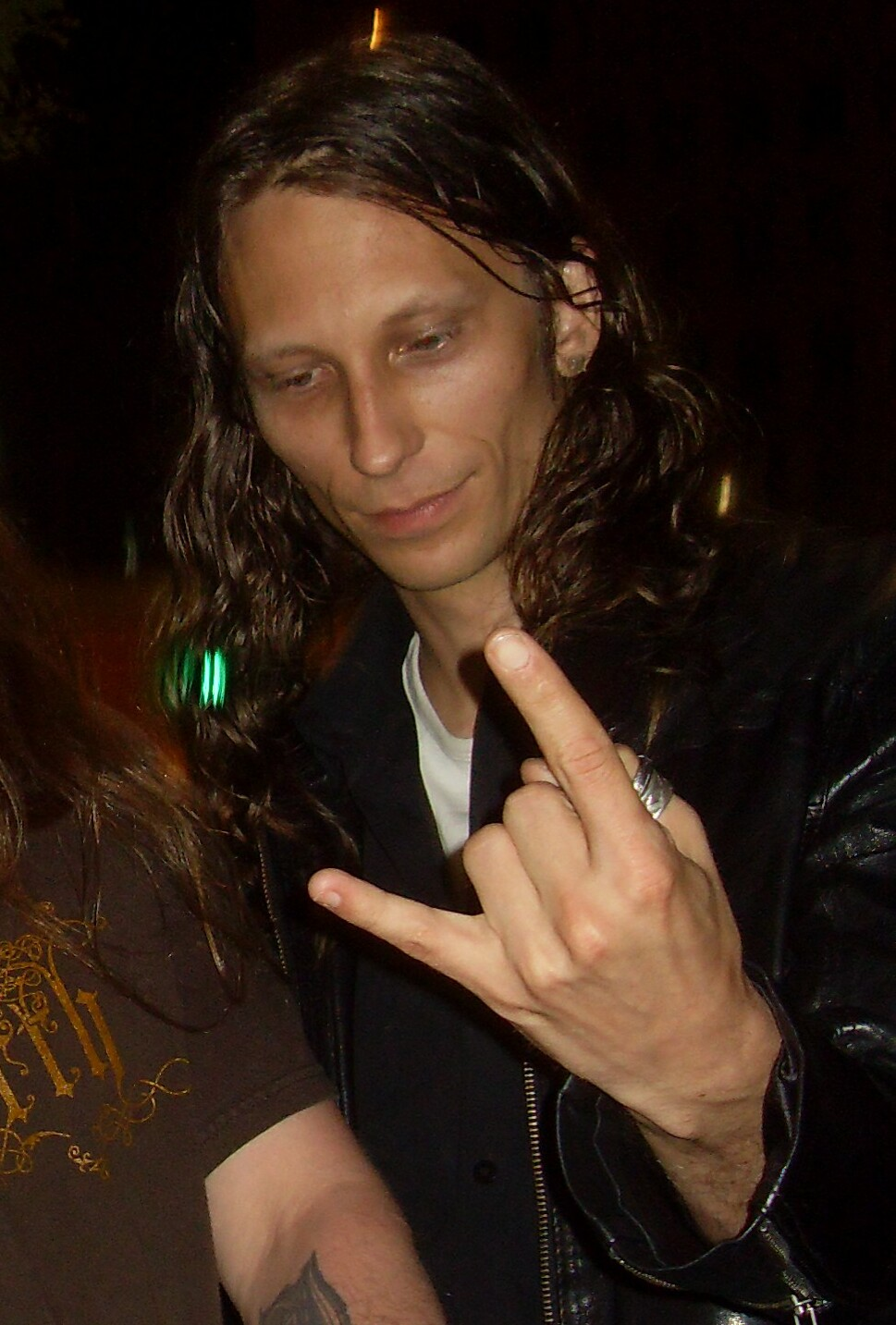
Larsen in 2009

Larsen has been in a relationship with journalist Øyvor Bakke since 2004. He is a fan of David Lynch and particularly the TV series Twin Peaks, which he considers to be "the toughest series in history."

== Discography ==
=== With Enslaved ===
Studio albums

- Isa (2004)
- Ruun (2006)
- Vertebrae (2008)
- Axioma Ethica Odini (2010)
- RIITIIR (2012)
- In Times (2015)

==== Live albums ====
- Roadburn Live (2017)

==== Studio EPs ====
- The Sleeping Gods (2011)
- Thorn (2011)

=== With Audrey Horne ===
==== Studio albums ====
- No Hay Banda (2005)

==== Studio EPs ====
- Confessions & Alcohol (2005)

=== Production and writing credits ===
Year	Artist	Title	Song(s)	Notes
1999	Aeternus	Shadows Of Old		Engineer, mixer
2000	Gaahlskagg	Erotic Funeral	"Lek No Lit(t) M.O.K.", "Whipper", "Moralens Hammer", "Come To My Kingdom", "Mankind - Development", "Helveteslokk - Kom Brenne"	Writer, producer, mixer
2000	Aeternus	Burning The Shroud		Producer, mixer
2000	Gorgoroth	Incipit Satan		Editor, mixer, mastering
2001	Mörk Gryning	Maelstrom Chaos		Engineer
2001	Enslaved	Monumension		Engineer
2001	Aeternus	Ascension Of Terror		Engineer
2002	Taake	Over Bjoergvin graater himmerik		Engineer
2002	El Regn	Stein Igjen		Engineer (additional)
2002	Amok	Lava Dictatorship		Mixer
2003	Enslaved	Below The Lights		Engineer
2003	Gorgoroth	Twilight Of The Idols (In Conspiracy With Satan)	"Of Ice and Movement..."	Composer (outro)
2003	Gorgoroth	Twilight Of The Idols (In Conspiracy With Satan)	All tracks	Engineer
2003	Amok / Audiopain	Lava Dictatorship / Revel In Desecration		Mixer
2005	Octavia Sperati	Winter Enclosure		Recording engineer, mixer
2005	Manngard	Circling Buzzards		Engineer
2006	Gorgoroth	Ad Majorem Sathanas Gloriam		Engineer, mixer
2006	I	Between Two Worlds		Engineer
2006	Black Hole Generator	Black Karma		Engineer
2006	Zimmerman	Till You Know What I Mean		Engineer (additional)
2006	Icon Eight	Thrash The Moment		Mastering
2007	Amok	Execution Compilation		Mixer
2007	Audrey Horne	Le Fol		Co-producer, mixer
2007	Syrach	Days Of Wrath		Producer, mixer
2007	Malsain	The Disease		Recording engineer, mixer
2007	Octavia Sperati	Grace Submerged	All tracks except "Don't Believe A Word"	Producer, recording engineer
2007	Octavia Sperati	Grace Submerged	All tracks	Mixer
2007	Vulture Industries	The Dystopia Journals		Engineer
2008	Audrey Horne	Shockadelica: 50th Anniversary Tribute To The Artist Known As Prince	"The Cross"	Mixer
2008	Gravdal	Sadist		Mixer, mastering
2009	Wardruna	Runaljod – Gap Var Ginnunga		Mixer
2009	Big Robot and Conrad Schnitzler	Aquafit		Mastering
2010	Ov Hell	The Underworld Regime		Engineer, mixer
2010	Gravdal	Torturmantra		Producer, recording engineer, mixer
2010	Sahg	III		Producer, engineer, mixer
2010	Nordagust	In The Mist Of Morning		Mastering
2010	Audrey Horne	Audrey Horne		Producer, recording engineer
2010	Byfrost	Black Earth		Producer
2010	Helheim	Åsgards Fall		Mastering
2010	The Batallion	Head Up High		Mastering
2011	Taake	Kveld		Mastering
2011	The Gathering	–	"Heroes For Ghosts"	Engineer (vocals)
2011	Helheim	Heiðindómr Ok Mótgangr		Mastering
2011	Byfrost	Of Death		Producer
2011	Taake	Noregs Vaapen		Mastering
2011	Demonaz	March Of The Norse		Producer
2012	Tortorum	Extinctionist		Mastering
2012	God Seed	Live At Wacken		Mixer
2012	The Gathering	Disclosure		Engineer
2012	Blodhemn	Holmengraa		Mastering
2012	Orkan	Crimson Canvas		Mastering
2012	Deride	The Void		Mastering
2013	Audrey Horne	Youngblood	"This Ends Here" (Demo), "The Open Sea" (Demo), "Show & Tell" (Demo)	Mixer
2013	Wardruna	Runaljod – Yggdrasil		Mixer (additional)
2013	Aeternus	...And The Seventh His Soul Detesteth		Mastering
2013	Bliksem	Face The Evil		Mastering
2013	Vulture Industries	The Tower	All tracks	Mixer
2013	Vulture Industries	The Tower	"Blood Don't Eliogabalus"	Mastering
2013	Fatal Fusion	The Ancient Tale		Mastering
2014	Übertøs	We Do Eat Lions		Mastering
2014	Taake	Kulde		Mastering
2014	Taake	Stridens Hus		Mastering
2015	Audrey Horne	Sannhet På Boks - En Hyllest Til Raga Rockers	"Drept Kjendis"	Producer, mixer
2016	El Caco	7		Recording engineer, mixer
2016	Sulphur	Omens Of Doom		Mastering
2016	Tortorum	Rotten. Dead. Forgotten.		Mastering
2016	Lik	Kjetteri		Producer, mixer
2016	Fatal Fusion	Total Absence		Mastering
2017	Gravdal	Kadaverin		Mastering
2017	Taake	Baktanker		Mastering
2017	Taake	Kong Vinter		Mastering
2018	Audrey Horne	Blackout	"Audrevolution", "The End"	Mixer
2018	Dewfall	Hermeticus		Producer, mastering
2018	Slegest	Introvert		Mixer
2018	RÁN	–	"Blodbylgje"	Recording engineer (vocals)
2019	Inculter	Fatal Visions		Mastering
2019	Lindy-Fay Hella	Seafarer		Writer, producer
2020	Audrey Horne	Waiting For The Night		Producer, mixer
2020	Whoredom Rife / Taake	Pakt		Mastering
2021	Taake / Helheim	Henholdsvis		Mastering
2021	Code	Flyblown Prince		Mastering
2021	Taake	Avvik		Mastering
2021	Drott	Orcus		Mixer
2021	Helheim	WoduridaR		Mastering
2022	Båååv	Rekyyl		Mixer
2022	Audrey Horne	Devil's Bell		Mixer
2022	The Gathering	Beautiful Distortion		Producer (pre-production vocals)
2022	Soft Ffog	Soft Ffog		Mastering
2022	Galdorcræft	Draugar		Mastering
2022	Michelle Ullestad	SOL / DVLM		Mastering
2023	Ljungblut	Sauda		Mastering
2023	66Crusher	Limbo		Recording engineer (drums)
2023	Immortal	War Against All		Recording engineer, mixer
2023	Drott	Troll		Mixer, mastering
2023	Aeternus	Philosopher		Producer, recording engineer, mixer
2023	Taake	Et hav av avstand		Mastering
2024	Hjerteslag	Betonglandskap		Producer
2025	Hjerteslag	Aldri Dra Herifra Vadmyra		Composer, Lyricist, Producer

=== Instrumental and vocal contributions ===
Year	Artist	Title	Song(s)	Instrument
2000	Gaahlskagg	Erotic Funeral		Electronics
2000	Gorgoroth	Incipit Satan	"A World To Win"	Synthesizer
2007	Audrey Horne	Le Fol		Organ, mellotron, keyboards
2007	Malsain	The Disease	"Intruder"	Additional keyboards
2007	Octavia Sperati	Grace Submerged	"Dead End Poem"	Acoustic guitar
2008	Audrey Horne	Shockadelica: 50th Anniversary Tribute To The Artist Known As Prince	"The Cross"	
2008	Gravdal	Sadist	"Sadist", "Lidelse"	Keyboards
2010	Ov Hell	The Underworld Regime		Keyboards, samples, effects
2010	Gravdal	Torturmantra	"Mishandlet", "Klastrert På Ambolt"	Mellotron
2010	Sahg	III		Organ, keyboards, backing vocals
2010	Audrey Horne	Audrey Horne		Keyboards
2010	Vulture Industries	The Malefactor's Bloody Register	"Race For The Gallows", "The Hangman's Hatch"	Organ
2011	Byfrost	Of Death	"Sorgh", "All Gods Are Gone"	Synthesizer, effects
2012	Ahab	The Giant	"Antarctica (The Polymorphess)", "The Giant"	Guest vocals
2012	God Seed	I Begin	"Hinstu Dagar"	Additional vocals
2013	Vulture Industries	The Tower		Additional keyboards, vocals
2015	Audrey Horne	Sannhet På Boks - En Hyllest Til Raga Rockers	"Drept Kjendis"	Backing vocals
2016	Abbath	Abbath	"Ocean of Wounds"	Keyboards, sampler
2018	Audrey Horne	Blackout	"Audrevolution", "The End"	Piano
2018	Slegest	Introvert	"Maler Lys I Mørketid", "Dødskyss"	Keyboards
2019	Lindy-Fay Hella	Seafarer		
2020	Audrey Horne	Waiting For The Night		Keyboards, backing vocals
2022	Hjerteslag	Tyvens dagbok		Synthesizer
2023	Drott	Troll	"Nattas Blot"	Vocals
2024	Hjerteslag	Betonglandskap		Keyboards, guitars
