= Olav Iversen =

Norwegian musician (born 1977)

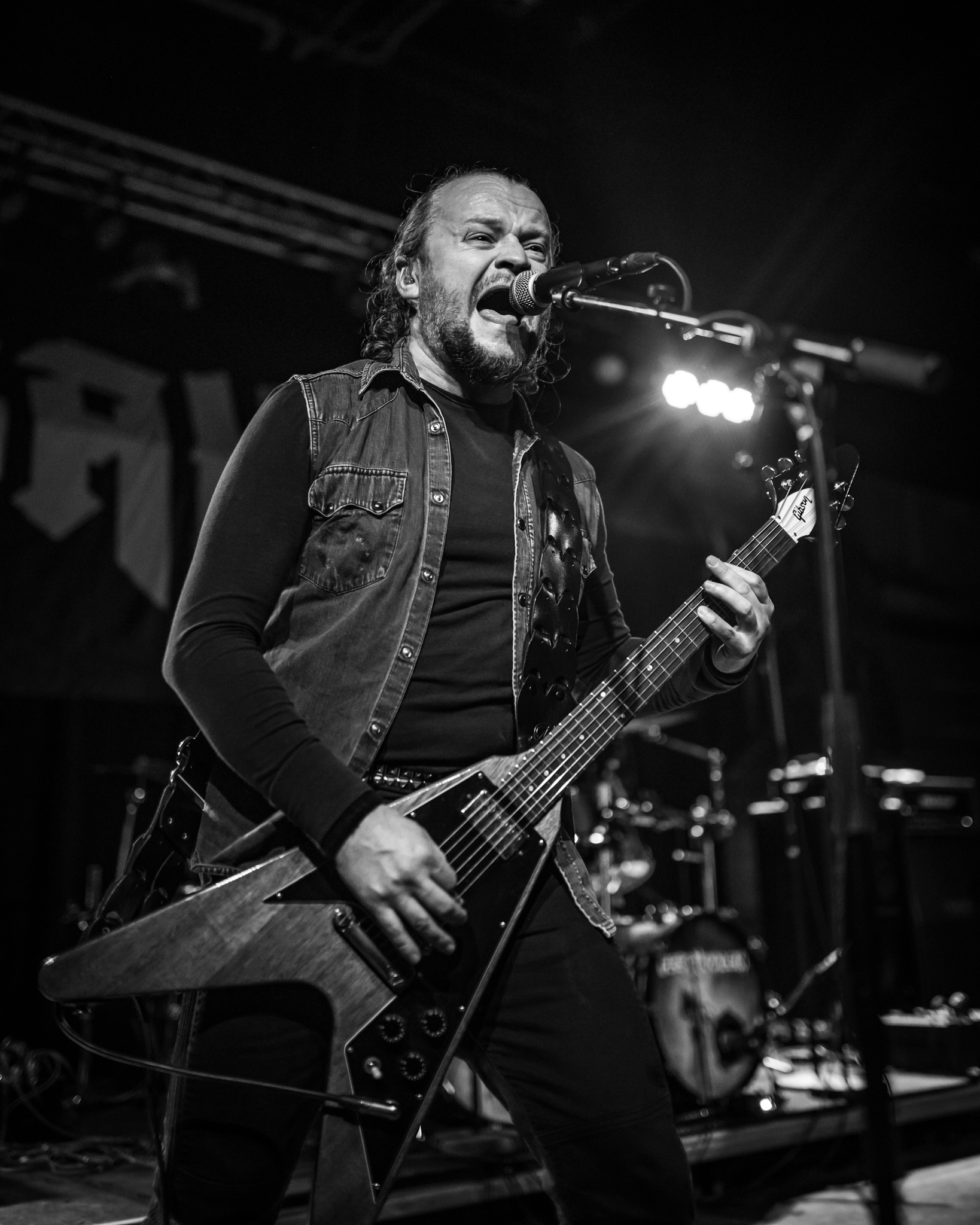
- Olav Iversen with Sahg, Norway 2024

Background information
- Born: 23 September 1977 (age 48)
- Origin: Sandøy Municipality, Møre og Romsdal, Norway
- Genres: Heavy metal, hard rock
- Occupations: Vocalist, guitarist, songwriter, graphic designer
- Instruments: Vocals, guitar
- Years active: 2001–present
- Labels: Regain, Indie
- Website: https://www.sahgband.com/

Olav Iversen (born 23 September 1977 in Sandøy Municipality, Møre og Romsdal) is a Norwegian heavy metal singer-songwriter and musician. He is better known as a founding member and the guitarist, lead vocalist, and primary songwriter of the rock band Sahg, as well as its only constant member.

== Musical career ==
Iversen's remarkable career began with Trucks, a British/Norwegian pop punk band, whose most popular release was the 2002 novelty single, "It's Just Porn Mum". The single was a Top 5 hit in Norway, and peaked at No. 35 in the UK Singles Chart.

He's best known for being the only constant member and co-founder of the hard rock band Sahg in 2004, along with Tom Cato Visnes (King ov Hell), Einar Selvik (Kvitrafn) and Thomas Tofthagen.

Iversen has also been an active member in several bands in his country, as Audrey Horne and Manngard.

Apart from his musical projects, he has also worked as an art director and graphic designer in Bergen since 2000.

== Discography ==
=== With Starling ===
- Mellowcold (EP, 2001)

=== With Trucks ===
- Juice (2003)

=== With Manngard ===
- Circling Buzzards (2006)
- European Cowards (2007)

=== With Sahg ===
- Sahg I (2006)
- Sahg II (2008)
- Sahg III (2010)
- Delusions Of Grandeur (2013)
- Memento Mori (2016)
- Born Demon (2022)

=== As guest musician ===
==== With Audrey Horne ====
- Le Fol (2007)

==== With Vulture Industries ====
- The Malefactor's Bloody Register (2010)

==== With Dominanz ====
- Noxious (2014)

==== With Ahab ====
- The Boats of the "Glen Carrig" (2015)
