= Audrey Horne (album) =

Studio album by Audrey Horne
- Released: 2010
- Recorded: 2010
- Studio: JHOC, Pasadena; Earshot & Conclave Studios, Bergen
- Genre: Hard rock, post-grunge, indie
- Length: 50:08
- Label: Indie Recordings
- Producer: Joe Barresi

Audrey Horne chronology
Le Fol (2007)	Audrey Horne (2010)	Youngblood (2013)

Professional ratings
Review scores
Source	Rating
Cutting Edge	4/5 stars
Laut.de	4/5 stars
Rock Hard	9/10
Rumba	4/5 stars
VG	5/6
Visions	7/12

Audrey Horne is the third album by Norwegian rock band Audrey Horne, released in 2010. The album was produced by Joe Barresi, who produced the band's debut album No Hay Banda. In addition to the standard edition of the album, a special limited edition was released containing a bonus disc of acoustic recordings.

== Track listing ==
All tracks are written by Audrey Horne, except where noted.

No.	Title	Length
1.	"These Vultures"	1:46
2.	"Charon"	4:26
3.	"Circus"	3:33
4.	"Down Like Suicide"	3:55
5.	"Blaze of Ashes"	4:44
6.	"Sail Away"	5:41
7.	"Bridges and Anchors"	4:36
8.	"Pitch Black Mourning"	6:15
9.	"Firehose"	6:06
10.	"Darkdrive"	5:32
11.	"Godspeed"	3:34
Total length:		50:08

Limited edition bonus disc
No.	Title	Writer(s)	Length
1.	"Desert Song"		3:08
2.	"Carrie"		3:58
3.	"Bright Lights"		3:42
4.	"Nowhere to Run"	Paul Stanley	4:33
5.	"Rearview Mirror"		4:02
6.	"Halo"	Ryan Tedder, Evan Bogart, Beyoncé Knowles	3:42

== Personnel ==
=== Audrey Horne ===
- Toschie – vocals
- Ice Dale (Arve Isdal) – guitars
- Thomas Tofthagen – guitars
- Kjetil Greve – drums

=== Additional Personnel ===
- Espen Lien – bass
- Herbrand Larsen – keyboards & percussion
- Heidi Marie Vestrheim – vocals
- Mike Fasano – drum-tech and lamp on "Down Like Suicide"

=== Production ===
- Produced, recorded and mixed by Joe Barresi at JHOC, Pasadena, Ca.
- Additional production and recording by Herbrand Larsen and Ice Dale at Earshot & Conclave Studios, Bergen, Norway

== Charts ==
Chart (2010)	Peak position
Norwegian Albums (VG-lista)	13
