= Delusions of Grandeur (Sahg album) =

Studio album by Sahg
- Released: October 25, 2013
- Recorded: Earshot Studio, Grieghallen Studio and Mackverk Studio, Bergen, Norway. 2013
- Genres: Doom metal, stoner rock, psychedelic rock, space rock
- Length: 46:39
- Label: Indie
- Producer: Iver Sandøy

Sahg chronology
III (2010)	Delusions of Grandeur (2013)	Memento Mori (2016)

Singles from Delusions of Grandeur
- 1. "Firechild" Released: April 26, 2013; 2. "Slip Off the Edge of the Universe" Released: September 19, 2013

Delusions of Grandeur is the fourth studio album by the Norwegian heavy metal band Sahg, released on October 25, 2013, under the Norwegian record label Indie Recordings.

== Background ==
It is the first concept album of the band, with the delusions of grandeur theme or megalomania.

Kvitrafn, original drummer of the band, collaborated in recording of "Walls Of Delusion". The album is the last with the original guitarist Thomas Tofthagen, who left Sahg in order to concentrate solely on his other band Audrey Horne in 2015.

An animated music video was made for "Slip off the Edge of the Universe", directed by Alexander Lillevik.

On February 12, 2014, Metal Blade Records premiered the song "Firechild" from the album in North America on the music blog lastrit.es, ahead of its official North American release on February 18, 2014.

== Musical style ==
Delusions of Grandeur marks a turning point towards a more experimental sound and a psychedelic stoner rock genre, radically different from the traditional heavy metal style of the previous three albums of the band.

The lyrics tells the tale of a man who slowly loses grasp of everything he has learned and experienced throughout his life and enters a vast imaginary state where he experiences increasingly severe delusions of grandeur.

== Cover art ==
The cover art (created by illustrator Robert Høyem) presents an imaginary astronaut on a psychedelic colorful background and geometric shapes. In this regard, Olav Iversen said in an interview:

It’s not a direct criticism of the space programs, it’s more a metaphor, like you say. But you can think about trying to explore and invade space if you like. You can look upon that as a delusion of grandeur as well. Before it happened, I guess a lot of people were thinking about it as delusions of grandeur: “No, it’s never gonna happen, they will never land on the Moon” and all that, but it happened. That space atmosphere is more a metaphor of the universe that this person we tell the story about ends up in because he kind of drifts off reality, and isolates himself into his own mental universe where he can become the most powerful creature.

== Track listing ==
All lyrics are written by Olav Iversen; all music is composed by Sahg, except where noted.

No.	Title	Writer(s)	Length
1.	"Slip Off The Edge Of The Universe"		5:54
2.	"Blizzardborne"		5:36
3.	"Firechild"		5:05
4.	"Walls Of Delusion"		6:27
5.	"Ether"	Iversen, Vetaas	5:09
6.	"Then Wakens The Beast"		4:42
7.	"Odium Delirium" (Instrumental)		2:33
8.	"Sleeper's Gate To The Galaxy"		11;38
Total length:			46:39

== Personnel ==
=== Sahg ===
- Olav Iversen - Vocals, guitars
- Tony Vetaas - Bass, vocals
- Thomas Tofthagen - Guitars
- Thomas Lønnheim - Drums, percussion

=== Guest/session musicians ===
- Einar "Kvitrafn" Selvik - Percussion, vocals (Track 4)
- Iver Sandøy - Vocals (additional), percussion, piano, moog, analog soundscapes

=== Production and engineering ===
- Iver Sandøy - Producer, mixing, mastering
- Robert Høyem - Design
- Jarle Hovda Moe - Photography
- Norway, Germany, Austria and Sweden release date: October 25, 2013.
- Rest of the world: October 28, 2013.
