= Winter Enclosure =

Studio album by Octavia Sperati
- Released: 14 June 2005
- Recorded: Earshot Studio, Bergen, Norway, 2003-2005
- Genre: Gothic metal, doom metal
- Length: 40:37
- Label: Candlelight Records
- Producer: Octavia Sperati, Herbrand Larsen

Octavia Sperati chronology
Guilty (2002)	Winter Enclosure (2005)	Grace Submerged (2007)

Winter Enclosure, the debut album by Norwegian gothic metal band Octavia Sperati, was released on 14 June 2005 on the Candlelight Records label.

The album was promoted with two music videos: "Lifelines of Depths" (a second version after the already known one in 2004) and "Hunting Eye", both made by the director Asle Birkeland.

== Track listing ==
No.	Title	Lyrics	Music	Length
1.	"Intro"	instrumental	Bodil	0:53
2.	"Lifelines of Depths"	Silje	Bodil	5:47
3.	"Soundless"	Silje	Trine	4:29
4.	"Icebound"	Silje	Bodil	3:36
5.	"Hymn"	Silje	Silje	0:44
6.	"Hunting Eye"	Silje	Silje	3:32
7.	"Future Is"	Silje	Bodil	5:00
8.	"Below Zero"	Silje	Gyri	5:25
9.	"Wasted on the Living"	Silje	Bodil	4:31
10.	"Without Air (Before)"	Gyri	Gyri	2:38
11.	"Without Air (After)"	Gyri	Gyri	5:28
Total length:				40:37

== Personnel ==
=== Octavia Sperati ===
- Silje Wergeland – vocals
- Bodil Myklebust – guitar
- Gyri S. Losnegaard – guitar
- Trine C. Johansen – bass
- Tone Midtgaard – keyboard
- Hege S. Larson – drums

=== Additional musicians ===
- Pytten (Eirik Hundvin) - grand piano
- Ivar Bjørnson - effects in track 11

=== Production and Engineering ===
- Produced, recorded, mixed By – Herbrand Larsen
- Engineer – Eirik "Pytten" Hundvin, Arve "Squanky" Isdal
- Layout – Adrian Wear
- Mastered By – Tim Turan
- Hair & Styling – Jeanette Myrvoll, Veronika Kindervåg
- Make Up – Tina Solberg Torstad
- Photography – Chris McFall
- Photography By [Front Image] – Evil Twin (10), Gregory J. Summers
- Recorded At – Earshot Studio
- Recorded At – Grieghallen Studio and Earshot Studio, Bergen
- Produced At – Earshot Studio
- Mastered At – Turan Audio
- Cover image: Sunshine on a Cloudy Day ©2000 by Gregory J. Summers.
