= Pure Heavy =

Studio album by Audrey Horne
- Released: 2014
- Studio: Duper Studio; Solslottet Studio
- Genre: Hard rock
- Length: 50:09
- Label: Napalm Records
- Producer: Jørgen Træen & Iver Sandøy

Audrey Horne chronology
Youngblood (2013)	Pure Heavy (2014)	Blackout (2018)

Professional ratings
Review scores
Source	Rating
Classic Rock	4/5 stars
Dagbladet	5/5 stars
Gaffa Norway	4/6
Metal Hammer UK	4/5 stars
Metal Hammer Germany	5/7
OA	4/5 stars
Plattentests.de	7/10
Powermetal.de	6.5/10
Rock Hard	7.5/10

Pure Heavy is the fifth album by Norwegian rock band Audrey Horne, released in 2014. Produced by Jørgen Træen and Iver Sandøy, the album continued the double lead guitar harmony sound that the band adapted in their previous effort, Youngblood.

== Track listing ==
All tracks are written by Audrey Horne.

No.	Title	Length
1.	"Wolf in My Heart"	3:58
2.	"Holy Roller"	4:09
3.	"Out of the City"	3:32
4.	"Volcano Girl"	3:32
5.	"Tales from the Crypt"	3:19
6.	"Diamond"	1:30
7.	"Into the Wild"	3:40
8.	"Gravity"	4:25
9.	"High & Dry"	4:20
10.	"Waiting for the Night"	4:05
11.	"Boy Wonder"	5:50

Bonus tracks
No.	Title	Length
12.	"Let Live"	4:12
13.	"Between the Devil and the Deep Blue Sea"	3:37
Total length:		50:09

== Personnel ==
=== Audrey Horne ===
- Toschie – vocals
- Ice Dale (Arve Isdal) – guitars
- Thomas Tofthagen – guitars
- Kjetil Greve – drums
- Espen Lien – bass

=== Additional Personnel ===
- Jørgen Træen – keyboards, additional guitars
- Iver Sandøy – percussion, backing vocals, additional guitars

=== Production ===
- Produced and engineered by Jørgen Træen and Iver Sandøy in Duper Studio and Solslottet Studio
- Mixed by Jørgen Træen in Duper Studio
- Mastered by Iver Sandøy, Solslottet Studio

== Charts ==
Chart (2015)	Peak position
German Albums (Offizielle Top 100)	90
