= Thomas Tofthagen =

Norwegian guitarist (born 1973)

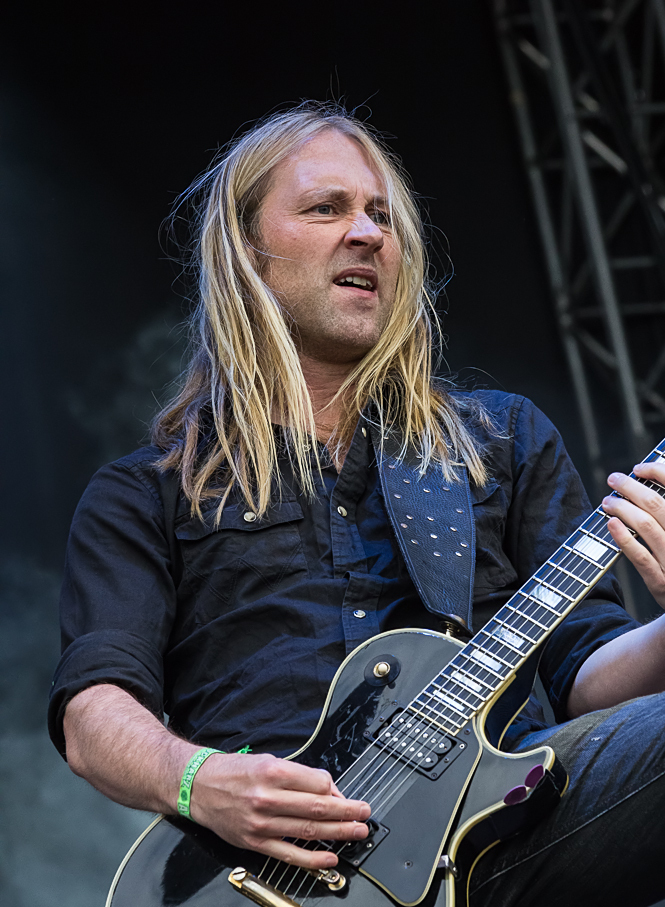
- Tofthagen performing live with Audrey Horne in 2013

Background information
- Born: 10 December 1973 (age 51)
- Origin: Rykkinn, Akershus, Norway
- Genres: Heavy metal; hard rock; doom metal
- Occupations: Musician; songwriter; architect
- Instruments: Guitar; vocals
- Years active: 2002–present
- Labels: Regain; Indie
- Member of: Audrey Horne
- Formerly of: Sahg

Thomas Odd Tofthagen (born 10 December 1973 in Rykkinn, Akershus, Norway) is a Norwegian guitarist, best known for his work in rock bands Audrey Horne and Sahg. He is one of the main songwriters in Audrey Horne and has released seven studio albums with the band, in addition to winning a Norwegian Spellemann Award. Apart from his work in music, Tofthagen works full-time as an architect.

== Career ==
Tofthagen started his international musical career in 2002 as a live guitarist for former Iron Maiden vocalist Paul Di'Anno, along with future-Audrey Horne bandmates Arve Isdal and Espen Lien. With Di'Anno, he recorded the live video album The Beast in the East in 2003.

In 2002, Tofthagen founded Audrey Horne together with bassist Tom Cato Visnes and drummer Kjetil Greve, with singer Torkjell "Toschie" Rød, guitarist Isdal and keyboardist Herbrand Larsen completing the lineup. The band released their debut album, No Hay Banda, in 2005 and won the Norwegian Spellemann Award in the Metal category that same year. Audrey Horne has since their debut album released six additional studio albums and one live album.

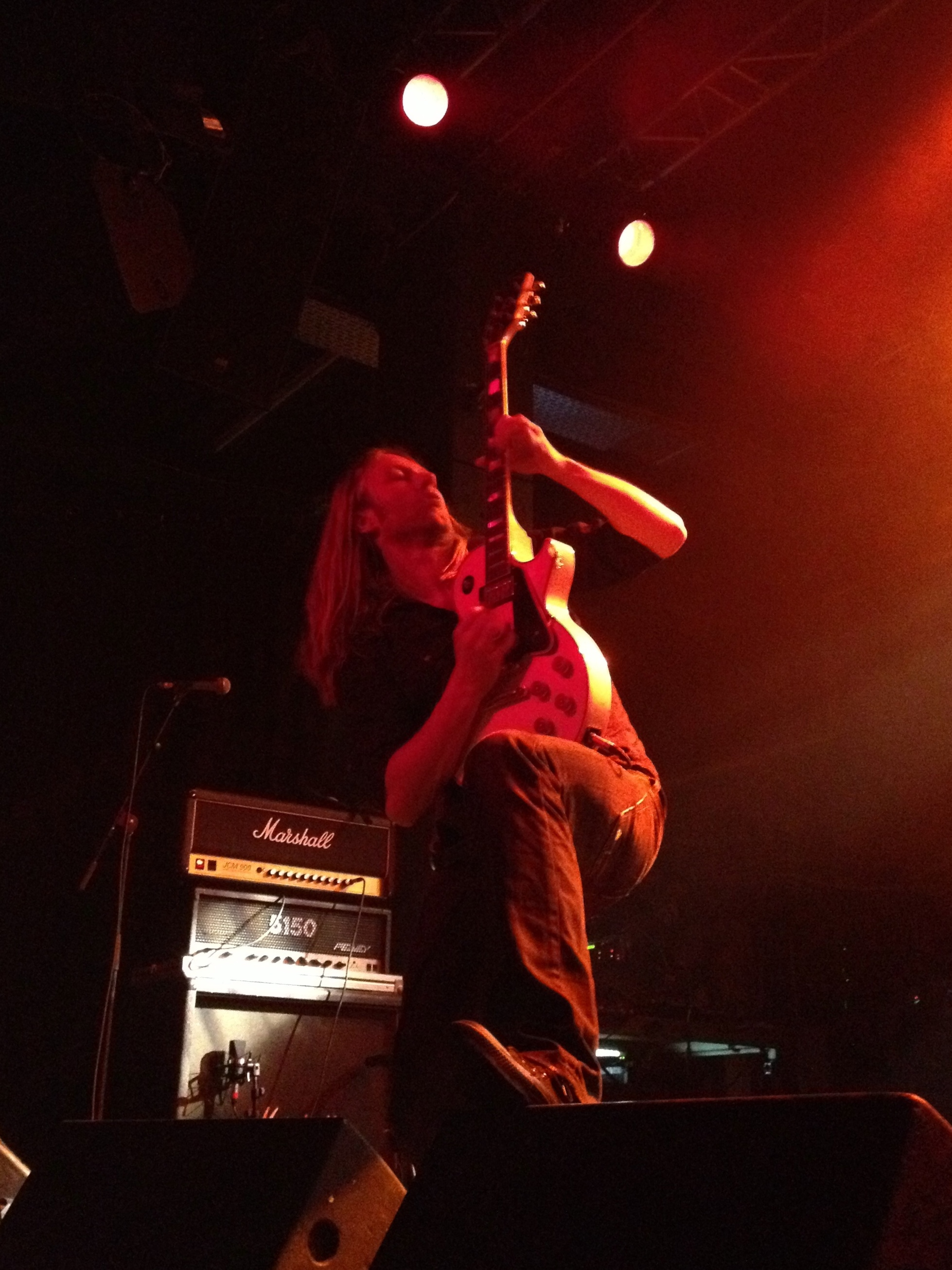
Tofthagen with Sagh in 2013.

In addition to Audrey Horne, Tofthagen was a founding member of the hard rock/doom metal band Sahg and played with the band from 2004 and 2015. He released four studio albums with Sahg until his amicable departure.

== Discography ==
=== Audrey Horne ===
==== Studio albums ====
- No Hay Banda (2005)
- Le Fol (2007)
- Audrey Horne (2010)
- Youngblood (2013)
- Pure Heavy (2014)
- Blackout (2018)
- Devil's Bell (2022)

==== Live albums ====
- Waiting For The Night (2020)

==== Studio EPs ====
- Confessions & Alcohol (2005)

=== Sahg ===
==== Studio albums ====
- I (2006)
- II (2008)
- III (2010)
- Delusions of Grandeur (2013)

==== Studio EPs ====
- Godless (2005)
