= Memento Mori (Sahg album) =

Studio album by Sahg
- Released: September 23rd, 2016
- Recorded: Duper Studio and Solslottet Studio, Bergen, Norway. 2016
- Genre: Doom metal, stoner rock, psychedelic rock, space rock
- Length: 44:31
- Label: Indie
- Producer: Iver Sandøy

Sahg chronology
Delusions of Grandeur (2013)	Memento Mori (2016)	Born Demon (2022)

Singles from Memento Mori
- 1. "Sanctimony" Released: June 28, 2016; 2. "Silence the Machines" Released: August 12, 2016; 3. "Black Unicorn" Released: September 14, 2016; 4. "Blood of Oceans" Released: November 12, 2016

Memento Mori is the fifth studio album by the Norwegian heavy metal band Sahg, released on September 23, 2016 under Indie Recordings. The album features two new band members: drummer Mads Lilletvedt (ex- Hellish Outcast) and guitarist Ole Walaunet (a.k.a. Lust Kilman from Gaahls Wyrd).

A music video was made for "Black Unicorn" (third single of the album), directed by Benjamin Langeland from Flimmer Film AS.

== Background ==
The album release date coincides with the 39th birthday of Olav Iversen (Sahg frontman), an aspect that's symbolic to the title. Iversen explains:

Memento Mori was one of several options that we had on note for a long time. But then Lemmy (Kilmister) died. And (David) Bowie died. And all of a sudden, all these rock icons disappeared, one by one. People that have made their imprint on history and influenced us musically since childhood. It made a great impression on a personal level, and started a grieving process that influenced the making of the album. Suddenly it was very clear what the album title would be. “Remember, you must die”. Even immortal legends like Bowie and Lemmy don’t live forever.

== Track listing ==
All lyrics are written by Olav Iversen, except where noted; all music is composed by Sahg

No.	Title	Writer(s)	Length
1.	"Black Unicorn"		6:26
2.	"Devilspeed"	Iversen / Vetaas	3:55
3.	"Take It to the Grave"	Iversen / Walaunet	5:59
4.	"Silence the Machines"		4:48
5.	"Sanctimony"	Iversen / Walaunet	7:29
6.	"(Praise the) Electric Sun"		3:37
7.	"Travellers of Space and Light"		5:20
8.	"Blood of Oceans"	Iversen / Vetaas / Selvik	6:57
Total length:			44:31

== Personnel ==
=== Sahg ===
- Olav Iversen - Vocals, guitars
- Tony Vetaas - Bass, vocals
- Mads Lilletvedt - Drums
- Ole Walaunet - Guitars

=== Guest/session musicians ===
- Einar Selvik - Vocals (backing), Percussion (Additional) (Track 8)
- Iver Sandøy - Vocals (backing)
- Torbjørn Schei - Vocals (backing)

=== Production and engineering ===
- Robert Høyem - Cover art, design
- Iver Sandøy - Production
- Recorded at Duper Studio & Solslottet Studio.
- Mixed & mastered at Solslottet Studio.
