= March of the Norse =

Studio album by Demonaz
- Released: 1 April 2011 (EU), 17 May 2011 (US)
- Genre: Viking metal, black metal
- Length: 35:28
- Label: Nuclear Blast

Professional ratings
Review scores
Source	Rating
Thrash Hits	4.5/6 stars
Metal Review	(8.3/10)

March of the Norse is the debut studio album by Demonaz, released in 2011 through Nuclear Blast.

== Track listing ==
No.	Title	Length
1.	"Northern Hymn"	0:50
2.	"All Blackened Sky"	4:27
3.	"March of the Norse"	3:41
4.	"A Son of the Sword"	4:35
5.	"Where Gods Once Rode"	5:11
6.	"Under the Great Fires"	6:34
7.	"Over the Mountains"	5:07
8.	"Ode to Battle"	0:39
9.	"Legends of Fire and Ice"	4:24
Total length:		35:28

Digipack edition bonus track
No.	Title	Length
10.	"Dying Sun" (originally written in 1998)	4:03
Total length:		39:31

== Personnel ==
- Demonaz - vocals
- Ice Dale - guitars & bass
- Armagedda - drums
- Music and lyrics by Demonaz
- Recorded in Grieghallen and Conclave & Earshot Studios
- Produced by Ice Dale and Herbrand Larsen
- Additional mixing by Kristian Tvedt
- Mastered at Strype Audio by Tom Kvalsvoll
