= Blackout (Audrey Horne album) =

Studio album by Audrey Horne
- Released: 2018
- Recorded: 2018
- Genre: Hard rock
- Length: 51:14
- Label: Napalm Records
- Producer: Kato Adland

Audrey Horne chronology
Pure Heavy (2015)	Blackout (2018)	Waiting for the Night (2020)

Professional ratings
Review scores
Source	Rating
Classic Rock UK	3/5 stars
Classic Rock Germany	9/10
Keskisuomalainen	5/5 stars
Metal Hammer Germany	6/7
Metal Hammer UK	3/5 stars
Plattentests.de	8/10
Powermetal.de	9.5/10
Rock Hard	9/10
Visions	6/10

Blackout is the sixth album by Norwegian rock band Audrey Horne, released in 2018.

== Track listing ==
All tracks are written by Audrey Horne.

No.	Title	Length
1.	"This Is War"	6:15
2.	"Audrevolution"	3:16
3.	"Blackout"	4:15
4.	"This One"	4:34
5.	"Midnight Man"	3:44
6.	"Light Your Way"	3:55
7.	"California"	4:10
8.	"Satellite"	4:07
9.	"Naysayer"	3:56
10.	"Rose Alley"	3:59

Bonus tracks
No.	Title	Length
11.	"Juggernaut"	4:07
12.	"The End"	4:56
Total length:		51:14

== Personnel ==
=== Audrey Horne ===
- Toschie – vocals
- Ice Dale (Arve Isdal) – guitars
- Thomas Tofthagen – guitars
- Kjetil Greve – drums
- Espen Lien – bass

=== Additional personnel ===
- Kato Adland – "Janick Gers" guitar on "This Is War", background vocals, keyboards
- Ove Gaassand – Hammond organ on "This Is War", "This One", "Light Your Way" and "California"
- Matias Monsen – cello on "This Is War" and "The End"
- Silje Wergeland – backing vocals on "This Is War" and "Audrevolution"
- Lindy-Fay Hella – backing vocals on "This Is War"
- Herbrand Larsen – piano on "Audrevolution" and "The End"

=== Production ===
- Produced by Kato Adland
- Mixed by Kato Adland and Iver Sandøy
- "Audrevolution" mixed by Herbrand Larsen
- Mastered by Iver Sandøy at Solslottet Studio

== Charts ==
Chart (2018)	Peak position
Austrian Albums (Ö3 Austria)	68
Belgian Albums (Ultratop Flanders)	170
German Albums (Offizielle Top 100)	37
Swiss Albums (Schweizer Hitparade)	46
