= Grace Submerged =

Studio album by Octavia Sperati
- Released: 21 May 2007
- Recorded: 2006/2007
- Genre: Gothic metal, doom metal
- Length: 37:51
- Label: Candlelight Records
- Producer: Herbrand Larsen

Octavia Sperati chronology
Winter Enclosure (2005)	Grace Submerged (2007)

Grace Submerged, the second and final album by Norwegian doom/gothic metal band Octavia Sperati, was released in May 2007 via Candlelight Records.

== Background ==
Grace Submerged was produced by Herbrand Larsen, former keyboardist of extreme metal band Enslaved. Ivar Bjørnson of the same band made an appearance on the album, co-writing "Dead End Poem".

The album features an interpretation of the Phil Lynott-penned "Don't Believe A Word", which Terrorizer Magazine called "a chilling ballad". Krister Dreyer ("Morfeus") plays the piano and keyboards in that song and the samples in "Submerged".

The song "Moonlit" was released as a music video.

== Track listing ==
No.	Title	Lyrics	Music	Length
1.	"Guilty Am I"	S. Wergeland	G. Losnegaard	4:31
2.	"Moonlit"	S. Wergeland	G. Losnegaard	5:06
3.	"Going North"	S. Wergeland	T.C. Johansen	4:00
4.	"Don't Believe A Word" (Thin Lizzy cover)	P. Lynott	P. Lynott	3:07
5.	"...And The World Froze"	S. Wergeland	B. Myklebust	4:14
6.	"The Final Rest"	S. Wergeland	B. Myklebust	3:25
7.	"Deprivation"	S. Wergeland	T.C. Johansen	4:15
8.	"Provenance Of Hate"	S. Wergeland	G. Losnegaard	3:45
9.	"Dead End Poem"	I. Bjørnson	H. Larsen, S. Wergeland	3:34
10.	"Submerged"	Instrumental	Morfeus, T. Midtgaard	1:54
Total length:				37:51

== Personnel ==
=== Octavia Sperati ===
- Silje Wergeland – vocals
- Bodil Myklebust – guitar
- Gyri S. Losnegaard – guitar
- Trine C. Johansen – bass
- Tone Midtgaard – keyboard
- Ivar Alver – drums

=== Additional musicians ===
- Morfeus (Krister Dreyer) - keyboards, piano & samplings in tracks 4 & 10

=== Production and Engineering ===
- Produced, engineered and mixed by Herbrand Larsen
- Co-engineer – Arve "Ice Dale" Isdal
- Mastered By – Jaimee Gomez
- Artwork By [Cover Art & Layout] – Richard Lock
- Photography [Band Photos] – Tommy Næss
- Recorded and produced in Earshot Studio, Bergen November/December 2006.
- Track 4 and keyboards, piano and samplings on all tracks recorded in MOF Studio in Sandefjord.
- Guitar on track 6 recorded in Earshot Studio.
- Mixed at Lydriket/Your Favourite Music.
