= Trucks (band) =

Band

- Origin: Norway / United Kingdom
- Genres: Pop punk, punk rock, alternative rock
- Years active: 2002–2004
- Label: Waterfall
- Members: Olav Iversen; Mark Remmington; Tor Bjarne Bjelland; Steve Ryan

Trucks were a short-lived British/Norwegian pop punk band, whose most popular release was the 2002 novelty single, "It's Just Porn Mum". The single was a top-five hit in Norway, and peaked at No. 35 on the UK Singles Chart.

== Members ==
- Olav Iversen – vocals, guitar
- Mark Remmington – guitar
- Tor Bjarne Bjelland – drums
- Steve Ryan – bass

== Discography ==
=== Albums ===
- Juice – released 26 May 2003
1. "Kickin'" (Shridhar Solanki, HP Aaserud, Geir Luedy, Trucks)
2. "The Village Bike" (Shridhar Solanki, HP Aaserud, Geir Luedy, Trucks)
3. "Monkey See, Monkey Do" (Shridhar Solanki, Sidh Solanki, Trucks)
4. "Easy" (HP Aaserud, Geir Luedy, Trucks)
5. "Lovin' the Laughter" (Shridhar Solanki, HP Aaserud, Geir Luedy, Trucks)
6. "Fuzz About It" (HP Aaserud, Geir Luedy, Trucks)
7. "Sad Song" (Shridhar Solanki, HP Aaserud)
8. "Psychos" (Shridhar Solanki, HP Aaserud, Trucks)
9. "It's Just Porn Mum" "(Shridhar Solanki, HP Aaserud)
10. "The Chasers" (Shridhar Solanki, HP Aaserud, Geir Luedy, Trucks)
11. "I'm Okay" (Shridhar Solanki, HP Aaserud, Trucks)
12. "Coming Over" (HP Aaserud, Geir Luedy, Trucks)

Many promo versions of the album were released, including songs not to be featured on the main album itself, such as a cover version of The Tom Robinson Band's hit, "2-4-6-8 Motorway".

=== Singles ===
List of singles, with selected chart positions
Title	Year	Peak chart positions				Album
Title	Year	NOR	AUS	DEN	UK	Album
"It's Just Porn Mum"	2002	5	46	13	35	Juice
"Kickin'"	2003	11	—	—	—	Juice
"Monkey See, Monkey Do"	2004	—	—	—	—	Juice
