= I (Sahg album) =

Studio album by Sahg
- Released: March 1st, 2006
- Recorded: Earshot Studio, Bergen, Norway, 2005
- Genre: Heavy metal, doom metal
- Length: 48:23
- Label: Regain
- Producer: Brynjulv Guddal

Sahg chronology
I (2006)	II (2008)

Professional ratings
Review scores
Source	Rating
Allmusic	4/5 stars

I (also called Sahg I or Sahg 1 ) is the debut album by the Norwegian doom metal band Sahg, released on March 1, 2006, under the Swedish record label Regain Records.

The artwork for the album was created single-handedly by the band members, and the video for "Godless Faith" was shot in October the same year, and was directed by Tommy Naess.

Sahg I entered the Norwegian charts at no. 31, and garnered some rave reviews across Europe.

== Track listing ==
No.	Title	Lyrics	Music	Length
1.	"Intro: Parade Macabre"	Instrumental	King	2:01
2.	"Repent"	Iversen	Tofthagen	7:26
3.	"The Executioner Undead"	Iversen	King, Iversen, Tofthagen, Kvitrafn	4:34
4.	"The Alchemist"	Iversen	Tofthagen	5:02
5.	"Rivers Running Dry"	Iversen	Iversen, King	5:19
6.	"Whisper Of Abaddon"	Iversen	Brynjulv Guddal	1:28
7.	"Godless Faith"	Iversen	Tofthagen	6:23
8.	"Soul Exile"	Iversen	Tofthagen	4:40
9.	"Boundless Demise"	Iversen	Tofthagen	4:36
10.	"Black Passage"	Iversen	Iversen	6:57
Total length:				48:23

== Personnel ==
=== Sahg ===
- Olav Iversen - Vocals, Guitar
- Thomas Tofthagen - Guitars
- King - Bass
- Kvitrafn - Drums, Throat-singing (Track 1)

=== Guest/session musicians ===
- Brynjulv Guddal - Percussion, Flute, Organ, Piano, Synthesizers

=== Production and engineering ===
- The Twin Axe Warriors - Art direction
- The Pre-Apocalyptic Sorcerer - Artwork
- Tommy Næss - Photography
- Hans Peter Klasson - Photography
- Brynjulv Guddal - Producer, Recording, Mixing
- Peter In de Betou – Mastering
- Recorded and mixed in Earshot Studio, Bergen, Norway
- Mastered at Tailormaid Productions
