= The Underworld Regime =

Studio album by Ov Hell
- Released: 8 February 2010
- Genre: Black metal
- Length: 37:35
- Label: Indie Recordings (Europe); Prosthetic Records (North America)
- Producer: Tom Cato Visnes

Professional ratings
Review scores
Source	Rating
About.com	2/5 stars
Terrorizer	5/10 stars
Metal Hammer	8/10 stars
PopMatters	5/10 stars
Rock Hard	4.5/10 stars
Rock Hard	8/10 stars

The Underworld Regime is the debut studio album by Ov Hell. It was released on 8 February 2010.

== Tracks ==
All music is composed by King.

No.	Title	Lyrics	Length
1.	"Devil's Harlot"	Shagrath	3:23
2.	"Post Modern Sadist"	Silenoz	4:56
3.	"Invoker"	King, Christian Anfinnsen	4:25
4.	"Perpetual Night"	Shagrath	3:36
5.	"Ghosting"	King, Sarah Owens	6:16
6.	"Acts of Sin"	Shagrath	5:19
7.	"Krigsatte Faner"	Shagrath	3:52
8.	"Hill Norge"	Shagrath	5:46
Total length:			37:35

== Personnel ==
Ov Hell

- Shagrath – lead vocals
- King ov Hell – bass, backing vocals

Additional personnel

- Ice Dale – guitar (1, 2, 5–8)
- Teloch – guitar (3–4)
- Frost – drums
- Herbrand Larsen – keyboard, samples, effects
- Trym Hartmark Visnes – keyboard, samples, effects
