= Le Fol =

Studio album by Audrey Horne
- Released: 2007
- Recorded: 2007
- Genre: Hard rock, post-grunge, indie
- Length: 52:25
- Label: Indie Recordings
- Producer: Ice Dale & Herbrand Larsen

Audrey Horne chronology
No Hay Banda (2005)	Le Fol (2007)	Audrey Horne (2010)

Professional ratings
Review scores
Source	Rating
ABC Nyheter	7/10
Adresseavisen	4/5 stars
BA	5/5 stars
Laut.de	4/5 stars
Rock Hard	8/10
Stavanger Aftenblad	5/5 stars
VG	5/6
Visions	6/12

Le Fol is the second album by Norwegian rock band Audrey Horne. Produced by the band's guitarist Ice Dale and former keyboardist Herbrand Larsen, it was released in 2007. The album received positive reviews from both Norwegian and international critics.

== Track listing ==
All lyrics are written by Toschie; all music is composed by Ice Dale, except where noted.

No.	Title	Music	Length
1.	"Last Chance for a Serenade"	Ice Dale, Thomas Tofthagen	4:28
2.	"Jaws"		3:14
3.	"Last Call"		3:33
4.	"Threshold"		5:05
5.	"Monster"		3:52
6.	"Afterglow"		3:56
7.	"In the End"	Tofthagen, Ice Dale	4:58
8.	"Pretty Girls Make Graves"	Tofthagen, Ice Dale	4:00
9.	"Bright Lights"		4:51
10.	"Hell Hath no Fury"		3:07
11.	"I Wish you Hell"		4:54
12.	"So Long, Euphoria"	Tofthagen	6:20
Total length:			52:25

== Personnel ==
=== Audrey Horne ===
- Toschie – vocals
- Ice Dale (Arve Isdal) – guitars & bass
- Thomas Tofthagen – guitars
- Kjetil Greve – drums

=== Additional Personnel ===
- Herbrand Larsen – keyboards, organ, Mellotron
- Olav Iversen – guest vocals on "Jaws" and "So Long, Euphoria"

=== Production ===
- Produced by Ice Dale & Herbrand Larsen
- Recorded, engineered & mixed by Herbrand Larsen
- Mastered by Håkan Åkesson at Cuttingroom, Sweden

== Charts ==
Chart (2007)	Peak position
Norwegian Albums (VG-lista)	22
