= II (Sahg album) =

Studio album by Sahg
- Released: March 18th, 2008
- Recorded: Earshot Studio, Bergen, Norway, 2007
- Genre: Heavy metal, doom metal
- Length: 48:38
- Label: Regain
- Producer: Brynjulv Guddal

Sahg chronology
I (2006)	II (2008)	III (2010)

Alternative cover

II (also called Sahg II) is the second studio album by the Norwegian hard rock band Sahg, released on March 18, 2008, under the Swedish record label Regain Records.

The album was recorded as a trio after the departure of original drummer Kvitrafn some months before. Instead, the producer Brynjulv Guddal was the session drummer. Similarly, it features several guest vocalists in "From Conscious Sleep".

A music video was made for "Pyromancer", directed by Asle Birkeland.

== Track listing ==
No.	Title	Lyrics	Music	Length
1.	"Ascent to Decadence"	Iversen	Iversen, Tofthagen	4:12
2.	"Echoes Ring Forever"	Iversen	Tofthagen	6:17
3.	"From Conscious Sleep"	Instrumental	Tofthagen	2:15
4.	"Star-Crossed"	Iversen	Tofthagen	6:25
5.	"Escape The Crimson Sun"	Iversen	Iversen, Tofthagen	4:54
6.	"Pyromancer"	Iversen	Iversen, Tofthagen	3:56
7.	"Wicked Temptress"	Iversen	Tofthagen	5:10
8.	"By The Toll Of The Bell"	Iversen	King	4:34
9.	"Monomania"	Iversen	Tofthagen	10:58
Total length:				48:38

== Personnel ==
=== Sahg ===
- Olav Iversen – Vocals, Guitars, Percussion, Mandola (Track 5)
- Thomas Tofthagen – Guitars
- King – Bass

=== Guest/session musicians ===
- Brynjulv Guddal – Drums, Percussion, Keyboards, Piano, Hammond organ
- Torkjell Rød, Per Vidar Staff, Marita Moe Sandven, Lindy-Fay Hella, Elise Heradstveit Schei – Vocals (choirs) (Track 3)

=== Production and engineering ===
- Martin Kvamme – Cover art
- Thor Brødreskift – Photography
- Brynjulv Guddal – Producer, Engineering
- Rob Caggiano – Mixing, Mastering
- Paul Orofino – Mixing, Mastering
- Mixed and mastered in Millbrook Sound Studio, Millbrook, New York
