= No Hay Banda =

Studio album by Audrey Horne
- Released: 2005
- Recorded: 2005
- Studio: Earshot Studio, Bergen
- Genre: Hard rock, post-grunge
- Length: 49:40
- Label: Tuba Records / DogJob
- Producer: Audrey Horne & Joe Barresi

Audrey Horne chronology
Confessions & Alcohol (2005)	No Hay Banda (2005)	Le Fol (2007)

Professional ratings
Review scores
Source	Rating
Adresseavisen	3/5 stars
AllMusic	3.5/5 stars
Panorama	5/6
Rock Hard	7.5/10
VG	3/6

No Hay Banda is the debut album by Norwegian rock band Audrey Horne, released in 2005. The album was produced by the band and Joe Barresi. No Hay Banda received good reviews from critics and won the band a Norwegian Spellemann Award in the Metal category in 2005. The album title translates to "There is no band" in Spanish, and was inspired by a line from the David Lynch film Mulholland Drive.

== Track listing ==
All tracks are written by Audrey Horne.

No.	Title	Length
1.	"Dead"	3:10
2.	"Listening"	3:45
3.	"Get a Rope"	3:29
4.	"Deathhorse"	4:55
5.	"Confessions & Alcohol"	4:11
6.	"Candystore"	4:53
7.	"Blackhearted Visions"	3:36
8.	"Bleed"	3:19
9.	"Crust"	3:50
10.	"Weightless"	5:43
11.	"The Sweet Taste of Revenge"	8:49
Total length:		49:40

== Personnel ==
=== Audrey Horne ===
- Toschie – vocals
- Ice Dale (Arve Isdal) – guitars & production
- Thomas Tofthagen – guitars
- Kjetil Greve – drums
- Tom Cato Visnes – bass
- Herbrand Larsen – keyboards & production

=== Production ===
- Produced by Audrey Horne
- Co-produced and mixed by Joe Barresi at Bay7 Studios, Los Angeles, USA
- Assistant Engineer: Mike Gardner
- Recorded at Earshot Studio, Bergen, Norway
- Mastered by Peter In de Betou at TailorMade Production, Sweden
