= Sahg =

Norwegian rock band

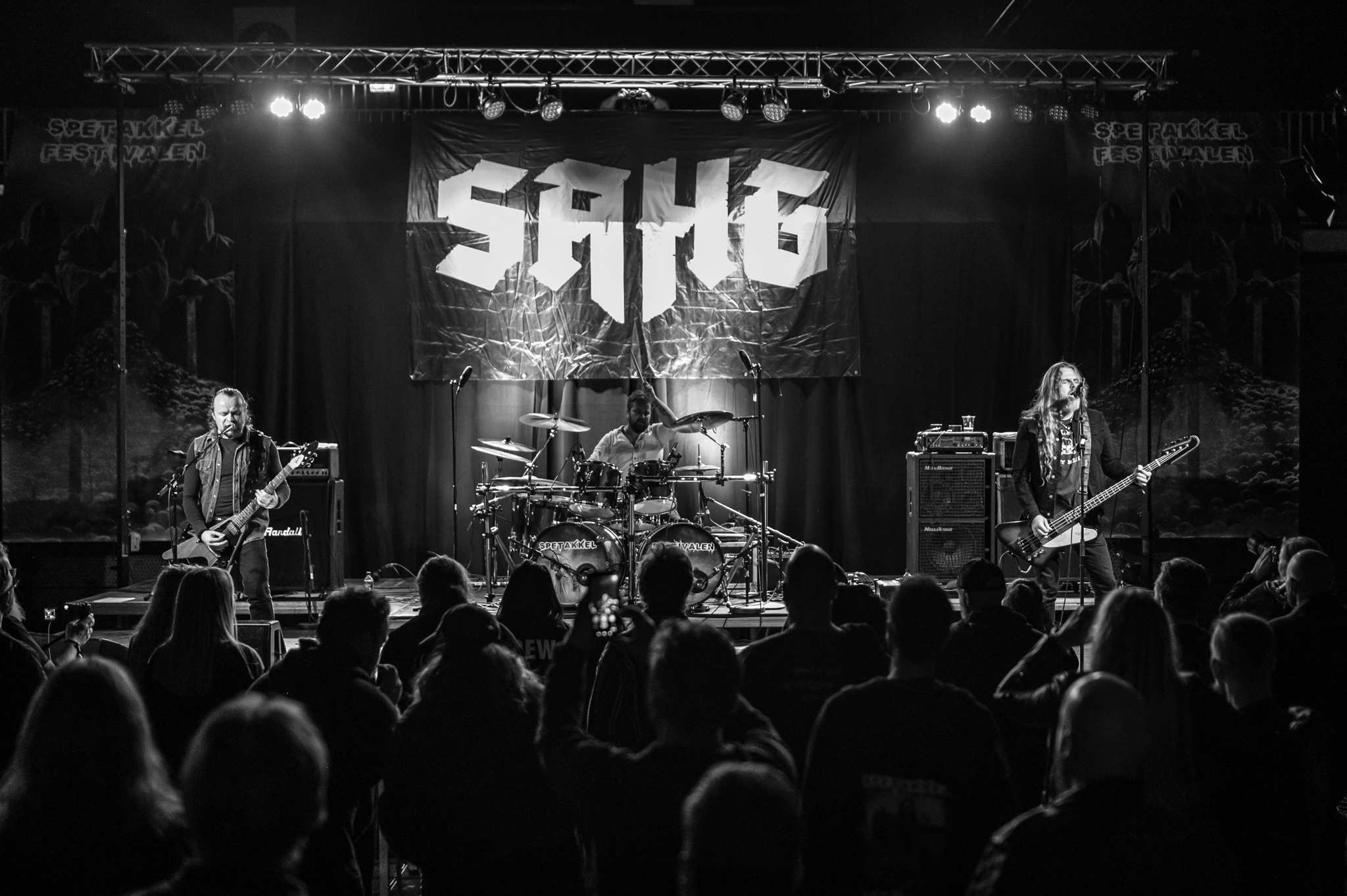
- Sahg performing in 2024

Background information
- Origin: Bergen, Norway
- Genres: Hard rock, heavy metal, doom metal, stoner metal
- Years active: 2004–present
- Labels: Regain, Indie, Drakkar
- Members: Olav Iversen; Tony Vetaas; Mads Lilletvedt
- Past members: Kvitrafn; King ov Hell; Thomas Tofthagen; Thomas Lønnheim; Ole Walaunet
- Website: sahgband.com

Sahg is a three-piece Norwegian hard rock/doom metal band formed in Bergen in the summer of 2004 by key figures in the metal scene of their country: Tom Cato Visnes (King ov Hell), Einar Selvik (Kvitrafn), Olav Iversen and Thomas Tofthagen. Iversen has been the main songwriter and the only constant member of the band since its inception. Sahg features members of Audrey Horne and Manngard.

Sahg's sound has been compared to 70s rock bands Black Sabbath and Deep Purple.

== History ==
=== Formation (2004–2005) ===
After years of involvement on different ends of the Norwegian rock and metal scene, four hard rock devotees teamed up under the name Sahg, an acronym for Structure Atlas of Human Genom (SAHG). The band originally consisted of King on bass, Olav Iversen on lead vocals and guitar, Thomas Tofthagen on guitar and Einar Selvik, better known as Kvitrafn, on drums.

Within a couple of months, the band had the first few songs written and rehearsed, and by the end of 2004, the first rough demo was distributed to a limited number of record labels, among others Swedish Regain Records. The record company responded very quickly and positively, and within another couple of months, the record contract was signed.

Throughout the winter and spring of 2005 Sahg continued to work on the material for their first album, and at the same time worked up quite a solid reputation through their live efforts on the club scene of their hometown, Bergen. 'Sahg I' was recorded and mixed throughout the summer and fall of 2005, with co-producer and additional musician Brynjulv Guddal.

=== Sahg I (2006) ===
In mid-April 2006, the band's debut album Sahg I was released across Europe, with numerous positive reviews on the album. Sahg I entered the Norwegian charts at no. 31. The album's positive reception resulted in Sahg shifting their focus into live performances. The band did some live appearances in Scandinavia throughout the summer, such as the Hole in the Sky festival in Bergen, Norway. In September 2006, they headed out on a three weeks tour of USA and Canada, supporting Celtic Frost. Along for the ride was also fellow Norwegians, 1349. Returning from there, the band started working on their second album.

Shortly after the studio process was completed, drummer Kvitrafn announced his departure from the band. After much consideration, he had decided to move with his family to a different part of Norway, to seek new opportunities and concentrate on his solo projects. There was no drama around Kvitrafn's departure, and the band accepted his decision. He stayed in the band for a couple of more months, giving them a chance to find a replacement.

After a couple of months on the look-out for a new drummer, Kvitrafn's place was filled by Tor Bjarne Bjelland, a widely experienced player, who had recently ended his engagement with a more commercially directed rock act. Tor was an old acquaintance of the band members, and he was more than eager to step up to a more intense division, and join Sahg.

The artwork for the album was created single-handedly by the band members, and the video for "Godless Faith" was shot in October the same year.

=== Sahg II (2007–2008) ===
Returning from North-America, the band was very inspired to start working on their second album Sahg II, and focused on song-writing for the next few months.

In the course of 2007, drummer Tor Bjarne Bjelland left the group and was replaced by Kjetil Greve in live performances. In 2009, Thomas Lønnheim was announced as the new official drummer.

Sahg was part of the Wacken Open Air festival in the north of Germany in 2007 and the 2008 edition of the Metal Camp fest.

=== Sahg III (2010–2012) ===
Sahg released their third album entitled Sahg III under Indie Recordings in August 2010. In 2011, King left the band to focus on his personals projects Ov Hell and God Seed. His position as bassist was assumed by Tony Vetaas, who had played live with the band in the past.

=== Delusions of Grandeur (2013–2015) ===
Sahg's fourth album entitled Delusions of Grandeur was released on 28 October 2013 in Europe. On 12 February 2014 Metal Blade Records premiered the song "Firechild" from the album in North America on the music blog lastrit.es, ahead of its official North American release on 18 February 2014.

On 7 March 2014 Sahg released their single Domno Abyssus / Tyrant Empire in limited edition on vinyl under Freshtea record label; it includes these unreleased songs "Domno Abyssus" and "Tyrant Empire".

In the beginning of 2015, the original guitarist Thomas Tofthagen and drummer Thomas Lønnheim left Sahg. Their places were taken by Ole Walaunet (Lust Kilman from Gaahls Wyrd) and Mads Lilletvedt (ex- Hellish Outcast), respectively.

=== Memento Mori (2016–2021) ===
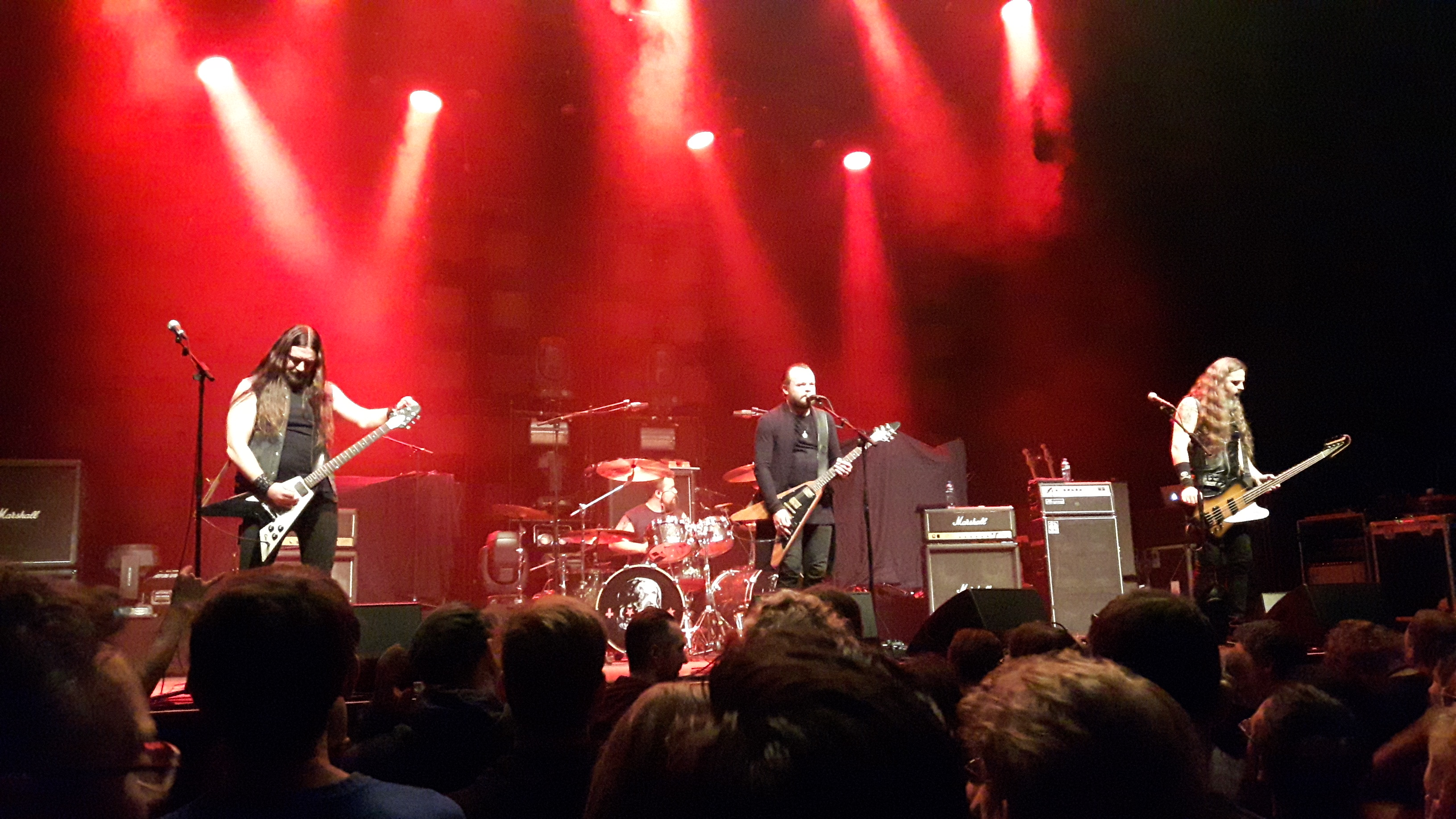
Sahg playing at 013 Tilburg in 2016

On 13 January 2016 the band announced on their official website they were in the process of recording the fifth studio album with their new lineup.

In June 2016 it was revealed that their album was titled Memento Mori. It was officially released on 23 September 2016.

At the end of 2021, guitarist Ole Walaunet left the group to concentrate on his other band, Gaahls Wyrd.

=== Born Demon (2022–present) ===
During six years the band not had any known activity. In 2022, Sahg signed a contract with the German record label Drakkar Entertainment, for first time as a three-piece band after the departure of guitarist Ole Walaunet. In April 2022 they release the single and music video "Heksedans" ("Witch Dance") . The song is a heavy metal version of a 1977 Norwegian pop hit by Bergen singer-songwriter Jan Eggum.

On 21 October 2022, Sahg's sixth album, titled Born Demon, was released. The album is characterized by its short songs, dark lyrics, a sound somewhat heavier and more dynamic than any previous recording.

== Band members ==
=== Current members ===
- Olav Iversen – vocals, guitars (2004–present)
- Tony Vetaas – bass (2011–present)
- Mads Lilletvedt – drums (2015–present)

=== Former members ===
- Tom Cato Visnes – bass (2004–2011)
- Einar Selvik – drums (2004–2006)
- Thomas Tofthagen – guitars (2004–2015)
- Tor Bjarne Bjellan – drums (2006–2007)
- Kjetil Greve – drums (session, 2007–?)
- Thomas Lønnheim – drums (2009–2015)
- Kim Gulbrandsen – keyboards (live, 2011–?)
- Ole Walaunet – guitars (2015–2022)

== Discography ==
=== Albums ===
- Sahg I (2006)
- Sahg II (2008)
- Sahg III (2010)
- Delusions Of Grandeur (2013)
- Memento Mori (2016)
- Born Demon (2022)

=== EPs ===
- More of Nothibg (2024)

=== Live albums ===
- Live Demons (2023)

=== Singles ===
- "Firechild" (2013)
- "Slip Off the Edge of the Universe" (2013)
- "Domno Abyssus / Tyrant Empire" (2014)
- "Sanctimony" (2016)
- "Silence the Machines" (2016)
- "Black Unicorn" (2016)
- "Blood of Oceans" (2016)
- "Heksedans" (2022)
- "Born Demon" (2022)
- "Fall Into the Fire" (2022)
- "House of Worship" (2022)

== Music videos ==
Year	Title	Director(s)
2006	"Godless Faith"	Tommy Naess
2008	"Pyromancer"	Asle Birkeland
2010	"Mortify"	Tommy Naess
2013	"Slip off the Edge of the Universe"	Alexander Lillevik
2016	"Black Unicorn"	Benjamin Langeland
2022	"Heksedans"	Olav Iversen / Francisco Muñoz
2022	"Fall Into the Fire"	Drain Hope
2022	"House of Worship"	På Film
