= III (Sahg album) =

Studio album by Sahg
- Released: August 23, 2010
- Recorded: Earshot Studio, Grieghallen Studio and Mackverk Studio, Bergen, Norway. 2010
- Genre: Heavy metal, doom metal
- Length: 42:22
- Label: Indie
- Producer: Herbrand Larsen

Sahg chronology
II (2008)	III (2010)	Delusions of Grandeur (2013)

Professional ratings
Review scores
Source	Rating
Allmusic	4/5 stars

III (also called Sahg III) is the third studio album by the Norwegian hard rock band Sahg, released on August 23, 2010, under the Norwegian record label Indie Recordings.

A limited special edition includes a DVD "Race with Time" with a behind the scenes documentary.

A music video was made for the track "Mortify", directed by Tommy Naess.

== Track listing ==
No.	Title	Lyrics	Music	Length
1.	"In Through The Eye"	Instrumental	Tofthagen	0:52
2.	"Baptism Of Fire"	Iversen	Iversen	3:39
3.	"Mortify"	Iversen	Iversen	4:02
4.	"Hollow Mountain"	Iversen	Tofthagen	4:42
5.	"Mother's Revenge"	Iversen	Tofthagen	6:38
6.	"Downward Spiral"	Iversen	Tofthagen	4:17
7.	"Shadow Monument"	Iversen	Iversen	4:48
8.	"Burden"	Iversen	Tofthagen	4:56
9.	"Denier"	Iversen	King	3:51
10.	"Spiritual Void"	Iversen	Iversen	4:37
Total length:				42:22

== Personnel ==
=== Sahg ===
- Olav Iversen – Vocals, Guitars, Piano (Track 10)
- Thomas Tofthagen – Guitars
- King – Bass
- Thomas Lønnheim – Drums, Percussion

=== Guest/session musicians ===
- Herbrand Larsen – Keyboards, Hammond organ, Vocals (backing)
- Lars Hammersland – Keyboards, Hammond organ
- Tony Vetaas – Vocals (backing)
- Roger Berland – Piano (Track 10)

=== Production and engineering ===
- Martin Kvamme – Cover art
- Bård Bøge – Engineering
- Kjell Arne Kjærgård – Engineering
- Herbrand Larsen – Producer, Engineering, Mixing
- Ice Dale – Co-producer, Engineering
- Chris Sansom – Mastering
- Produced by Sahg and Herbrand Larsen. Co-produced by Ice Dale.
- Recorded in Earshot Studio, Grieghallen Studio and Mackverk Studio, Bergen, Norway.
- Mixed by Herbrand Larsen in Earshot Studio.
- Mastered by Chris Sansom in Livingroom Studios, Oslo, Norway.
