= Youngblood (Audrey Horne album) =

Studio album by Audrey Horne
- Released: 2013
- Recorded: 2012
- Studio: Duper Studio; Solslottet Studio; Hermetrix Studio
- Genre: Hard rock
- Length: 54:26
- Label: Napalm Records
- Producer: Magnet

Audrey Horne chronology
Audrey Horne (2010)	Youngblood (2013)	Pure Heavy (2014)

Professional ratings
Review scores
Source	Rating
BA	4/5 stars
Dagbladet	4/5 stars
Gaffa Norway	5/6
Gaffa Sweden	1/6
Inferno	4/5 stars
Laut.de	3/5 stars
Metal Hammer	3.5/5 stars
Plattentests.de	7/10
Powermetal.de	9/10
Rock Hard	8/10
Visions	6/12

Youngblood is the fourth album by Norwegian rock band Audrey Horne, released in 2013. The album marked a stark change in direction for the band, who largely abandoned the post-grunge style typical of their previous albums in favor of a double lead guitar harmony sound, reminiscent of bands such as Thin Lizzy.

== Track listing ==
All tracks are written by Audrey Horne.

No.	Title	Length
1.	"Redemption Blues"	4:37
2.	"Straight into Your Grave"	3:50
3.	"Youngblood"	4:36
4.	"There Goes a Lady"	3:52
5.	"Show and Tell"	4:47
6.	"Cards with the Devil"	4:07
7.	"Pretty Little Sunshine"	3:42
8.	"The Open Sea"	4:24
9.	"This Ends Here"	3:51
10.	"The King Is Dead"	5:13

Bonus tracks
No.	Title	Length
11.	"I Wanna Know You"	3:15
12.	"This Ends Here" (Demo)	3:59
13.	"The Open Sea" (Demo)	4:17
Total length:		54:26

== Personnel ==
=== Audrey Horne ===
- Toschie – vocals
- Ice Dale (Arve Isdal) – guitars
- Thomas Tofthagen – guitars
- Kjetil Greve – drums
- Espen Lien – bass

=== Additional Personnel ===
- Kim Gulbrandsen – keyboards

=== Production ===
- Produced by Magnet
- Engineered by Iver Sandøy
- Mixed by Jorgen Dupermann
- Recorded at Duper Studio, Solslottet Studio and Hermetrix Studio

== Charts ==
Chart (2013)	Peak position
Belgian Albums (Ultratop Wallonia)	191
German Albums (Offizielle Top 100)	66
Norwegian Albums (VG-lista)	10
