= Audrey Horne (band) =

Norwegian hard rock band

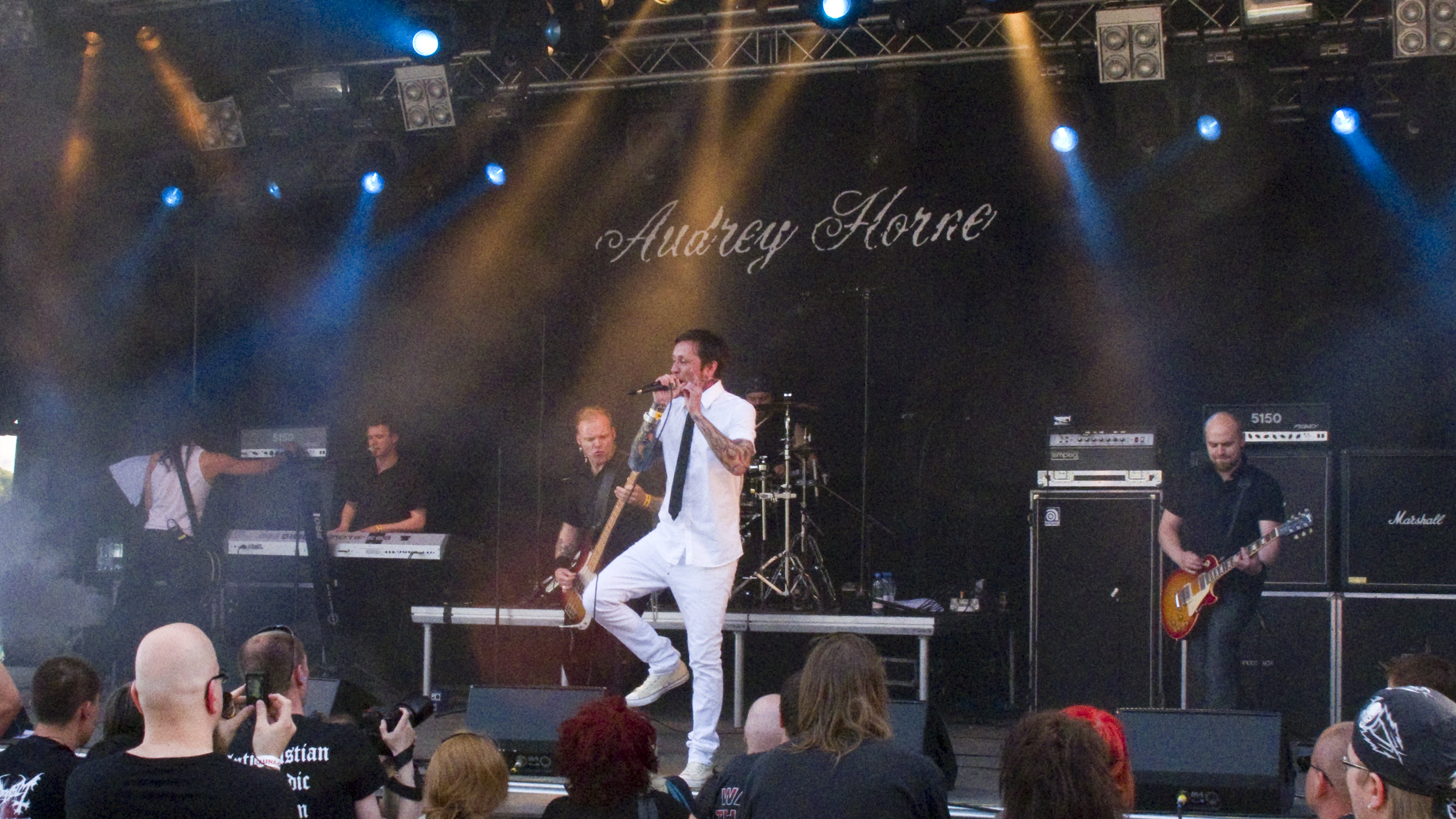
- Audrey Horne at Sauna Open Air 2010

Background information
- Origin: Bergen, Norway
- Genres: Hard rock, post-grunge
- Years active: 2002–present
- Label: Napalm Records
- Members: Torkjell Rød; Arve Isdal; Thomas Tofthagen; Espen Lien; Kjetil Greve
- Past members: Herbrand Larsen; Tom Cato Visnes

Audrey Horne is a Norwegian hard rock band from Bergen. Formed in 2002, the band took its name from the character in the TV series Twin Peaks. The band's musical style is a mixture of heavy and melodic classic rock, inspired by Iron Maiden, Kiss, Ozzy Osbourne, Van Halen, Mötley Crüe, Deep Purple and Led Zeppelin. Audrey Horne has released seven studio albums, one live album and one EP.

== History ==
=== 2002–2006: Formation and debut album ===
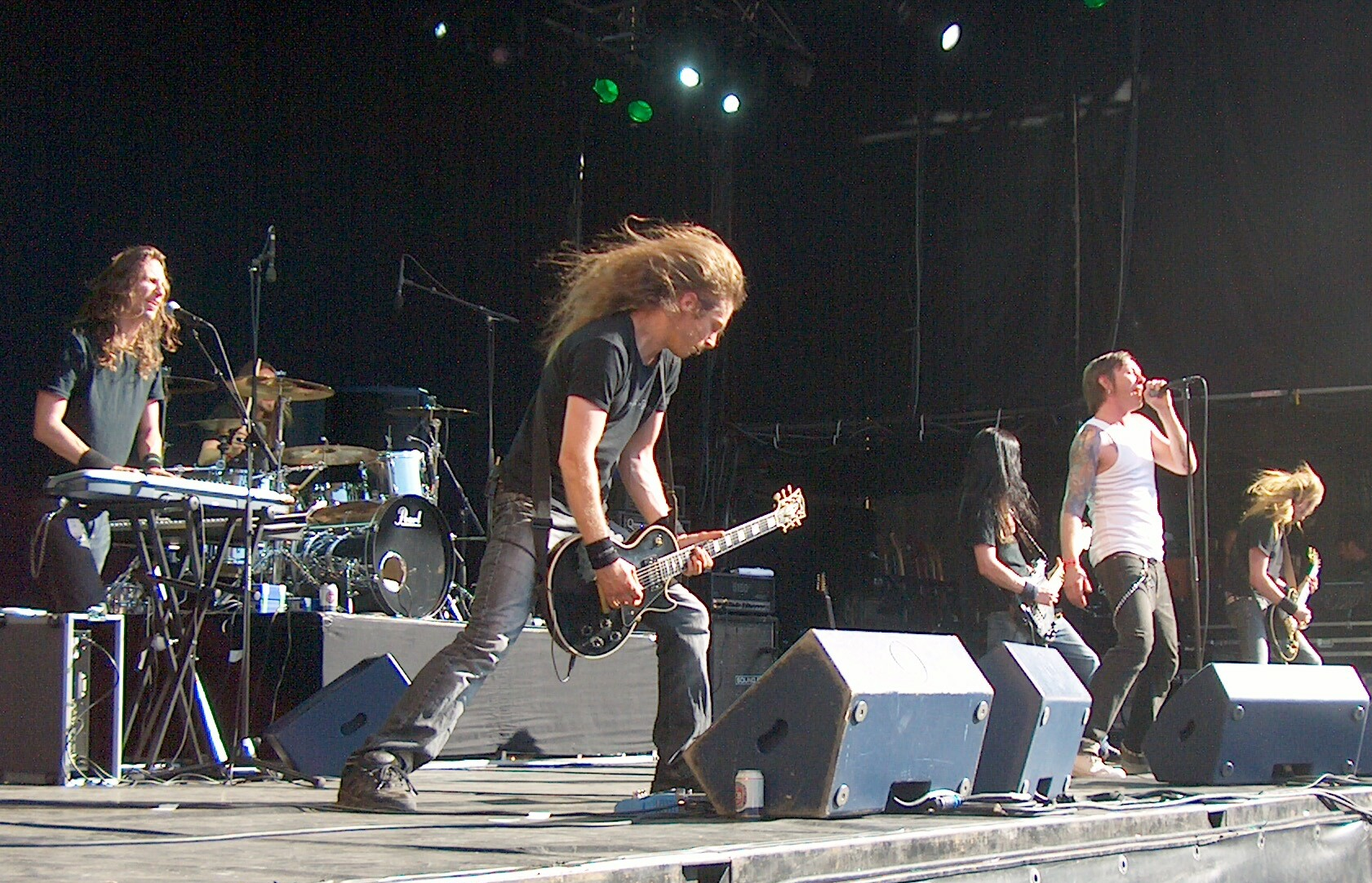
Audrey Horne at Quart Festival 2005. From left to right: Herbrand Larsen, Kjetil Greve, Arve Isdal, Tom Cato Visnes, Torkjell Rød and Thomas Tofthagen.

Audrey Horne was formed in 2002 by guitarist Thomas Tofthagen (Sahg), bassist Tom Cato Visnes (Gorgoroth, I, God Seed, Sahg, Ov Hell) and drummer Kjetil Greve (Deride), with vocalist Torkjell "Toschie" Rød (Sylvia Wane), guitarist Arve Isdal (Enslaved, I) and keyboardist Herbrand Larsen (Enslaved) completing the band's lineup. The band's name was suggested by a member who was watching Twin Peaks at the time. Although most of the members were associated with or would go on to play in bands with a more extreme or progressive sound, Audrey Horne was conceived as a hard rock band rooted in classic and heavy rock.

The band released the EP Confessions & Alcohol and their debut album No Hay Banda in 2005. The album was recorded at Earshot Studio in Bergen and produced by the band and Joe Barresi. The producer, known for his work with Queens of the Stone Age and Kyuss, reduced his usual salary to work with the band. No Hay Banda received good reviews and the band won a Norwegian Spellemann Award in the Metal category, in addition to being nominated for Newcomer of the Year, in 2005. The band toured the club scene and different festivals in Norway throughout the year.

=== 2007–2008: Lineup changes and Le Fol ===
In 2007, keyboardist Larsen and bassist Visnes left the band, with the latter wanting to focus on Gorgoroth and Sahg, and the former needing more time for his job as a primary school teacher and playing with Enslaved. Later that year, Audrey Horne released their second studio album, Le Fol, produced by guitarist Isdal, and co-produced and mixed by former keyboardist Larsen, who also contributed keyboard parts. Like its predecessor, the album was recorded at Earshot Studio. Le Fol received good reviews in both Norwegian and international press and earned Audrey Horne a Spellemann Award nomination in the Metal category.

The band progressed from playing mainly club shows in Norway to playing clubs and festivals in Europe, and went on a European tour with Enslaved and Kraków in November and December 2008. The tour took the band through Denmark, Germany, Belgium, United Kingdom, Netherlands, France, Spain, Italy, Austria, Slovenia, Switzerland, Czech Republic, Poland, Lithuania, Latvia, Estonia, Finland and Sweden, before ending in Norway. The touring schedule took a toll on vocalist Rød's voice to the point where he could hardly sing towards the end of the tour and caused him to stop smoking.

=== 2009–2017: Audrey Horne, Youngblood and Pure Heavy ===
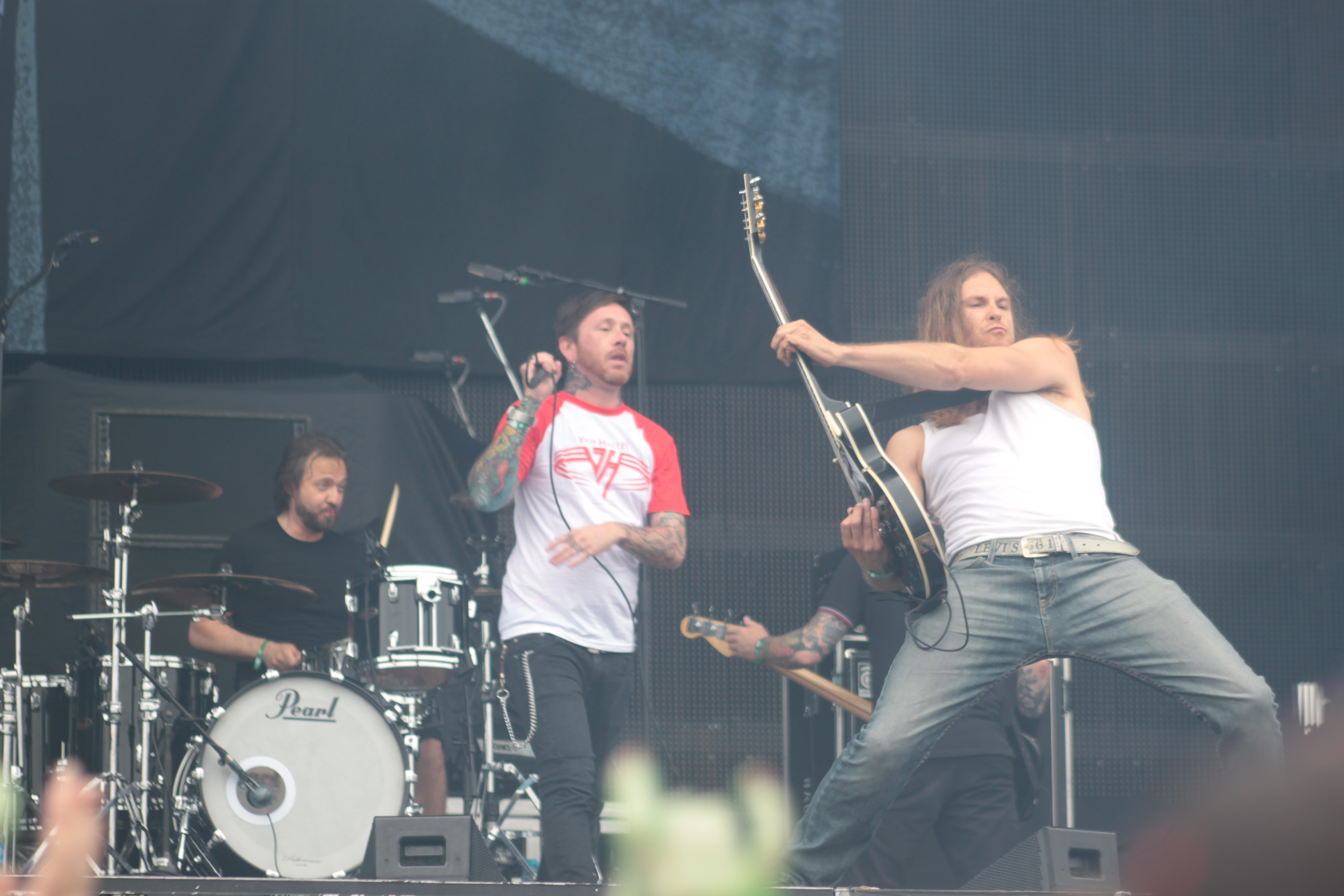
Audrey Horne at Hellfest 2013

In 2009, the band reunited with producer Barresi at his studio in Los Angeles to record their self-titled album. Drums, guitars and vocals were first recorded at Barresi's studio, before the band returned to Bergen and the expanded Earshot Studio, Conclave & Earshot Studio, to record bass, keyboards and additional vocals and guitar tracks. The album was mixed by Barresi at his studio and featured then-touring bassist Espen Lien and keyboard contributions by touring member Eyolf Nysæther and Herbrand Larsen, the latter also serving as a recording engineer. The album was released in 2010 and received good reviews. Bassist Lien officially joined the band in 2012.

In 2013, Audrey Horne released their fourth studio album, Youngblood. The band made changes to their songwriting process by writing the songs in the rehearsal studio with all the members, as opposed to their usual approach of guitarists Isdal and Tofthagen writing music on their own and Rød writing melody lines, harmonies and lyrics. Audrey Horne toured Europe in support of the show, including several festival appearances. The band followed up Youngblood in 2014 with the album Pure Heavy, capitalising on a creative period for the band and the writing process that had been used on their last album. The years following the release of Pure Heavy was spent touring and playing festivals in Norway and Europe, while the members of the band also focused on other commitments and musical projects.

=== 2018–present: Blackout, first live album and Devil's Bell ===
In 2018, the band released their sixth studio album, Blackout. The album received good reviews, and Audrey Horne played several European festivals and other tour dates later that year and in 2019. In February 2020, the band released their first live album, Waiting for the Night, with recordings from their shows at USF Verftet and Bergenfest in Bergen in 2018. A tour with Formosa and Magick Touch started in March, but was cancelled after five shows due to the COVID-19 pandemic. Audrey Horne released their seventh studio album, Devil's Bells, in 2022.

== Band members ==
=== Current members ===
- Torkjell "Toschie" Rød – vocals (2002–present)
- Arve "Ice Dale" Isdal – guitars, backing vocals (2002–present)
- Thomas Tofthagen – guitars, backing vocals (2002–present)
- Espen Lien – bass, backing vocals (2012–present; live member 2009–2012)
- Kjetil Greve – drums (2002–present)
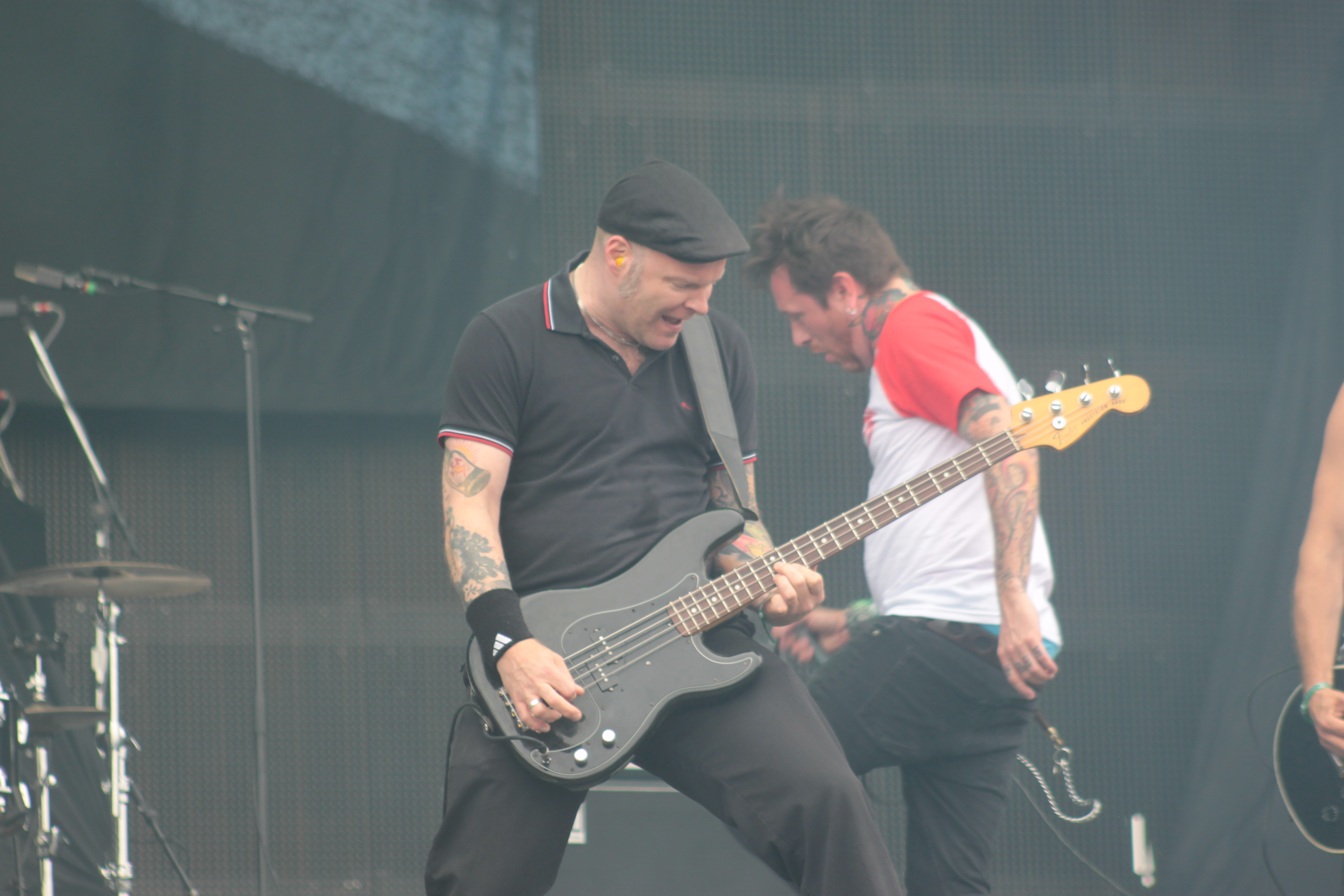
Espen Lien and Torkjell Rød

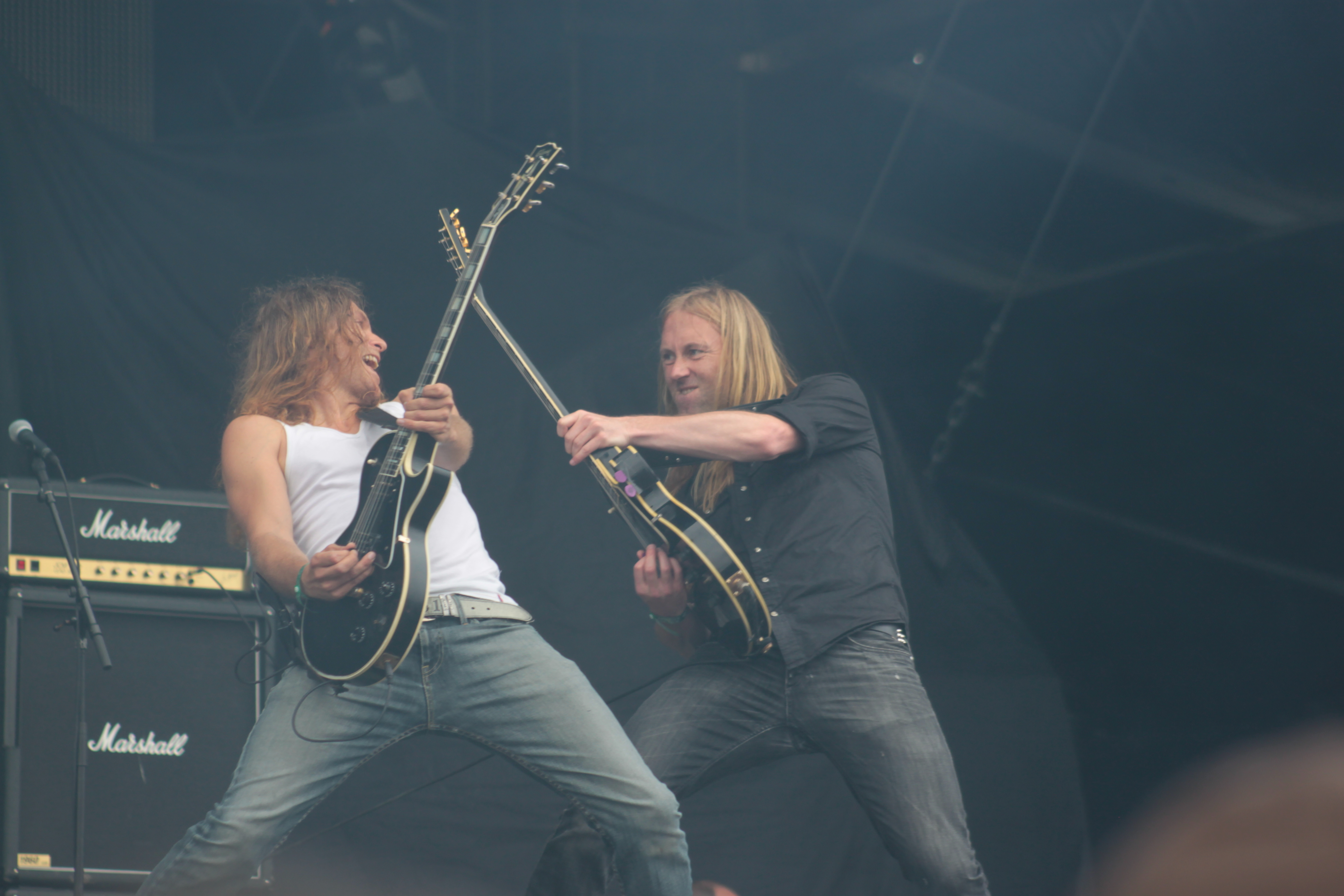
Arve Isdal and Thomas Tofthagen

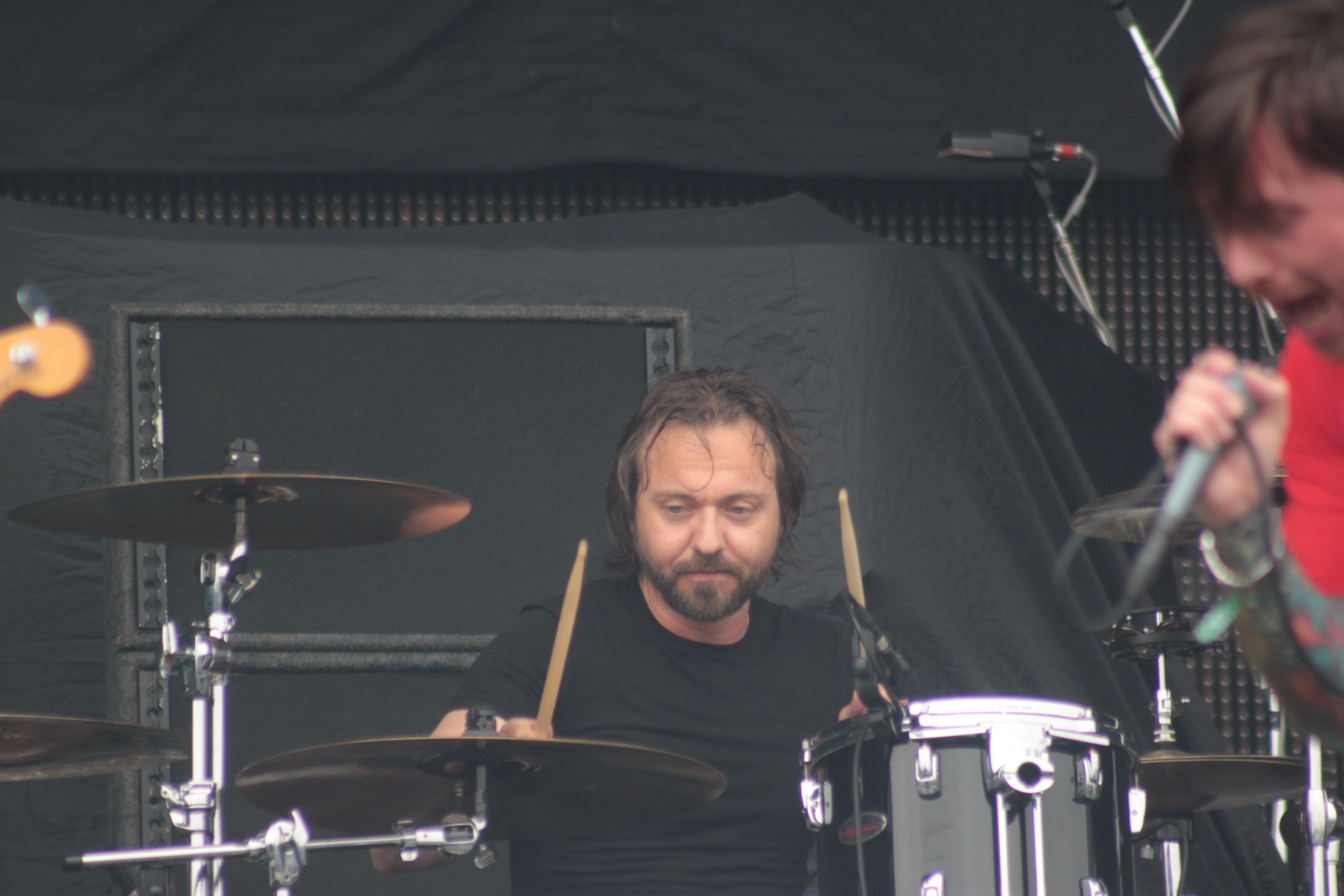
Kjetil Greve

=== Former members ===
- Tom Cato Visnes – bass, backing vocals (2002–2007)
- Herbrand Larsen – keyboards, backing vocals (2002–2007)

=== Live members ===
Current members

- Kim Gulbrandsen – keyboards, backing vocals (2010–present)

Former members

- Marius Fimland – bass, backing vocals (2007–2009)
- Eyolf Nysæther – keyboards, backing vocals (2007–2009)
- Ola Walaunet – guitars (2008)
- Tore Christer Storlid – bass, backing vocals (2008–2009)
- Cato Olaisen – drums (2008–2009)
- Bård Bøge – bass, backing vocals (2009)

== Discography ==
=== Studio albums ===
- No Hay Banda (2005)
- Le Fol (2007)
- Audrey Horne (2010)
- Youngblood (2013)
- Pure Heavy (2014)
- Blackout (2018)
- Devil's Bell (2022)
- Achilles (2026)

=== Live albums ===
- Waiting for the Night (2020)

=== EPs ===
- Confessions & Alcohol (2005)

== Awards and nominations ==
Spellemann Awards

Year	Category	Work	Result
2005	Metal	No Hay Banda	Won
2005	Newcomer of the Year	No Hay Banda	Nominated
2007	Metal	Le Fol	Nominated
