= Octavia Sperati =

Norwegian gothic metal band

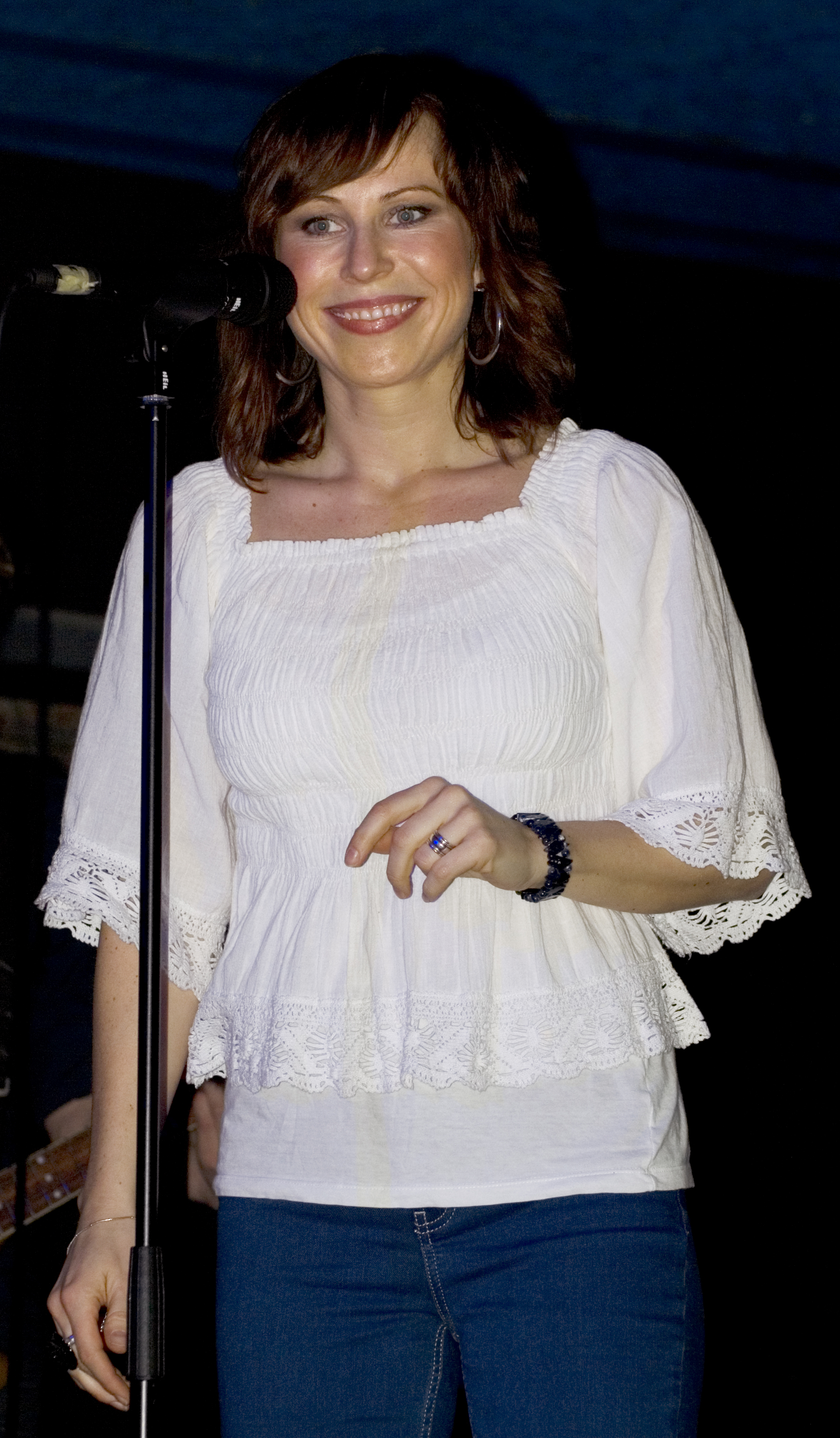
- Silje Wergeland of Octavia Sperati band during Budapest concert, 2010.

Background information
- Origin: Bergen, Norway
- Genres: Gothic metal, doom metal
- Years active: 2000–2008; 2015–present
- Labels: Candlelight Records
- Members: Silje Wergeland; Bodil Myklebust; Gyri S. Losnegaard; Trine C. Johansen; Tone Midtgaard; Ivar Alver

Octavia Sperati, formerly known as Octavia, is a Norwegian gothic metal band from Bergen, Norway.

The group released their debut album Winter Enclosure in 2005. Their second album, Grace Submerged, was released in May 2007. Both albums were released by Candlelight Records, and both releases were followed by a tour in the United Kingdom. The band is currently all female except for the drummer, Ivar Alver.

On 20 July 2008, Octavia Sperati announced that they would be "taking a break."

On 10 March 2009, it was announced that their singer Silje Wergeland had joined Dutch rock band The Gathering, replacing singer Anneke van Giersbergen.

On 21 February 2015, Wergeland announced Octavia Sperati's reunion via Twitter.

== Discography ==
- Guilty (demo) (2002)
- Winter Enclosure (2005)
- Grace Submerged (2007)

== Members ==
Current lineup

- Silje Wergeland – vocals (2000–2008, 2015–present)
- Bodil Myklebust – guitars (2000–2002, 2004–2008, 2015–present)
- Gyri S. Losnegaard – guitars (2001–2008, 2015–present)
- Trine C. Johansen – bass guitar (2000–2008, 2015–present)
- Tone Midtgaard – synthesizer, keyboards (2001–2008, 2015–present)
- Ivar Alver – drums (2006–2008, 2015–present)

Former members

- Silje Røyseth – drums (2000–2001)
- Hege Larsen – drums (2001–2004)
- Christoffer Risbakk Vegsund – drums (2004–2006)
