= Noroff Education =

Noroff
- Type: Vocational school and university college
- Established: 1987
- Affiliations: Galileo Global Education
- Students: Approximately 4,000 students
- Location: Oslo, Bergen, Kristiansand, Norway
- Website: noroff.no

Noroff Education AS is a Norwegian educational institution offering online vocational and higher education within technology and digital media.

== Organisation ==
Noroff delivers education through Noroff Vocational School AS and Noroff University College AS.

- Noroff University College offers bachelor's degrees in areas such as Cyber Security, Digital Forensics, Applied Data Science, and Interactive Media. All programmes are taught in English and are available both on campus and online.
- Noroff Vocational School offers programmes in IT, design, animation, film production, music production, and other digital disciplines.

All programmes are accredited by NOKUT (the Norwegian Agency for Quality Assurance in Education) and are eligible for loans and grants through Lånekassen, the Norwegian State Educational Loan Fund.

Noroff has approximately 4,000 students The administration and main offices are located in Kristiansand, Norway. The CEO is Erik Brandt.

Since 2020, Noroff has been part of Galileo Global Education, the largest private higher education group in Europe.

== History ==
Noroff was established in 1987. During the 1990s, the company transitioned from a course and consultancy provider to a formal educational institution under the name Noroff Institute, focusing on IT and media studies.

In 2012, Noroff received accreditation from NOKUT to offer university college education, and Noroff University College AS was established.

In 2015, the company was acquired by Trym Skeie through Noroff Education AS. In 2020, the company became part of Galileo Global Education.
