= Ov Hell =

Norwegian black metal band

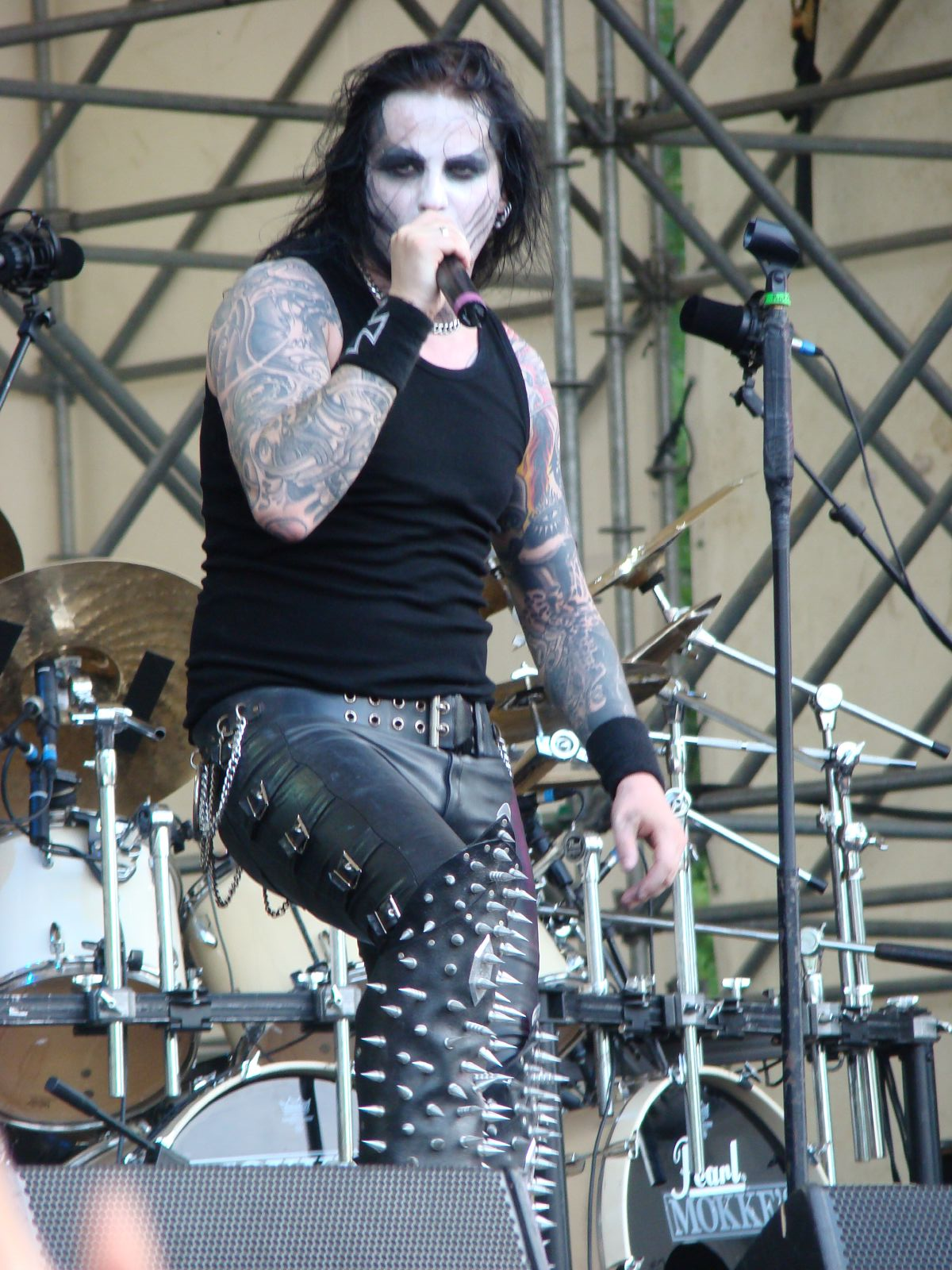
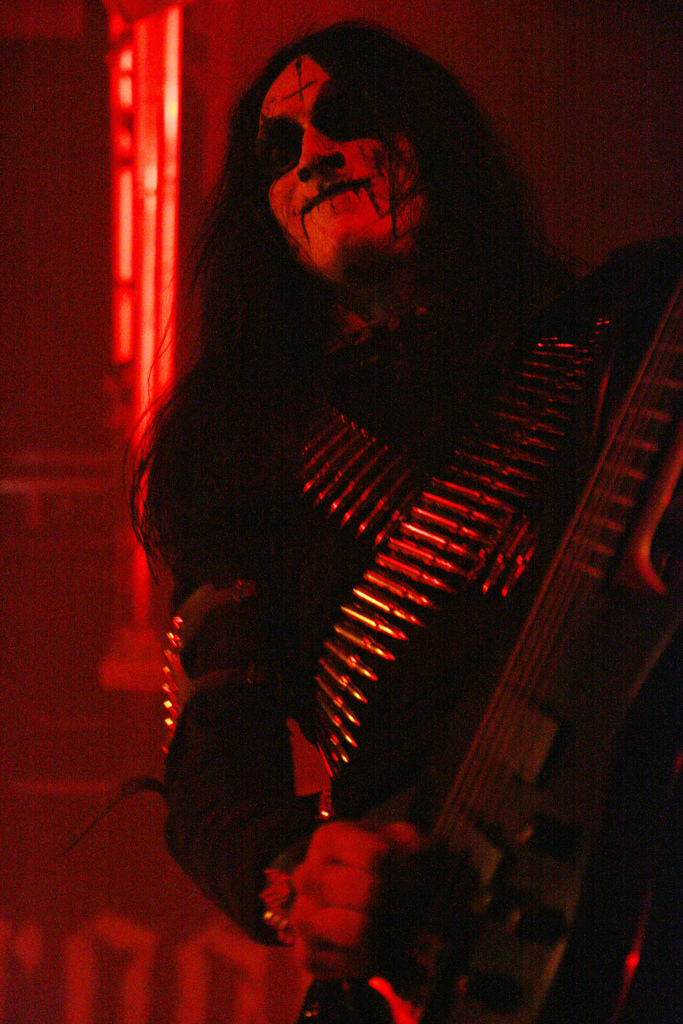
- Shagrath and King ov Hell

Background information
- Origin: Norway
- Genre: Black metal
- Years active: 2009–present
- Labels: Indie Recordings (Europe); Prosthetic Records (North America)
- Members: Shagrath; King ov Hell

Ov Hell is a Norwegian black metal supergroup started by Shagrath and King ov Hell in 2009. Indie Recordings released the band's debut album, The Underworld Regime, in February 2010.

== History ==
=== Background ===
King ov Hell and Shagrath formed Ov Hell following the temporary dissolution of God Seed in July 2009, which King and Gaahl had formed in March that year after the conclusion of the Gorgoroth name dispute that had started in October 2007.

God Seed performed at Hellfest Summer Open Air and With Full Force in summer 2009, covering songs from the Gorgoroth albums Twilight of the Idols and Ad Majorem Sathanas Gloriam. During this period, Gaahl was expected and claimed to be writing lyrics and recording vocals for the band's intended debut album. The rest of the album had been recorded in 2008, with drummer Frost, Teloch and Ice Dale on guitars, and bassist King. Citing a lack of enthusiasm, Gaahl quit God Seed at the With Full Force festival and retired from metal music. King reincorporated the music intended for the God Seed debut album into Ov Hell, and Shagrath wrote and recorded lyrics and vocals. Indie Recordings released the album, The Underworld Regime, in Europe in February 2010. Prosthetic Records released it in the US in April 2010.

=== Present situation ===
Ov Hell has never performed live. In November 2009, King said that he expected the band to tour and play festivals in the future, but in May 2010, he revealed that because of his and Shagrath's schedules, Ov Hell would not play any concerts, and would instead be a studio-only band.

== Band members ==
Current members

- Shagrath – vocals (2009–present)
- King ov Hell – bass, backing vocals (2009–present)

Session members

- Teloch – guitars (2009)
- Frost – drums (2009)
- Ice Dale – guitars (2009)

== Discography ==
- The Underworld Regime (2010)
