= Devilstone Open Air =

Heavy metal music festival in Lithuania

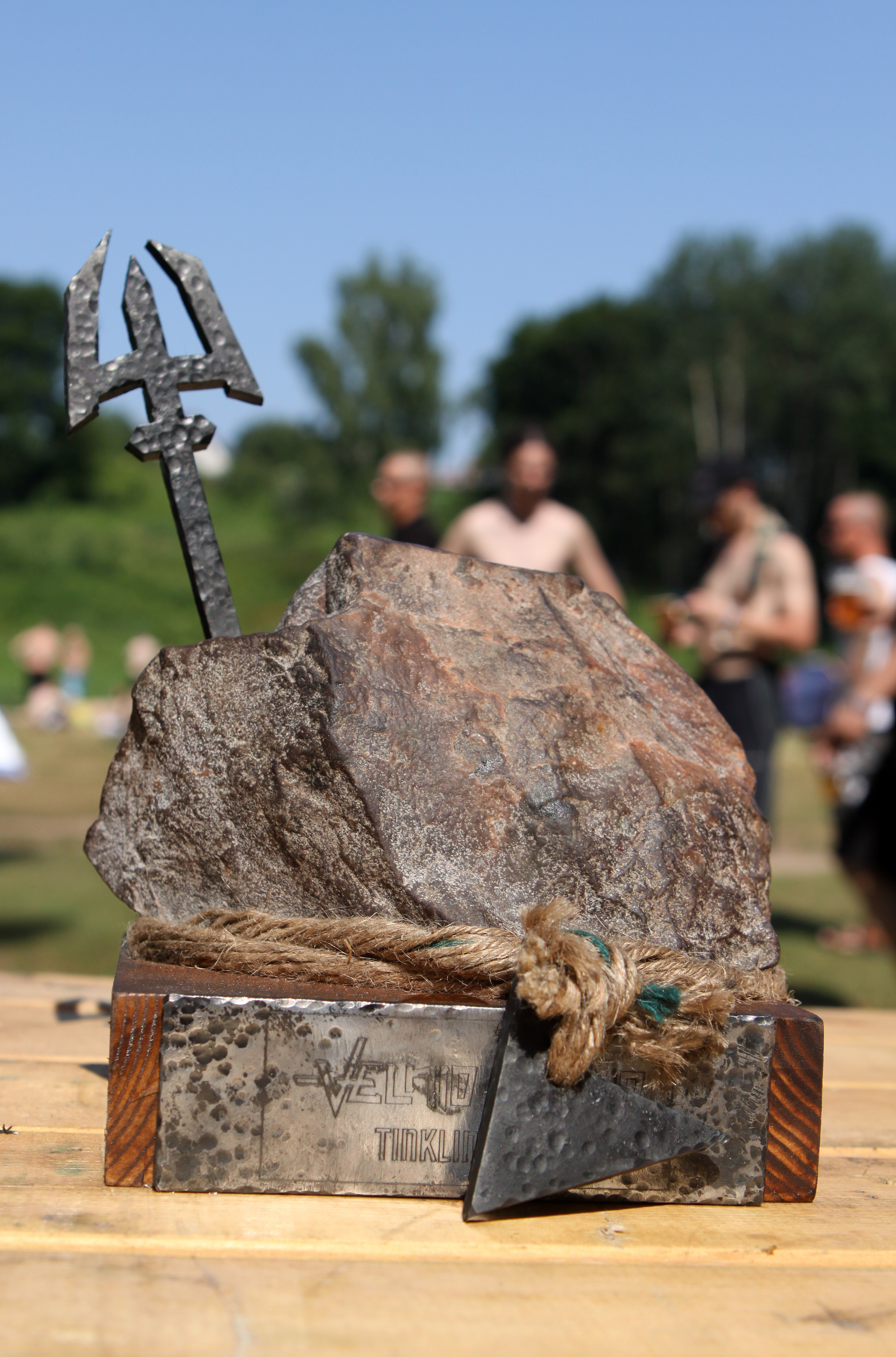
- Devilstone Open Air Football Cup
- Genre: Rock, metal, alternative, electronic music
- Dates: mid-July 2015
- Locations: Anykščiai, Lithuania
- Years active: 2009–2023
- Website: devilstone.net

Devilstone Open Air (aka "Velnio Akmuo" in Lithuanian) was a summer open air rock and heavy metal music festival. It took place annually from 2009 to 2023 in the town of Anykščiai, in Lithuania. Devilstone Open Air has included performers playing black metal, death metal, power metal, thrash metal, sludge metal, doom metal, post rock, stoner rock, and progressive rock music genres. Music bands from Europe, North and South America, and Australia have performed in the festival. Devilstone Open Air is usually held in the mid-summer, around the third weekend of July.

== Other activities ==
Next to live music performances, Devilstone Open Air has workshops, masterclasses, a club night called Rocktheque, sports tournaments, and other activities. The festival owns the rights to a one-of-a-kind growling/screaming/grunting competition MC Growl.

== Controversy ==
In 2009 Lithuanian Association of Exorcist labeled the band Sepultura, who were announced to play at the festival, as ‘satanic’ based on their lyrics. Local church spoke against the festival’s choice of title. In 2010 Mayhem performed at the festival. After their performance, the local priest collected photographic evidence and went to the Ministry of Justice with a request to investigate the band's performance. The priest supported by a group of believers claimed that “Norwegian band Mayhem, that took part in the festival, incited religious hatred.” In 2011 the band Ondskapt performed at the festival. During the performance the band member Kim stepped out naked onto the stage creating a resonance within the society. In 2012 six Lithuanian towns held religious adorations for the festival’s audience and a faithful congregation prayed next to the festival gates.

== Line-up history ==
Year	West stage	East Stage	Gamma Stage
2009	Sepultura, Keep of Kalessin, Code, Sinister, Azarath, Dissimulation, Bilocate, Trauma, Obtest, Crocell, Diabolical, Frailty, Heaven Grey, Leprous, Luctus, Nahash, Saples, Stranger Aeons, The Prowlers, Žas.	No second stage.	No third stage.
2010	Mayhem, Grave, Tankard, Nightmare, Pantheon I, White Skull, Dominanz, Devious, Battalion, Helevorn, Argharus, Gorath, Izegrim, Valkyrja, Lie In Ruins, Scythian, Semargl, Burying Place.	No second stage.	No third stage.
2011	Inquisition, Benediction, Susperia, Forgotten Tomb, October Tide, In Mourning, Ondskapt, Hellish Outcast, Deville, Obtest, Paralytic, Gama Bomb, Mutant, Pergalė, Anomaly, Decadence, Savage Messiah, Soul Stealer, Mandragora, Pekla, Life’s Edge, Stiffer, Nahum, Muscat.	No second stage.	No third stage.
2012	Anathema, Aura Noir, Alcest, Lake of Tears, Kampfar, Enforcer, Scarab, Thornafire, Dead Shape Figure, Horricane, Paralytic, Sanctimony, Inquisitor, Ossastorium, Lucifer.	Hexvessel, Truckfighters, Soundarcade, New Keepers Of The Water Towers, Haken, Blowback, Honcho, The Grand Astoria, 9Horizon, Warbringer, Demonical, Lucky Funeral, Spiral, Freaks On Floor, Wulture.	No third stage.
2013	Enslaved, Shining, Avulsed, Vomitory, Koldbrann, Angelus Apatrida, Kongh, Wolf, Argharus, La Chudra, Cantilena, Exile Into Suffery.	Orange Goblin, Kadavar, Samsara Blues Experiment, Tides from Nebula, Stoned Jesus, Battalion, Stiffer, The Perfect Pill, Indygo, Taine, Tesa.	No third stage.
2014	Arch Enemy, Devlsy, Evil Invaders, Havok, In Solitude, Inquisition, Juodvarnis, Mord'a'Stigmata, Obscure Sphinx, Pergalė, Preternatural, Vader, Villainy.	Birth of Joy, Blues Pills, Church of Misery, Coogans Bluff, Extravaganza, Get Your Gun, Lucifer, Metal Messiah, Minor Modesty, Nevesis, Necroriser, pg.lost, Shining, Suma, Talbot, Tesa, Turbowolf.	Feedbak, Jimmy Glitschy, Monkey Tank, North Bend, Omerta, Show Me a Dinosaur.
2015	Katatonia, Suicidal Angels, Striker, Lost Society, The Moth Gatherer, Kontinuum, Kataklysm, Dust Bolt, Au-Dessus, Phrenetix, NRCSSST, Eschatos, Goresoerd.	Motorama, Greenleaf, Stoned Jesus, Marduk, Maybeshewill, Belzebong, Tombstones, Radio Moscow, Planet of Zeus, Omerta, Sraigės efektas, The Vintage Caravan, Pyro Trees, The Stubs, Stormgrey.	No Real Pioneers, Förtress, Fashion Games, Hellhookah, The Chillibows, Non-Playable Character, Art of Keeping Secrets, Faršas.

In 2009-2013 festival also had a very small stage titled MetalClinic dedicated for music improvisations, competitions, surprise performances, Masterclasses, workshops, MC Growl fights. Anyone capable and willing to play a music instrument can use this stage for performance.

== Picture gallery ==
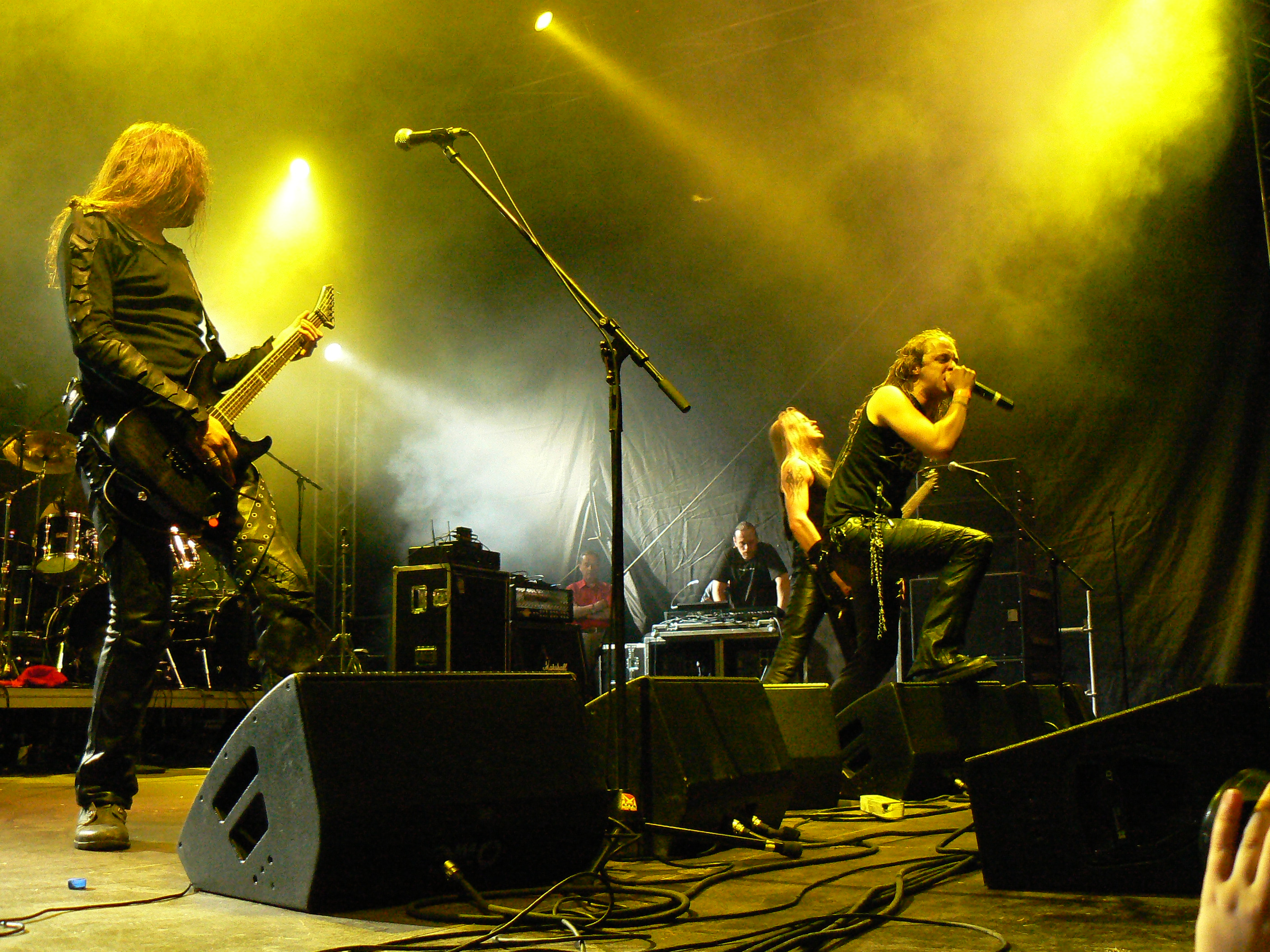
Keep of Kalessin performing at Devilstone Open Air 2009

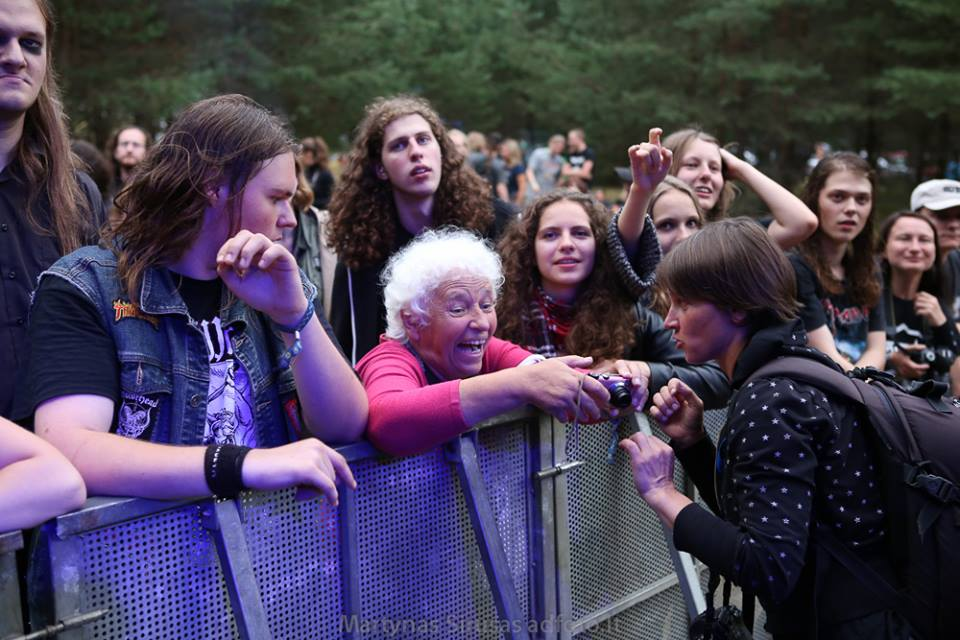
Devilstone Open Air 2013 people

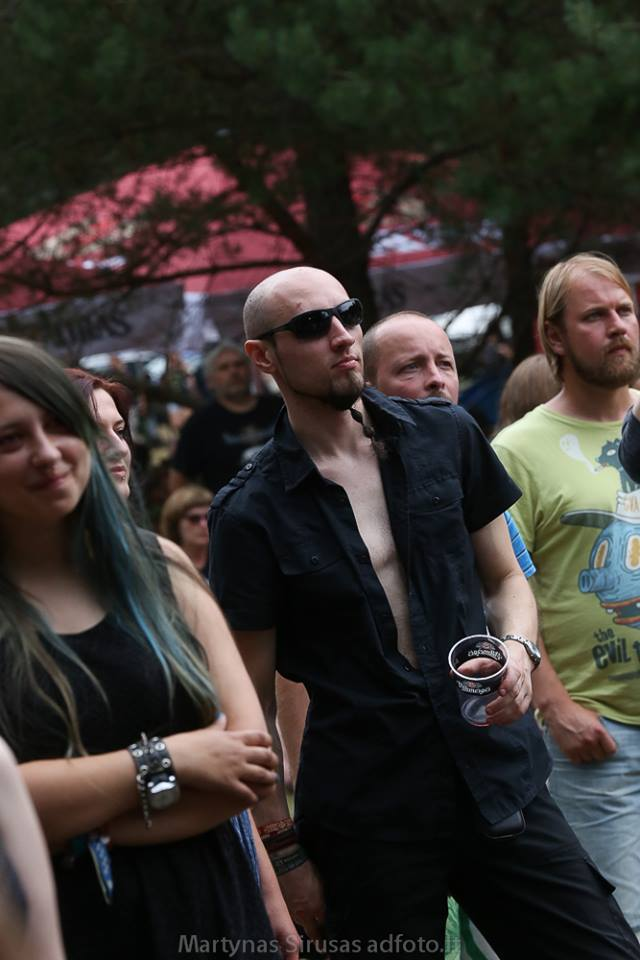
Devilstone Open Air 2013 people

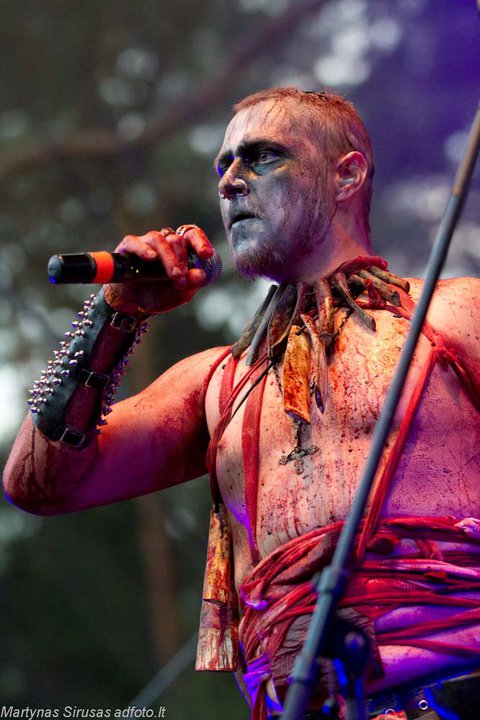
Ondskapt performing at Devilstone Open Air 2011

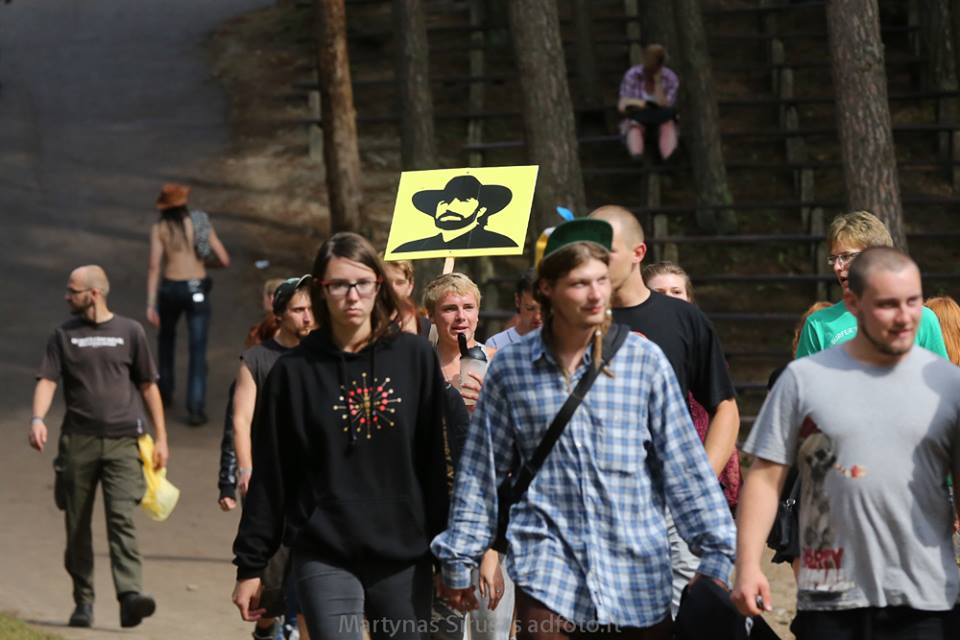
Devilstone Open Air 2013 people

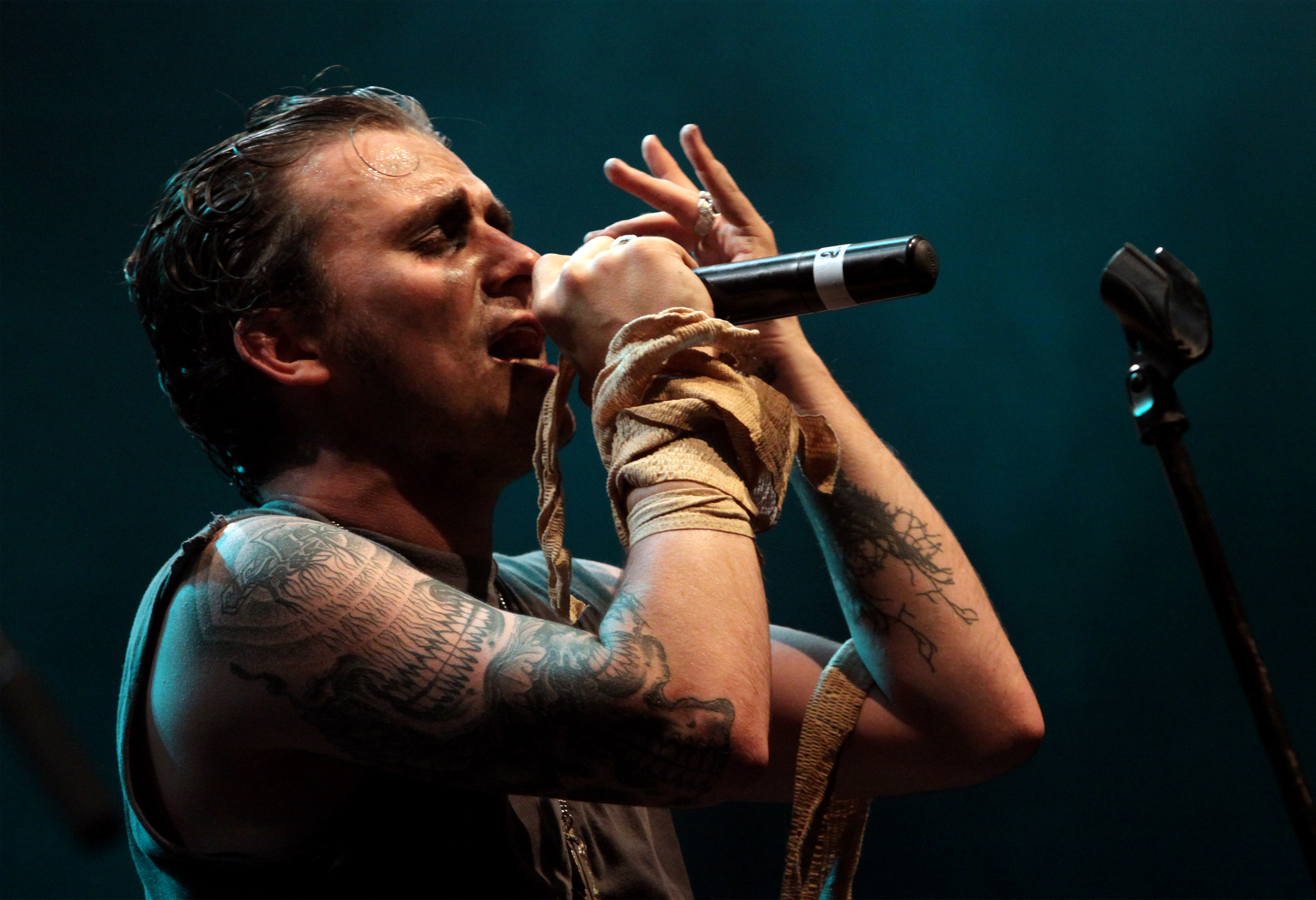
Code performing at Devilstone Open Air

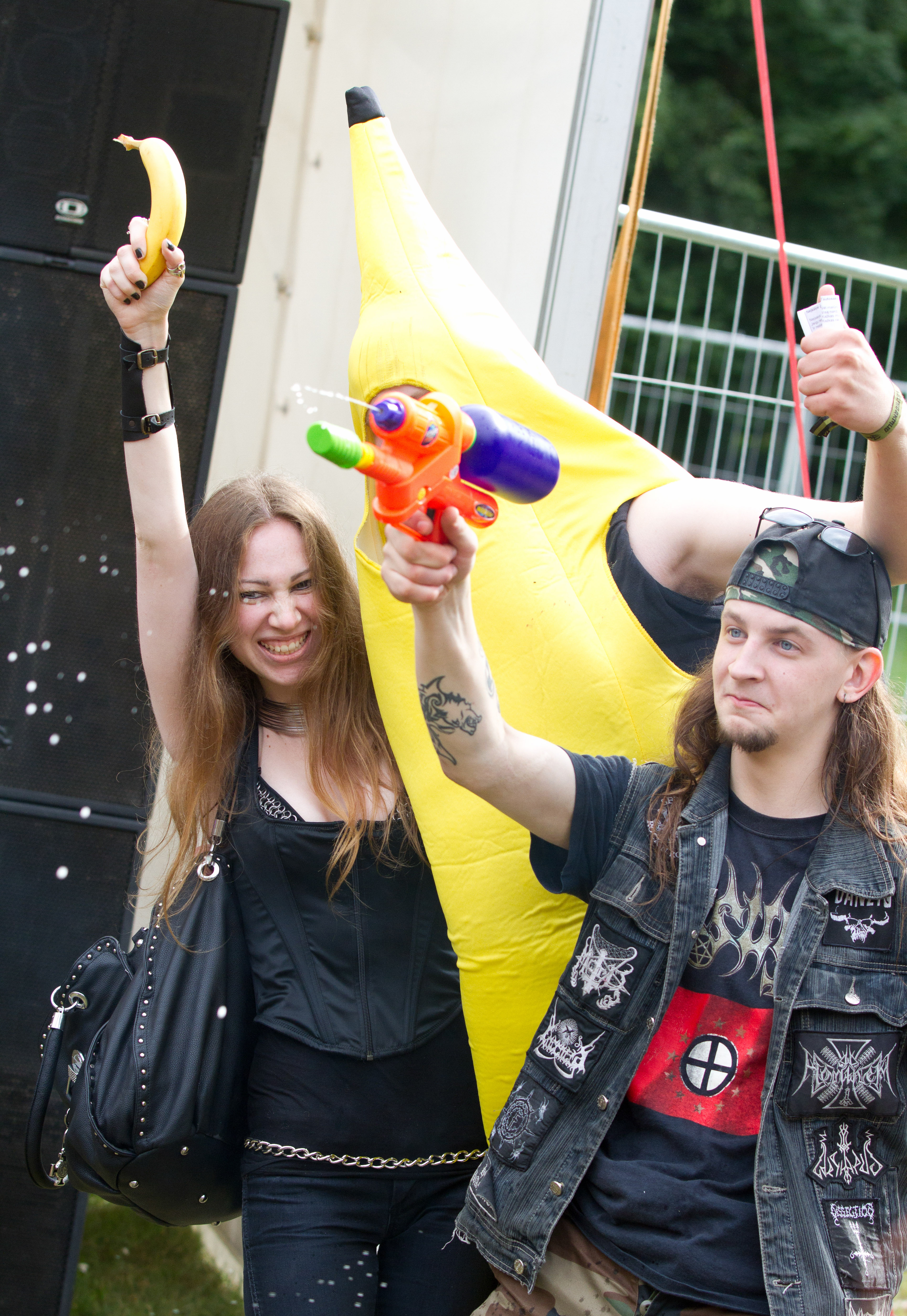
Devilstone Open Air people

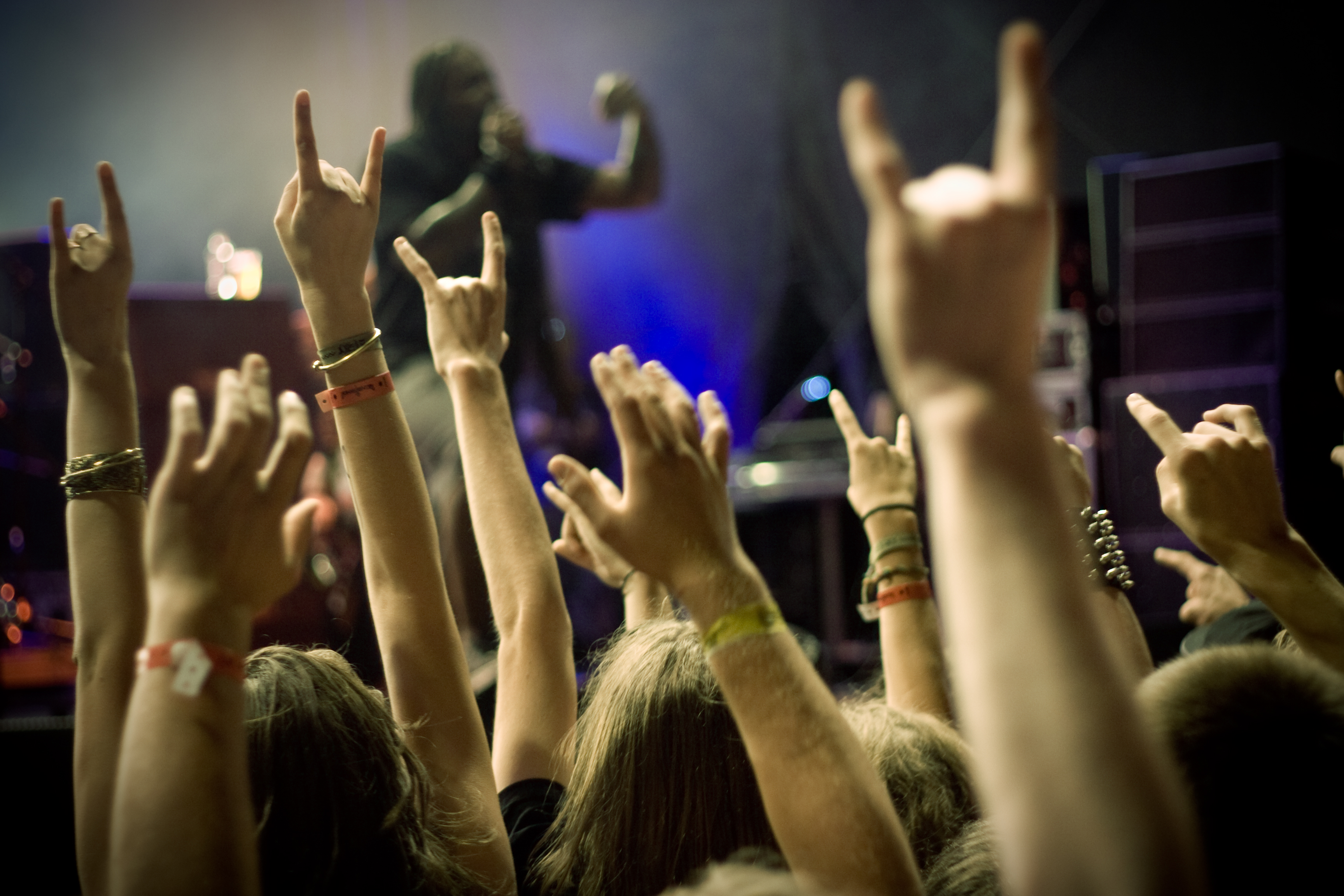
Devilstone Open Air crowd

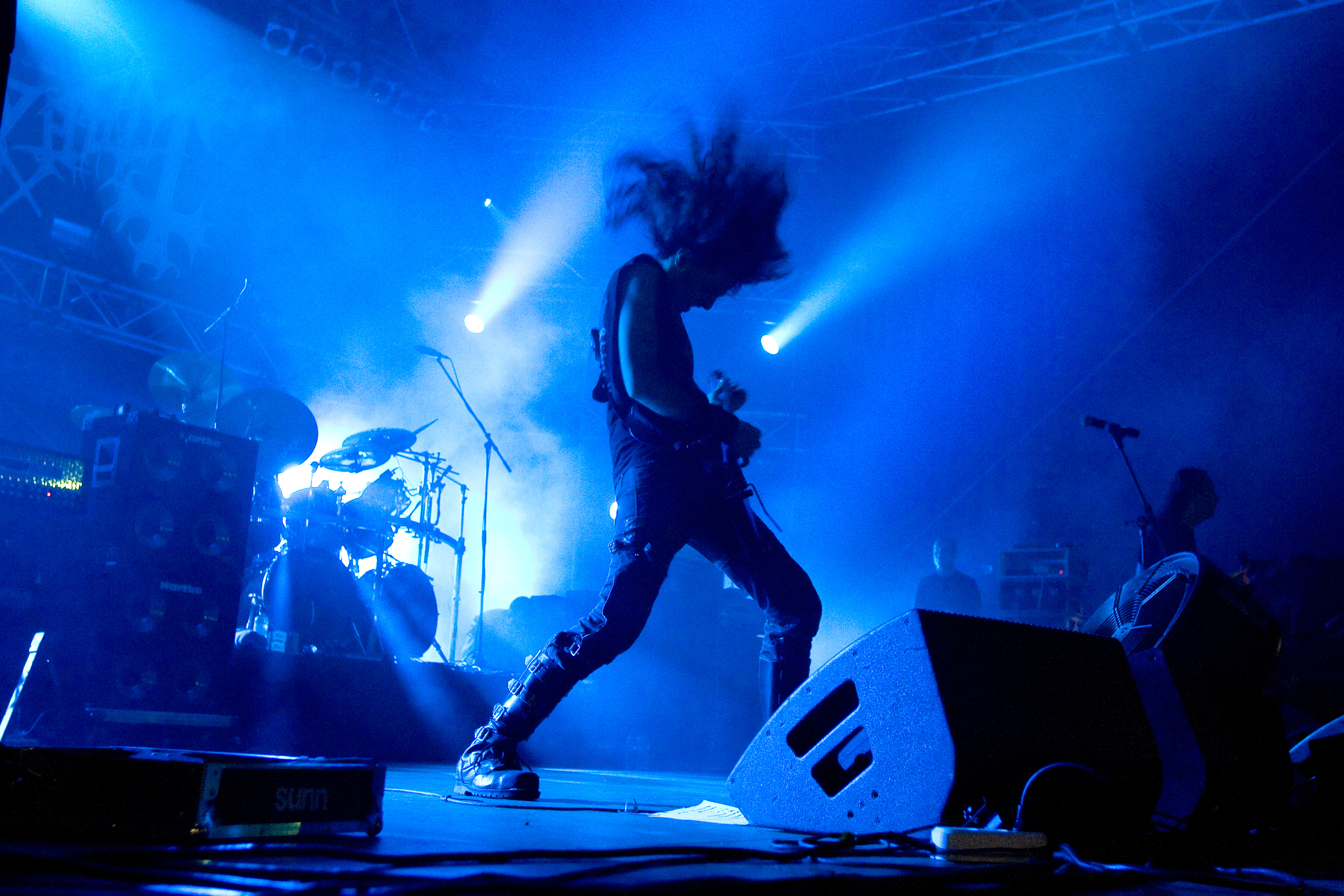
Mayhem performing at Devilstone Open Air

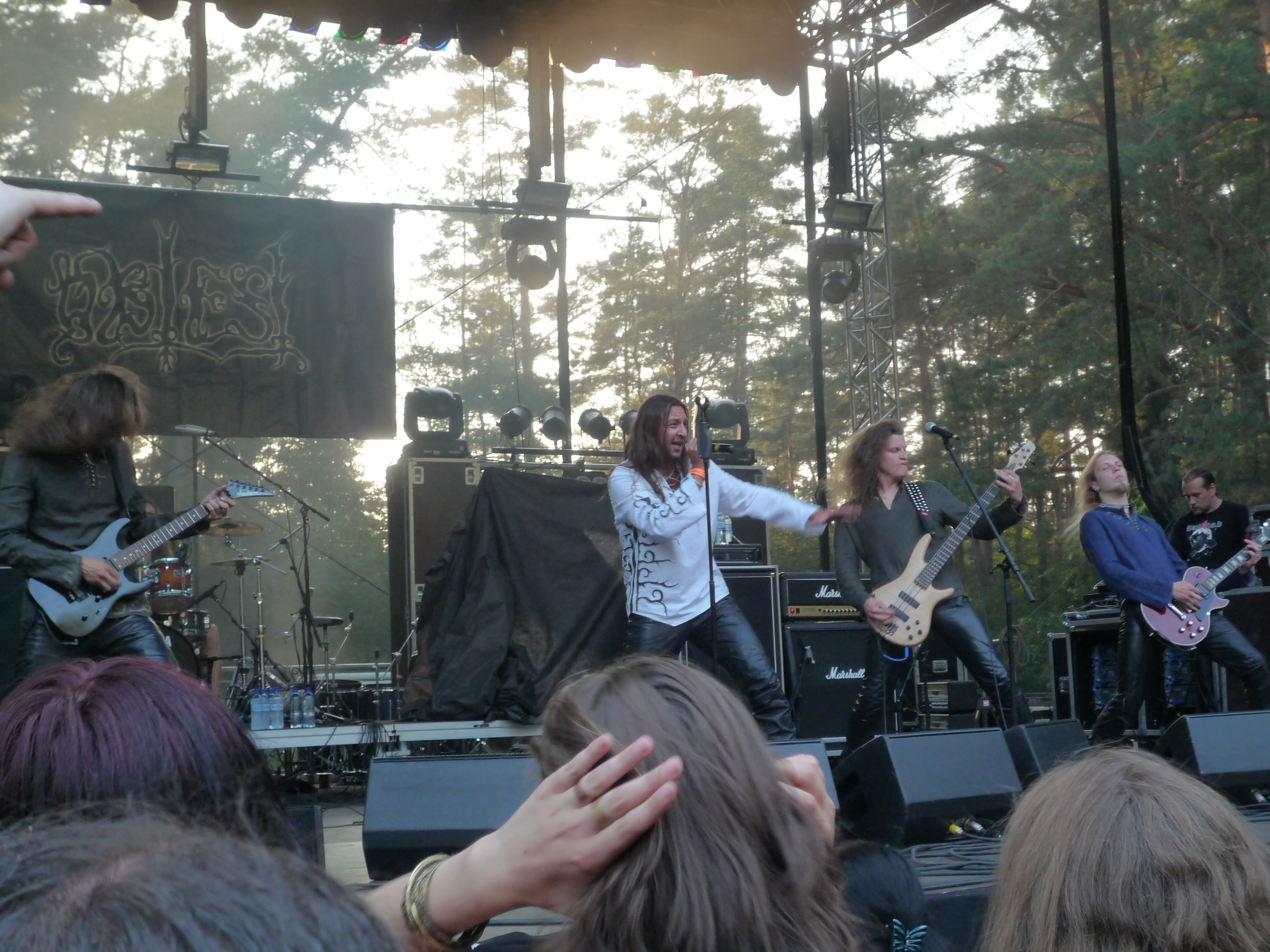
Obtest performing at Devilstone Open Air
