= Maggot Heart =

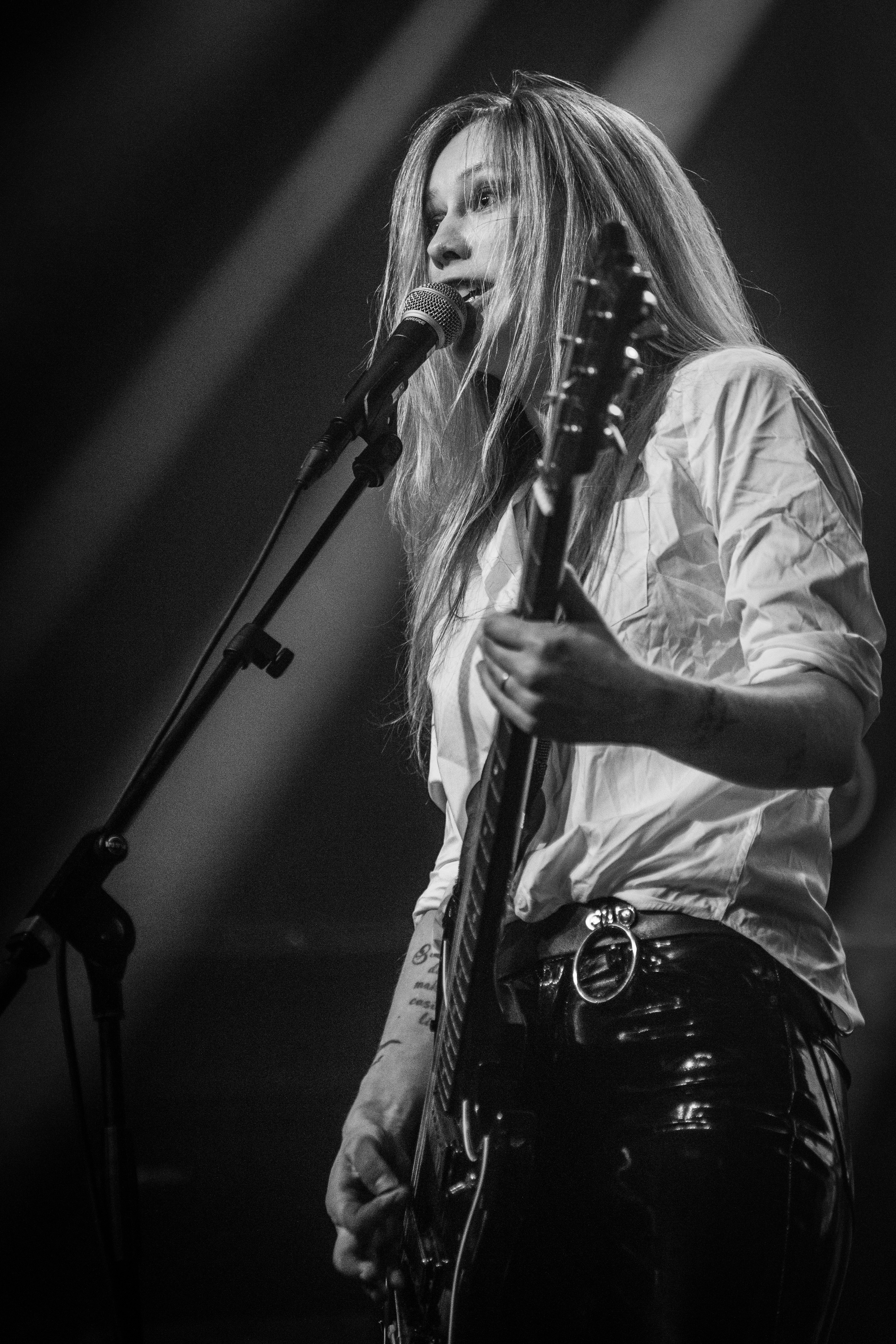
- Maggot Heart at Roadburn

Background information
- Origin: Berlin, Germany
- Genres: Hard rock; post-punk; heavy metal; noise rock; garage punk
- Years active: 2016 – active
- Labels: Teratology Sound & Vision, Rapid Eye Records, Svart Records
- Members: Linnéa Olsson; Olivia Airey; Uno Bruniusson
- Website: maggotheart.com

Maggot Heart is a rock band based in Berlin, Germany.

== History ==
The band formed in 2016 as solo project of Swedish guitarist, vocalist and songwriter Linnéa Olsson, who released in May 2017 the debut EP City Girls on the Berlin-based label Teratology Sound & Vision. The EP was recorded together with Linnéa's long time friends and formerly In Solitude members Uno Bruniusson on drums (who also played together with Olsson in the band Grave Pleasures) and Gottfrid Åhman on bass guitar. Åhman also handled the recording together with Pierre Somville. Shortly after the EP release, Maggot Heart played its first live show Live Evil Berlin 2017, followed by some dates in Germany with black metal act OCCVLTA.

In October 2017, an official video clip for the track "Show Them Your Teeth", released at the same time as digital single, premiered on Decibel Magazine, directed by Sarah Ben Hardouz. The video, explains Linnéa on Decibel Magazine, "revolves around oppression and how to break free from it. I chose to exemplify this from a female point of view, you see some common forms of oppression, from domestic abuse to expectations of motherhood, to harassment and so on."

In December 2017, Maggot Heart entered the studio again to record its first full-length.

A few months later, in February 2018, the band embarked on a European tour together with Uppsala's Reveal!, and then in April of the same year performed at the renowned Roadburn festival, starting to make a name for itself quite quickly in the underground music environment, thanks to their intense and energetic live performances.

In May 2018 Maggot Heart premiered the song "Medication", followed by the digital single "Blood Envy" in July, and shortly after that, released on Teratology Sound & Vision its first studio album, "Dusk to Dusk". The album was recorded at Studio Cobra in Stockholm once again with Uno Bruniusson on drums and Gottfrid Åhman on bass guitar, as well as on additional guitar on some tracks. Bruniusson and Åhman also co-wrote some of the songs with Linnéa. The cover artwork was made by Kristian Valbo of Norwegian band Obliteration, who also performed on drums with Maggot Heart on a few live shows when Bruniusson could not play due to other commitments.

"Dusk to Dusk" was described by the label on the press release as "an album well informed by what has happened in music since the late seventies, yet never relying on past achievements" with "snarling, rusty guitars that wouldn’t be out of place on neither a Killing Joke nor a Stooges record" and "a powerful rhythm section that is at times reminiscent of the maddening stomp that put noise rock heroes like The Jesus Lizard or The Birthday Party in the pantheon of rock music." According to Linnèa, it "was a very dark album in several ways. It dealt with a lot of subconscious matters of the mind, past trauma, violence and existential anxiety."

The second half of 2018 saw Maggot Heart going through a phase of intense live activity: after performing at different summer festivals, the band took part in Voivod's European 35th anniversary tour in September, and then in October, played several venues across Europe with Danish dark rockers Slaegt.

During this time, Maggot Heart used to perform as a four piece composed of Linnéa Olsson, Uno Bruniusson, Olivia Airey on bass guitar and Neta Shimoni on second guitar.

In October 2018 Teratology Sound & Vision published an official video for the song "Pinned Like A Butterfly", directed Lewis Lloyd.

In November 2018, the album "Dusk to Dusk" also got a nomination at Swedish musical awards P3Guld.

In the spring of 2019, Maggot Heart embarked for their first U.S. tour, opening for King Dude alongside Kate Clover and the positive reception showed by the American audience, brought the band to finalize their first North American headlining tour in August of the same year, as well as the participation in another tour in North America as opening act to Earthless, together with Sacri Monti, a few months later. The trio also managed to tour Mexico for the first time in September 2019, performing a series of shows in the major cities of the country.

After this tour, Maggot Heart entered the Studio Cobra in Stockholm once again, to record their second full-length, "Mercy Machine". The album was announced in May 2020, when the title track premiered on Brooklyn Vegan. "Mercy Machine" was co-produced by Maggot Heart and Martin "Konie" Ehrencrona, with the usual line-up consisting of Linnéa Olsson, Uno Bruniusson on drums and Olivia Airey on bass guitar, which by then had become Maggot Heart's steady line up, plus the contribution of Gottfrid Åhman on second guitar and as co-writer of a few tracks. The cover artwork was once again created by Kristian Valbo.

The band's second full-length also became the first release on Rapid Eye Records, Berlin-based label founded by Linnéa Olsson herself and Ricky of Swamp Bookings, Maggot Heart's booking agency. Two more songs were premiered prior to the album release: "Justine" and "Gutter Feelings". A few months later, in November 2020, an official video was published for the song "Sex Breath", directed by Alexandra Macià, entirely rendered in a retro style which tributes the aesthetic of the VHS era.

April 2021 saw the release of an official video for the song "Roses", this time directed by Linnéa herself. Shortly after that, Maggot Heart took part in the 2021 online edition of Roadburn Festival, renamed Roadburn Redux (which switched to a virtual version due to the ongoing pandemic at that time) and streamed a 15-minute performance, recorded live earlier that year, at urban Spree in Berlin.

In July 2021, Rapid Eye Records announced a split EP by Maggot Heart and Norwegian band OKKULTOKRATI, released on September 24. The two bands had already toured together previously and as a teaser to the EP, premiered a track from each side of the split: "No Song" by Maggot Heart and "Wolfssegen" by OKKULTOKRATI.

On September 29, 2023, Maggot Heart published their third album "Hunger", co-released by the labels Rapid Eye Records and Svart Records. The album was preceded by the singles "Looking Back At You" (also with a lyric video), "This Shadow" (accompanied by a video by Finnish director Tekla Valy), and "Archer". The album deals with the idea of hunger seen as something that can drive you but also devour you, similarly as in the Buddhist idea of desire, as Linnéa explains in an interview in September 2023: "Simply put, it's about the idea that the hunger you have for life is a power. It is your drive and your ambition and something that constantly drives you forward and takes you further. But ultimately it is also something that can become an obsession, an addiction and thus a destructive force."

The band then embarked on a U.S. in October 2023 with Italian band MESSA.

== Members ==
=== Current members ===
- Linnéa Olsson – vocals, guitar (2017–present)
- Uno Bruniusson – drums (2017–present)
- Olivia Airey – bass guitar (2017–present)

=== Guest studio members ===
- Gottfrid Åhman – guitar, bass guitar (2017–present)

=== Live members ===
- Neta Shimoni – guitar (2017–2018)

== Discography ==
=== Singles and EPs ===
- City Girls (Teratology Sound & Vision, 2017)
- Show Them Your Teeth (Teratology Sound & Vision, 2017)
- Split EP w/ OKKULTOKRATI (Rapid Eye Records, 2021)

=== Studio albums ===
- Dusk to Dusk (Teratology Sound & Vision, 2017)
- Mercy Machine (Rapid Eye Records, 2020)
- Hunger (Rapid Eye Records, Svart Records 2023)

=== Compilations ===
- City Girls + Dusk to Dusk (Caligari Records, 2019)
