= Linnéa Olsson =

Swedish rock musician (born 1986)

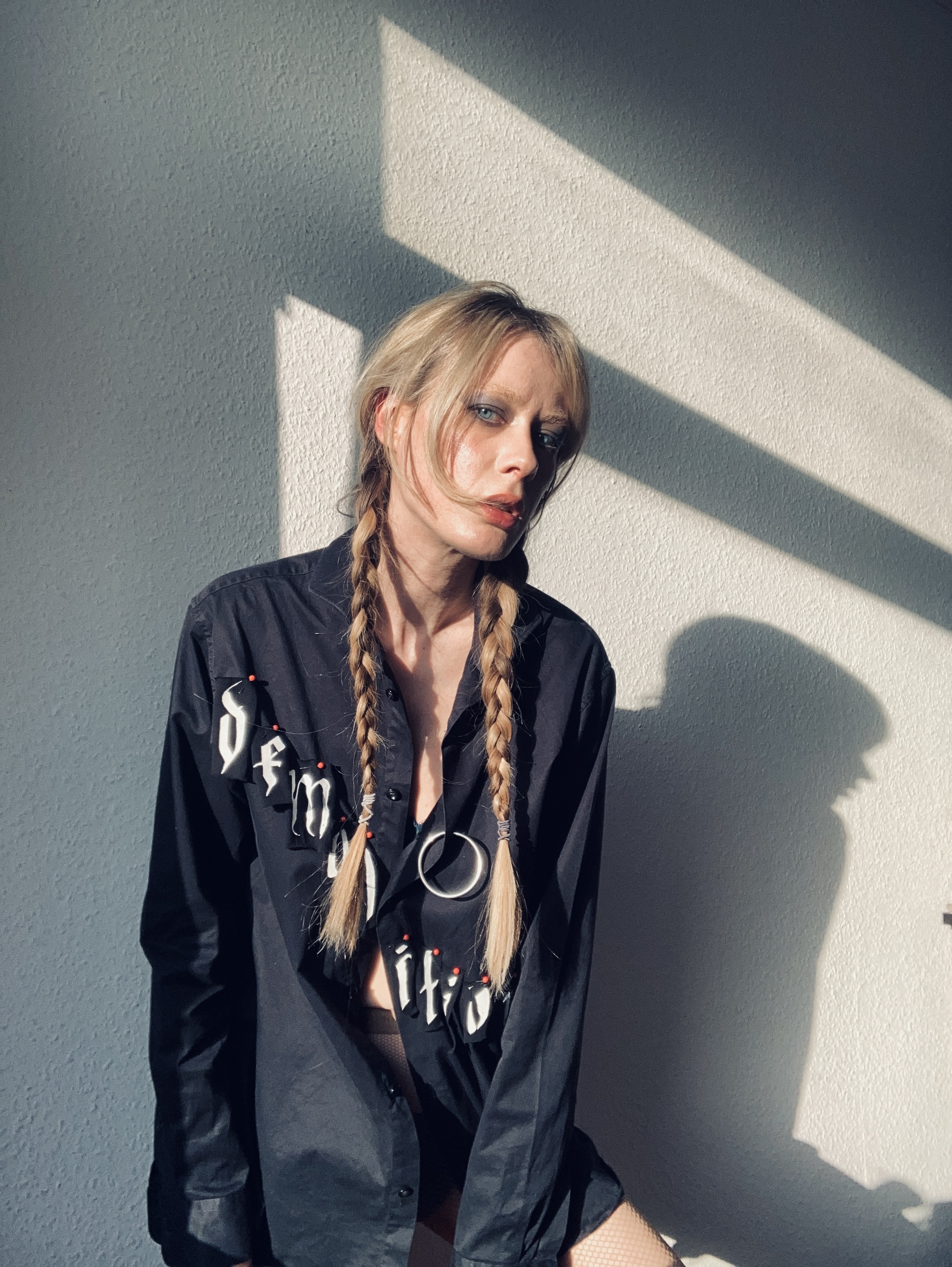
Linnéa Olsson in 2024

Linnéa Olsson is a Swedish musician and songwriter based in Berlin, Germany. She is best known as the singer and guitarist in the rock band Maggot Heart.

== Early life ==
Olsson was born in Stockholm and grew up in Linköping. As a child, she sang in choirs and played the piano, flute, saxophone, and guitar. Olsson has mentioned The Rolling Stones, The Sex Pistols, Swedish death metal, and Guns N' Roses as early influences. She began a career in music journalism as a teenager and became a rock critic for Svenska Dagbladet while nineteen years old. She wrote the Swedish translations of Keith Richards' autobiography Life and Ozzy Osbourne's autobiography I Am Ozzy.

== Music career ==
In 2007, Olsson co-founded the metal/punk band Sonic Ritual with Henrik Palm. The band was active in the underground scene and released several records between 2007 and 2010. Sonic Ritual has been on indefinite hold since Palm joined Swedish heavy metal band In Solitude in 2010.

In 2012, she moved to Berlin and founded the heavy metal band The Oath, as the principal songwriter and guitarist. The group toured with Ghost in 2013 and released a self-titled album via Rise Above Records in 2014.

In 2014, Olsson joined the Finnish post-punk band Beastmilk as a second guitarist, and toured with the band. The group later went through a line-up and name change to Grave Pleasures. She co-wrote the album Dreamcrash, together with singer Mat McNerney. The album was engineered by Tom Dalgety and released by Sony in 2015.

Olsson's solo album Hunger officially released in September, 2023.

== Style and influences ==
Olsson is noted for a unique performance and writing style, described as a mix of noise rock, heavy metal, post-punk, and alternative rock. Bandcamp described her as "one of the most distinctive voices in heavy music".

Juho Vanhanen and Oranssi Pazuzu of Grave Pleasures described her playing as "beautiful and melodic but with spiders crawling underneath". Metal Injection said Olsson "has a very direct, almost proudly straightforward guitar style", while other critics called her guitar style "jarring" and "disgruntled". Brooklyn Vegan wrote that Maggot Heart was "metal-friendly but not really metal. It's dark and catchy and swaggering and kinda finds the middle ground between Blue Oyster Cult and early Siouxsie and the Banshees." CVLT Nation compared the band to "Killing Joke meets L7 with the twisted melodies of Voivod". Mario Rubalcaba chose Maggot Heart's debut album Dusk to Dusk as his favorite album of 2018 in Revolver, noting: "Some call it post-punk, but I think that is still too narrow a scope to trap it in. It has those elements, but also a vibe of more say the attitude of The Stooges or Motörhead, but able to incorporate tasteful and melodic structures and still groove plenty, as well."

In an interview, Olsson said: "Minimalism is something I really treasure in the sense that you only really need one good riff or melody to make a great song. I think songwriting also is something that is lost in the heavy music scene at times – bands seem more concerned with a style or atmosphere, rather than quality songwriting."

Lyrically, Olsson has cited Audrey Lorde, Patti Smith, and Chris Kraus as influences. She is a rap music fan, including Mobb Deep. Some of her favourite albums include Sabotage by Black Sabbath, Never Mind The Bollocks by The Sex Pistols, Raw Power by The Stooges, Dimension Hatross by Voivod, Scratch Acid by Scratch Acid, Harvest Moon by Neil Young, Secret Treaties by Blue Öyster Cult, Push the Sky Away by Nick Cave & The Bad Seeds, Feel the Darkness by Poison Idea, Miami by The Gun Club, and Enter the Wu-Tang by the Wu-Tang Clan.

=== Equipment ===
Olsson plays on a Hagström electric guitar from the 1970s.
