= Obliterator (disambiguation) =

Obliterator is a 1988 computer game.

Obliterator may also refer to:

- Obliterator (Dune), a type of weapon in Frank Herbert's fictional Dune universe
- Obliterator (comics), a Marvel Comics supervillain
- "Obliterator", a song on the 1997 album Through Times of War by Keep of Kalessin
