= Reclaim (EP) =

EP by Keep of Kalessin
- Released: ^{NA} 6 December 2003^{EU} 15 January 2004
- Recorded: 2003
- Genre: Black metal
- Length: 27:01
- Label: FaceFront
- Producer: Obsidian C.

Keep of Kalessin chronology
Agnen: A Journey Through the Dark (1999)	Reclaim (2003)	Armada (2006)

Professional ratings
Review scores
Source	Rating
Scream Magazine	5/6
Bergensavisen	4/6
Østlendingen	5/6
Exact	4/6

Reclaim is Keep of Kalessin's first EP. It was released on 6 December 2003 in the United States and in Europe on 15 January 2004 as a mini CD.

Frost of Satyricon said yes when Obsidian C. asked him to do the drumming on this new EP. Touring with Satyricon also made it possible for Obsidian C. to recruit Attila Csihar for the vocals on Reclaim.

== Track listing ==
No.	Title	Length
1.	"Traveller"	1:57
2.	"IX"	5:30
3.	"Come Damnation"	6:48
4.	"Obliterator"	5:05
5.	"Reclaim"	7:41
Total length:		27:01

== Personnel ==
- Arnt "Obsidian C." Ove Grønbech – guitars, bass, synths, lyrics
- Kjetil-Vidar "Frost" Haraldstad – drums
- Attila Csihar – vocals
