= Mat McNerney =

English musician

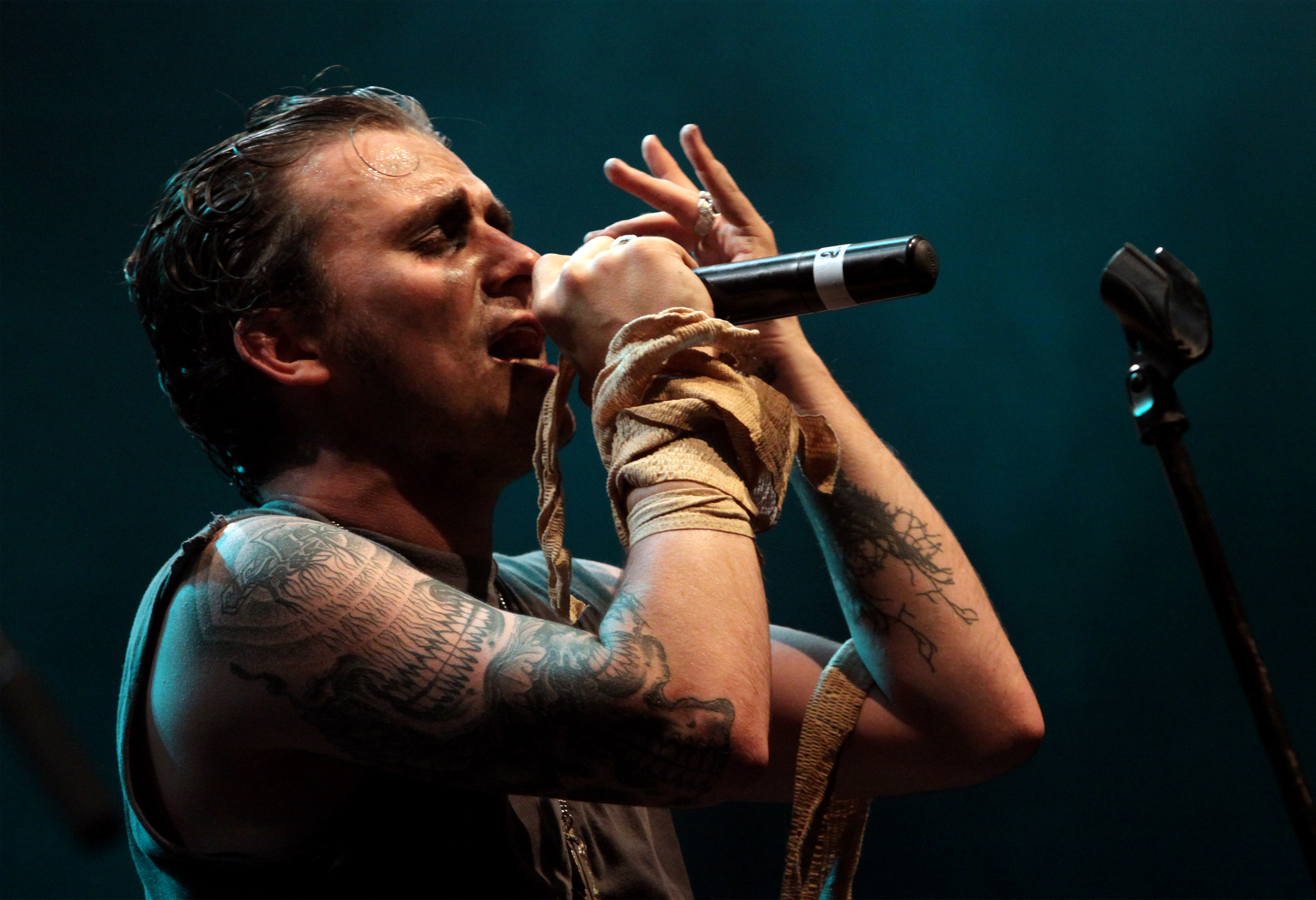
- McNerney performing with Code at Devilstone Open Air in 2009

Background information
- Also known as: Kvohst
- Born: 1978 (age 47–48)
- Genres: Black metal, death metal, folk, rock
- Occupation: Musician
- Instruments: Guitar, vocals

Kvohst (born Mathew Joseph McNerney in 1978) is a British singer, guitarist, songwriter and producer.

== Life and music career ==
Kvohst was born and grew up in Wimbledon, London. He has lived in numerous places including Norway and The Netherlands first he moved to Oslo then moved to Karasjok in Finnmark, and currently resides in Tampere, Finland. He is the guitarist, singer, and songwriter for the band Hexvessel and the lead singer of Grave Pleasures which was formerly known as Beastmilk. McNerney is the former lead vocalist of the Norwegian band Dødheimsgard, and Code.

=== 1990s ===
McNerney started his musical career at the age of 12 singing in a based out of his high school band called Vomitorium. In 1993, Vomitorium released a demo titled Haurium Oscula De Te. The band changed their name to later The Tragedians, and released one demo cassette in 1995 entitled Krull.

=== 2000s ===
In 2002, McNerney went on to form the UK band Void (as Ionman) when they released Posthuman album on Samoth from Emperor's Nocturnal Art label. In the same year in association with Aort, McNerney Co-founded Code and released their first demo in 2002 titled Neurotransmissions: Amplified Thought Chemistry. In 2005, Code signed to Spikefarm Records for Nouveau Gloaming release. Joining Dødheimsgard from Norway in 2004, he wrote lyrics and performed vocals on the album Supervillain Outcast released in 2007 by Moonfog Productions.

In 2008, McNerney has written lyrics for the Norwegian band Virus for their albums The Black Flux and The Agent That Shapes The Desert. In 2009, McNerney nominated for a Norwegian Grammy Award or Spellemannprisen with Code for their album Resplendent Grotesque.

In 2010, McNerney and Johan Snell founded Beastmilk in Helsinki, Finland, the band name changed later to Grave Pleasures in 2013 after Johan leaving and the band split.

In 2012 Hexvessel were nominated for Emma-gaala Award "Finnish Grammy", and nominated for the best underground act at Metal Hammer Golden Gods Awards in 2013.

In 2016 Hexvessel were nominated for Prog Magazine "Anthem" award for "Transparent Eyeball" from When We Are Death, 2016.

== Discography ==
With Vomitorium

- Hauriam Oscula De Te Cassette Demo (1994)

With The Tragedians

- Krull Cassette Demo (1995)

With Void

- Posthuman (2002)

With Code

- Nouveau Gloaming (2005)
- Resplendent Grotesque (2009)

With Dødheimsgard

- Supervillain Outcast (2007)

With Decrepit Spectre

- Coal Black Hearses (2009)

With Gangrenator

- Tales From a Thousand Graves (2010)

With Beastmilk

- White Stains On Black Tape (2010)
- Use Your Deluge (2011)
- Climax (2013)

With Grave Pleasures

- Dreamcrash (2015)
- Motherblood (2017)
- Plagueboys (2023)

With Hexvessel

- Dawnbearer (2011)
- Vainolainen (2011)
- No Holier Temple (2012)
- When We Are Death (2016)
- All Tree (2019)
- Polar Veil (2023)
- Nocturne (2025)

With Carpenter Brut

- Leather Teeth (2018)

with The Deathtrip

- Demon Solar Totem (2019)

with Rope Sect

- Prison of You (2020)
- Flood Flower (2020)
