= Dreamcrash =

Studio album by Grave Pleasures
- Released: 4 September 2015
- Genre: Post-punk
- Label: Columbia, Metal Blade Records
- Producer: Tom Dalgety

Grave Pleasures chronology
Climax (2013)	Dreamcrash (2015)	Motherblood (2017)

Professional ratings
Review scores
Source	Rating
Kerrang!	4/5 stars

Dreamcrash is the second album by Finland-based band Grave Pleasures (formerly known as Beastmilk). It was released in 2015.

== Track listing ==
1. "Utopian Scream" – 03:36
2. "New Hip Moon" – 03:07
3. "Crying Wolves" – 05:07
4. "Futureshock" – 03:13
5. "Crisis" – 04:27
6. "Worn Threads" – 04:06
7. "Taste the Void" – 02:24
8. "Lipstick on Your Tombstone" – 03:44
9. "Girl in a Vortex" – 03:57
10. "Crooked Vein" – 06:08
11. "No Survival" – 03:57

== Personnel ==
- Mat "Kvohst" McNerney – vocals
- Linnéa Olsson – guitar
- Juho Vanhanen – guitar
- Valtteri Arino – bass
- Uno Bruniusson – drums
