= Epistemology (album) =

Studio album by Keep of Kalessin
- Released: 16 February 2015
- Genres: Melodic black metal, melodic death metal
- Length: 52:18
- Labels: Indie, Nuclear Blast
- Producer: Obsidian C.

Keep of Kalessin chronology
Reptilian (2010)	Epistemology (2015)	Katharsis (2023)

Epistemology is the sixth studio album by the Norwegian extreme metal band Keep of Kalessin, released on 16 February 2015 through Indie.

Natalie Humphries of Soundscape Magazine rated the album a 7 out of 10, opining that it "lacks that special something."

== Track listing ==
No.	Title	Length
1.	"Cosmic Revelation"	1:14
2.	"The Spiritual Relief"	9:54
3.	"Dark Divinity"	7:34
4.	"The Grand Design"	7:38
5.	"Necropolis"	7:19
6.	"Universal Core"	3:54
7.	"Introspection"	5:05
8.	"Epistemology"	9:40
9.	"Anima Mundi" (bonus track)	2:03
10.	"Novae Ruptis" (bonus track)	1:48

== Members ==
- Arnt "Obsidian C." Grønbech – bass, guitars, vocals, keyboards
- Robin "Wizziac" Isaksen – bass
- Vegar "Vyl" Larsen – drums
- Attila Csihar – vocals (track 9)
- Jean Michel – artwork
- Obsidian Claw – producer
- Stamos Koliousis – mixing, mastering
