= Sister (In Solitude album) =

Studio album by In Solitude
- Released: October 1, 2013
- Recorded: March 2013 at Studio Cobra in Stockholm
- Genre: Heavy metal
- Length: 46:07
- Label: Metal Blade
- Producer: Martin "Konie" Ehrencrona

In Solitude chronology
The World. The Flesh. The Devil. (2011)	Sister (2013)

Professional ratings
Aggregate scores
Source	Rating
Metacritic	(78/100)
Review scores
Source	Rating
About.com	4/5 stars
Blurt	3/5 stars
Exclaim!	7/10
Kerrang!	4/5 stars
Metal Injection	9/10
Pitchfork	7.1/10
PopMatters	8/10 stars
Sputnik Music	3.7/5

Sister is the third and final album by Swedish heavy metal band In Solitude. This is their second album to be released through Metal Blade Records, having signed with the label in 2010, and was released on 1 October 2013. The album was recorded at Studio Cobra in Stockholm in March 2013 and was produced and mixed by Martin "Konie" Ehrencrona.

== Reception ==
The album averaged 78/100 on Metacritic which indicates "generally favorable reviews". Andy O'Connor, writing for Pitchfork, gave the album 7.1/10 and was largely positive about the album. In particular, he praised the song "Pallid Hands", writing that the song "brings a romanticism that hasn't been seen in metal in a while, and is the group's finest song to date. It recalls 70s Judas Priest's more bittersweet moments, a casualty of the group's success in the 80s, or a more serious stab at April Wine's 'Sign of the Gypsy Queen'. In Solitude are a young band—Palm is the oldest member at 26—and for them to craft a song filled with weariness and whiskey-afflicted love is a stroke of 'Old Man'-like brilliance." However, he was critical of the closing track, writing that "'Inmost Nigredo' clocks in at just over eight minutes, as opposed to the nearly 14 minutes of 'On Burning Paths', but it still languishes without bombast. This is an unfortunate betrayal of their songwriting prowess, which the album thrives on."

Erik Highter of PopMatters was positive about the album, awarding it an 8/10 and concluding that "Sister is the sound of a band growing and coming into their own, drawing on disparate influences inside and outside the genre. They've taken Fate into their own hands and in the process made one of the best records of the year." Natalie Walschots of Exclaim! was likewise positive about the album, awarding it 7/10, writing that "Dark and syrupy in tone, with just the right amount of haze, as if from sacred smoke, Sister is a fine addition to the witchy, ritualistic hard rock that's leaving an ever-darker mark on aggressive music."

=== Accolades ===
Publication	Country	Accolade	Rank
Decibel	US	Top 40 Extreme Albums of 2013	2
NPR	US	10 Favorite Metal Albums of 2013	-
NPR	US	50 Favorite Albums of 2013	-
Pitchfork	US	Top 40 Metal Albums of 2013	15
Rolling Stone	US	20 Best Metal Albums of 2013	4

== Track listing ==
No.	Title	Length
1.	"He Comes"	3:19
2.	"Death Knows Where"	4:37
3.	"A Buried Sun"	7:22
4.	"Pallid Hands"	5:52
5.	"Lavender"	4:53
6.	"Sister"	5:47
7.	"Horses in the Ground"	6:08
8.	"Inmost Nigredo"	8:06

== Personnel ==
=== In Solitude ===
- Pelle Åhman – lead vocals
- Niklas Lindström – guitars
- Henrik Palm- guitars
- Gottfrid Åhman – bass
- Uno Bruniusson – drums

=== Additional ===
- Martin "Konie" Ehrencrona – producer
- Pelle Forsberg of Watain – guest guitar solo on "Inmost Nigredo"
- Jarboe of Swans – guest vocals on "Horses in the Ground"
