= Climax (Beastmilk album) =

Studio album by Beastmilk
- Released: 29 November 2013
- Recorded: June 2013
- Studio: GodCity Studio
- Genre: Post-punk
- Length: 38:34
- Label: Svart
- Producer: Kurt Ballou

Beastmilk chronology
Climax (2013)	Dreamcrash (2015)

Professional ratings
Review scores
Source	Rating
Classic Rock	9/10 stars

Climax is the debut album by Finland-based band Beastmilk, released in 2013.

== Track listing ==
1. "Death Reflects Us" – 2:49
2. "The Wind Blows Through Their Skulls" – 2:24
3. "Genocidal Crush" – 3:43
4. "You Are Now Under Our Control" – 3:34
5. "Ghosts Out of Focus" – 5:04
6. "Nuclear Winter" – 3:37
7. "Fear Your Mind" – 3:22
8. "Love in a Cold World" – 3:45
9. "Surf the Apocalypse" – 4:22
10. "Strange Attractors" – 5:54

== Personnel ==
- Kvohst – vocals
- Goatspeed – guitar
- Arino – bass
- Paile – drums
