= Grave Pleasures =

Finnish post-punk band

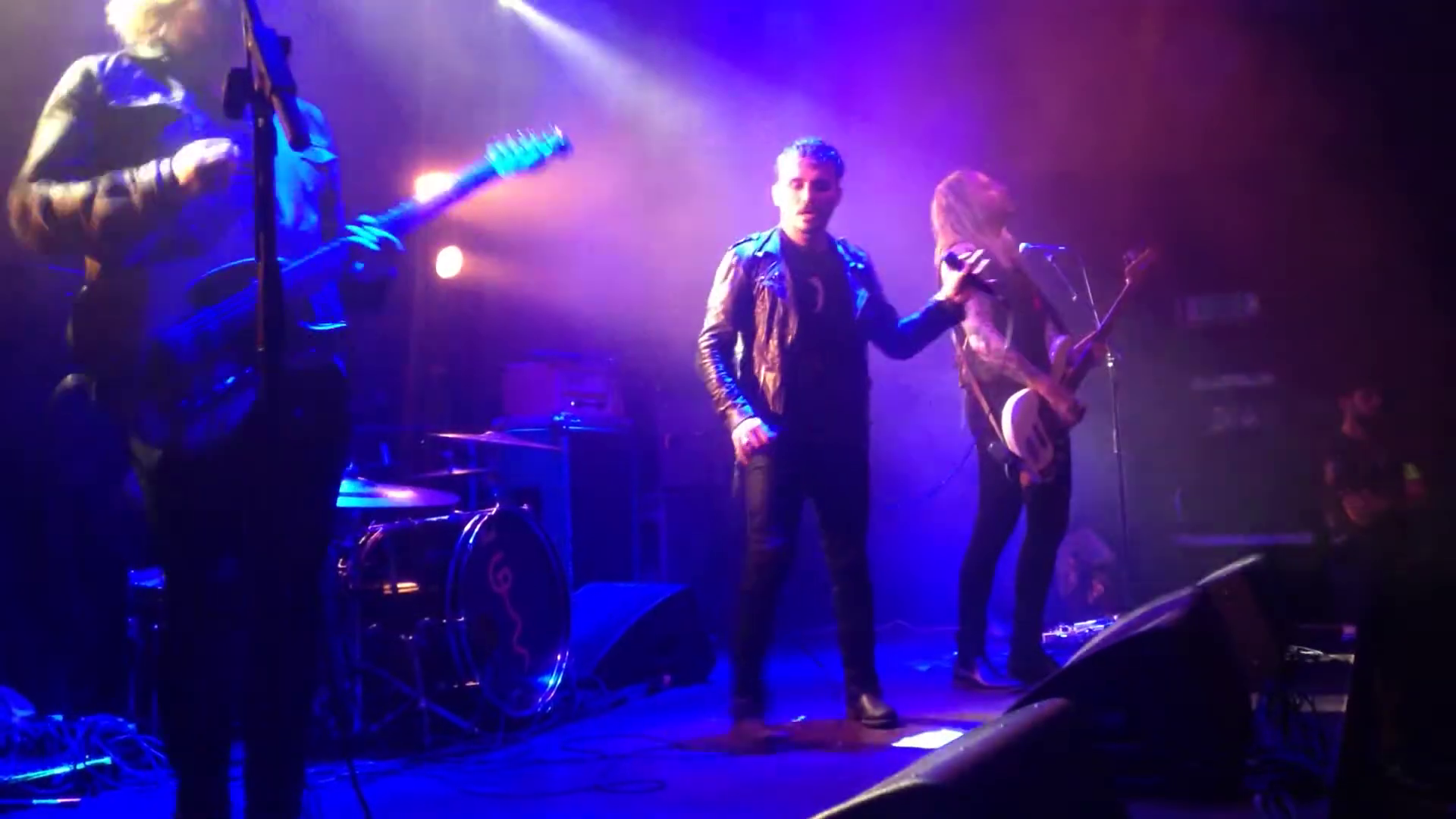
- Grave Pleasures performing in 2018

Background information
- Also known as: Beastmilk (2010–2015)
- Origin: Helsinki, Finland
- Genres: Post-punk; gothic rock; deathrock
- Years active: 2010–present
- Labels: Columbia, Metal Blade, Svart, Magic Bullet
- Members: Mat McNerney; Valtteri Arino; Juho Vanhanen; Aleksi Kiiskilä; Rainer Tuomikanto
- Past members: Johan Snell; Dimitri Paile; Linnéa Olsson; Uno Bruniusson
- Website: gravepleasures.com

Grave Pleasures is a Finnish post-punk band from Helsinki. Formed in 2010, Grave Pleasure's previous incarnation, Beastmilk, released a demo followed by an EP, and later debut full-length Climax. Members Mat McNerney and Valtteri Arino continued the band in 2015 as Grave Pleasures, following Johan Snell and Paile's departure with the group. With new members, Grave Pleasures released Dreamcrash months later.

== History ==
=== Formation as Beastmilk ===
Beastmilk was founded in 2010 by Mat McNerney, Johan Snell, Valtteri Arino and Paile in Helsinki. The band name came about because McNerney and Snell read White Stains by Aleister Crowley, and wanted "to have a dialogue about what it means to be a man and go through all these male emotions... It was sort of a conversation on what is your father's milk, what is your mother's milk and so on." It also came out of Snell's interest in liquids and how it affects society. The band later self-released a demo, White Stains on Black Tape, in the same year. The demo was well received including from musicians Fenriz of Darkthrone and Nate Newton of Converge.

On 2 April 2012, Beastmilk released an EP Use Your Deluge under Finnish label Svart Records. In June 2013, the band went to Salem, Massachusetts to record their debut full-length Climax, with Converge guitarist Kurt Ballou at his own recording studio GodCity Studio. Climax was released on 29 November 2013, under the Magic Bullet Records label.

=== Name change with new lineup ===
Following the positive reception of Climax, Sony was interested in offering Beastmilk to join the label under Columbia Records. At the time of the offer, there were tensions between Snell and the rest of Beastmilk. Former The Oath guitarist Linnéa Olsson joined Beastmilk in August 2015, shortly after the departure of drummer Paile, and toured with the band as their new second guitarist in October 2015. In 2015 the group moved on without Snell, leaving McNerney and Arino the original members of the band. McNerney and Arino took the name Grave Pleasures. The band recruited former In Solitude member Uno Bruniusson on drums and Oranssi Pazuzu's Juho Vanhanen as session guitarist. As a five-piece, including Vanhanen, Grave Pleasures recorded Dreamcrash in May 2015 with producer Tom Dalgety. Dreamcrash released on 4 September 2015, in Finland, Germany, Switzerland and Austria and 2 October in the United Kingdom and France by Columbia. Metal Blade Records handled the North American release of Dreamcrash for its 13 November 2015 release.

== Members ==
- Mat "Kvohst" McNerney – vocals
- Valtteri Arino – bass
- Juho Vanhanen – guitars
- Aleksi Kiiskilä – guitars
- Rainer Tuomikanto – drums

=== Past members ===
- Johan "Goatspeed" Snell – guitars
- Dimitri Paile – drums
- Linnéa Olsson – guitars
- Uno Bruniusson – drums

== Discography ==
- Climax (2013) (as Beastmilk)
- Dreamcrash (2015)
- Funeral Party (2017; EP)
- Motherblood (2017)
- Doomsday Roadburn (2019)
- Plagueboys (2023)
