= Keep of Kalessin =

Norwegian metal band

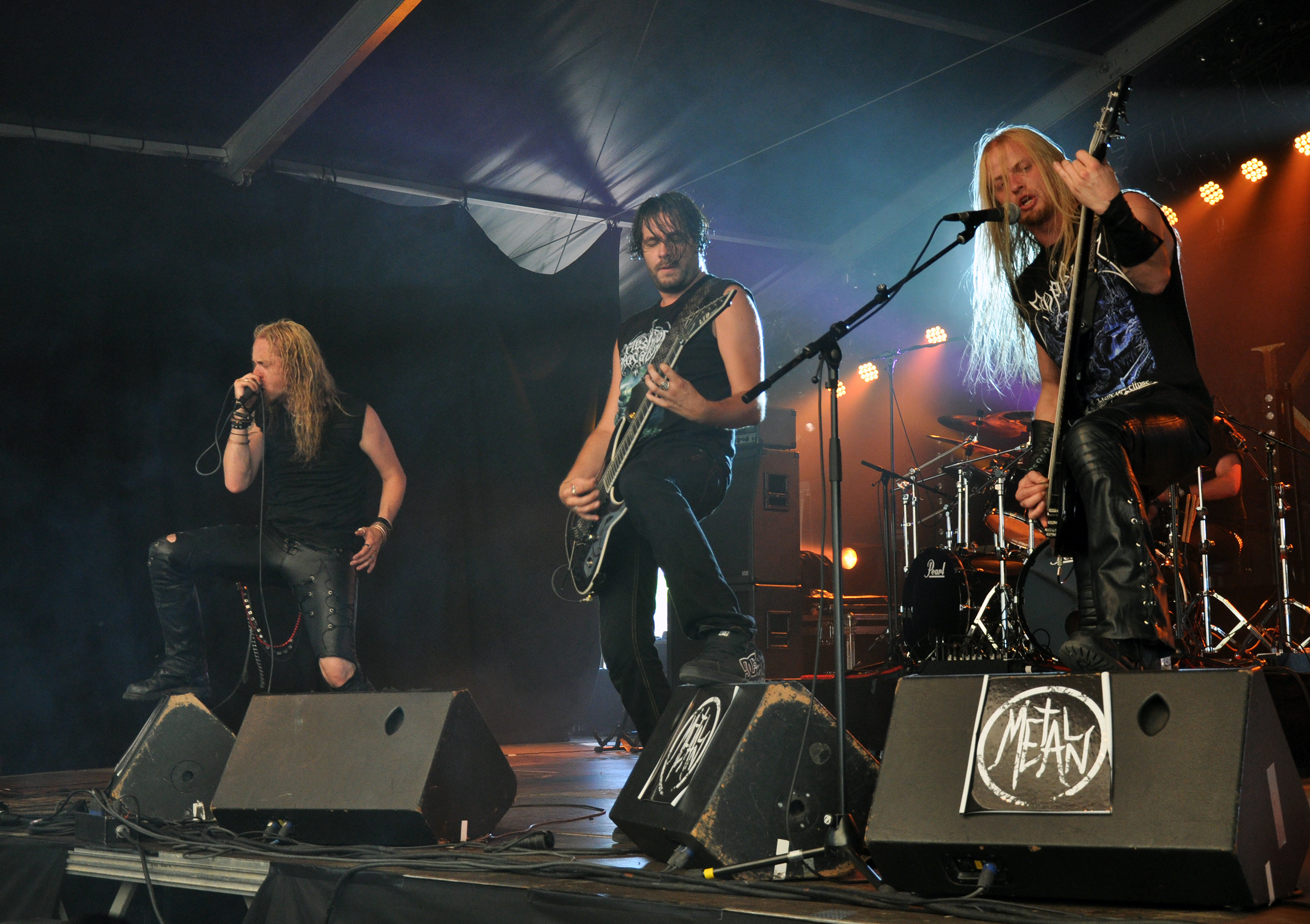
- Keep of Kalessin performing in 2011

Background information
- Origin: Trondheim, Norway
- Genres: Melodic black metal Melodic death metal Black metal (early)
- Years active: 1993–2000, 2003, 2005–present
- Labels: Nuclear Blast, Candlelight, Tabu, Indie
- Members: Obsidian C. Wizziac; Nechtan
- Past members: See below

Keep of Kalessin is a Norwegian extreme metal band from Trondheim, formed in 1993. The group's early lineup consisted of Ghash on vocals, Obsidian C. (the group founder) on guitars and keyboards, Warach on bass, and Vyl on drums. They released two albums under this lineup: Through Times of War in 1997, and Agnen: A Journey Through the Dark in 1999, before splitting up. Obsidian C. then toured with Satyricon, but revived the Keep of Kalessin name for a 2003 EP, Reclaim. In 2006, he reconstituted the group with a new lineup and released a third full-length, Armada. They toured with Behemoth and Dimmu Borgir early in 2008. Their fourth album Kolossus was released on 6 June 2008. They take their name from Ursula K. Le Guin's Earthsea series of books, where Kalessin is the name of the arch-dragon who is the bearer of the Earthsea world. Keep of Kalessin was nominated for a Spellemannprisen in the metal category in 2008.

== History ==
Keep of Kalessin is well known for their melodic sound and virtuosic playing ability, while still maintaining a level of harshness that one traditionally expects from black metal bands. In contrast to traditional Norwegian black metal, Keep of Kalessin also makes use of other instruments like the piano, keyboards and synthesizers. They started experimenting with a new sound which gave Keep of Kalessin its new character after Obsidian C. recruited the new band members Thebon, Wizziac and Vyl for their album Armada in 2006, the follow-up after the Reclaim EP in 2003. Before Reclaim, the band had a much darker and colder character because of the different line-up they had earlier in their career. The line-up split in 2000, though Obsidian C. still wanted to make something of the band and the split-up was not the end of the band yet. He wanted to give Keep of Kalessin a unique character and develop its music, and improve himself too as a musician and lyrics writer, but the band still needed a drummer who could keep up with his riffing and he was unable find one in Trondheim. After nearly 3 years, the band Satyricon was in the need of a guitarist and Obsidian C. participated in the auditions and "played the ass off" some other 30 guitarists who also had applied for the job. He made it to the band and came in contact with Satyricon's drummer Frost.

Obsidian C. did not give up on Keep of Kalessin and as soon as Frost heard its material, without hesitation, he immediately said yes when Obsidian C. asked him to do the drumming on his new EP. As the band's new guitarist, Obsidian C. also toured with the band and this made it possible to recruit Attila Csihar for his EP to do the vocals. This new line-up recorded Keep of Kalessin's new EP Reclaim and skyrocketed the band into the elite black metal scene of Norway. But the line-up did not last and fell apart because of the distances between the band members. Still, this would not stop Obsidian C. and he was increasingly determined to bring Keep of Kalessin to the masses. As part of Satyricon he toured a lot with the band and understood that touring is a must to promote a band. Not much later he teamed up again with Vyl, who was a part of the band before the breakup in 2000. Now the band still needed a vocalist and preferably a bassist as well. This is when Thebon (vocals) and Wizziac (bass guitar) became part of the band.

Together with Torstein Parelius – the lyric writer from their EP Reclaim – the new line-up spent 2 years preparing to record their next album entitled Armada. This elevated the band to a higher place in the elite black metal scene of Norway and the band finally had a line-up which could last and made the band even more promising than before.

This same line-up recorded in 2007 the new album Kolossus, released in the summer of 2008, demonstrating the band improved their sound after the well received and highly acclaimed release Armada in 2006 which even got some good attention from the more mainstream media in Norway. This resulted in a nomination for the Spellemannprisen in the metal category in 2008. On Kolossus they started to experiment more with different instruments and the band indeed created a unique character for Keep of Kalessin.

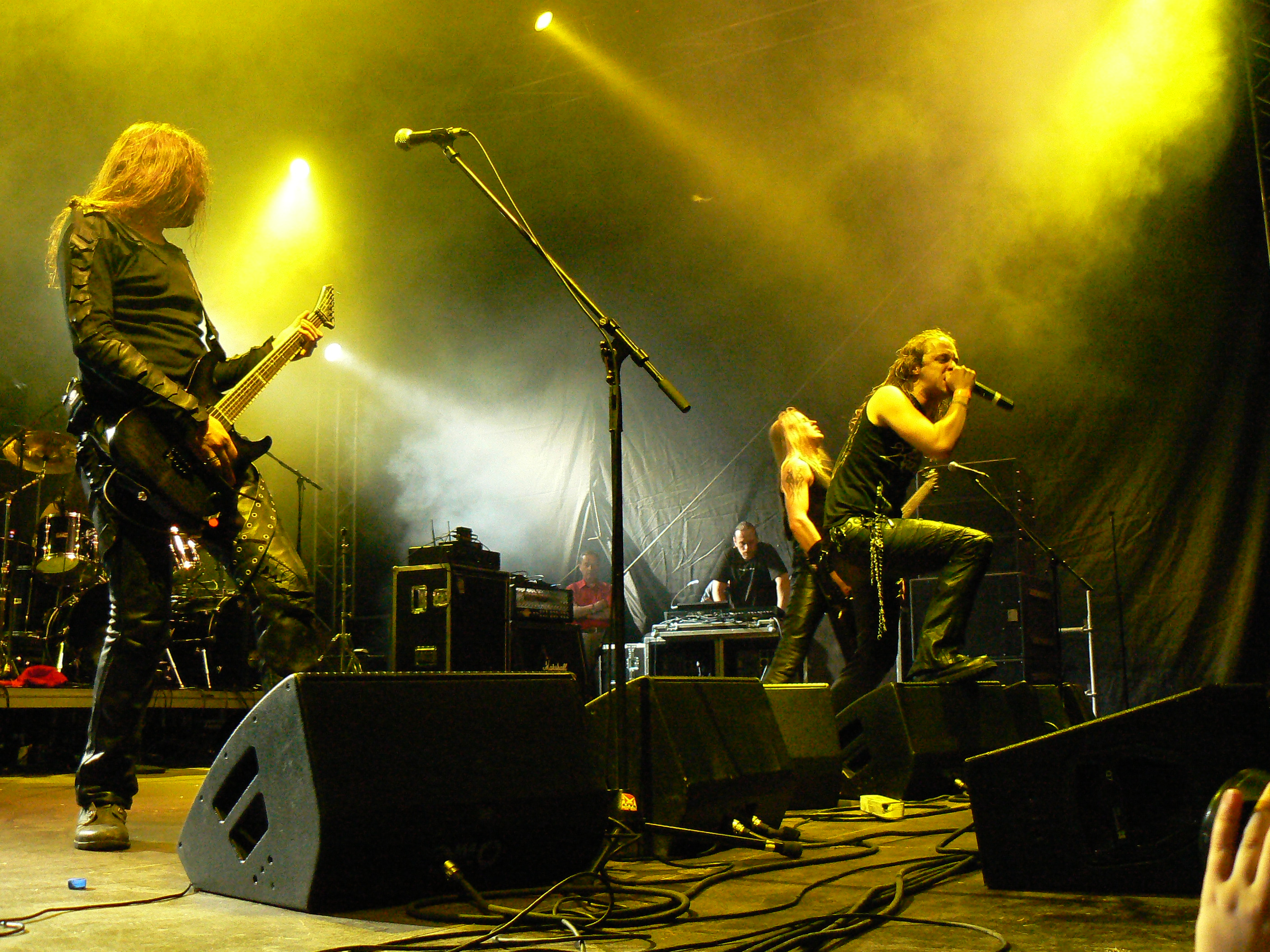
Keep of Kalessin at Devilstone Open Air 2009

In 2010, Keep of Kalessin entered a song in the Melodi Grand Prix, the annual competition to select Norway's entry in the Eurovision Song Contest, which was hosted by the country due to its victory in the 2009 contest, becoming the first heavy metal band to vie in the competition. The band performed their new song, "The Dragontower", in the first of 3 semi-final rounds and advanced to the Gold Final round, where the band finished in 3rd place overall through a combined viewer and jury vote.

Obsidian C. announced in the Studio Report 4 video of Kolossus that they're already working on some new songs for the next album.

I think we'll have maybe one week of vacation after these recording sessions are done before we start recording the next album again. We have written songs for the new album, so hopefully the fans won't need to wait more than a year between Kolossus and the next one.

— Obsidian C, http://www.keepofkalessin.no/

The band released its fifth album, "Reptilian," on 10 May 2010. It demonstrated a slight deviation from the black metal influenced sound of their previous music in favor of a truer extreme metal sound. The album received generally positive reviews and peaked at number 2 on the Norwegian charts. "Reptilian" is also the last album to feature Thebon on vocals. After touring for "Reptilian," Thebon was fired from the band and took over lead vocal duties for the thrash band Hellish Outcast.

With Thebon no longer in the band, Obsidian C. took over lead vocal duties. The band's first release as a three-piece line up was the "Introspection" EP. It contained two new songs and an "extreme" remake of the song "The Dragontower" from "Reptilian." A music video was made for the track "Introspection." The band announced that they were working on a full-length album, titled "Epistemology." A cover art contest was held, with hundreds of submissions and a voting page set up on the band's Facebook profile. Brazilian artist Jean Michel was declared the winner at the end, and the album was released on 16 February 2015.

On 25 December 2022, Keep of Kalessin announced their upcoming album Katharsis, to be premiered in full live on the 70000 Tons of Metal festival cruise, ahead of the full release on 24 March 2023. The title track was released as the first single on 28 February 2023, to the Back on Black Records' YouTube channel, with streaming services following on 3 March 2023.

== Musical style and legacy ==
According to Eduardo Rivadavia of AllMusic, "Keep of Kalessin are a pioneering force in extreme metal, helping to define the metal subgenre with their fusion of stunning technical playing with an intensity at the same level as black metal's more powerful acts."

== Band members ==
=== Current members ===
- Arnt "Obsidian C." Grønbech – guitars, keyboards (1995–2000, 2003–present), lead vocals (2013–present), bass (1995, 2003–2005)
- Robin "Wizziac" Isaksen – bass (2005–present)
- Wanja "Nechtan" Gröger – drums (2019–present)

Live members

- Roger Isaksen - guitars (2019–present)

=== Former members ===
- Øyvind A. "Warach" Winther – bass (1995–2000)
- Vegar "Vyl" Larsen – drums (1995–2000, 2004–2016)
- Torbjørn "Thebon" Schei – vocals (2004–2013)
- Magnus "Ghâsh" Hjertaas – vocals (1995–2000)
- Attila Csihar – vocals (2003–2004)
- Kjetil-Vidar "Frost" Haraldstad – drums (2003–2004)
- Oli Beaudoin – drums (session member, 2011)

== Discography ==
=== Studio releases ===
- Through Times of War (1997)
- Agnen: A Journey Through the Dark (1999)
- Armada (2006)
- Kolossus (2008)
- Reptilian (2010)
- Epistemology (2015)
- Katharsis (2023)

=== Extended plays ===
- Reclaim (2003)
- Introspection (2013)
- Heaven of Sin (2016)

=== Demos ===
- Skygger av Sorg (1996)
