= Reptilian (album) =

Studio album by Keep of Kalessin
- Released: 10 May 2010
- Recorded: November – December 2009 at Morningstar Studio in Trondheim, Norway
- Genre: Symphonic black metal, melodic death metal
- Length: 57:01
- Label: Indie, Nuclear Blast
- Producer: Obsidian C.

Keep of Kalessin chronology
Kolossus (2008)	Reptilian (2010)	Epistemology (2015)

Professional ratings
Review scores
Source	Rating
Allmusic	4/5 stars

Reptilian is the fifth studio album by the Norwegian extreme metal band Keep of Kalessin, released on 10 May 2010 in Europe and on 8 June 2010 in North America through Nuclear Blast. The album peaked at number two on the Norwegian record chart, VG-lista. This would be the last album with Torbjørn "Thebon" Schei on vocals before he was fired in 2013.

== Track listing ==
No.	Title	Length
1.	"Dragon Iconography"	7:30
2.	"The Awakening"	8:19
3.	"Judgement"	5:10
4.	"The Dragontower"	4:43
5.	"Leaving the Mortal Flesh"	4:25
6.	"Dark as Moonless Night"	5:50
7.	"The Divine Land"	6:47
8.	"Reptilian Majesty"	14:13
Total length:		56:57

== Members ==
- Arnt "Obsidian C." Grønbech - guitars, keyboards, backing vocals
- Torbjørn "Thebon" Schei - lead vocals
- Robin "Wizziac" Isaksen - bass, backing vocals
- Vegar "Vyl" Larsen - drums
- The Dragonchoir - choir, backing vocals
- Daniel Bergstrand - producer, mixer

== Charts ==
Chart (2010)	Peak position
Norwegian Albums Chart	2
