= Hellish Outcast =

Norwegian death/thrash metal band

- Origin: Bergen, Norway
- Genres: Death metal, thrash metal, extreme metal
- Years active: 2001 - present
- Labels: Listenable Records, Transcend Music
- Members: Thebon; Max Morbid; Alkolust; Martin Legreid
- Website: Hellish Outcast on MySpace

Hellish Outcast is a death / thrash metal band from Bergen, Norway, founded in 2001.

== History ==
Hellish Outcast was formed in 2001 in Bergen, Norway, originally as a trio by guitarist Martin Legreid, bassist Mads Mowinckel (Breed) and drummer Mads Lilletvedt (Solstorm, ex Byfrost).

They quickly gained a reputation as one of the most extreme in the underground scene in their city. The band was first introduced as one of the rising stars of the underground, when they appeared on a CD from Terrorizer Magazine in March 2008. Hellish Outcast debuted with the independent release of the EP Raping - Killing - Murder also in 2008.

In 2010, singer Torbjørn Schei (Thebon, ex-Keep of Kalessin) joined the ranks of Hellish Outcast, who offered the band a sharper sound and a new more aggressive approach to their musical style.

In 2011, the band participated in the European festivals Devilstone Open Air in Anykščiai, Lithuania on July 15, and Bloodstock Open Air in Walton-on-Trent, England on August 14.

In 2012, Hellish Outcast released their first album, Your God Will Bleed, on April 1, 2012 by themselves. The album was promoted with their first two music videos: "Your God Will Bleed" and "Face Forced Down".

The second album called Stay of Execution, was released under Listenable Records on January 20, 2015 and was recorded in Grieghallen Studios in Bergen and Russell 'Parlour Studios in the UK (Napalm Death, Evile, Dimmu Borgir). The album has a better production, with a sound more elaborate and progressive style. The album was preceded by the music video of the song "Torment".

== Members ==
- Torbjørn Schei (Thebon) - vocals (2010–present)
- Mads Mowinckel (Max Morbid) - bass
- Mads Lilletvedt (Alkolust) - drums
- Martin Legreid - guitars and vocals

== Discography ==
- Their Release from Soil You (Demo) - 2006
- Raping - Killing - Murder (EP) - 2008
- Your God Will Bleed (Full-length) - 2012
- Stay of Execution (Full-length) - 2015

== Music videos ==
- "Face Forced Down" - 2011
- "Your God Will Bleed" - 2012
- "Djinn" - 2012
- "Torment" - 2014
