= Kolossus =

Studio album by Keep of Kalessin
- Released: June 6, 2008
- Recorded: 2007–2008
- Genres: Melodic black metal Melodic death metal
- Length: 54:21
- Labels: Nuclear Blast, Tabu

Keep of Kalessin chronology
Armada (2006)	Kolossus (2008)	Reptilian (2010)

Professional ratings
Review scores
Source	Rating
AllMusic	4/5 stars
Rock Hard	9/10
Chronicles of Chaos	9/10
Scream Magazine	5/6

Kolossus is Keep of Kalessin's fourth studio album. It was released on June 6, 2008, in Europe and on June 10 in the U.S. A limited edition deluxe digipak was released under Indie Recordings which contains a bonus DVD including interviews, behind-the-scenes material, the making of Kolossus, the live performance Come Damnation, Live in Paris 2006 and the Kolossus teaser.

== Track listing ==
No.	Title	Length
1.	"Origin"	2:28
2.	"A New Empire's Birth"	5:50
3.	"Against the Gods"	8:46
4.	"The Rising Sign"	7:27
5.	"Warmonger"	5:20
6.	"Escape the Union"	7:49
7.	"The Mark of Power"	4:55
8.	"Kolossus"	7:15
9.	"Ascendant"	4:31
Total length:		54:21

=== Notes ===
1. A music video for the song Ascendant was made.

== Personnel ==
- Arnt "Obsidian C." Ove Grønbech - guitars, synthesizers
- Torbjørn "Thebon" Schei - lead vocals
- Robin "Wizziac" Isaksen - bass
- Vegar "Vyl" Larsen - drums
- Håkon-Marius Pettersen - piano, keyboards
- Daniel Elide - percussion

== Charts ==
Chart (2008)	Peak position
Norwegian Albums Chart	19
