= Katharsis (Keep of Kalessin album) =

Studio album by Keep of Kalessin
- Released: 24 March 2023
- Genre: Melodic black metal, symphonic black metal
- Length: 48:27
- Label: Back on Black

Keep of Kalessin chronology
Epistemology (2015)	Katharsis (2023)

Katharsis is the seventh studio album by the Norwegian black metal band Keep of Kalessin, released in 2023 through Back on Black Records.

The album featured a new drummer, German Wanja Gröger, replacing longtime member Vegar Larsen.

== Reception ==
The album got a perfect 10 score from Metal.de, with the outlet announcing it as a candidate for album of the year. The songwriting was sophistical, with the band reaching an "absolute peak" with "sharp" and intense songs.

Rock Hard gave 8 points, whereas Metal Hammer Germany gave 4 out of 7. The reviewer was a bit skeptical to "them going all in on every song in terms of bombast, crescendos, and chest-pounding intensity". Additionally, the lyrics were "awful", though Katharsis had redeeming qualities as "a lot of fun in the best metal sense, and the band members are all highly skilled on their instruments". Powermetal.de similarly stated that Katharsis showcased Keep of Kalessin in their familiar style of bombastic extreme metal. The reviewer also found "a healthy dose of catchiness" and even "a hit!" in the track "Hellride". These were positive traits, though "a certain stagnation sets in" a bit into the album, with the songs beginning to sound "interchangeable". The reviewer therefore found "the spark of enthusiasm" somewhat lacking, rating the album as a 7 out of 10.

In the Nordic countries, Katharsis got some mediocre reviews, such as 5 out of 10 from Heavymetal.dk and 3 out of 5 from Inferno.fi.

== Track listing ==
No.	Title	Length
1.	"Katharsis"	4:32
2.	"Hellride"	3:54
3.	"The Omni"	7:11
4.	"War of the Wyrm"	3:52
5.	"From the Stars and Beyond"	3:52
6.	"Journey's End"	5:12
7.	"The Obsidian Expanse"	10:08
8.	"Throne of Execration"	8:08
9.	"The Eternal Swarm (Outro)"	1:38
