= Agnen: A Journey Through the Dark =

Studio album by Keep of Kalessin
- Released: October 15, 1999
- Recorded: 1999; Brygga studio, Trondheim
- Genre: Black metal
- Length: 50:51
- Label: Avantgarde Music
- Producer: Self-released

Keep of Kalessin chronology
Through Times of War (1997)	Agnen: A Journey Through the Dark (1999)	Armada (2006)

Agnen: A Journey Through the Dark is Keep of Kalessin's second studio album.

Avantgarde Music, the record label, mixed the running order of the tracks 1, 4 and 6 on the album (the rest is correct). There are two different versions of this album, with different running orders. The first edition has track 1 Pain Humanised, track 4 Dryland and track 6 Dragonlord. The second edition (this version is as the band intended it) has track 1 Dryland, track 4 Dragonlord and track 6 Pain Humanised.

Both of these are different from what it says on the back of the CD-case. On the back of the CD-case, the running order is as the track listing shows below.

== Track listing ==
No.	Title	Length
1.	"Dragonlord"	5:42
2.	"As Mist Lay Silent Beneath"	5:38
3.	"I Deny"	5:03
4.	"Pain Humanised"	4:31
5.	"Orb of Man"	5:49
6.	"Dryland"	5:17
7.	"Towards I Roam"	7:17
8.	"Agnen"	11:34
Total length:		50:51

== Credits ==
- Arnt "Obsidian C." Grønbech – guitars, synths
- Ghâsh – Vocals
- Warach (Øyvind A.Winther) – Bass
- Vegar "Vyl" Larsen – drums
