= Soundarcade =

- Origin: Riga, Latvia
- Genres: Progressive rock, post-rock, post-metal, heavy metal
- Years active: 2002–present
- Labels: Melo
- Members: Martins Abols; Lauris Abele; Raitis Abele; Janis Zale; Gints Spole; Ingus Kempaus

Soundarcade is a Latvian progressive rock, post-metal band. The band was formed in 2002 in Riga.

Soundarcade's music features influences ranging from Latvian folk music to spaghetti westerns, and structures of progressive rock music. Raw sound is provided by dark, swirling guitars, angry drumming, dissonant, howling violin and pulsing bass.

The band released its debut album, 12 Songs of the Jackalope, through the independent Latvian label Melo Records”and is now working on new material. Soundarcade represent Latvian music with live performances that are always supplemented by custom-made visuals.

== Discography ==
=== Studio albums ===
- 12 Songs of the Jackalope (2006)
- Daughters of Molestia (2009)
- Moving the Great Hadron (2012)

== Current members ==
- Martins Abols – vocals
- Lauris Abele – guitar
- Raitis Abele – guitar, mandolin
- Janis Zale – bass
- Gints Spole – drums
- Ingus Kempaus - violin
