= Code (band) =

British musical group

- Origin: Surrey (England)
- Genres: Black metal, avant-garde metal, post-progressive (recently)
- Years active: 2002–present
- Labels: Spikefarm, Agonia Records
- Members: Aort; Andras; Lordt; Syhr; Wacian; Live members: Aort; Andras; Lordt; Syhr; Wacian
- Past members: AiwarikiaR; Vyttra; Adrian Erlandsson; Kvohst; Vicotnik; Alsvid

Code (stylised < c o d e > or < C O D E >) are an English black metal band that formed in 2002.

== History ==
The band formed out of Aort's solo project Seasonal Code with which he had released three demos between 1998 and 2001. The band's founding members were Aort and Kvohst (Mat McNerney). The original line-up consisted of Aort on guitars, Cthonian on vocals and Kvohst from the bands Void and Dødheimsgard on vocals. The band released their first demo, entitled Neurotransmissions: Amplified Thought Chemistry, on 15 March 2002 with music written by Aort and all lyrics by Kvohst. Before they recorded their debut album, Cthonian departed the band and they were joined by Viper a.k.a. Vicotnik from the bands Ved Buens Ende and Dødheimsgard on bass guitar. Vyttra joined on session guitar and AiwarikiaR, former drummer of Ulver, joined on drums. Aort wrote all of the music and Kvohst co-wrote the lyrics with an English writer called Andrew Nicol for the next two studio albums. The band was eventually signed to Spikefarm Records, an imprint record label of Spinefarm Records. Through Spikefarm, they released their first full-length, entitled Nouveau Gloaming on 13 June 2005. Kvohst, Vyttra and AiwarikiaR had all left the band for unspecified reasons in late 2006. After the album's release Kvohst went on to replace the departed Aldrahn on vocals in Dødheimsgard to record the album Supervillain Outcast in 2007. It was announced that ICS Vortex (of Arcturus, Dimmu Borgir, and Lamented Souls) had been in talks to be recruited as the vocalist of the band but in the end he never joined the band nor wrote, performed or rehearsed with them. In September 2008, the band announced that they would not be working with Vortex after all and that Kvohst had returned to do the vocals on the new album. On 4. November 2008 the title for the new album was announced: Resplendent Grotesque. The second album featured the original core lineup of Kvohst, Aort and Vicotnik and the drums were performed by Adrian Erlandsson from At The Gates and ex-Cradle Of Filth.

In 2011, Kvohst split from the band in order to concentrate on his own musical project Hexvessel and moved to Finland. Aort gathered a new lineup, consisting of Andras, Lordt, Syhr and Wacian, and began working on a new album, Augur Nox which was released by Agonia Records in November 2013, as well as by Aort's own label, Haintic.

== Discography ==
Studio albums

- Nouveau Gloaming (2005)
- Resplendent Grotesque (2009)
- Augur Nox (2013)
- Mut (2015)
- Flyblown Prince (2021)

EPs

- Lost Signal (2017)
- Under the Subgleam (2017)

== Members ==
=== Current members ===
- Aort – guitar (2002–)
- Lordt – drums (2010-)
- Syhr – bass (2011-)
- Wacian – vocals (2011-)

=== Former members ===
- Kvohst – vocals (2002–2006, 2008–2011)
- Vicotnik - bass guitar, backing vocals (2002–2010)
- AiwarikiaR – drums (2004–2005)
- Vyttra – guitar (2002–2006)
- Alsvid – drums (2007–2008)
- Andras – guitar (2008–2022)
