= Armada (album) =

Studio album by Keep of Kalessin
- Released: 3 April 2006
- Recorded: 2005–2006
- Genre: Black metal
- Length: 53:46
- Label: Tabu
- Producer: Obsidian C., Rune Stavnesli

Keep of Kalessin chronology
Reclaim (2003)	Armada (2006)	Kolossus (2008)

Professional ratings
Review scores
Source	Rating
Allmusic	3.5/5 stars
Rock Hard	9/10
Chronicles of Chaos	8.5/10
Heavymetal.no	9.5/10 stars

Armada is the third studio album by the Norwegian black metal band Keep of Kalessin. The album was originally released under Tabu Records, however a 2 vinyl set of the album was released on Back On Black. The release features the return of drummer Vyl, and new bassist Wizziac and vocalist Thebon.

== Track listing ==
No.	Title	Length
1.	"Surface"	1:09
2.	"Crown of the Kings"	7:11
3.	"The Black Uncharted"	6:52
4.	"Vengeance Rising"	5:01
5.	"Many are We"	4:52
6.	"Winged Watcher"	3:53
7.	"Into the Fire"	4:10
8.	"Deluge"	2:43
9.	"The Wealth of Darkness"	6:26
10.	"Armada"	7:32
11.	"Outro"	3:57
Total length:		53:46

=== Notes ===
1. Music videos for the songs Crown of the Kings and Into the Fire were made.
2. The outro is not featured on the actual album, but was made downloadable from the official forum.
3. All Songs Written By Obsidian C. (music) and Torsten Parelius (lyrics).

== Personnel ==
- Torbjørn "Thebon" Schei - lead vocals
- Arnt Ove "Obsidian C." Grønbech - guitars, keyboards, synths
- Robin "Wizziac" Isaksen - bass
- Vegar "Vyl" Larsen - drums
- Attila Csihar: additional vocals
- Haakon Marius Petterson: additional keyboards
