= Through Times of War =

Studio album by Keep of Kalessin
- Released: April 27, 1997
- Recorded: 1997; Brygga Studios, Trondheim
- Genre: Black metal
- Length: 47:36
- Label: Avantgarde Music

Keep of Kalessin chronology
Skygger Av Sorg (1995)	Through Times of War (1997)	Agnen: A Journey Through the Dark (1999)

Professional ratings
Review scores
Source	Rating
Rock Hard	8/10
Chronicles of Chaos	7/10

Through Times of War is the first studio album by Norwegian black metal band Keep of Kalessin, released on April 27, 1997 through Avantgarde Music. The album shows a combination of fast, dark and epic black metal. It was re-released through World War III in 2002, by Avantgarde Music a second time in 2006 and by Snapper that same year. Peaceville Records is known to re-release this album as a digipak in 2007.

== Track listing ==
No.	Title	Length
1.	"Through Times of War"	4:31
2.	"Den Siste Krig"	4:43
3.	"As a Shadow Cast"	6:09
4.	"I Choose to Suffer"	6:50
5.	"Skygger av Sorg"	5:22
6.	"Obliterator"	5:42
7.	"Nectarous Red - Itch"	14:19
Total length:		47:36

== Personnel ==
- Arnt "Obsidian C." Ove Grønbech - guitars, synths
- Øyvind "Warach" A. Winther - bass
- Ghâsh - vocals
- Vegar "Vyl" Larsen - drums
- Torstein Parelius - lyrics ("Obliterator" and "Nectarous Red - Itch")
