= Nouveau Gloaming =

Studio album by Code
- Released: June 13, 2005
- Genre: Black metal, doom metal
- Length: 53:55
- Label: Spikefarm Records

Code chronology
| Neurotransmissions - Amplified Thought Chemistry (2002) | Nouveau Gloaming (2005) | Resplendent Grotesque (2009) |

Nouveau Gloaming is the debut full-length album by Norwegian/English black metal band Code. The album was released on June 13, 2005 through Spikefarm Records.

== Track listing ==
1. "The Cotton Optic" – 5:15
2. "Brass Dogs" – 7:49
3. "An Enigma In Brine" – 5:55
4. "A Cloud Formed Teardrop Asylum" – 7:25
5. "Aeon In Cinders" – 5:15
6. "Tyburn" – 6:10
7. "Radium" – 7:10
8. "Ghost Formula" – 8:56

== Recording Line-Up ==
- Aort (Blutvial) - Guitars
- Yusaf "Viper" Parvez aka Vicotnik (Dødheimsgard, Ved Buens Ende) - Bass, backing vocals
- Erik Olivier Lancelot aka AiwarikiaR (ex-Ulver, ex-Valhall) - Drums
- Kvohst (ex-Void, Dødheimsgard) - Vocals
- Vyttra - Guitar
