= Ondskapt =

Swedish black metal band

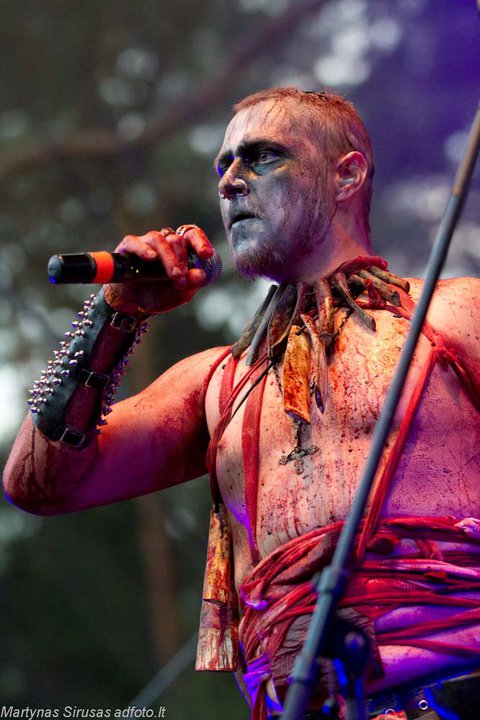

Background information
- Origin: Stockholm, Sweden
- Genres: Black metal
- Years active: 2000–2023
- Label: Osmose Productions
- Past members: Acerbus; Nabemih; Skamfer; Wredhe; S.B. Avsky; M. Hinze; Nattdal; Kvarforth; S.W. E.L. Daemonum S. Gefandi Ör Andlät; Draugr; J. Megiddo; DIE; J. L.
- Website: ondskapt.atspace.com

Ondskapt (Swedish for "created of evil") was a Swedish black metal band. They have previously shared members with other Swedish metal projects such as IXXI and Shining.

== History ==
Ondskapt were formed in Stockholm in 2000 by vocalist Acerbus and drummer Nabemih, their guitarist at the time Skamfer came up with the band's name. Their EP Slave Under His Immortal Will was released through Shining vocalist Kvarforth's label Selbstmord Services in 2001, followed by their début album Draco Sit Mihi Dux in 2003, Fredric Gråby a.k.a. Wredhe was brought to the band to play bass and additional guitars on that album. Their second album Dödens Evangelium was released through Next Horizon Records and Norma Evangelium Diaboli in 2005. The band completed their lineup with bassist Siavosh Bigonah and guitarist Nattdal.

In 2006 Acerbus joined guitarist Nattdal's band IXXI, which rendered Ondskapt "basically dead" for two years, according to Acerbus, since, around the same time the band's co-founder and drummer Nabemih had moved out of Stockholm and guitarist Wredhe left the band to join Shining which meant the band was not able to record new music or perform live since the remaining members were not available to do so, however both Acerbus and Nabemih kept writing new music for their next album and by 2008 had assembled a new lineup to record and perform live with members of fellow Swedish bands Valkyrja and Mortuus, the most notable being current Amon Amarth drummer Jocke Wallgren. The band signed to Osmose Productions, who released the band's third album Arisen From the Ashes in 2010. Nattdal left Ondskapt in 2007 to focus on his bands IXXI and Lifelover but died due to an accidental prescription drug overdose on 9 September 2011.

Co-founder Nabemih left the band after the recording of their third album, leaving Acerbus as the sole original and constant member since the band had a rotating line up which delayed recording any new material for a decade, however and in spite of it the band continued to regularly tour and perform live. In 2017 the band posted their new line up on their official Facebook and announced that they would finally start the writing and recording process of their fourth album, however in 2019 guitarist Draugr left the band, leaving the line up as a trio that consisted of front man Acerbus, bassist Gefandi Ör Andlät and drummer Daemonum Subeunt. The band would later recruit guitarist J. Megiddo to complete their lineup.

On 17 May 2019 the band announced that they would "enter the studio" in mid June to start working for seven weeks on their long-awaited fourth full-length album for a tentative 2020 release, recording was completed in mid October after a five month process, and received the master in November. In March 2020, Gefandi Ör Andlät left the band "for personal reasons" which delayed the album's release. Ondskapt's fourth studio album Grimoire Ordo Devus was released on 27 November 2020 through Osmose Productions.

On 24 August 2021, the band announced that guitarist DIE and bassist J. from the band Anguish had joined Ondskapt as full time members. In late 2022 J. Megiddo left the band to focus on Marduk, and was replaced by Anguish guitarist L. The band played their final show at A Sinister Purpose in Leipzig, Germany on March 31, 2023, and two months later on May 31, Acerbus announced on Facebook that Ondskapt was over.

== Style and ideology ==
Ondskapt are supposedly inspired by Ofermod. Their lyrical themes deal mostly with Theistic Satanism and Death Worship. Ondskapt are, according to their first release Slave Under His Immortal Will, ″merely an instrument of religious Devilworship, thus, the music and lyrics never would exist without the doctrinal as well as spiritual inversion of orthodox faith″. They released a manifesto referring to their Devil worship on their first album and their homepage. They are a part of a newer generation of Swedish Satanic bands like Watain, also supposedly inspired by Ofermod, who put this scene "into a new light" and became the leaders of the Swedish scene. Kvarforth said, "[i]t seems like people actually [got] afraid again".

== Discography ==
- Slave Under His Immortal Will (EP, 2001)
- Draco Sit Mihi Dux (2003)
- Dödens Evangelium (2005)
- Arisen from the Ashes (2010)
- Grimoire Ordo Devus (2020)
