= In Solitude =

Swedish heavy metal band

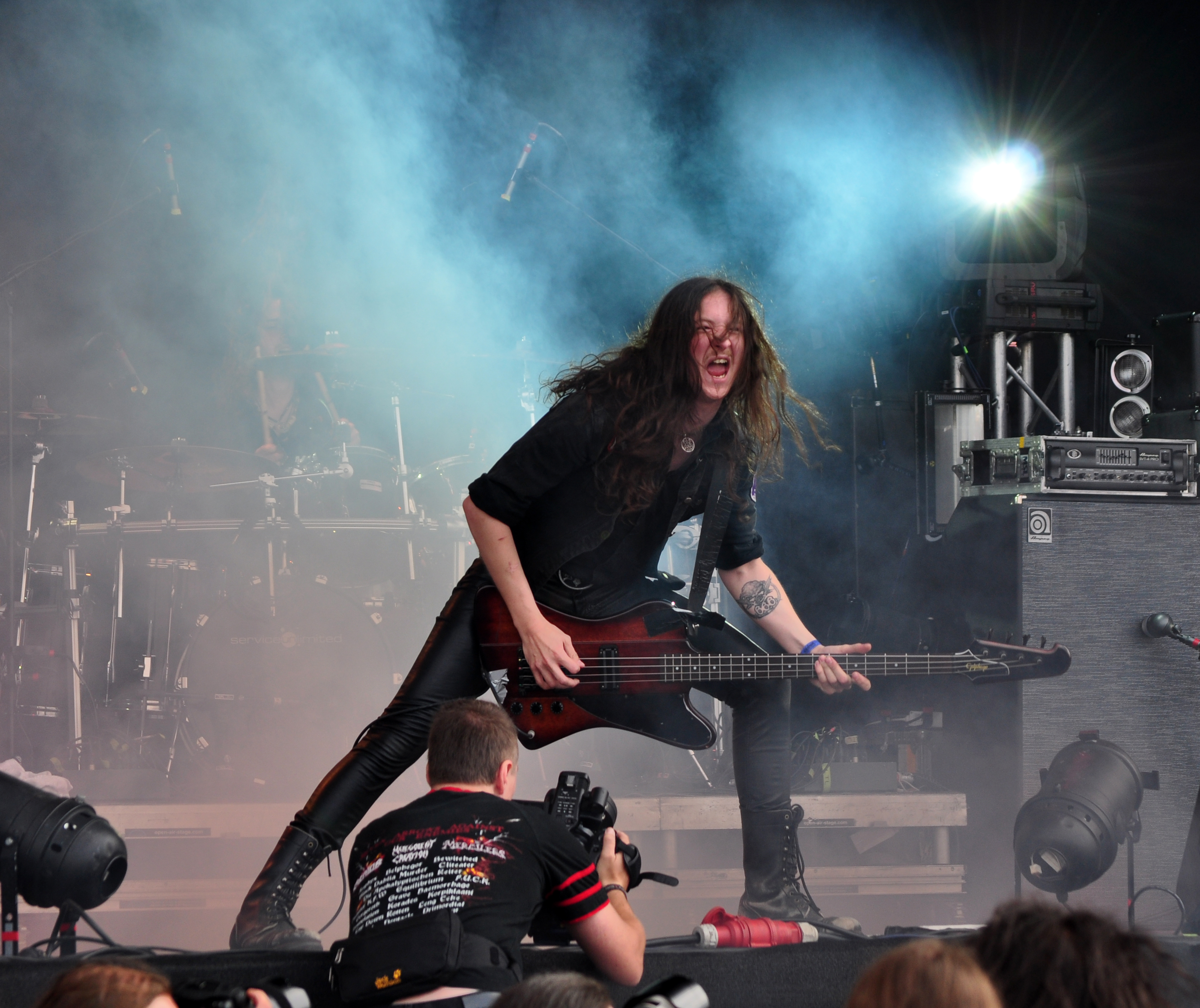
- In Solitude at Party.San Metal Open Air 2012

Background information
- Origin: Uppsala, Sweden
- Genres: Heavy metal, occult rock
- Years active: 2002–2015
- Labels: Pure Steel, High Roller, Season of Mist, Metal Blade
- Members: Pelle "Hornper" Åhman; Niklas Lindström; Henrik Palm; Gottfrid Åhman; Uno Bruniusson
- Past members: Henrik Helenius; Mattias Gustavsson

In Solitude was a Swedish heavy metal band from Uppsala.

== History ==
The band formed in 2002 with Henrik Helenius, Niklas Lindström, Gottfrid Åhman, and Uno Bruniusson. Pelle Åhman (Gottfrid's brother) joined the band as their lead vocalist in 2003. They released their first, self-titled demo in 2004. The following year, vocalist/guitarist Henrik Heleius left the band and was replaced by Mattias Gustafsson in the same year. In 2006 the band released the second demo, Hidden Dangers, and in 2008, Sweden's S.M.P. Records released the EP Hidden Dangers as a 7″. Shortly after this the band released their self-titled full-length debut in the form of a CD on Pure Steel Records and on vinyl through High Roller Records. The album was recorded at Burlesco Studios at the same as the demos, and was produced by Hasse Bruniusson. In support of the album, In Solitude participated in Keep It True, Up the Hammers, Pounding Metal, Metal Magic and Hell's Pleasures festivals throughout the year, before Mattias Gustafsson left the band in 2009.

In Solitude signed a worldwide deal with Metal Blade Records in 2010, as Henrik Palm joined the band, and in November of that year the band began recording their second full-length album, The World, The Flesh, The Devil. The album was released on May 23, 2011 and was received positively, landing the No. 4 spot on Decibel Magazine's Top 40 Extreme Albums of 2011. Terrorizer called the album "finely crafted, occult-oriented, melodic heavy metal of the highest order" and was it the "5th Best Metal Blade Album Ever". The band toured in support of this album for two years, and featured at festivals including Wacken Open Air, Hole in the Sky, and Roadburn, and appeared on tours in the UK with Amon Amarth, as well as in North America as a part of the Decibel Magazine Tour, as well as in support of Down.

In March 2013 the band went into Studio Cobra in Stockholm, Sweden to record their third album. The album, Sister, was released through Metal Blade Records on October 1, 2013, and was produced and mixed by Martin "Konie" Ehrencrona. The album averaged 78/100 on Metacritic which indicates "Generally favorable reviews," and received many accolades including being named No. 2 in the Top 40 Extreme Albums of 2013 by Decibel, No. 4 on 20 Best Metal Albums of 2013 by Rolling Stone, and No. 15 on Top 40 Best Metal Albums of 2013 by Pitchfork. In Solitude supported Watain on their headline North America tour in October 2013. In October 2013 it was confirmed that in Solitude would support Behemoth and Cradle of Filth on their European tour in February 2014.

In a joint post by "Pelle, Uno, Gotte, Nicke and Henke" on Facebook dated April 3, 2015, In Solitude made official their amicable decision "to end In Solitude here". In the statement, they apologized for the shock the announcement will likely have caused. They thanked its "closest brothers and sisters for being there" during the band's 13-year career. The reason cited was "changes in [their] personal lives".

== Band members ==
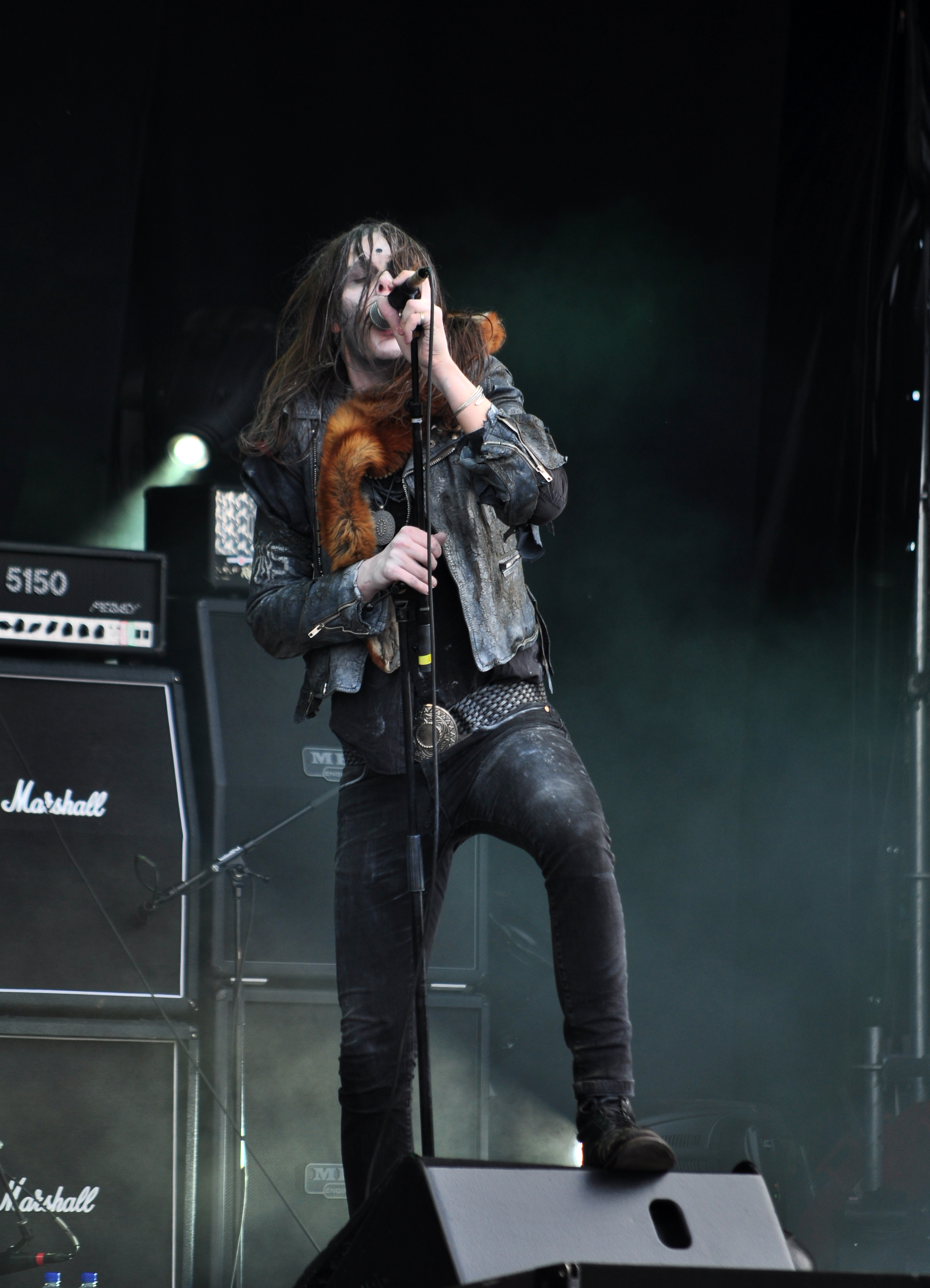
In Solitude at Party.San Open Air 2012

=== Final lineup ===
- Niklas Lindström – guitars (2002–2015)
- Gottfrid Åhman – bass guitar (2002–2015)
- Uno Bruniusson – drums (2002–2015)
- Pelle "Hornper" Åhman – lead vocals (2003–2015)
- Henrik Palm – guitar (2010–2015)

=== Former members ===
- Henrik Helenius – guitar, vocals (2002–2005)
- Mattias Gustavsson – guitar, vocals (2006–2009)

== Discography ==
=== Album ===
- 2008: In Solitude (Pure Steel Records / High Roller Records)
- 2011: The World. The Flesh. The Devil. (Metal Blade Records)
- 2013: Sister (Metal Blade Records)

=== Singles ===
- 2004: "In Solitude" (demo)
- 2006: "Hidden Dangers" (demo)
- 2008: "Hidden Dangers" (single, S.M.P. Records)
- 2012: "Mother of Mercy" (flexidisk included in Decibel Magazine #91)
- 2013: "Lavender" (single, Svart Records)
