= Gaahls Wyrd =

Norwegian black metal band

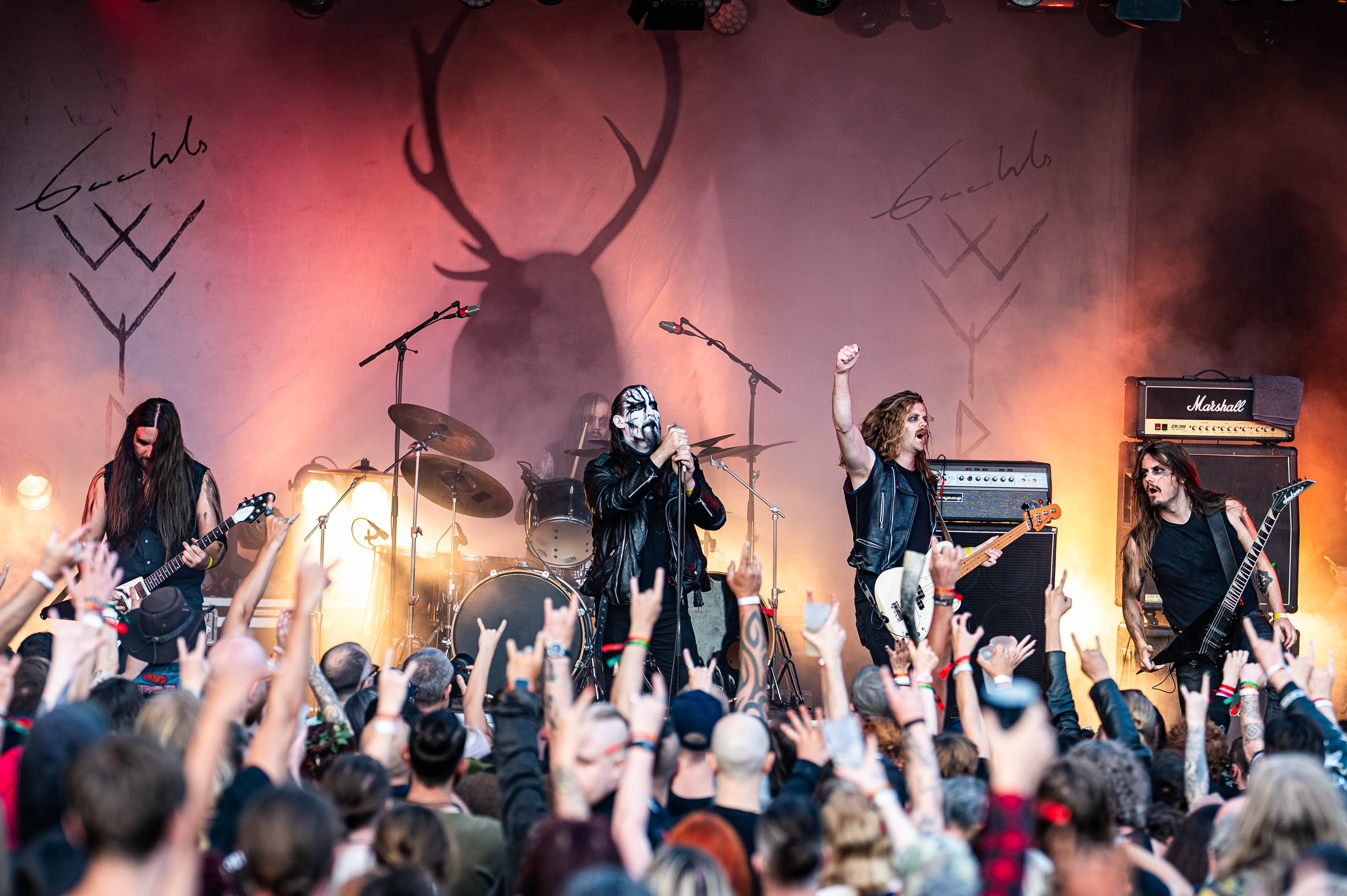

Background information
- Origin: Bergen, Norway
- Genres: Black metal
- Years active: 2015–present
- Labels: Season of Mist
- Members: Gaahl; Lust Kilman; Spektre; Nekroman
- Past members: Baard Kolstad; Sir; Eld

Gaahls Wyrd is a Norwegian black metal band based in Bergen, formed in 2015 by former Gorgoroth and God Seed vocalist Gaahl.

== History ==
In September 2015 (one month after God Seed's final show), Gaahl announced his new band, Gaahls Wyrd, who played their first live show at the Blekkmetal Festival in Norway on 13 November 2015.

In regards to forming the new band, Gaahl stated:

I'm very pleased with what me and Tom have done together. We've created a lot of good songs, but I think the difference between us is probably the reason why I've started this new band. I've made a lot of my favourite songs that I've created in God Seed and I've brought with me one of these characters from that band.

Since their formation, Gaahls Wyrd has been consistently touring; their repertoire consists of selected songs from Gaahl's past projects, including tracks from Incipit Satan, Twilight of the Idols, and Ad Majorem Sathanas Gloriam by Gorgoroth, God Seed's debut album, and assorted tracks by Trelldom. They have also had a variety of guest performers on their shows.

In 2016, they released footage of their debut performance.

In 2017, drummer Baard Kolstad left the band and was replaced by Kevin Kvåle aka "Spektre". Guitarist Stian "Sir" Kårstad also left the following year and was replaced by Ole Hartvigsen of Kampfar for live performances. Both members quit the band for undisclosed reasons.

On 1 December 2017, the band independently released a 12" hand-numbered EP titled Bergen Nov '15 and included six live tracks that were performed and recorded during their live debut in 2015; it featured Kvitrafn on vocals and playing the hurdy-gurdy as a guest for the first track. It was exclusively sold on the Vardøger European Tour 2017 with Auðn and The Great Old Ones and was limited to 1,000 copies. On 4 May 2018, it was reissued and made widely available in CD format through Season of Mist. In September that same year the band also announced their signing to Season of Mist to release their debut album.

The band announced a two month long European tour with Swedish band Tribulation and American bands Uada and Idle Hands called "Northern Ghosts Tour" that started on 21 February 2019, and ended on 10 March.

The band's promotional single "Ghosts Invited" was released online on 7 February and revealed that the name of their debut album will be GastiR – Ghosts Invited and is going to be released on 31 May 2019; the album was recorded throughout 2018 at Solslottet Studios in Norway with Iver Sandøy of Enslaved, though most of the music was written and demoed by Lust Kilman and Eld as early as 2016. The second promotional single "From the Spear" was released on 13 March. On 16 April, the band released their first music video for the song "Carving the Voices" which was directed, shot and edited by Troll Toftenes. GastiR – Ghosts Invited was released on digital platforms on 24 May 2019, and physical media the following week. The band has also continued performing live and will be featured in several festivals. The band also revealed that Blasphemer of Aura Noir and VLTIMAS fame had joined the band as a second live guitarist since Ole Hartvigsen had to return to Kampfar for their live performances in support of their new album. Eriksen would later depart to focus on his bands, and was replaced by Andreas Fosse Salbu as live guitarist.

In December 2019, GastiR – Ghosts Invited was rated the third best metal album of the year by the American magazine Rolling Stone, and on 7 February 2020, it was nominated for Best Metal Album in the Norwegian music award Spellemannsprisen. Due to the outbreak of COVID-19 and the following national lockdown during spring of 2020, the Spellemannsprisen award show was cancelled until further notice. A few months later, it was announced that Gaahls Wyrd had won the Spellemann Award for Best Metal Album of 2019.

== Band members ==
Current members

- Gaahl (Kristian Espedal) – vocals (2015–present)
- Lust Kilman (Ole Walaunet) – guitar (2015–present)
- Spektre (Kevin Kvåle) – drums (2017–present)
- Nekroman (Andreas Fosse Salbu) – bass (2024–present, live guitar 2019–2024)

Former members

- Baard Kolstad – drums (2015–2017)
- Sir (Stian Kårstad) – guitar (2015–2018)
- Eld (Frode Kilvik) – bass (2015–2024)

Live members

- Ole Hartvigsen – guitars (2018–2019)
- Blasphemer – guitars (2019)

== Discography ==
=== Studio albums ===
- GastiR – Ghosts Invited (2019)
- Braiding the Stories (2025)

=== Live albums ===
- Bergen Nov '15 (2017)

=== EPs ===
- The Humming Mountain (2021)

=== Singles ===
- "Ghosts Invited" (2019)
- "From the Spear" (2019)
- "Carving the Voices" (2019)
- "Braiding the Stories" (2025)
