= Gaahlskagg =

Norwegian black metal band

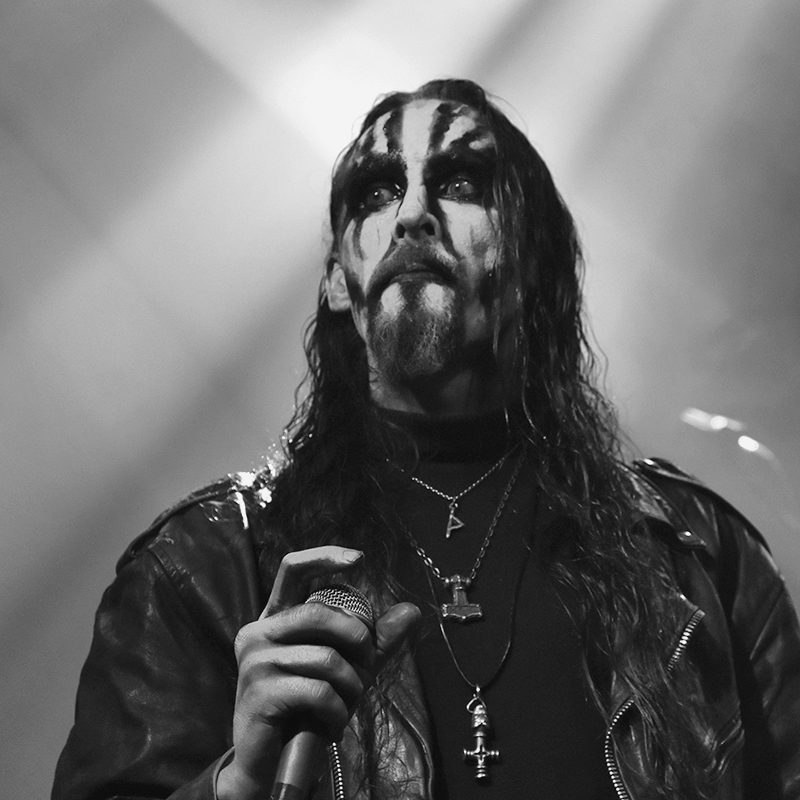
- Gaahl performing with Gaahls Wyrd in 2017

Background information
- Origin: Sunnfjord, Sogn og Fjordane, Norway
- Genre: Black metal
- Years active: 1998–2001 (hiatus)
- Label: No Colours Records
- Spinoff of: Trelldom; Sigfader
- Past members: Gaahl; Skagg

Gaahlskagg is a Norwegian black metal band from Sunnfjord. Gaahl and Skagg founded the band as a side project in 1998. Gaahlskagg released one studio album before going on hiatus in 2001 due to Gaahl's commitment to Gorgoroth.

== History ==
Gaahlskagg was founded in 1998 by singer Gaahl and guitarist Skagg, who were members of Sigfader. The duo entered Grieghallen Studio in 1999 and recorded their debut album with session members Tormentor, Terje Martinussen, and Herbrand Larsen. Three tracks were released as part of the split Erotic Funeral Party I / Styggmyrs triumf with Stormfront in 1999. Gaahlskagg released their debut album, Erotic Funeral, in 2000.

For their sophomore album, Av Norrønt Blod, the band recruited session drummer Thurzur. The recorded material was destroyed in 2001, and due to Gaahl's activities with Gorgoroth, the band did not re-record the tracks. Gaahl and Skagg later performed together in Gorgoroth when the latter joined as a live guitarist in 2005. Gaahl has since performed in God Seed, Wardruna, and Gaahls Wyrd, while Skagg founded the band Deathcult and performed live with Taake.

== Members ==
=== Founders ===
- Gaahl – vocals (1998–2001)
- Skagg – guitars (1998–2001)

=== Former session members ===
- Tormentor – bass
- Terje Martinussen – drums
- Herbrand Larsen – electronics
- Thurzur – drums

== Discography ==
- Erotic Funeral (2000)
