= Lindy-Fay Hella =

Norwegian musician

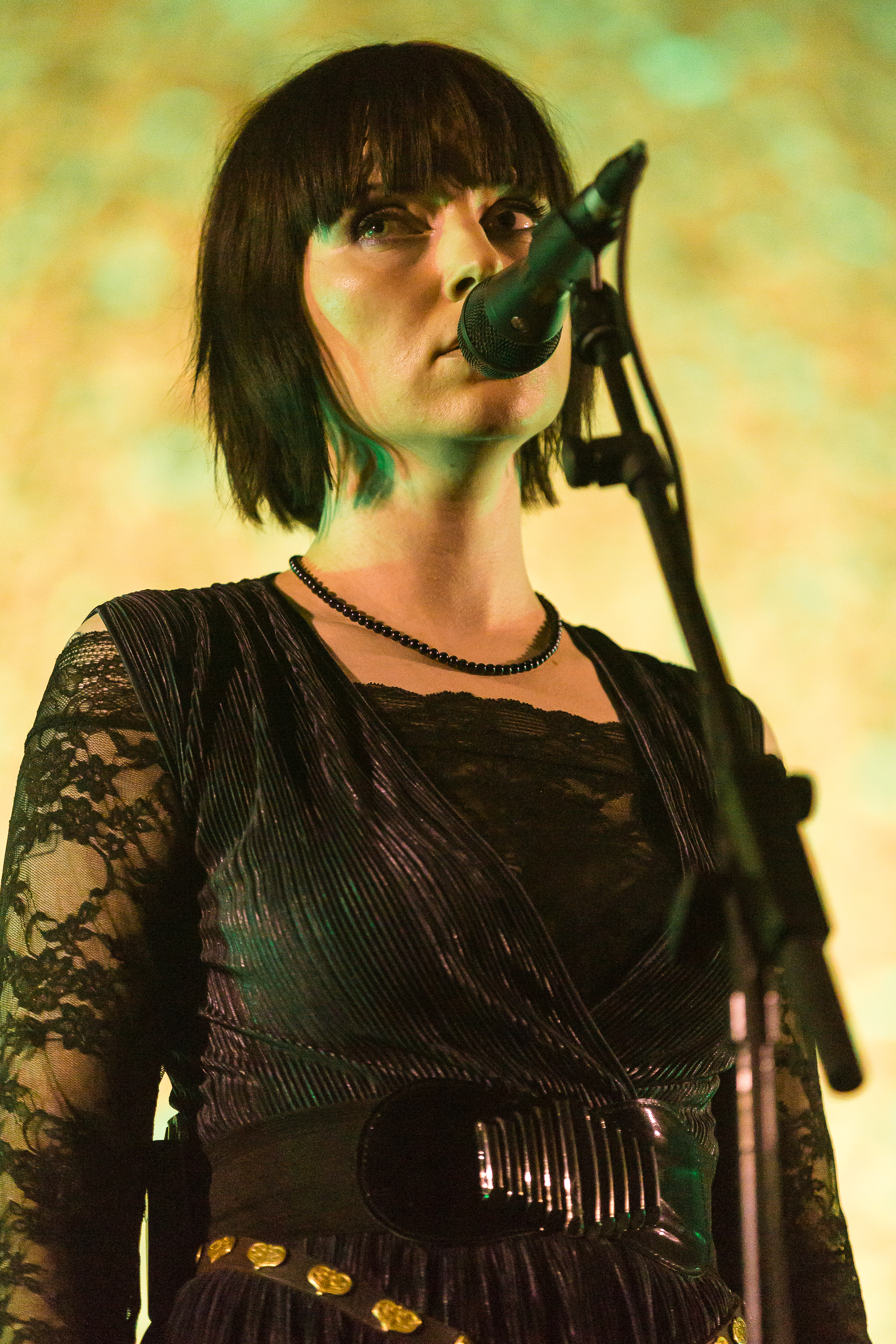
- Hella performing live with Wardruna in 2018

Background information
- Born: April 25, 1975 (age 51)
- Origin: Bergen, Norway
- Genres: Folk; electronic; ambient
- Instruments: Vocals; synthesizer
- Years active: 1997–present
- Member of: Wardruna; Lindy-Fay Hella & Dei Farne
- Formerly of: Ullan Gensa

Lindy-Fay Hella (born in 1975) is a Norwegian singer, musician and composer, known as a member of Wardruna and Lindy-Fay Hella & Dei Farne. She played electronic music before becoming a founding member of Wardruna, which plays eclectic music influenced by runes. Her singing features prominently in Wardruna's Runaljod album trilogy. Hella released an electronic pop solo album in 2019. She released two further solo albums under the name Lindy-Fay Hella & Dei Farne.

== Early life ==
Lindy-Fay Hella was born in 1975 and grew up on the island of Radøy close to Bergen in Norway. As a teenager, she sang in a band influenced by punk and grunge music. She took singing lessons both in classical European techniques and in various folk music traditions, including joik and Eastern European and African styles. She collaborated with Norwegian music acts of different genres. In the early 2000s, she and Arne Sandvoll founded the electronic music duo Ullan Gensa, which released tracks on the Internet and performed a few concerts in Norway.

== Wardruna ==
The multi-instrumentalist Einar Selvik, who began to develop the eclectic ambient music group Wardruna in 2002, had seen one of Ullan Gensa's shows and approached Hella. Selvik said he wanted the particular energy of Hella's singing to feature in Wardruna's music, which revolves around brooding moods, historical instruments and runes. The initial plan was for Hella to only appear on two songs, but she became a founding and permanent member. She is featured prominently on the group's first three albums, the Runaljod trilogy, released in 2009–2016. Selvik usually creates the principal melodies for the songs, but Hella writes some of her own vocal melodies.

== Lindy-Fay Hella & Dei Farne ==
Hella released her debut solo album Seafarer on the label Ván Records in September 2019. The album combines folk influences with electronic pop and ambient music. Hella's original plan was to make it an album with only her vocals, but she became bored with the idea and brought in a few collaborators, including producer and former-Enslaved keyboardist Herbrand Larsen, Wardruna member Eilif Gundersen and metal singer Kristian "Gaahl" Espedal. The album track "Two Suns" was released with a music video.

For her second album, Hella teamed up with the musicians Roy Ole Førland, Ingolf Hella Torgersen and Sondre Veland and fashioned her project as Lindy-Fay Hella & Dei Farne. The album Hildring (lit. 'Mirage') was released by By Norse on 26 November, 2021. The music is inspired by rural locations outside Bergen and revolves around a wondrous view of the natural world and it elements. The tracks "Hildring" and "The Lake" were released with music videos. Laura McCarthy of Distorted Sound wrote that the album combines groundedness in the natural world with an appeal to the mystical, and a will to be both in the past and the future.

A third album, Islet, was released by By Norse in 2024.

== Whispering Void ==
In 2024, Hella launched the group Whispering Void, whose other members are Gaahl on vocals, Ronny "Valgard" Stavestrand on guitar and Iver Sandøy on drums and bass. Signed by Prophecy Productions, it was presented as a supergroup. The debut single "Vi finnes" (lit. 'We exist') was released on 23 July 2024. The album At the Sound of the Heart was released on 18 October the same year.

== Selected discography ==
=== With Wardruna ===
- Runaljod – Gap Var Ginnunga (2009)
- Runaljod – Yggdrasil (2013)
- Runaljod – Ragnarok (2016)
- Kvitravn (2021)
- Birna (2025)

=== Solo ===
- Seafarer (2019)
- Hildring (2021) – as Lindy-Fay Hella & Dei Farne
- Islet (2024) – as Lindy-Fay Hella & Dei Farne

=== With Whispering Void ===
- At the Sound of the Heart (2024)
