= Leo Ajkic =

Bosnian actor and television presenter

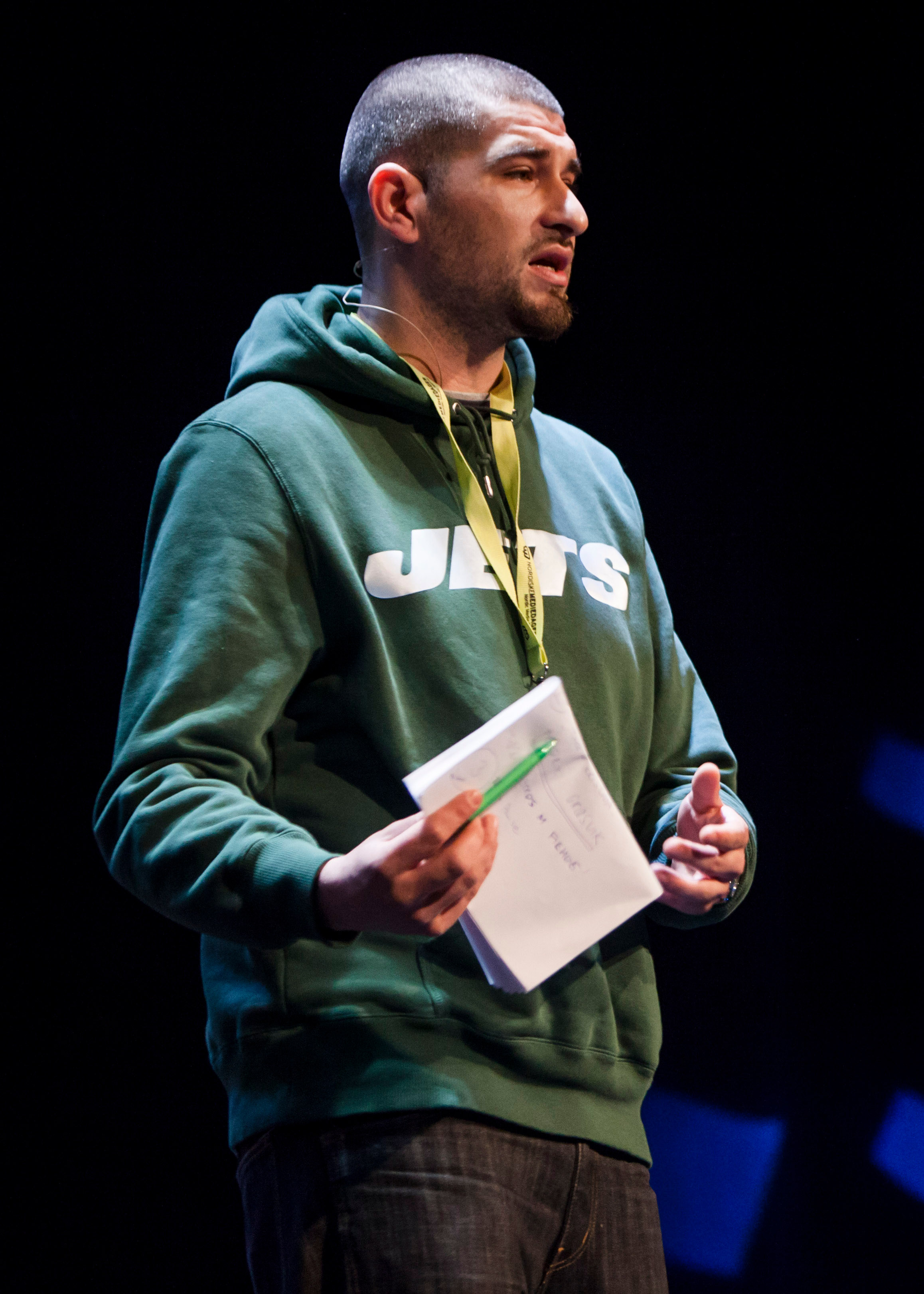
- Ajkic at Nordic Media Days 2013
- Born: 21 November 1983 (age 42)
- Citizenship: Norway
- Occupations: actor; television presenter; talent manager
- Employer: NMG/G-Huset
- Honours: Fritt Ords honnør (2017) Ole Vig-prisen (2017); Jonas Prize (2019); Gullruten award for best TV host (2017) Gullruten award for best TV host (2022)

Leo Ajkic (born 21 November 1983 in Mostar in Yugoslavia) is a Norwegian-Bosnian presenter for radio and TV.

== Background and work ==
Ajkic and his family fled Mostar because of the war Serbian-Bosnia and Herzegovina. He participated in the circuit championship in mathematics when he lived in Bosnia. After four years on the run, they came to Norway. Ajkic was then eleven years old.

He began a university education with the subjects academic writing, Examen philosophicum, and social anthropology at the University of Bergen.

Ajkic started with TV in 2007 when he made two seasons of the series Kåk, Gate and the THC effect together with Synopsis Film for BTV, Bergens Tidende's TV channel. During the recording of Kåk, he threw a cat off Kjersti Berge's terrace, which got him reported by the organization Kattens Vern and the Norwegian Food Safety Authority. Despite a storm of viewers and police reports, the case was dropped. In 2010 he joined NRK P3. In the summer of 2011, he was programme manager for the Lifeguards and made the series Leo tester Hove two years in a row. In the autumn of 2011, he worked in Banden on P3, the Trygdekontoret on NRK3 and TV-aksjonen 2011 on NRK1. In the spring of 2012, he hosted the series Leo & de utstøtte on NRK P3 and in the autumn of 2012, he hosted the TV programme Leo og u-landslaget on NRK3. In 2013 and 2014, he was the presenter of Typen til on NRK3, which was a sequel to Live Nelvik's Dama til from 2011. Ajkic was then one of the people Nelvik was "the lady to". He was nominated for the audience award in front of Gullruten 2013.

In January and February 2017, he was the presenter of the TV series Flukt on NRK1, where he gave an insight into the everyday life of some of those who flee. After the series, he was awarded Fritt Ord's honour prize. In the explanation, it is said, among other things, "transl. In Flukt, Ajkic has deliberately used his own background as a refugee to tell the personal and dramatic stories of refugees in Europe and Norway: Who are they, how do they live, what do they think, what do they dream about?". He was also named best male presenter during the Gullruten 2017 and was nominated for the public television award, while the series won two further awards, including best documentary series.

Ajkic is the presenter of the documentary series Rus, which was produced in 2020 and 2021 by Pandora Film. The series is about Norwegian youth and drugs. It premiered on NRK TV and NRK1 on Monday, 18 October 2021. For the series, Ajkic won the Gullruten 2022 in the category best presenter – news, sport or current affairs.

== Awards and achievements ==
- 2013: Nominated for Gullruten 2013, the audience award
- 2017: Fritt Ord's honor
- 2017: Gullruten 2017, best male presenter for Flukt
- 2017: Nominated for Gullruten 2017, the audience award for Flukt
- 2017: Ole Vig prize
- 2019: Jonasprisen
- 2022: Gullruten 2022, best presenter – news, sport or current affairs for Rus
- 2022: Nominated for Gullruten 2022, the audience award for Rus
