= True Norwegian Black Metal (film series) =

- Produced by: Peter Beste, Rob Semmer, Ivar Berglin, Mike Washlesky, Monica Hampton
- Starring: Gaahl; Peter Beste; Ivar Berglin
- Cinematography: Mike Washlesky
- Edited by: Jake Burghart
- Music by: Wardruna, Gorgoroth, Trelldom
- Distributed by: VBS TV
- Release date: April 2007
- Running time: 32 minutes
- Language: English

True Norwegian Black Metal is a 2007 5-part documentary film produced by VBS/Vice Magazine. The documentary mainly covers some aspects of the life of black metal vocalist Gaahl, renowned for his work with Gorgoroth.

== Synopsis ==
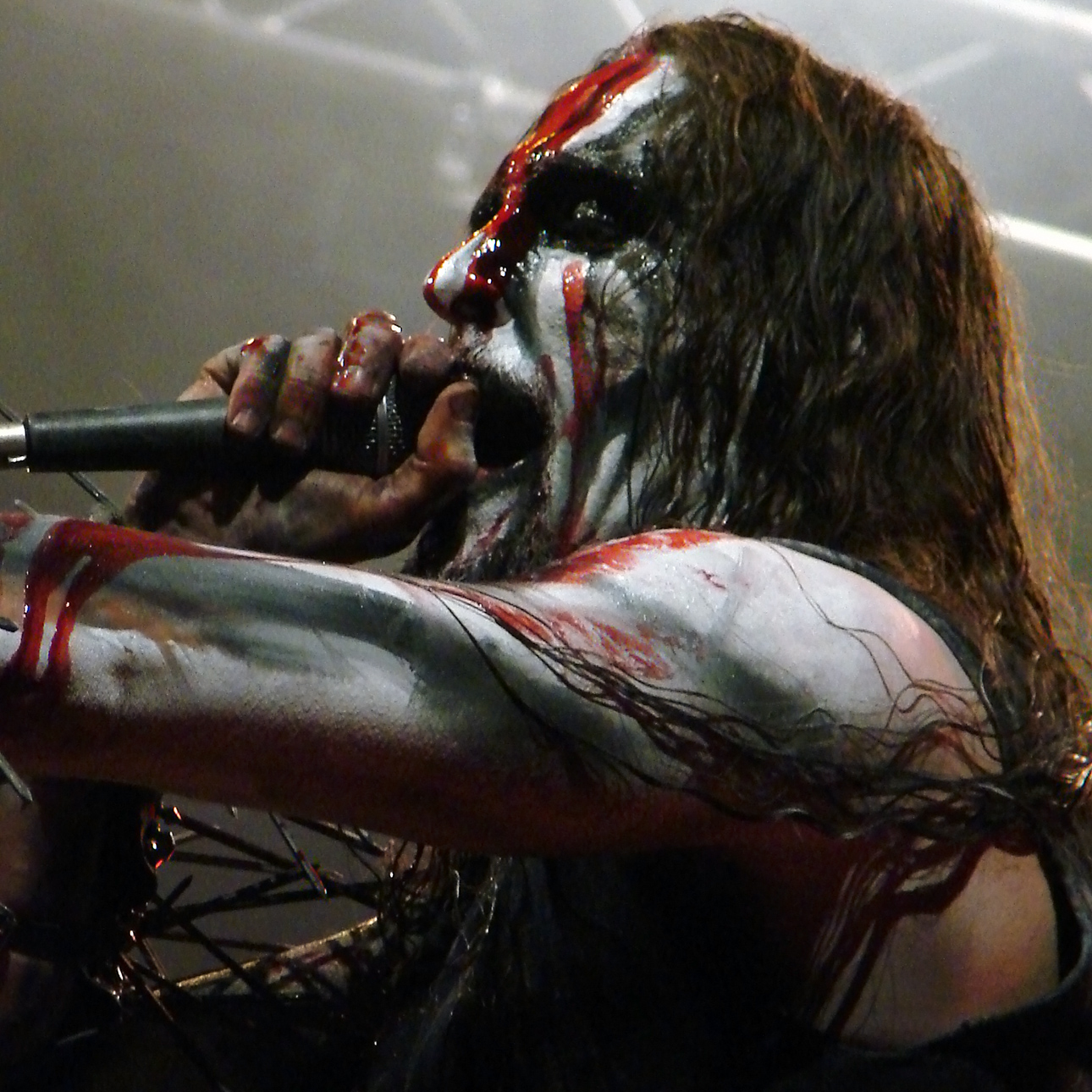
The film featured metal vocalist Gaahl (seen in 2009)

The documentary mainly covers some aspects of the life of black metal vocalist Gaahl, renowned for his work with Gorgoroth and Trelldom.

== Production ==
It was produced by Peter Beste for Vice. Principal photography took place in January 2007 over a ten-day period in various parts of Norway including Bergen, Oslo, Espedal, and Dale. The documentary is hosted by Vice-Scandinavia correspondent Ivar Berglin who also served as translator.

During production in January 2007, it was reported that Gaahl was under investigation by Norwegian Police for his comments in Metal: A Headbanger's Journey (2005), which had been broadcast on Norway's Lydverket NRK 1 on January 24, 2007, where he said 'church burnings are things that I support one-hundred percent, and they should have been done much more and will be done much more in the future'.

== Reception ==
In April 2007, the five-part series entitled True Norwegian Black Metal aired on VBS.tv.

Accuracy

The documentary was criticized by Rock'nBalls for misreporting information, as well as introducing the misconception that Gaahl spends most of his time in seclusion, when in actuality he lived in a flat in Bergen, often socializing in bars. Gaahl himself described the story about his tenure at school and a schoolmate who allegedly committed suicide as being 'five different stories rolled into one fictional story', in that the memory of producer Rob Semmer was incorrectly mixing up several anecdotes.
