= Espedal =

Village in Fjaler Municipality, Norway

Espedal Espedalen
- Hamlet
- Interactive map of Espedal; Espedalen
- Location within Vestland Location within Norway
- Coordinates: 61.26667°N 5.33333°E
- Country: Norway
- Region: Western Norway
- County: Vestland
- District: Sunnfjord
- Municipality: Fjaler Municipality
- Elevation: 241 m (791 ft)
- Time zone: UTC+01:00 (CET)
  - Summer (DST): UTC+02:00 (CEST)
- Post Code: 6968 Flekke

Espedal or Espedalen is a valley and hamlet in Fjaler Municipality in Vestland county, Norway. It is located about 12 kilometres (7.5 mi) southwest of the municipal center of Dale, and about 8 kilometres (5.0 mi) southwest of the village of Flekke. The area is owned by the Espedal family.

Espedal is featured in the 2007 documentary film True Norwegian Black Metal which focused on some aspects of the life of black metal performer Kristian "Gaahl" Espedal. Espedal has been popularly mistaken for a village, a misconception perpetuated by the aforementioned documentary.

== Notable people ==
- Kristian Eivind Espedal (also known as: Gaahl), a black metal vocalist for the bands God Seed and Trelldom, and a former black metal vocalist for Gorgoroth
