= True Norwegian Black Metal =

True Norwegian Black Metal may refer to:

- A phrase devised by Darkthrone
- A book on black metal by Peter Beste
- True Norwegian Black Metal (film series)
- True Norwegian Black Metal – Live in Grieghallen
- Early Norwegian black metal scene
