= Runaljod – Yggdrasil =

Studio album by Wardruna
- Released: 15 March 2013
- Genre: Nordic folk, ambient, dark folk
- Length: 66:14
- Label: Indie Recordings/Fimbulljóð Productions
- Producer: Kvitrafn

Wardruna chronology
Runaljod – Gap Var Ginnunga (2009)	Runaljod – Yggdrasil (2013)	Runaljod - Ragnarok (2016)

Runaljod – Yggdrasil (The Sound of Runes - Yggdrasil) is the second album by Norwegian Nordic folk musical project Wardruna, released 15 March 2013 by Indie Recordings/Fimbulljóð Productions. It is an interpretation of the Elder Futhark and is sung in Norwegian, Old Norse and Proto-Norse. The lyrics center on Norse spiritual themes.

== Lyrical content and themes ==
The title of the opening song, "Rotlaust Tre Fell", meaning "a rootless tree falls", is based on the philosophy of the band. The song is an invocation of the Allfather Odin and "my mother Frigg" and "wise Vanir", "ancient Thurs" and the Norns. "Rotlaust Tre Fell" was used in the third season of Vikings during preparation for an attack on Paris.

"Fehu", which was used in the first season of TV series Vikings during a raiding scene, tells of the dangers of gold and wealth and how greed takes over the hearts of men.

The final track, "Helvegen" ("the Road to Hel") is essentially a funeral song. The song (and album) closes with the famous stanza from Hávamál: "Cattle die, kinsmen die, You yourself will also die, but the word about you will never die, if you win a good reputation. Cattle die, kinsmen die, You yourself will also die, I know one that never dies: the judgement of those who died". "Helvegen" was used in the second season of Vikings while Ragnar and his men prepare to sail again to Wessex and in the fifth season when Ubbe is gravely injured in a fight in Wessex and has a religious epiphany. The song has also been used satirically in Norwegian comedy series Norsemen.

== Track listing ==
No.	Title	English translation	Length
1.	"Rotlaust tre fell"	A rootless tree falls	4:11
2.	"Fehu"	Wealth	6:45
3.	"NaudiR"	Need	6:31
4.	"EhwaR"	Horse	4:10
5.	"AnsuR"	Áss	6:31
6.	"IwaR"	Yew	5:42
7.	"IngwaR"	Yngvi (Freyr)	5:28
8.	"Gibu"	Gift	5:30
9.	"Solringen"	The ring of the sun	6:30
10.	"Sowelu"	Sun	7:40
11.	"Helvegen"	The path to Hel	7:11
Total length:			66:41

== Personnel ==
- Einar Kvitrafn Selvik – vocals and instruments
- Gaahl – vocals
- Lindy-Fay Hella – vocals
