= Kvitravn (album) =

Studio album by Wardruna
- Released: 22 January 2021
- Genre: Nordic folk, world, ambient, dark folk
- Length: 65:00

Wardruna chronology
Skald (2018)	Kvitravn (2021)

Kvitravn is the fifth studio album by the Norwegian Nordic folk band Wardruna, released on 22 January 2021.

Lead singer Einar Selvik stated that the album "marks a distinct evolution in our sound", "features a broad selection of both traditional and historical instruments", and "discusses Northern sorcery, spirit-animals, shadows, nature and animism, the wisdom and meanings of certain myths, various Norse spiritual concepts, and the relation between sage and songs".

== Reception ==
Robert Hoftun Gjestad of Aftenposten wrote that Kvitravn has a fascinating soundscape but the songs sometimes become too monotonous. Financial Times wrote that the instruments and natural sounds "create a sense of huge elemental drama with heroic human actors" and described the songs as "stirring, solemn affairs, driven forward by hammered drums and chanted choral vocals". Nöjesguiden's Christoffer Bertzell said he was fascinated by Wardruna's exploration of musical roots, writing that Kvitravn is more "driven, dynamic and ritualistic" than the band's previous Runaljod trilogy, and has a greater "vocal focus" thanks to the guest vocalist Kirsten Bråten Berg.

== Track listing ==
1. "Synkverv" – 4:50
2. "Kvitravn" – 6:17
3. "Skugge" – 6:38
4. "Grá" – 3:33
5. "Fylgjutal" – 7:05
6. "Munin" – 5:26
7. "Kvit hjort" – 5:41
8. "Viseveiding" – 4:48
9. "Ni" – 4:28
10. "Vindavlarljod" – 6:39
11. "Andvevarljod" – 10:16

== Personnel ==
- Kvitrafn – vocals, drums, percussion, electronics, instruments
- Lindy-Fay Hella – vocals

== Charts ==
Chart (2021)	Peak position
Austrian Albums (Ö3 Austria)	1
Belgian Albums (Ultratop Flanders)	32
Belgian Albums (Ultratop Wallonia)	61
Dutch Albums (Album Top 100)	26
Finnish Albums (Suomen virallinen lista)	19
French Albums (SNEP)	65
German Albums (Offizielle Top 100)	2
Norwegian Albums (VG-lista)	11
Swiss Albums (Schweizer Hitparade)	2
UK Albums (OCC)	50
