= Runaljod – Gap Var Ginnunga =

Studio album by Wardruna
- Released: 19 January 2009
- Recorded: 2003–2008
- Genre: Nordic folk, ambient, dark folk
- Length: 51:54
- Label: Indie Recordings/Fimbulljóð Productions
- Producer: Kvitrafn

Wardruna chronology
Runaljod – Gap Var Ginnunga (2009)	Runaljod - Yggdrasil (2013)

Runaljod – Gap var ginnunga (Sound of Runes – The gap was vast) is the first album by Norwegian Nordic folk group Wardruna. It was released 19 January 2009 by Indie Recordings/Fimbulljóð Productions.

The album is the first chapter of the Runaljod trilogy (continued on the next two Wardruna albums), inspired by the 24 ancient runes of the Elder Futhark.

The lyrics were composed by Kvitrafn in Norwegian, Old Norse and Proto-Norse. Nordic traditional instruments such as percussion and strings were used in the recording of the album.

== Track listing ==
All songs written and arranged by Kvitrafn

No.	Title	English translation	Length
1.	"Ár var alda"	In Olden Times	2:19
2.	"Hagal"	Hail	7:40
3.	"Bjarkan"	Birch	5:53
4.	"Løyndomsriss"	Secret Carving	3:15
5.	"Heimta Thurs"	Calling Giants	4:18
6.	"Thurs"	Giant	1:16
7.	"Jara"	Year	5:02
8.	"Laukr"	Water	4:05
9.	"Kauna"	Ulcer	2:34
10.	"Algir - Stien klarnar"	Elk/Life - The Path Opens	4:17
11.	"Algir - Tognatale"	Elk/Life - Silence Speaks	5:39
12.	"Dagr"	Day	5:38
Total length:			51:54

== Personnel ==
- Kvitrafn – Vocals and instruments
- Gaahl – Vocals
- Lindy-Fay Hella – Vocals
- Hallvard Kleiveland – Hardanger fiddle
