= Runaljod – Ragnarok =

Studio album by Wardruna
- Released: 21 October 2016
- Genre: Nordic folk, world, ambient, dark folk
- Length: 58:45
- Label: Indie Recordings/By Norse Music
- Producer: Kvitrafn

Wardruna chronology
Runaljod - Yggdrasil (2013)	Runaljod – Ragnarok (2016)	Skald (2018)

Runaljod – Ragnarok is the third album by the Norwegian Nordic folk band Wardruna, released on 21 October 2016 by Indie Recordings/By Norse Music. It is the final chapter of the trilogy Runaljod, inspired by the 24 ancient runes of the Elder Futhark.

The album was preceded by the release of the first single, "Odal", on 21 August.

On 6 October, Wardruna released a music video and single for the song "Raido". The video was filmed, directed and produced by Finnish photographer Tuukka Koski.

== Track listing ==
Adapted from AllMusic.

No.	Title	English translation	Length
1.	"Tyr"	Týr	6:30
2.	"UruR"	Aurochs	10:11
3.	"Isa"	Ice	7:13
4.	"MannaR – Drivande"	Man – Drifting	4:09
5.	"MannaR – Liv"	Man – Life	5:13
6.	"Raido"	Ride	4:46
7.	"Pertho"	/ (Rune's meaning still unknown, possibly Peartree)	2:18
8.	"Odal"	Inheritance	5:29
9.	"Wunjo"	Happiness	5:20
10.	"Runaljod"	Sound of Runes	7:36
Total length:			58:45

== Personnel ==
- Kvitrafn – vocals, drums, percussion, electronics, instruments
- Lindy-Fay Hella – vocals
- Eilif Gundersen – bronze lure, birchbark lure, goat horn, willow flute, ice percussion
- Skarvebarna Children's Choir – choir
- Arne Sandvoll – vocals
- HC Daalgard – vocals
- Kjell Braaten – vocals

== Charts ==
Chart (2016)	Peak position
Belgian Albums (Ultratop Flanders)	149
German Albums (Offizielle Top 100)	68
Scottish Albums (OCC)	76
Swiss Albums (Schweizer Hitparade)	82
