= I Begin =

Studio album by God Seed
- Released: 23 October 2012
- Recorded: August 2012, various studios in Bergen and Oslo
- Genre: Black metal
- Length: 42:54
- Label: Indie
- Producer: God Seed

God Seed chronology
Live at Wacken (2012)	I Begin (2012)

I Begin is the only album by Norwegian black metal band God Seed. It was released on 23 October 2012 in North America and on 30 October 2012 in Europe.

== Background ==
Following the very public Gorgoroth name dispute, former frontman Gaahl teamed up with former bassist King ov Hell to form the black metal band God Seed. God Seed then released the Live at Wacken CD/DVD, which recreated Gorgoroth's Black Mass Krakow 2004 in its entirety. Between the name dispute and forming the new band, Gaahl retired from black metal. In an interview with Terrorizer's John Consterdine, he said, "I was basically just withdrawn from everything concerned with metal."

During his self-imposed break from music, Gaahl worked with a project called Wardruna, based around Nordic spiritualism and the runes of the Elder Futhark. When asked why he returned, he replied, "I got a bit of the taste back for it, but I don't know if it will last." He claims that the lyrics are based around "my love for creation and [to] express myself vocally through the music is something that comes up now and again."

== Track listing ==
All lyrics are written by Gaahl; all music is composed by Tom "King" Visnes, except where noted.

No.	Title	Music	Length
1.	"Awake"		4:43
2.	"This from the Past"		5:18
3.	"Alt Liv"		4:08
4.	"From the Running of Blood"		5:19
5.	"Hinstu Dagar"		4:55
6.	"Diversion 1" (Limited edition bonus track)		1:02
7.	"Aldrande Tre"	Lust Kilman	4:45
8.	"Lit"		5:17
9.	"The Wound"		4:45
10.	"Bloodline"	Geir Bratland	3:44
11.	"Diversion 2" (Limited edition bonus track)		0:30

== Critical reception ==
Professional ratings
Review scores
Source	Rating
About.com	4/5 stars
Allmusic	3.5/5 stars
Exclaim!	7/10
Pitchfork	7.1/10
Revolver	4/5 stars
Sputnik Music	4.5/5 stars

Allmusic's Eduardo Rivadavia said of the album, "the songs are tastefully arranged, no matter their inherent violence", and that it "simultaneously nods to the pair's past exploits and then breaks free of the restrictive B.M. aesthetic virtually demanded of Gorgoroth material." Pitchfork's Grayson Currin said, "It would be a stretch to call I Begin a breakthrough for a fresh quinet; it would be dismissive to not consider it perhaps as the start of one." About.com's Craig Hayes wrote, "Wayward and disobedient, I Begin contains the crucial black metal elements to secure God Seed's cold-blooded roots, but it reveals a band harnessing their will to power by determinedly ignoring constraints. That's no surprise given Gaahl and King's defiant ideologies, but I Begin requires you to be receptive to new ideas."

== Personnel ==
=== God Seed ===
- Gaahl – vocals (1–9)
- Stian "Sir" Kårstad – guitar (1–5, 7–9)
- Lust Kilman – guitar (1–5, 7–9)
- King ov Hell – bass (1–5, 7–9)
- Geir Bratland – keyboards, Noise (1–11)
- Kenneth Kapstad – drums (1–5, 7–10)

=== Additional personnel ===
- Herbrand Larsen (Enslaved) – vocals on "Hinstu Dagar"
- Alexander Jakobsen – vocals on "Alt Liv"
- Trym Hartmark Visnes – vocals on "Bloodline"
