= Gaahl =

Norwegian musician

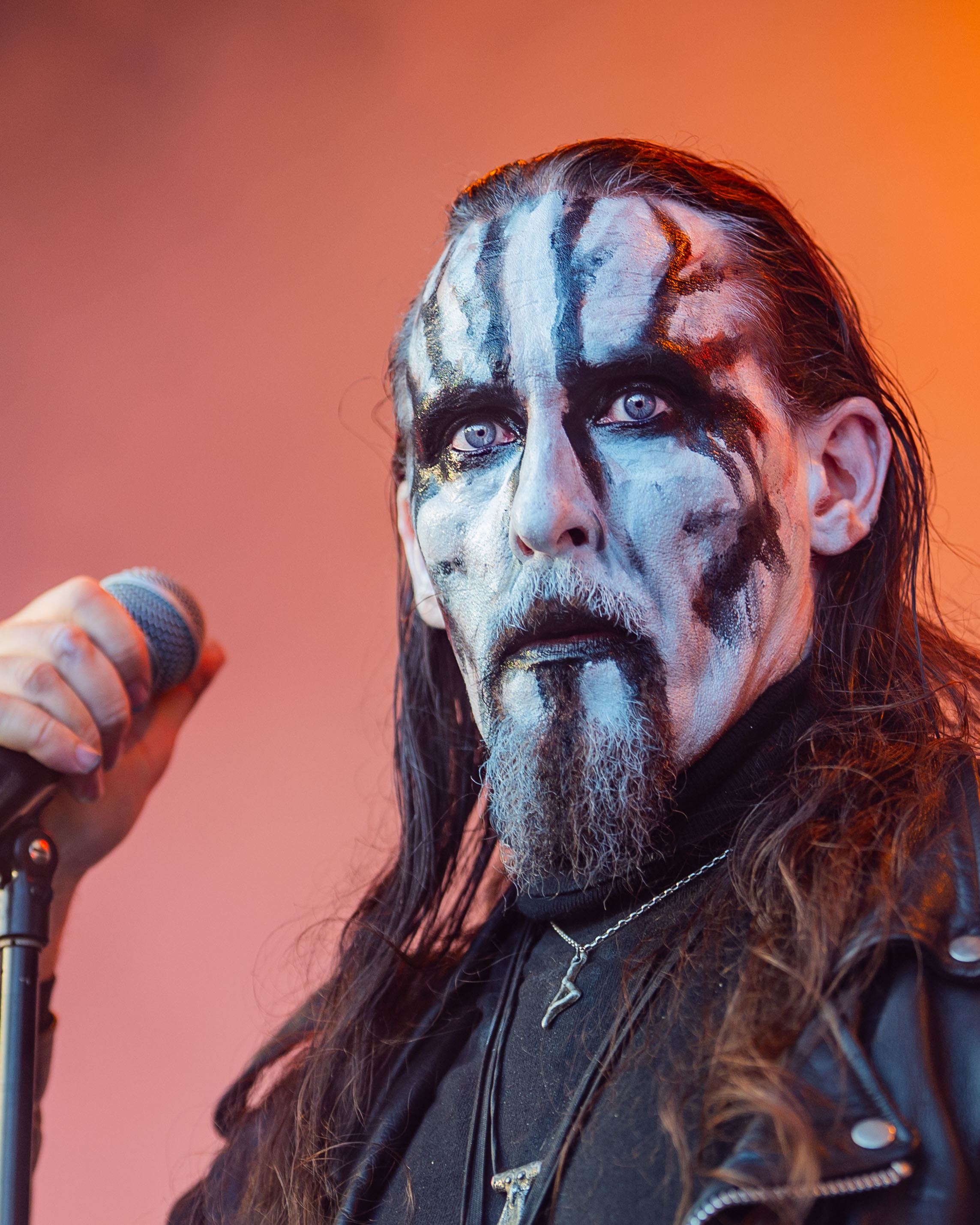
- Gaahl performing at Midgardsblot 2025

Background information
- Born: Kristian Eivind Espedal; 7 August 1975 (age 51); Sunnfjord, Norway
- Genres: Black metal, ambient, folk music
- Occupations: Singer, painter
- Years active: 1993–present
- Member of: Gaahlskagg, Trelldom, Sigfader, Gaahls Wyrd
- Formerly of: God Seed, Gorgoroth, Wardruna

Kristian Eivind Espedal (born 7 August 1975), better known by his stage name Gaahl, is a Norwegian vocalist. He is best known as the former frontman of Norwegian black metal band Gorgoroth. He is also the founder and lead vocalist of Trelldom and Gaahlskagg. Since leaving Gorgoroth, he has been involved with God Seed, Wardruna, and Gaahls Wyrd. He was the focus of the documentary True Norwegian Black Metal and also appeared in the film Flukt.

== Early life ==
Gaahl was born in 1975 in Sunnfjord, a district in Sogn og Fjordane county, Norway. He spent his youth living in a sparsely populated valley called Espedal in Fjaler Municipality. Gaahl and his family still have homes in the valley, although he now spends much of his time in Bergen.

== Career ==
=== Early career (1993–1998) ===
Gaahl became involved with black metal in 1993, when he co-formed the band Trelldom with guitarist Tyrant and bassist Taakeheim. They released a demo in March 1994, with Goat Pervertor on drums. Gaahl and Tyrant recorded and released Trelldom's first album, Til Evighet, in early 1995, with help from drummer Ole Nic. In 1998, they released the album Til et Annet with drummer Mutt. That year, Gaahl became involved with the bands Sigfader and Gaahlskagg. The former included Stian Lægreid (Skagg), Tarjei Øvrebotten (Goatboy), Jan Atle Lægreid (Thurzr), Einar Selvik (Kvitrafn) and Mutt. The latter included Skagg, Thurzr and Mutt. Sigfader and Gaahlskagg each released an EP in 1999.

=== Gorgoroth (1998–2007) ===
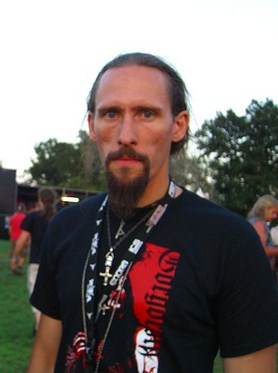
Gaahl in 2008

Gaahl joined Gorgoroth in 1998, and was first heard on their fourth album Destroyer, although he only sang on the title track. He made his live debut in May that year, when Gorgoroth played five dates in Germany alongside Cradle of Filth.

The first Gorgoroth album to feature Gaahl as main vocalist was Incipit Satan, recorded from July–October 1999. The music was entirely written by guitarists Infernus and Tormentor, while the lyrics were written by Infernus and Gaahl; the latter having written the lyrics for the title song and "Ein Eim av Blod og Helvetesild". This was also the first Gorgoroth album to feature elements of industrial, dark ambient, and noise music.

==== Imprisonment and legal controversy ====
In 2002, Gaahl was sentenced to 12 months in prison for an assault which took place in 2000, and was ordered to pay the victim 158,000 NOK (about US$25,300). Gorgoroth began recording their album Twilight of the Idols in May that year. Gaahl's imprisonment meant that he was unable to record his vocals until January 2003. The album was released in July that year.

In February 2004, Gorgoroth staged a concert in Kraków, Poland, which featured impaled sheep heads, satanic symbols, and a mock-crucifixion performed by naked models doused in blood. A police investigation took place with allegations of religious offense (which is prosecutable under Polish law) and cruelty to animals. Though these charges were considered, the band was not charged. The controversy led to the band being dropped from the Nuclear Blast Tour and the footage of the concert being confiscated by the police. Following this, Gorgoroth ended their contract with the label.

In May 2004, Gaahl again received a prison sentence, for aggravated assault. He appealed for a reduced sentence, and in February 2005 he was re-sentenced to fourteen months in prison and ordered to pay the victim 190,000 NOK (about US$30,400) in compensation. The incident happened in February 2002 during a late-night party at Gaahl's house in Espedal, when he became involved in a confrontation with a man. Gaahl was accused of severely beating the man, torturing him for long periods of time and collecting his blood into a cup and threatening to make him drink it. Gaahl said "I was the one who was attacked, but they think I punished him too hard. As I always say, when people cross my line and I let them know where the line is many steps before they cross it, and still they choose to cross it, then I will be the one to decide what their punishment will be". He also claimed to have given the man the cup "so that he would not make such a mess in my house with all the blood". In March 2006, Gaahl recorded vocals for Gorgoroth's next album, Ad Majorem Sathanas Gloriam. According to band members, he was in prison from April to December 2006.

==== Post-prison ====
In January 2007, Gaahl was the focus of a documentary called True Norwegian Black Metal. It was shown in five parts on vbs.tv, the broadcast network of Vice Magazine, in April. In it, Gaahl offered the film-makers a tour of his home in Espedal and the surrounding countryside. The documentary was produced by photographer Peter Beste, who also starred in it.

In May 2007, Gaahl appeared on the third Trelldom album, Til Minne. Gaahl was the band's only founding member to appear on the album, which featured guitarist Valgard, bassist Stian, drummer Are and hardingfele player Egil Furenes.

In October 2007, Gaahl and King ov Hell tried to remove founding member Infernus from Gorgoroth. This began the Gorgoroth name dispute.

=== Post-Gorgoroth (2008–present) ===
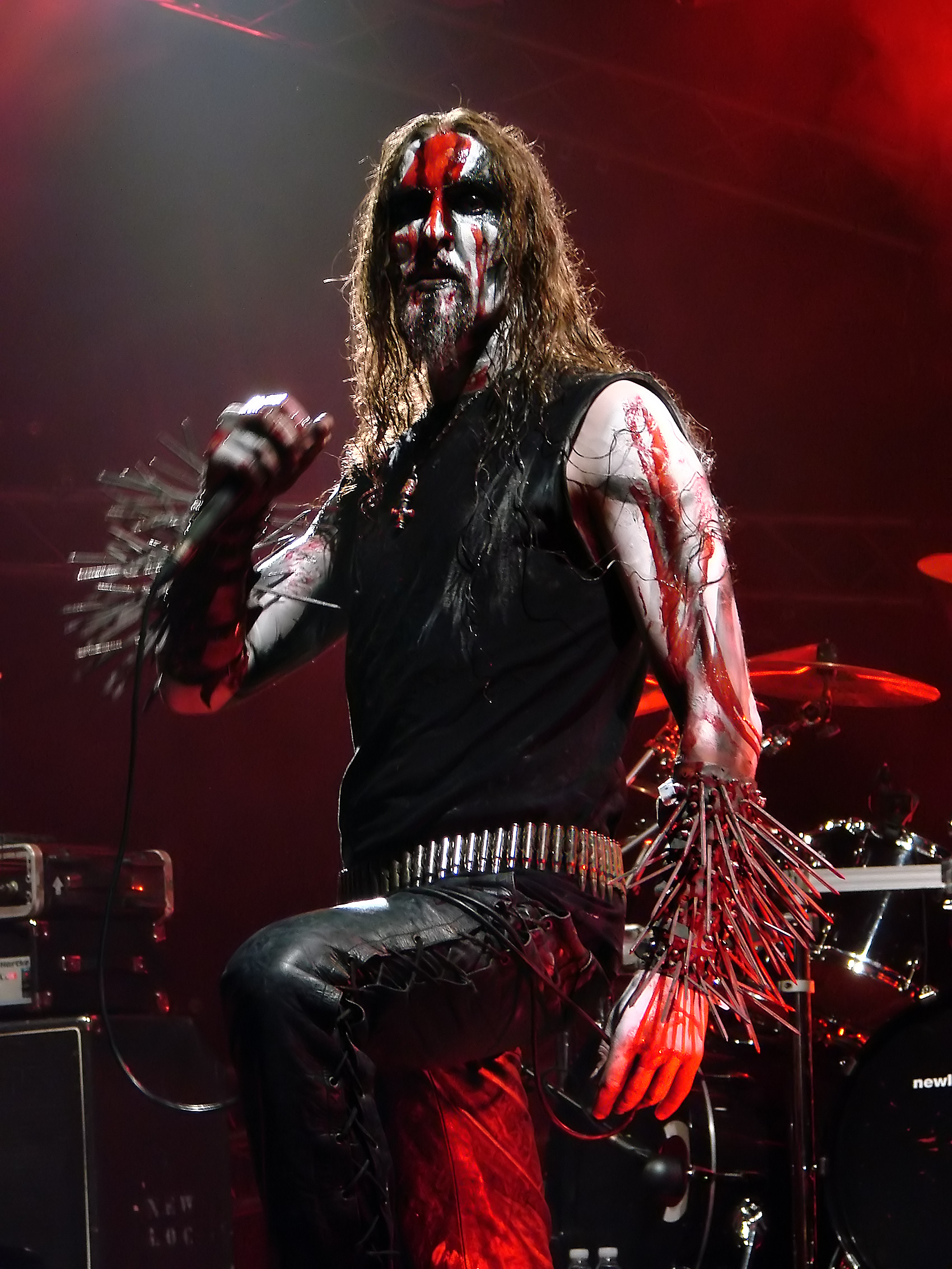
Gaahl at Hellfest 2009

In July 2008, Gaahl revealed in an online interview that he was involved in the launch of Wynjo, an upcoming fashion collection for women, together with Norwegian modeling agent Dan De Vero and designer Sonja Wu. At the same time, it was also revealed that he and De Vero had had a "close relationship" since 2006. It was stated that they were no longer a couple but remained good friends. In an interview for the November 2008 issue of Rock Hard, Gaahl confirmed his homosexuality.

Shortly thereafter, De Vero said that he had received threats from black metal fans, both at his door and by phone and email. It was also alleged that a fight had erupted backstage at the 2008 Wacken Open Air, triggered by homophobic remarks. Allegedly, the person who made the remarks had to be hospitalized. However, Gaahl denied that anyone had ever "said anything derogatory" to him in person. When asked by the webzine FaceCulture if he thinks people will see him and his music differently now that he has publicly acknowledged his homosexuality, Gaahl answered:

"Mankind is known to be narrow-minded, so ... maybe some [will have a negative reaction]. But I guess it will even out the score in a way. I think it will be positive for some and negative for some. It's always good to have some negative as well. Otherwise you would end up with equality and equality is the worst thing in the world. Equality is stagnation. It doesn't let anything grow. It holds back."

In March 2009 the name dispute ended when Oslo City District Court ruled that Infernus was the rightful owner of the Gorgoroth name. It also found that by trying to oust Infernus, Gaahl and King had instead excluded themselves from the band. That month, Gaahl and King assumed the name God Seed.

In early 2009, Gaahl spent two months in Spain. King stated in an interview that Gaahl had been spending time in Spain working on lyrics and vocal arrangements for the debut God Seed album. However, in another interview in April 2009, King stated that:

"We have recorded everything in the studio and are just waiting for Gaahl to put vocals on it. So we have only vocals and the final mix to go before it's all done. It's sometimes a nightmare to work with him in the studio because of the pride he puts into the smallest details. If he's not in the right mood or doesn't find the correct words we get nothing done. At times I've spent days in the studio counting seconds with nothing happening. It's the same way now, but I know in the end the result will be unique and powerful."

In summer 2009, God Seed performed at Hellfest Summer Open Air in June and With Full Force in July. In August, Gaahl revealed that he had quit the band. His bandmate King later clarified that Gaahl had in fact chosen to retire from metal music for the time being. King put the band 'on hold' as a result.

In January 2010, Gaahl was hired by Den Nationale Scene in Bergen to play the role of the Norse god Heimdall, son of Odin, in Svartediket, a performance for the 2010 Bergen International Festival. This caused controversy due to Gaahl's anti-Christian standpoint and support for church burnings. The Bishop of Bjørgvin spoke against Gaahl's involvement.

Gaahl appeared in the 2012 Norwegian historical action-thriller film Flukt (Escape), starring as archer 'Grim'.

In 2012, God Seed reformed and released their debut studio album I Begin. The band later played their final show in August 2015.

In September 2015, Gaahl announced his new band, Gaahls Wyrd, who played their first live show at the Blekkmetal Festival in Norway on 13 November 2015. In regards to forming the new band, Gaahl stated:

"I'm very pleased with what me and Tom have done together. We've created a lot of good songs, but I think the difference between us is probably the reason why I've started this new band. I've made a lot of my favourite songs that I've created in God Seed and I've brought with me one of these characters from that band."

In 2024 he featured as a guest musician on Kati Rán's SÁLA album.

Besides his musical career, Gaahl is also a painter. He has an exhibition of his paintings in the Galleri Fjalar in his hometown Bergen.

== Personal life and beliefs ==
Gaahl is gay. He is an artist, and has had some of his paintings on exhibit. He is "against drugs and the drug-user mentality."

Gaahl is a practitioner of Norse Shamanism and can often be seen wearing a Mjölnir pendant.

=== Christianity and Satanism ===
Gaahl is strongly opposed to Christianity. He has often been mistaken as a Satanist, but objects to being labeled as such. In a 1995 interview, he stated: "I am my own God as I am my own Satan. So I'm not a Satanist judging by those terms." He jokingly added: "Maybe you could call it Gaahlism." He reiterated this belief in the documentary True Norwegian Black Metal when he said: "The god within yourself is the only true god." In an interview for the documentary Metal: A Headbanger's Journey—at which time he was Gorgoroth's vocalist—Gaahl was asked what inspired the band's music, to which his sole reply was "Satan." When asked what Satan represented, he again answered with a single word: "Freedom."

When asked whether he was influenced by Friedrich Nietzsche in his beliefs and his use of the "superman" terminology, Gaahl answered: "For me he doesn't mean anything and I don't have a lot of things in common with him. Personally, I focus on myself, on my own thoughts."

Gaahl has expressed opposition to the Church of Satan, describing it as a group of "weak people flocking like rats, afraid of standing alone" and adding: "Anton LaVey and his followers are incredibly ridiculous. It's all so childish. I will not waste my breath on discussing them."

=== Church burning controversy and black metal ===
Regarding black metal, Gaahl sees individuality as the most important aspect of the genre. He has described black metal as "the depiction of honesty without compromise" and "a war for those who hear the whisper." When asked in the documentary Metal: A Headbanger's Journey (2005) for his thoughts on the church burnings associated with the early Norwegian black metal scene, Gaahl answered:

"Church burnings are, of course, a thing that I support one hundred percent. It should have been done much more, and will be done much more in the future. We have to remove every trace [of] what Christianity, and the semitic roots, have to offer this world."

However, in a controversial interview from 1995 he also said of the church burnings:

"Well, personally I don't mind it at all, but I fear that it might cause among people fear of nihilism and [the] anti-Christian views that black metal represents, and in that way lead neutral people to succumbing to Christendom because that is what they accept and don't want to lose. I think it's the wrong way to proceed."

=== Politics ===
Gaahl maintains that he has no deep set of political beliefs, and that his circle of friends includes both right-wingers and left-wingers.

"These are things related to the past and the environment I found myself in at the time. In the early '90s, there were all these different youth gangs in Norway and one thing led to another. I was involved in gang fights and had false friends [...] There was no political disposition – not with me nor any of my friends. But you had to profess allegiance to a certain group if you wanted to defend yourself and not get your ass kicked. [...] But there have definitely been changes and an evolution in my thinking. I'm a different person today."

In a 2013 interview, Gaahl said on freedom of speech: "You should be able to say whatever you want, it's the only way to evolve. If we deny anyone an opinion, we cannot grow [...] However, people must also be able to face the consequences of speaking their minds. [...] What kind of a person are you if you don't let people speak up against you?"

== Discography ==
Year	Title	Band	Notes
1994	Disappearing of the Burning Moon (demo)	Trelldom	
1995	Til Evighet	Trelldom	
1998	Til et Annet	Trelldom	
1998	Destroyer	Gorgoroth	vocals on "Destroyer"
1999	Sigfaders hevner (demo)	Sigfader	
1999	Split With Stormfront	Gaahlskagg	
2000	Erotic Funeral	Gaahlskagg	
2000	Incipit Satan	Gorgoroth	
2003	Twilight of the Idols	Gorgoroth	
2006	Ad Majorem Sathanas Gloriam	Gorgoroth	
2006	Secht	Secht	additional vocals
2007	Til Minne	Trelldom	
2008	Black Mass Krakow 2004	Gorgoroth	live recording from February 2004
2008	True Norwegian Black Metal – Live in Grieghallen	Gorgoroth	live recording from 2007
2009	Runaljóð - gap var Ginnunga	Wardruna	
2009	Skandinavisk misantropi	Skitliv	additional vocals on "Hollow Devotion"
2012	Live at Wacken	God Seed	live recording from Wacken Open Air, August 2008
2012	I Begin	God Seed	
2013	Runaljóð - Yggdrasil	Wardruna	
2017	Bergen Nov '15	Gaahls Wyrd	live recording from 13 November 2015
2019	GastiR - Ghosts Invited	Gaahls Wyrd	debut album of Gaahls Wyrd
2021	The Humming Mountain	Gaahls Wyrd	EP
2024	...by the Shadows...	Trelldom	
2025	Braiding the Stories	Gaahls Wyrd	

== Filmography ==
- 2005: Metal: A Headbanger's Journey (documentary)
- 2007: True Norwegian Black Metal (documentary)
- 2012: Flukt ("Escape") (drama) – as "Grim"
- 2022: Heavy Metal Saved My Life, Episode 2 "Queer" (documentary)

== Gallery ==
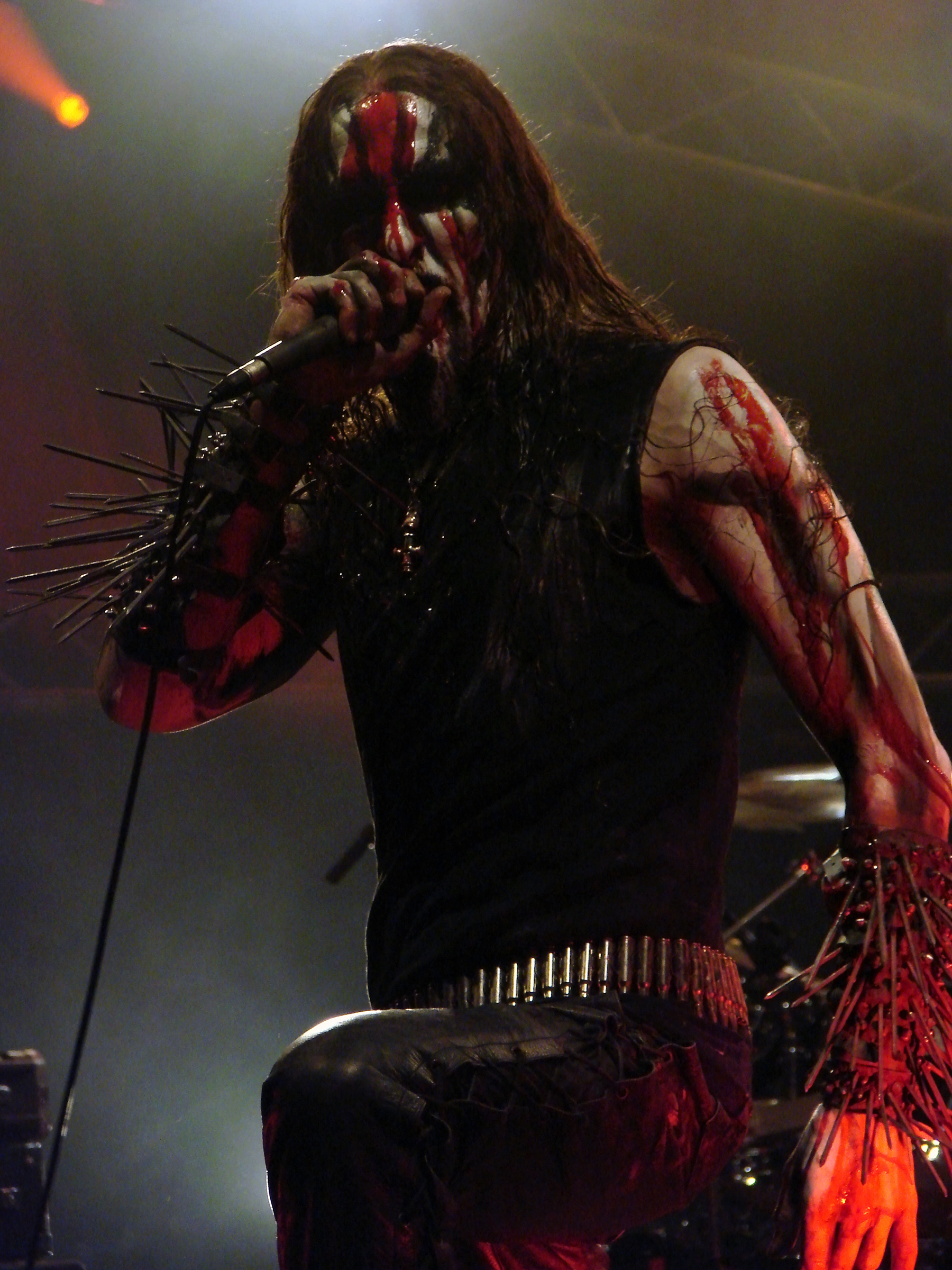
Gaahl with God Seed (2009)

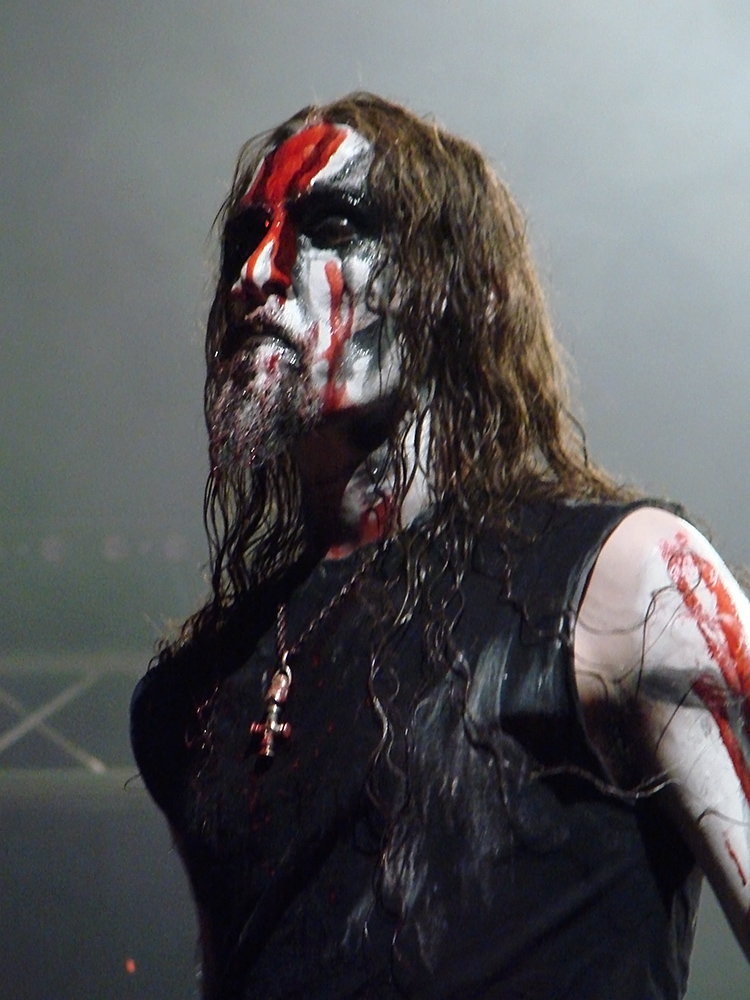
Gaahl with God Seed (2009)

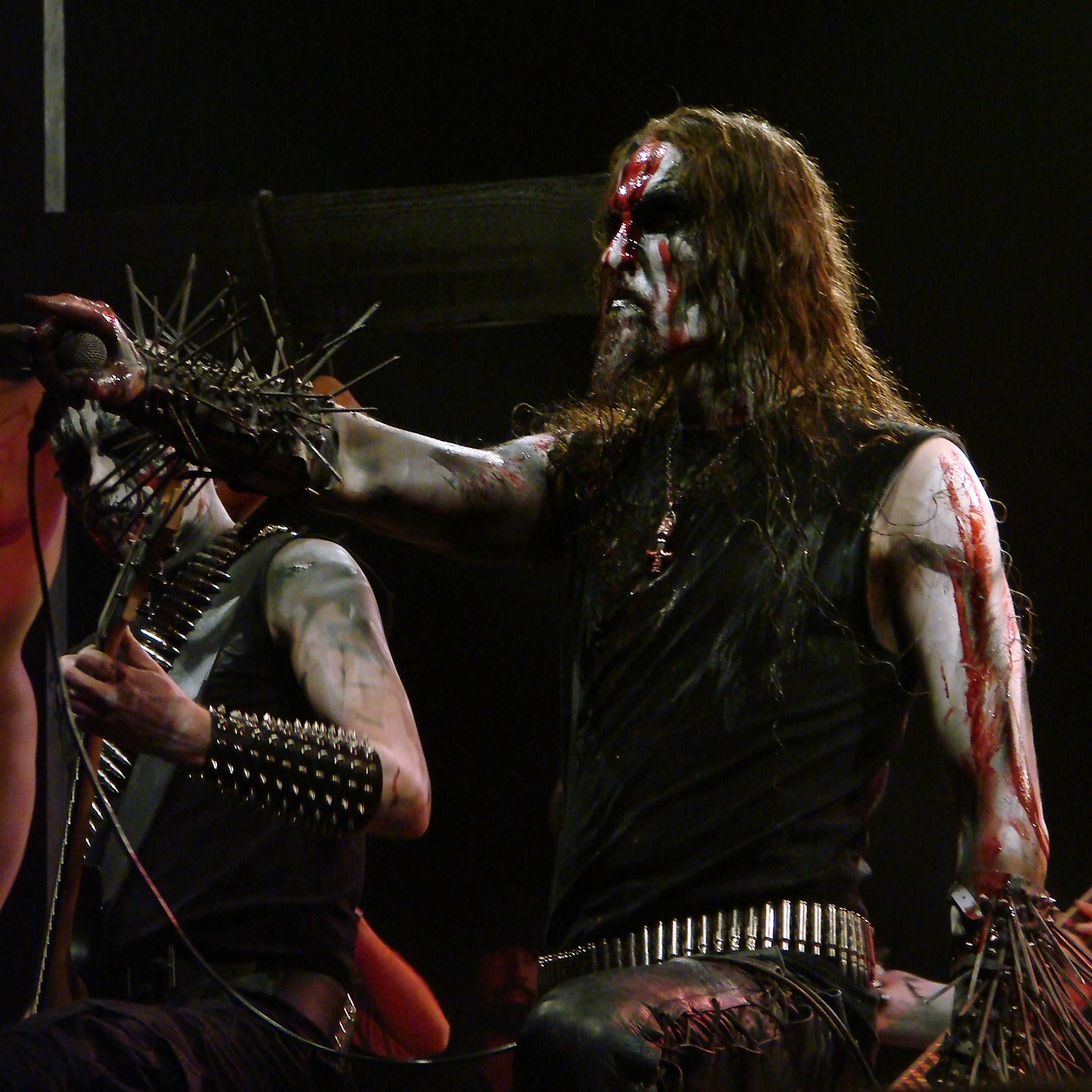
Gaahl and Teloch with God Seed (2009)

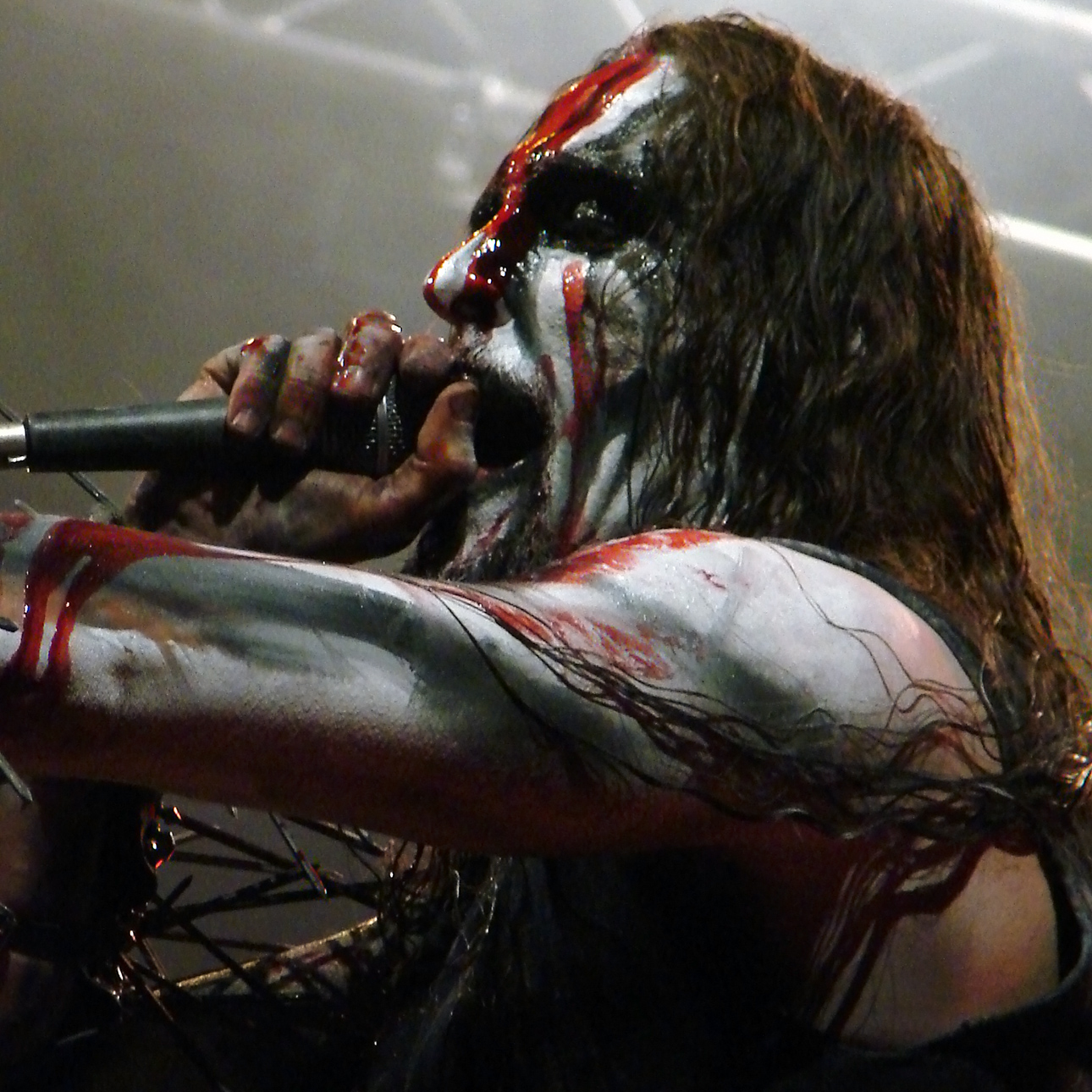
Gaahl with God Seed (2009)

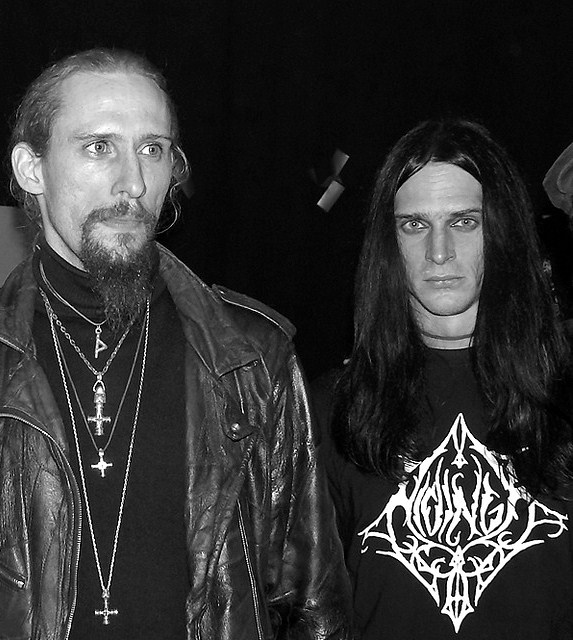
Gaahl (left) with King
