= Escape (2012 Norwegian film) =

- Film poster
- Norwegian: Flukt
- Directed by: Roar Uthaug
- Written by: Thomas Moldestad
- Produced by: Martin Sundland; Are Heidenstrom
- Starring: Ingrid Bolsø Berdal; Isabel Christine Andreasen; Milla Olin
- Cinematography: John Christian Rosenlund
- Edited by: Christian Siebenherz
- Music by: Magnus Beite
- Production company: Fantefilm
- Distributed by: Nordisk Film
- Release date: 20 September 2012 (Slash Film Festival)
- Running time: 76 minutes
- Country: Norway
- Language: Norwegian
- Budget: NOK 16 million

Escape (Norwegian: Flukt) is a 2012 thriller film directed by Roar Uthaug. It stars Isabel Christine Andreasen and Milla Olin as girls in 14th century Norway who must escape bandits led by Ingrid Bolsø Berdal. It premiered at the Slash Film Festival and was released in Norway in September 2012.

== Plot ==
In fourteenth century Norway, 19-year-old Signe, her younger brother, and her parents travel through lands made dangerous by the lawlessness following the Black Death. Bandits led by Dagmar kill her entire family; Dagmar herself murders Signe's brother Tormod as she watches helplessly. Before the bandits can kill Signe, Dagmar stops them and orders them to take her prisoner. At their camp, Signe meets Frigg, a young girl that Dagmar has adopted. When Frigg shows kindness to Signe, Dagmar chastises her and says that Signe deserves no compassion, as her people have driven them to banditry.

Arvid, Dagmar's lover, stops Loke from raping Signe. As the others watch Arvid and Loke fight, Signe strains to recover Loke's dropped knife. Frigg notices and alerts Dagmar, who tasks Frigg with Signe's punishment, cutting off a finger. When Signe calls Dagmar a witch, Dagmar gloats that she will soon allow the men to rape Signe, as she wants Frigg to have a younger sister. Instead of cutting off Signe's finger, Frigg frees her. As the others sleep, the two girls sneak out of the camp. The bandits wake and give chase, though Signe and Frigg evade them in the nearby forest.

One bandit dies when Signe destroys a log bridge as he attempts to cross it. Dagmar stops them from killing Signe, and the girls escape as the bandits search for another crossing point. Loke finds them at an outcrop, and Signe kills him as he again attempts to rape her. When the bandits find Loke's body, Dagmar tells them to spare Frigg's life but allows them to do what they wish to Signe. Meanwhile, the girls find a hunter's cabin, and, assuming it abandoned, camp there overnight. The hunter Trygve is surprised to find them there when he returns, but he feeds them and teaches Signe how to kill a bear with a spear.

When he learns that they're fleeing Dagmar's bandit group, he tells them that Dagmar was subjected to ordeal by water after her village was hit by the plague. Both of Dagmar's children died, and she barely escaped with her life. When Dagmar shows up at the cabin, Trygve attempts to reason with her, but she becomes enraged when Arvid suggests they allow Signe and Frigg to escape. Dagmar kills Arvid and Trygve is killed by the two remaining bandits Grim and Skjalg. Meanwhile the girls escape through the rear. The bandits eventually corner the girls at a cliff. Dagmar promises to allow Signe to live if Frigg surrenders. Signe, knowing that Dagmar will not keep her word, jumps off the cliff just as Dagmar signals Grim to kill her.

Signe survives her fall, and, after dreaming of her murdered family, buries Trygve. After retrieving his spear, she goads Skjalg into chasing her and uses it to impale him as Trygve taught her. Her next trap fails to kill Grim, and she is forced to use a bow and arrow to shoot him, a weapon that her father had unsuccessfully attempted to teach her earlier. Her first shot misses. Remaining calm, she hits and kills Grim with her second shot. Dagmar uses Frigg as bait to lure Signe. As Signe frees the bound girl, Dagmar attacks. As Dagmar drowns Signe in a river, Frigg calls out to her, addressing Dagmar as her mother. Dagmar turns toward her joyously, and Signe kills Dagmar while her back is turned. Together, the girls bury Signe's family, and Signe hands Frigg a necklace she made for her brother. When Frigg asks what the rune on it means, Signe explains that it means "family".

== Cast ==
- Isabel Christine Andreasen as Signe
- Ingrid Bolsø Berdal as Dagmar
- Milla Olin as Frigg
- Tobias Santelmann as Arvid
- Bjørn Moan as Loke
- Hallvard Holmen as Harald
- Iren Reppen as Synnøve
- Hans Jacob Sand as Trygve
- Martin Slaatto as Brynjar
- Kristian Espedal as Grim
- Richard Skog as Skjalg
- Eirik Holden as Tormod

== Production ==
Shooting took place in Sirdal Municipality, Norway. The bandits were intended to be surviving followers of the old Æsir-religion, but all references to this were deleted from the final film. The scene where Signe and Frigg climb across the chasm was filmed using two meter-high rocks at the side of a regular road and the chasm was added digitally in post-production.

== Release ==
Escape premiered at the 2012 Slash Film Festival on 20 September and had its Norwegian theatrical premiere on 27 September.

== Reception ==
Alissa Simon of Variety wrote: "This simple but adrenaline-fueled survival tale boasts impressively muscular direction from Norwegian director Roar Uthaug". Thomas Spurlin of DVD Talk rated it 3/5 stars and wrote: "The visual tone, raw energy, and an absorbing pair of performances from Isabel Christine Andreasen and Ingrid Bolso Berdal elevate the simple-focused depiction of two girls' escape, a tense rush through picturesque landscapes that compensates for unlikelihood with sheer edge". Bill Gibron of DVD Verdict wrote: "If you want something a bit different in the one against nature subgenre, Escape will entertain. Just get all images of Katniss Everdeen and her kid killing contest out of your mind and you'll enjoy this".
