= Trelldom =

Norwegian black metal band

- Logo

Background information
- Origin: Sunnfjord, Norway
- Genre: Black metal
- Years active: 1992–present
- Labels: Head Not Found; Hammerheart; Regain; Prophecy
- Members: Gaahl; Sir; Valgard
- Website: trelldom.no

Trelldom is a Norwegian black metal band, formed in 1992.

The band released its third studio album, Til Minne... in 2007 through Regain Records.

== Line-up ==
- Gaahl - Vocals (also in Wardruna, Gaahlskagg, Sigfader, God Seed)
- Sir - Bass (also in God Seed)
- Valgard -Guitar

== Discography ==
- 1995 Til Evighet…, Head Not Found
- 1998 Til et Annet…, Hammerheart Records
- 2007 Til Minne…, Regain Records
- 2024 ...by the Shadows..., Prophecy Productions
- 2026 ...by the Word..., Prophecy Productions
