= Wardruna =

Norwegian folk music group

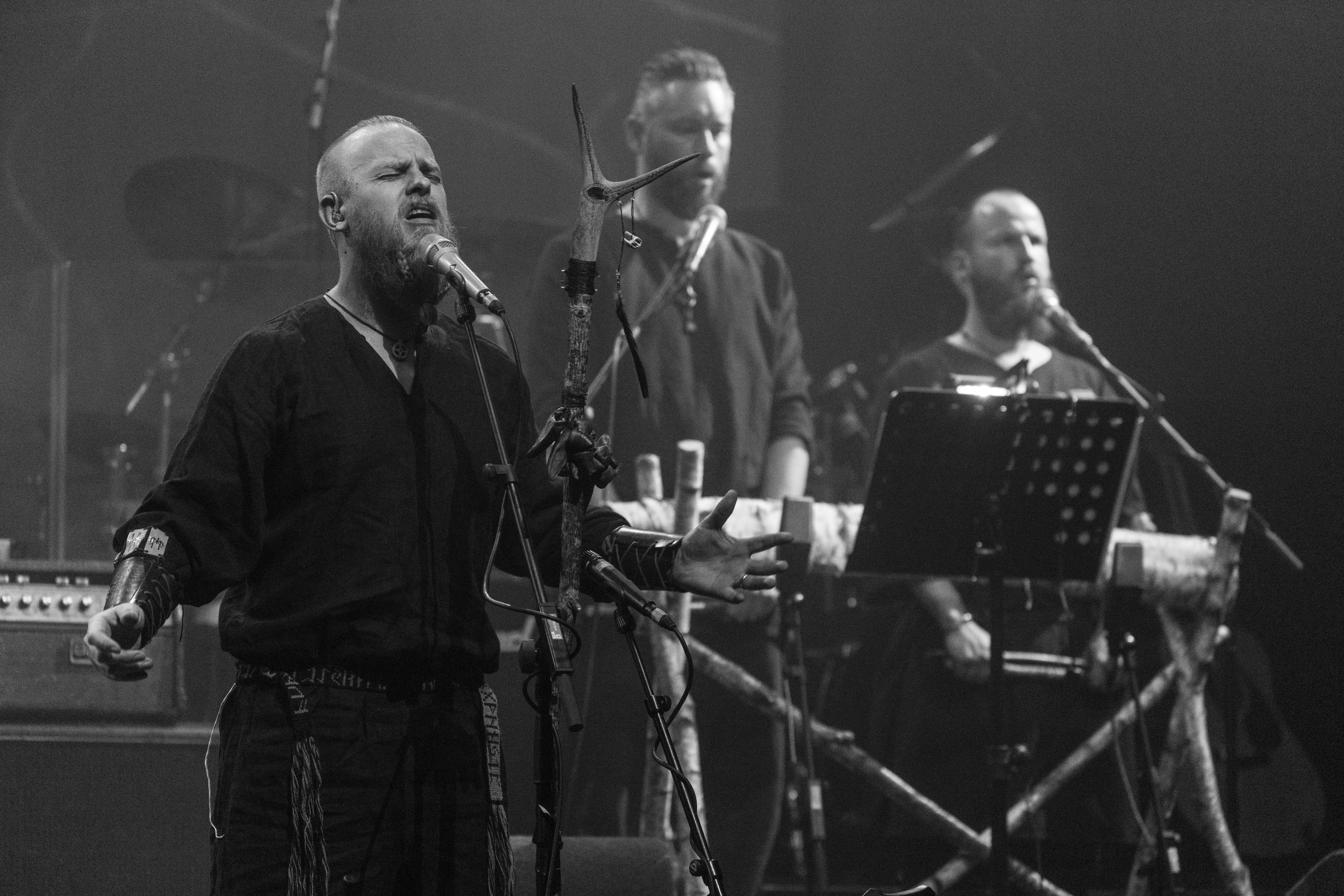
- Wardruna performing in 2015

Background information
- Origin: Bergen, Norway
- Genres: Nordic folk; ambient; dark folk
- Years active: 2003–present
- Labels: Indie Recordings; By Norse Music; Columbia Records (since 2019)
- Spinoff of: Gorgoroth
- Members: Einar Selvik; Lindy-Fay Hella; Arne Sandvoll; HC Dalgaard; Eilif Gundersen; John Stenersen
- Past members: Gaahl; Jørgen Nyrønning
- Website: wardruna.com

Wardruna is a Norwegian music group formed in 2003 by Einar Selvik along with Gaahl and Lindy-Fay Hella. They create musical renditions of Norse cultural and esoteric traditions and make significant use of Nordic historical and traditional instruments, including deer-hide frame drums, flutes, kraviklyra, mouth harp, goat horn, and lur. Non-traditional instruments, like the Finnish jouhikko, and other sources of sound like trees, rocks, water, and torches are also used.

The band have released six full-length albums, the first three based on Norse runes, the fourth based on the sayings of Odin from the Völuspá and other old Norse sources. The name Wardruna means "the guardian of secrets" or "she who whispers".

== History ==
Wardruna was formed in 2003. Selvik and Gaahl were both previously members of Gorgoroth, appearing together on the album Twilight of the Idols and the live DVD Black Mass Krakow 2004. Selvik had also recorded with other projects including Det Hedenske Folk, Bak de Syv Fjell, Jotunspor, Sahg, Dead to this World, Skuggsjá, and Faun. Gaahl also recorded with Trelldom, Gaahlskagg, and God Seed.

The group's debut album, Runaljod – Gap Var Ginnunga, was released on 19 January 2009 by Indie Recordings and followed by Runaljod – Yggdrasil on 15 March 2013.

In 2014, Selvik announced on the group's official Facebook page that they would take part in composing the score for season 2 of Vikings along with Trevor Morris. He later appeared as an actor on the show. In 2015, Gaahl left Wardruna on amicable terms.

Wardruna's third album, Runaljod – Ragnarok, was released on 21 October 2016. Thanks in part to the success of Vikings, the album debuted at No. 1 on Billboard's World Albums chart.

In August 2017, Wardruna headlined the 20th alternative music, folk music, and experimental music festival Mėnuo Juodaragis in Dūburys Lake, Lithuania. In early 2018, they embarked on their first tour of North America.

The band's fourth album, the acoustic Skald, was released on 23 November 2018.

In October 2019, Wardruna announced they had signed to major labels Sony Music/Columbia Records. The band released their fifth studio album in January 2021, named Kvitravn, which means "white raven". This was followed by the live album Kvitravn – First Flight of the White Raven in early 2022.

Wardruna's tours for 2020 and 2021 were cancelled due to the COVID-19 pandemic. The band returned to touring in 2022, with European and North American shows as well as a performance at Midgardsblot.

The band launched their 2024/2025 world tour at Red Rocks Amphitheatre in Colorado, US. In January 2025, they released their sixth studio album, titled Birna.

== Reception ==
Jonathan Selzer of Metal Hammer magazine described Wardruna's music as "a conjunction of the earthy, the organic and the ethereal" with "runic-based rites inhabiting a frequency that once heard have always seemed just adjacent to everyday consciousness". Hannah May Kilroy of Kerrang! magazine wrote that "Wardruna may be at odds with the modern world, but, perhaps, they are exactly what the modern world needs."

== Band members ==
Current

- Einar "Kvitrafn" Selvik – vocals, all instruments, composer
- Lindy-Fay Hella – vocals, flute
- Arne Sandvoll – backing vocals, percussion
- HC Dalgaard – backing vocals, percussion, drums
- Eilif Gundersen – horns, flutes
- John Stenersen – moraharpa

Past

- Gaahl – vocals
- Jørgen Nyrønning

== Discography ==
- Runaljod – Gap Var Ginnunga (2009)
- Runaljod – Yggdrasil (2013)
- Runaljod – Ragnarok (2016)
- Skald (2018)
- Kvitravn (2021)
- Kvitravn – First Flight of the White Raven (live, 2022)
- Birna (2025)

== See also ==
- Neopagan music
- Heilung
- Danheim
- SKÁLD
