= Einar Selvik =

Norwegian musician

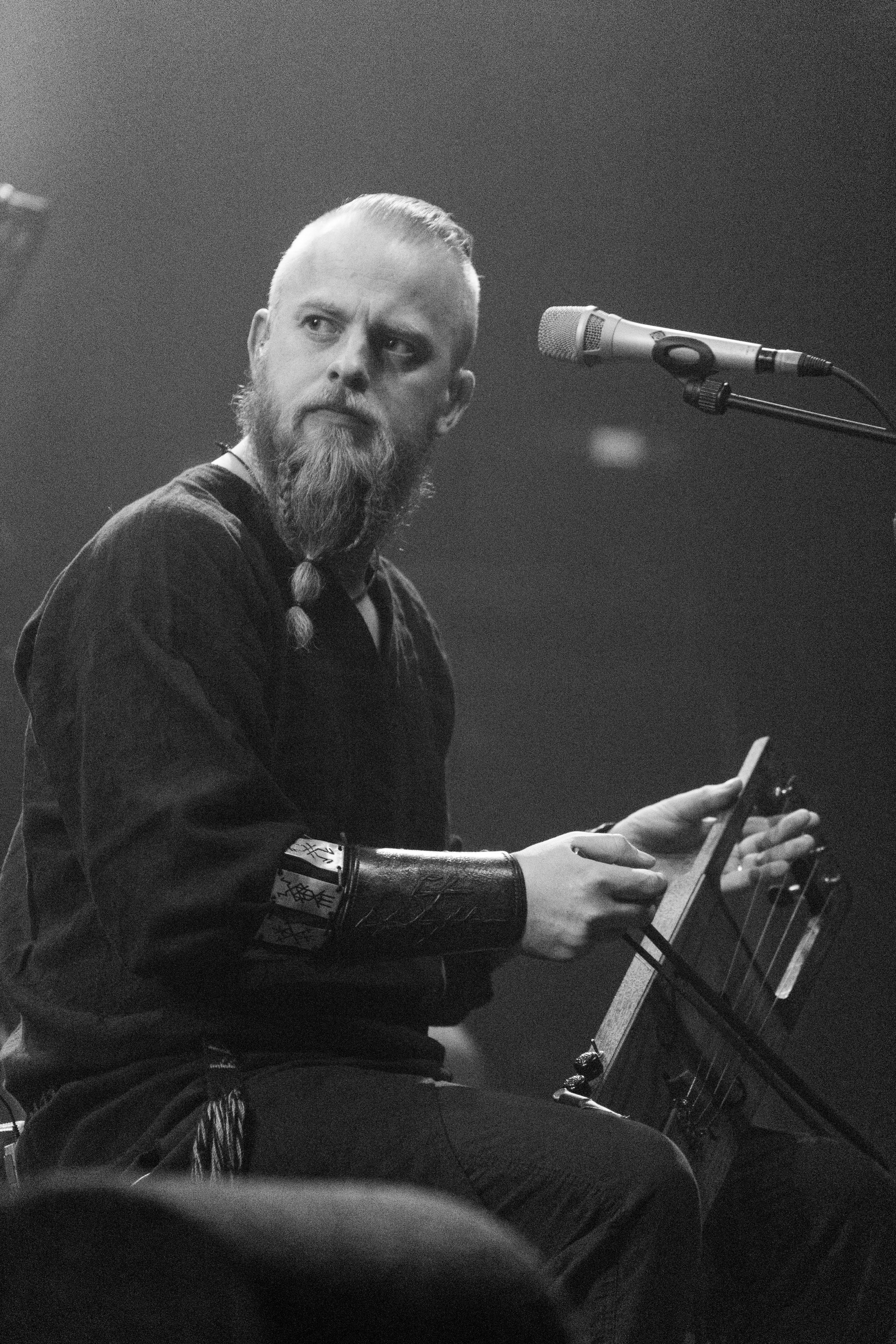
- Kvitrafn in concert with Wardruna in 2015

Background information
- Also known as: Kvitrafn
- Born: 18 November 1979 (age 46); Osterøy Municipality, Norway
- Genres: Nordic folk; ambient; black metal; heavy metal; thrash metal; folk metal
- Occupations: Musician; composer
- Instruments: Vocals; guitar; bass; keyboards; drums; kravik lyre; bukkehorn; talharpa
- Years active: 1995–present
- Label: By Norse Music
- Member of: Wardruna
- Formerly of: Gorgoroth; Jotunspor; Sahg; Dead to this World
- Website: https://www.facebook.com/einar.selvik

Einar Selvik (born 18 November 1979), also known by his stage name Kvitrafn ("white raven"), is a Norwegian multi-instrumentalist musician best known for being the drummer of black metal band Gorgoroth from 2000 to 2004, and for fronting the Nordic folk project Wardruna, founded in 2002. Selvik and Wardruna earned international prominence for contributing to the soundtrack and score of the television show Vikings. Selvik is a founder of By Norse, a platform to support Norse and Norse-related art, music, literature, film and culture.

== Musical career ==
On 1 March 2016, A Piece for Mind & Mirror by Skuggsjá, a collaboration between Selvik and Enslaved's Ivar Bjørnson, was announced and streamed. Commissioned by the Norwegian government for the 200th anniversary of the Norwegian Constitution, the album tells the history of Norway, and was released by Season of Mist on 11 March.

Selvik has also recorded with other projects including Det Hedenske Folk, Bak de Syv Fjell, Jotunspor, Sahg, Dead to this World and Faun. He worked on the soundtrack for Assassin's Creed Valhalla and collaborated with Riot Games for the theme song of Volibear, a League of Legends character.

== Personal life ==
Einar Selvik was born and grew up on Osterøy Municipality, a large inland island near Bergen on the west coast of Norway. He became interested in pre-Christian viking culture in his early adolescence after discovering an old book on runes. Selvik worked as a kindergarten assistant prior to Wardruna's breakthrough.

Selvik is an adherent of modern Paganism characterized by animism. In a 2017 interview with Morgenbladet, he talked about his worldview: "I am a strong supporter of individual responsibility. No one died for my sins. This is a slightly pagan body of thought: the gods help those who help themselves. It mirrors that you are your own god, that it is your responsibility how you behave, what you contribute in this world".

== Discography ==
=== With Gorgoroth ===
- Twilight of the Idols (2003)
- Black Mass Krakow 2004 (2008)

=== With Wardruna ===
- Runaljod - Gap Var Ginnunga (2009)
- Runaljod - Yggdrasil (2013)
- Runaljod - Ragnarok (2016)
- Skald (2018)
- Kvitravn (2021)
- Birna (2025)

=== With Jotunspor ===
- Gleipnirs Smeder (2006)

=== With Sahg ===
- I (2006)

=== With Dead to this World ===
- First Strike for Spiritual Renewance (2007)

=== With Jesper Kyd and Sarah Schachner ===
- Assassin's Creed Valhalla: Out of the North (2020)
- Assassin's Creed Valhalla: The Ravens Saga (2020)
- Assassin's Creed Valhalla: The Weft of Spears (2020)

=== As Ivar Bjørnson and Einar Selvik ===
- Skuggsjá (2016)
- Hugsjá (2018)
- Hardanger (2021) (Single)

=== As Einar Selvik ===
- Snake Pit Poetry (2017)
- Volibear, The Relentless Storm (2020) (Single)
