= God Seed =

Norwegian black metal band

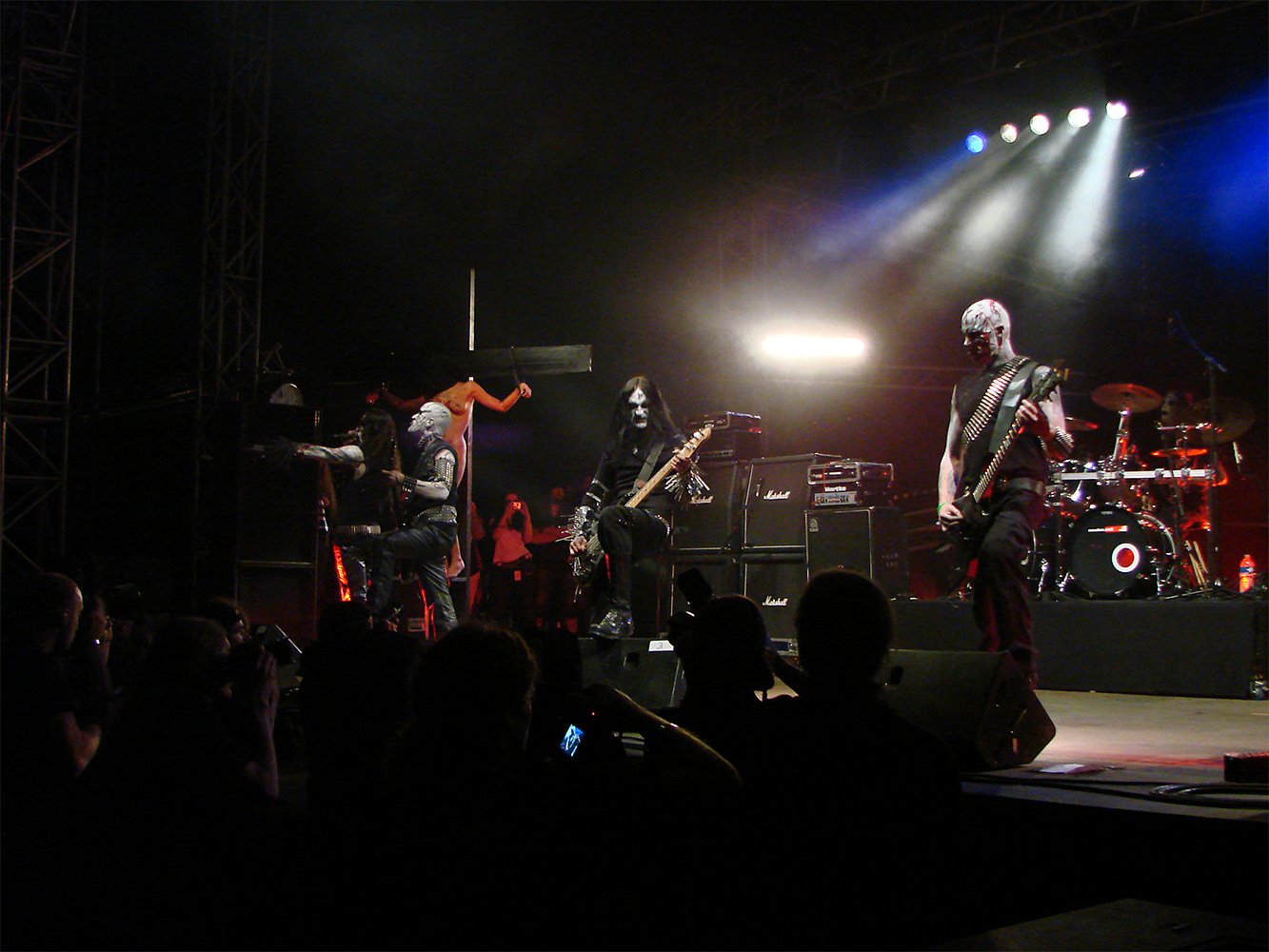
- God Seed at Hellfest 2009

Background information
- Origin: Bergen, Norway
- Genre: Black metal
- Years active: 2008–2009, 2012–2015
- Label: Indie Recordings
- Members: King ov Hell; Gaahl; Geir Bratland; Stian "Sir" Kårstad; Lust Kilman; Kenneth Kapstad

God Seed was a Norwegian black metal band based in Bergen. Former Gorgoroth members Gaahl and King ov Hell adopted the name in March 2009, following the Gorgoroth name dispute. After performing a few shows as God Seed, Gaahl left the band in July 2009, and it was put on hold. King finished the music for God Seed's first album with vocalist Shagrath, and released it as Ov Hell. Gaahl rejoined God Seed in 2012. In January that year, they released the live album Live at Wacken, and in October they released their first studio album, I Begin.

== History ==
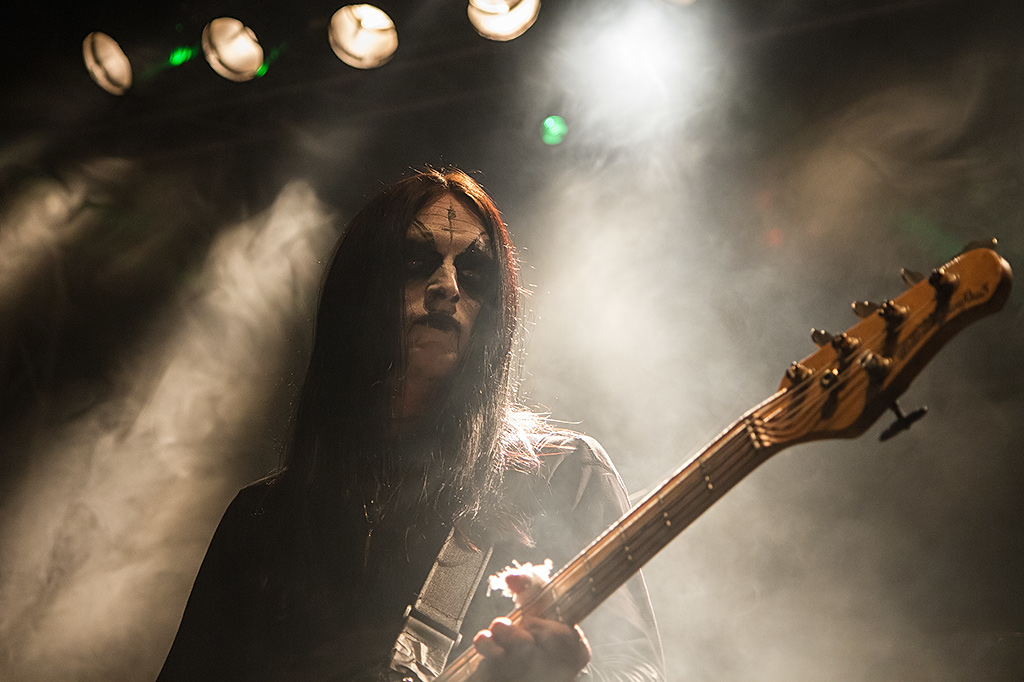
King ov Hell

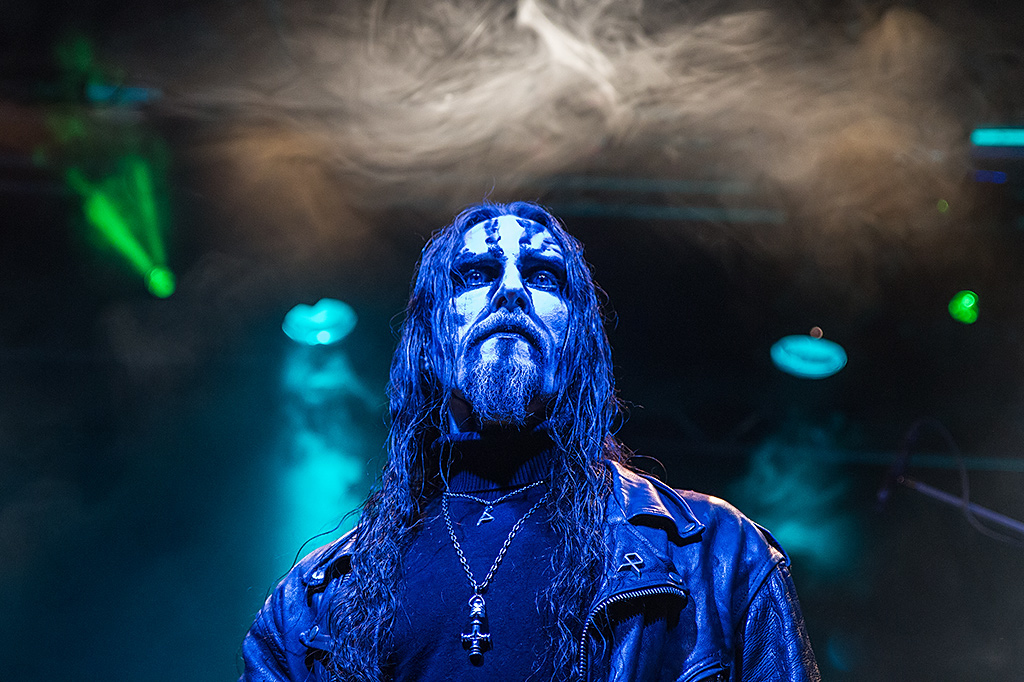
Gaahl

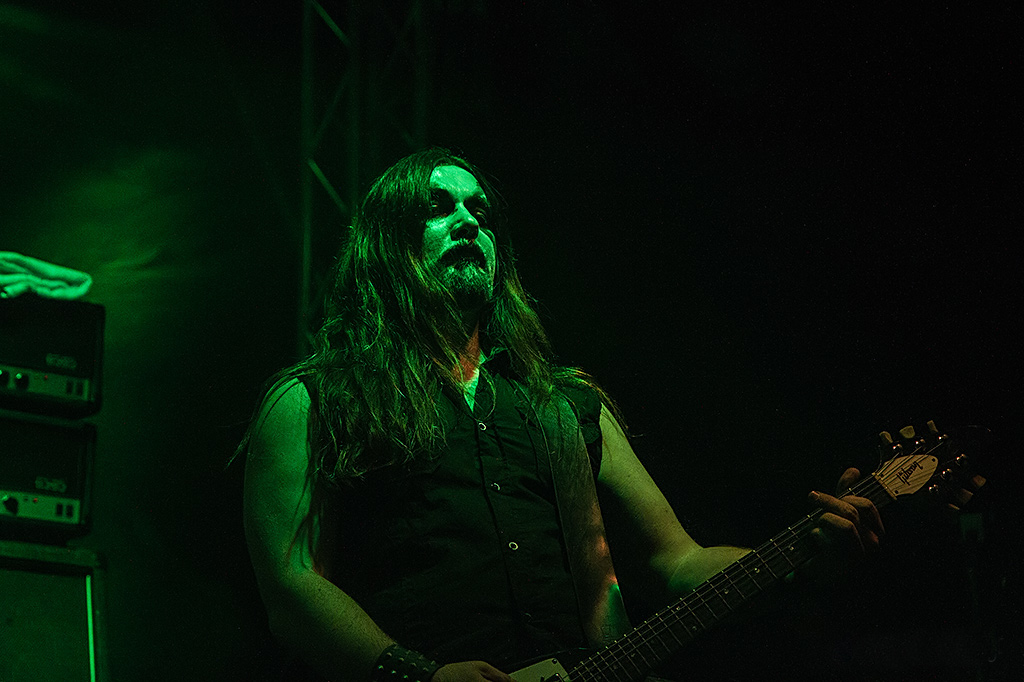
Lust Kilman

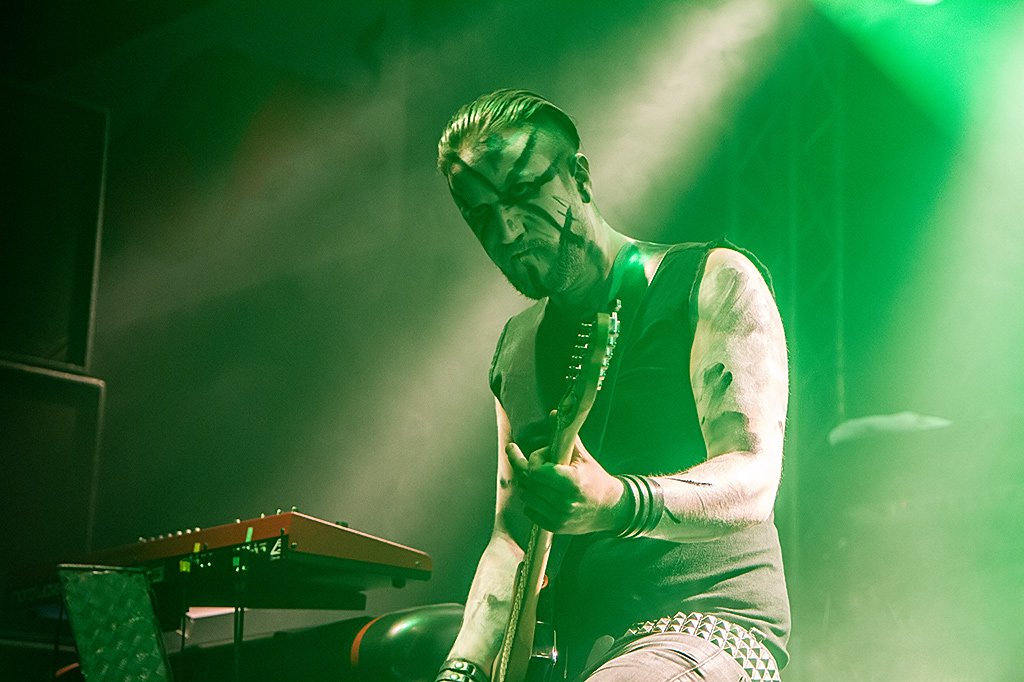
Stian "Sir" Kårstad

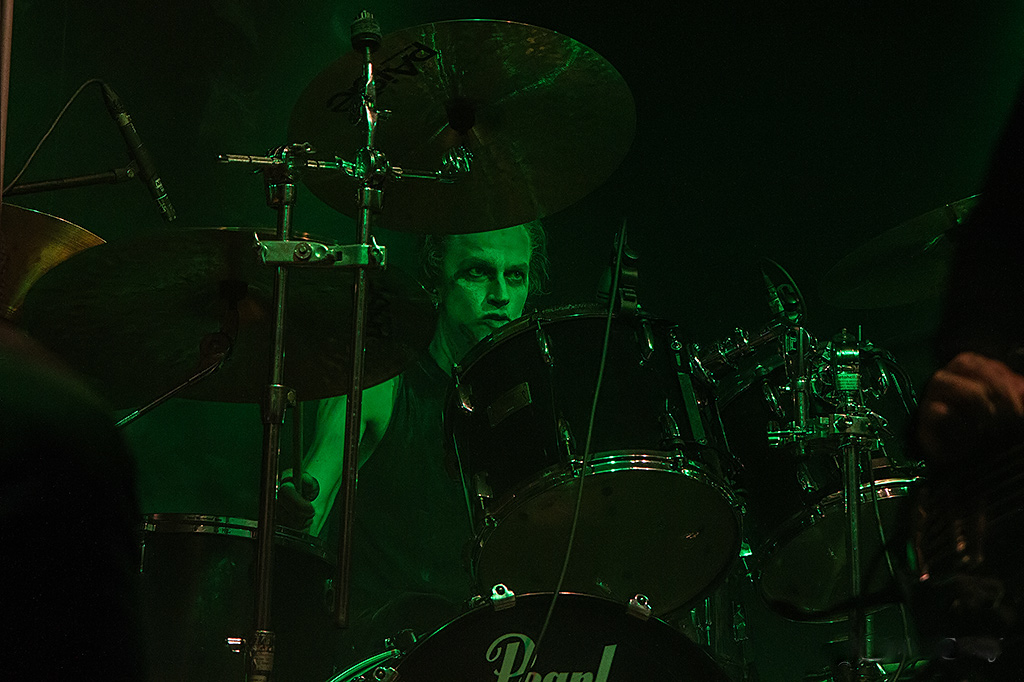
Kenneth Kapstad

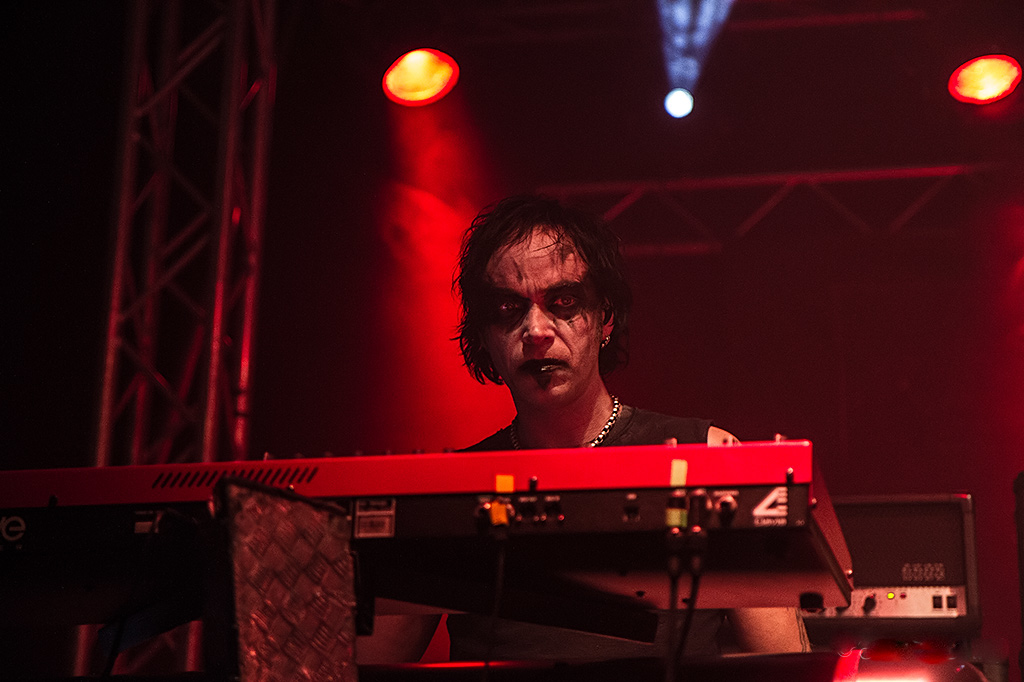
Geir Bratland

God Seed was a result of the Gorgoroth name dispute, when Gorgoroth members Gaahl and King ov Hell attempted to remove founding member Infernus from the band in October 2007. Gaahl and King joined Gorgoroth in 1998 and 1999, respectively, performing on the albums Incipit Satan (2000), Twilight of the Idols (2003), and Ad Majorem Sathanas Gloriam (2006). The two wrote most of Twilight of the Idols and the entire Ad Majorem Sathanas Gloriam. Gaahl sang on the title track of Destroyer (1998).

Following the Gorgoroth dispute in March 2009, when the court recognised Infernus as the legitimate owner of the band name, Gaahl and King assumed the name God Seed. This was the name of a song on Ad Majorem Sathanas Gloriam.

While using the name Gorgoroth during the dispute, Gaahl and King began preparing a new album. When the new band name was announced in March 2009, it was revealed that the album would be released as the first God Seed album. This debut album was fexpected to be released in late 2009, later postponed to early 2010. The album was supposed to be released through Indie Recordings, who ostensibly signed Gaahl and King while they were using the name Gorgoroth during the dispute.

By October 2008, they had recorded everything but the vocals for the new album. At certain points, Gaahl and/or other parties stated that he had begun working on lyrics and vocal arrangements, but apparently that was not the case. In October 2008, studio time was allocated so Gaahl could begin work, prompting the cancellation of a tour. In December 2008, Gaahl implied in an interview that he had not yet worked on lyrics and vocal arrangements, and intended to do so after an European tour with Cradle of Filth, while they were still using the Gorgoroth name. In early 2009, Gaahl and his partner Robin vacationed in Spain for two months. Nettavisen reported that he had been spending the winter helping Dan De Vero record his debut album, although the veracity of this story was questioned, especially since a day after publication the article was revised with almost all references to Gaahl removed. While Gaahl was abroad, King claimed that he was working on lyrics and vocal arrangements, but after Gaahl returned from Spain, King stated,

We have recorded everything in the studio and are just waiting for Gaahl to put on vocals on it. So we have only vocals and the final mix to go before it's all done. It's sometimes a nightmare to work with him in the studio because of the pride he puts into the smallest details. If he is not in the right mood or doesn't find the correct words we get nothing done. At times I've spent days in the studio counting seconds with nothing happening. It's the same way now, but I know in the end the result will be unique and powerful. We have to wait till Gaahl is done writing his lyrics to choose the title for the album. When the whole concept of this album is done lyrically we'll decide which title to use.

God Seed performed at Hellfest Summer Open Air and With Full Force in summer 2009.

At With Full Force in July 2009, Gaahl told Rock Hard that he had quit God Seed, citing a lack of enthusiasm. King later clarified that Gaahl had retired from metal music, with King eventually forming Ov Hell with Shagrath of Dimmu Borgir and incorporating the music intended for the God Seed debut album into this band, with lyrics written by Shagrath.

Gaahl rejoined God Seed in 2012. In January 2012, Live at Wacken was released, which contains live material played as Gorgoroth in 2008 at Wacken Open Air, during the name dispute, written by Gaahl and King since 1999 for Gorgoroth.

On 23 October 2012, God Seed released I Begin. Three years later, on 15 August 2015, God Seed played their final show at Motocultor Festival in France.

== Band members ==
Final lineup

- Gaahl – vocals (2008–2009, 2012–2015)
- King ov Hell – bass (2008–2009, 2012–2015)
- Stian "Sir" Kårstad – guitar (2012–2015)
- Lust Kilman – guitar (2012–2015)
- Kenneth Kapstad – drums (2012–2015)
- Geir Bratland – keyboards, noise (2012–2015)

Live members

- Teloch – guitar (2008–2009)
- Sir – guitar (2009)
- Garghuf – drums (2009)
- Ice Dale – guitar (2008)
- Nick Barker – drums (2008)

== Discography ==
- Live at Wacken (2012) – live album recorded in 2008
- I Begin (2012)
