= List of Dark Funeral members =

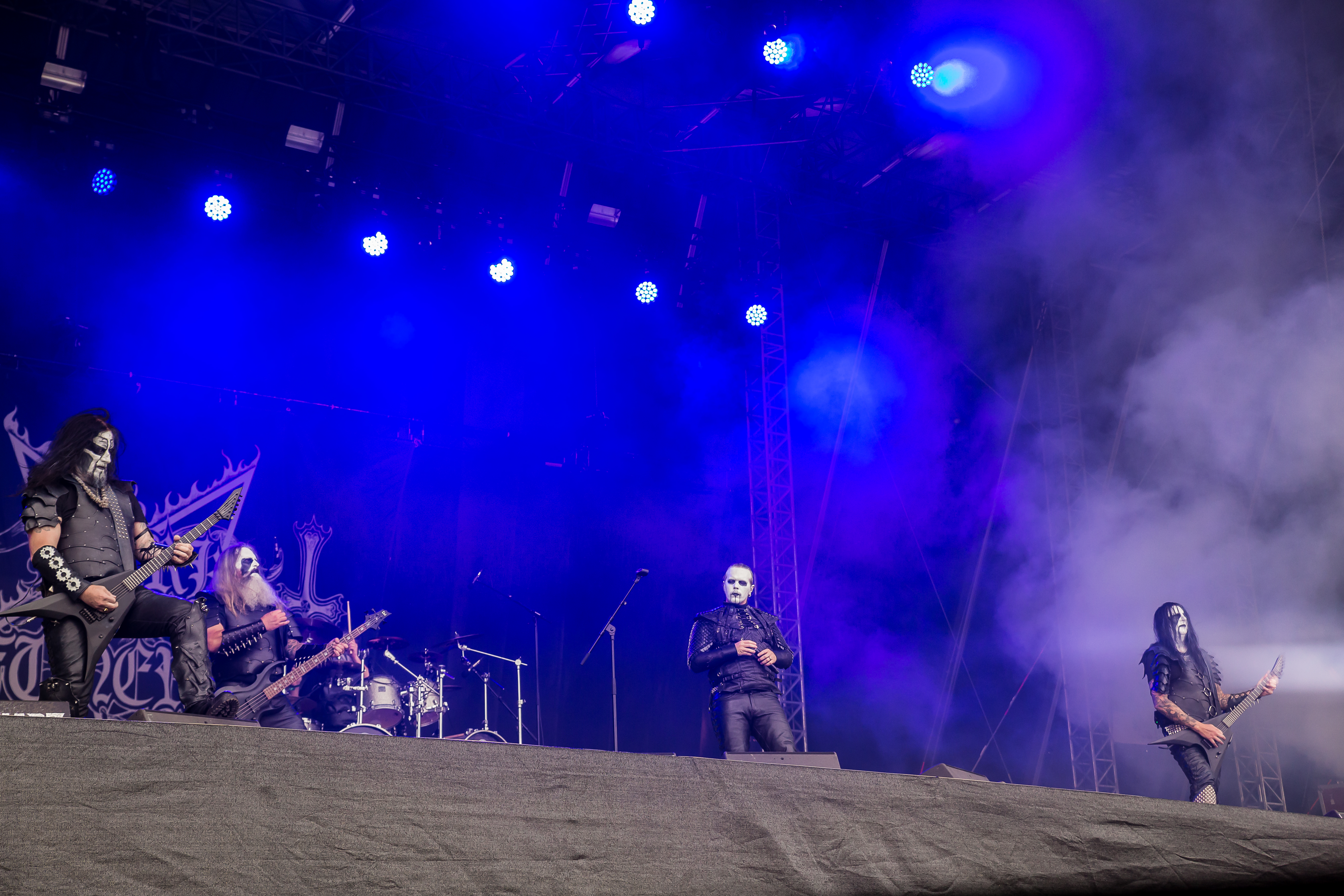
Dark Funeral performing in 2022.

Dark Funeral is a Swedish black metal band from Stockholm. Formed in summer 1993, the group originally consisted of vocalist and bassist Themgoroth (real name Paul Mäkitalo), guitarists Lord Ahriman (Mikael Svanberg) and Blackmoon (David Parland), and drummer Draugen (Joel Andersson). The band's current lineup includes constant member Lord Ahriman alongside guitarist Chaq Mol (Bo Anders Nymark; since 2003), vocalist Heljarmadr (Andreas Vingbäck; since 2014), bassist Adra-Melek (Fredrik Isaksson; since early 2017) and drummer Jalomaah (Janne Jesper Jaloma; since late 2017).

== History ==
=== 1993–2003 ===
Dark Funeral was formed in 1993 by guitarists Lord Ahriman and Blackmoon, with vocalist/bassist Themgoroth and drummer Draugen. This lineup recorded the band's self-titled debut EP at the beginning of 1994, after which Draugen left and was replaced by Equimanthorn (Peter Eklund). During the summer of 1995, the band recorded its debut full-length album The Secrets of the Black Arts, after which Themgoroth and Equimanthorn were replaced by Emperor Magus Caligula (Magnus "Masse" Broberg) and Alzazmon (Tomas Asklund), respectively. Around a year later in July 1996, Blackmoon also left the band, replaced by Typhos (Henrik Ekeroth). Caligula, Ahriman, Typhos and Alzazmon recorded Vobiscum Satanas in 1997, which was released over a year later in April 1998.

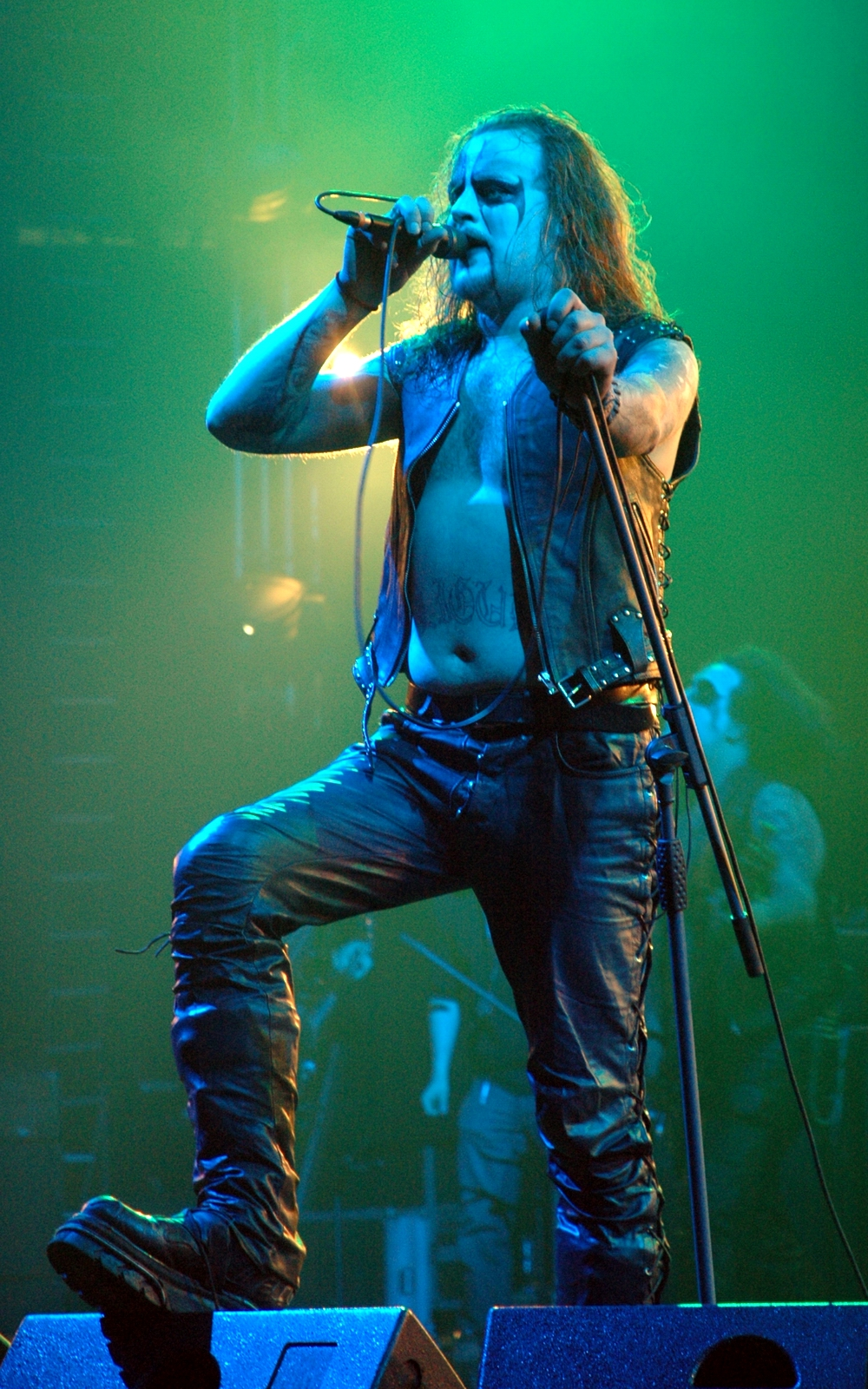
Emperor Magus Caligula fronted Dark Funeral between 1995 and 2010.

During a tour in early 1998, Dominion (Matti Mäkelä) joined as a touring bassist; in the summer, Typhos left and Dominion switched to guitar, with Emperor Magus Caligula taking over bass duties again. Before a tour in the fall, Alzazmon was replaced by Gaahnfaust (Robert Lundin). After recording the EP Teach Children to Worship Satan, Gaahnfaust was replaced by Matte Modin in the summer of 2000, who debuted on the recording of Diabolis Interium early the next year. The subsequent touring cycle featured a string of touring bassists – first Mikael Hedlund, then Kenth "Lord K" Philipson, and finally Richard "Daemon" Cabeza. By the end of the year, Dominion had left the group due to a "lack of motivation", with Chaq Mol (Bo Anders Nymark) taking over early the next year.

=== 2004–2014 ===
In 2004, the lineup of Caligula, Ahriman, Chaq Mol, Daemon and Modin released the band's first live album, De Profundis Clamavi Ad Te Domine. The following summer, the group recorded its fourth album Attera Totus Sanctus with guest bassist Gustaf Hielm. Meanwhile, the band was touring with new bassist B-Force (Bennie Fors), who joined in time for a festival appearance at the beginning of 2005. This lineup remained stable until April 2007, when Emperor Magus Caligula announced that the group would no longer be working with Matte Modin, after blaming him for a number of show cancellations. In June, he was replaced by Dominator (Nils Fjellström). The new lineup, including bassist B-Force, recorded the fifth Dark Funeral album, Angelus Exuro pro Eternus, in 2009.

Dark Funeral underwent numerous lineup changes during the summer of 2010 – first, Emperor Magus Caligula announced that he would be leaving after a final show in August; shortly after the show in question, B-Force also announced his departure from the group; and in September, Lord Ahriman claimed that Dominator had left the band. By June 2011, the drummer had returned from his "short break" for personal reasons. A few weeks later, the group also announced the addition of Nachtgarm (Steve Marbs) on vocals and Zornheym (Tomas Nilsson) on bass. Nachtgarm only remained until early 2013, however, when he left for personal reasons. Emperor Magus Caligula returned for the band's 20th anniversary tour.

=== Since 2014 ===
In December 2014, Dark Funeral announced the addition of vocalist Heljarmadr (Andreas Vingbäck) and bassist Natt (Andreas Fröberg). The new members debuted on the single "Nail Them to the Cross", which was released in February 2015. Natt left prior to the recording of Where Shadows Forever Reign in the spring of 2016, with guitarist Lord Ahriman performing bass on the album. For the subsequent touring cycle, Gustaf Hielm (who had previously performed on Attera Totus Sanctus) joined on bass. After the 2016 shows, Adra-Melek (Fredrik Isaksson) took over as touring bassist. In November 2017, the band announced that Dominator had left for a second time, with Jalomaah (Janne Jesper Jaloma) taking his place. Both members were later made full-time members, featuring on the group's next studio album We Are the Apocalypse in 2022.

== Members ==
=== Current ===
Image	Name (real name)	Years active	Instruments	Release contributions
	Lord Ahriman (Mikael Svanberg)	1993–present	guitar; bass (2016)	all Dark Funeral releases
	Chaq Mol (Bo Anders Nymark)	2003–present	guitar	all Dark Funeral releases from De Profundis Clamavi Ad Te Domine (2004) onwards
	Heljarmadr (Andreas Vingbäck)	2014–present	vocals	"Nail Them to the Cross" (2015); Where Shadows Forever Reign (2016); We Are the Apocalypse (2022)
	Adra-Melek (Fredrik Isaksson)	2017–present (initially touring)	bass	We Are the Apocalypse (2022)
	Jalomaah (Janne Jesper Jaloma)	2017–present (initially touring)	drums	We Are the Apocalypse (2022)

=== Former ===
Image	Name (real name)	Years active	Instruments	Release contributions
	Blackmoon (David Parland)	1993–1996 (died 2013)	guitar; occasional vocals	Dark Funeral (1994); The Secrets of the Black Arts (1996)
	Themgoroth (Paul Mäkitalo)	1993–1995 (plus guest 2014)	vocals; bass	Dark Funeral (1994); The Secrets of the Black Arts (1996)
	Draugen (Joel Andersson)	1993–1994	drums	Dark Funeral (1994)
	Equimanthorn (Peter Eklund)	1994–1995	drums	The Secrets of the Black Arts (1996)
	Emperor Magus Caligula (Magnus "Masse" Broberg)	1995–2010; 2013–2014	vocals; bass (until 2001)	all Dark Funeral releases from Vobiscum Satanas (1998) to Angelus Exuro pro Eternus (2009)
	Alzazmon (Tomas Asklund)	1995–1998	drums	Vobiscum Satanas (1998); In Conspiracy with Satan: A Tribute to Bathory (1998)
	Typhos (Henrik Ekeroth)	1996–1998 (plus guest 2014)	guitar	Vobiscum Satanas (1998); In Conspiracy with Satan: A Tribute to Bathory (1998)
	Dominion (Matti Mäkelä)	1998–2002 (initially touring; plus guest 2014)	guitar; bass (1998)	Teach Children to Worship Satan (2000); Diabolis Interium (2001)
	Gaahnfaust (Robert Lundin)	1998–2000 (plus guest 2014)	drums	Teach Children to Worship Satan (2000)
	Matte Modin	2000–2007	drums	all Dark Funeral releases from Diabolis Interium (2001) to Attera Orbis Terrarum Part II (2008)
	B-Force (Bennie Fors)	2005–2010 (initially touring; plus guest 2014)	bass	Attera Orbis Terrarum Part I (2007) and Part II (2008); Angelus Exuro pro Eternus (2009)
	Dominator (Nils Fjellström)	2007–2010; 2011–2017	drums	Angelus Exuro pro Eternus (2009); Where Shadows Forever Reign (2016)
	Nachtgarm (Steve Marbs)	2011–2013	vocals	none
	Zornheym (Tomas Nilsson)	2011–2014	bass	none
	Natt (Andreas Fröberg)	2014–2016	bass	"Nail Them to the Cross" (2015)

=== Touring ===
Image	Name (real name)	Years active	Instruments	Details
	Mikael Hedlund	2001	bass	Hedlund was brought in as touring bassist for shows starting in the summer of 2001.
	Kenth "Lord K" Philipson	2001–2002	bass	Philipson took over from Hedlund as touring bassist from late 2001 into early 2002.
	Richard "Daemon" Cabeza	2002–2005	bass	Cabeza took over from Philipson in the spring of 2002, remaining for several years.
	Gustaf Hielm	2016 (plus session 2005)	bass	After performing on Attera Totus Sanctus (2005), Hielm took over from Natt on tour in 2016.

== Lineups ==
Period	Members	Releases
Summer 1993 – early 1994	Themgoroth – vocals, bass; Lord Ahriman – guitar; Blackmoon – guitar; Draugen – drums	Dark Funeral (1994)
Early 1994 – summer 1995	Themgoroth – vocals, bass; Lord Ahriman – guitar; Blackmoon – guitar; Equimanthorn – drums	The Secrets of the Black Arts (1996)
Summer 1995 – July 1996	Emperor Magus Caligula – vocals, bass; Lord Ahriman – guitar; Blackmoon – guitar; Alzazmon – drums	none
July 1996 – early 1998	Emperor Magus Caligula – vocals, bass; Lord Ahriman – guitar; Typhos – guitar; Alzazmon – drums	Vobiscum Satanas (1998); In Conspiracy with Satan: A Tribute to Bathory (1998) – two tracks
Early – summer 1998	Emperor Magus Caligula – vocals; Lord Ahriman – guitar; Typhos – guitar; Dominion – bass (touring); Alzazmon – drums	none
Summer – fall 1998	Emperor Magus Caligula – vocals, bass; Lord Ahriman – guitar; Dominion – guitar; Alzazmon – drums	none
Fall 1998 – summer 2000	Emperor Magus Caligula – vocals, bass; Lord Ahriman – guitar; Dominion – guitar; Gaahnfaust – drums	Teach Children to Worship Satan (2000)
Summer 2000 – summer 2001	Emperor Magus Caligula – vocals, bass; Lord Ahriman – guitar; Dominion – guitar; Matte Modin – drums	Diabolis Interium (2001)
Summer – late 2001	Emperor Magus Caligula – vocals; Lord Ahriman – guitar; Dominion – guitar; Mikeael Hedlund – bass (touring); Matte Modin – drums	none
Late 2001 – early 2002	Emperor Magus Caligula – vocals; Lord Ahriman – guitar; Dominion – guitar; Lord K – bass (touring); Matte Modin – drums	none
Spring – late 2002	Emperor Magus Caligula – vocals; Lord Ahriman – guitar; Dominion – guitar; Richard Daemon – bass (touring); Matte Modin – drums	none
Early 2003 – early 2005	Emperor Magus Caligula – vocals; Lord Ahriman – guitar; Chaq Mol – guitar; Richard Daemon – bass (touring); Matte Modin – drums	De Profundis Clamavi Ad Te Domine (2004)
Early 2005 – April 2007	Emperor Magus Caligula – vocals; Lord Ahriman – guitar; Chaq Mol – guitar; B-Force – bass (touring); Matte Modin – drums	Attera Totus Sanctus (2005); Attera Orbis Terrarum Part I (2007); Attera Orbis Terrarum Part II (2008)
June 2007 – August 2010	Emperor Magus Caligula – vocals; Lord Ahriman – guitar; Chaq Mol – guitar; B-Force – bass; Dominator – drums	Angelus Exuro pro Eternus (2009)
Summer 2011 – early 2013	Nachtgarm – vocals; Lord Ahriman – guitar; Chaq Mol – guitar; Zornheym – bass; Dominator – drums	none
Early 2013 – December 2014	Emperor Magus Caligula – vocals; Lord Ahriman – guitar; Chaq Mol – guitar; Zornheym – bass; Dominator – drums	none
December 2014 – early 2016	Heljarmadr – vocals; Lord Ahriman – guitar; Chaq Mol – guitar; Natt – bass; Dominator – drums	"Nail Them to the Cross" (2015)
Spring – summer 2016	Heljarmadr – vocals; Lord Ahriman – guitar, bass; Chaq Mol – guitar; Dominator – drums	Where Shadows Forever Reign (2016)
Summer – late 2016	Heljarmadr – vocals; Lord Ahriman – guitar; Chaq Mol – guitar; Gustaf Hielm – bass (touring); Dominator – drums	none
Early – November 2017	Heljarmadr – vocals; Lord Ahriman – guitar; Chaq Mol – guitar; Adra-Melek – bass (touring); Dominator – drums	none
November 2017 – present	Heljarmadr – vocals; Lord Ahriman – guitar; Chaq Mol – guitar; Adra-Melek – bass; Jalomaah – drums	We Are the Apocalypse (2022)
