= Dark Funeral (EP) =

1994 debut EP by Dark Funeral

EP by Dark Funeral
- Released: 4 May 1994
- Recorded: January 1994
- Studio: Unisound Studios, Örebro, Sweden
- Genre: Black metal
- Length: 16:34
- Label: Hellspawn Records
- Producer: Dan Swanö, Dark Funeral

Dark Funeral chronology
Dark Funeral (1994)	The Secrets of the Black Arts (1996)

Professional ratings
Review scores
Source	Rating
Collector's Guide to Heavy Metal	6/10

Dark Funeral (originally an untitled EP) is the debut EP by Swedish black metal band Dark Funeral, released in 1994.

== Track listing ==
Original EP
No.	Title	Length
1.	"Open the Gates"	4:34
2.	"Shadows over Transylvania"	4:23
3.	"My Dark Desires"	3:53
4.	"In the Sign of the Horns"	3:44
Total length:		16:34

In the Sign... (Additional Tracks)
No.	Title	Length
5.	"Equimanthorn" (Bathory cover)	3:21
6.	"Call from the Grave" (Bathory cover)	4:35
Total length:		24:27

In the Sign... (2013 Reissue Bonus Tracks)
No.	Title	Length
7.	"Open the Gates" (Live 2003)	3:54
8.	"Shadows Over Transylvania" (Live 2003)	3:16
9.	"My Dark Desires" (Live 2003)	3:48
Total length:		35:24

== In the Sign... ==
In the Sign... is a compilation EP and a re-release of the Dark Funeral EP. It contains two extra tracks taken from the Bathory tribute album In Conspiracy with Satan – A Tribute to Bathory. The EP tracks were remastered at Cutting Room Studios in November 1999.

In the Sign...

Compilation album by Dark Funeral
- Released: 4 June 2000
- Recorded: January 1994 (1-4); March 1996 (5, 6)
- Studio: Hellspawn/Unisound Studios (tracks 1-4); The Abyss (tracks 5, 6)
- Genre: Black metal
- Length: 24:27
- Label: Regain
- Producer: Dark Funeral

Dark Funeral chronology
Vobiscum Satanas (1998)	In the Sign... (2000)	Diabolis Interium (2001)

Professional ratings
Review scores
Source	Rating
AllMusic	2.5/5 stars

== Personnel ==
=== Dark Funeral ===
- Themgoroth – vocals and bass (1–4)
- Lord Ahriman – guitars (1–6)
- Blackmoon – guitars (1–4)
- Draugen – drums (1–4)

=== In the Sign... additional personnel ===
- Emperor Magus Caligula – vocals and bass
- Typhos - guitar
- Alzazmon – drums
