= Infernal (Swedish band) =

Swedish black metal band

- Origin: Sweden
- Genres: Black metal
- Years active: 1997–2003, 2008–2013
- Label: Goathorned
- Past members: David Parland; Paul Mäkitalo; Matte Modin; David Larsson; Henke; Ekeroth; Tomas Asklund; Martin Halfdan; Lord Abbadon; Carl Engstrøm

Infernal was a Swedish black metal band based in Stockholm.

== History ==
The band was formed in 1997, mainly by David Parland (Blackmoon), who quickly teamed up with ex-Dark Funeral colleague and vocalist Themgoroth (Paul Mäkitalo), to create a band both similar to and more brutal and extreme than Dark Funeral, which Blackmoon had left in mid 1996.

The band saw the participation of several members like Matte Modin (ex-Dark Funeral, Defleshed) and Impious of In Aeternum among others. The last known line-up was Blackmoon (David Parland) - guitars, Typhos (Henke Ekeroth) - vocals and guitars and Alzazmon (Tomas Asklund) - drums - this was the second real line-up, and it was dissolved in 2003.

David Parland reformed the band in late 2008 with drummer Asklund. Infernal's new musical direction showcased a slightly more accessible sound than the first two Infernal EPs, and the new musical direction is more along older death/black metal and not as blastbeat-oriented as the old Infernal. This line-up introduced David as a vocalist as well as guitarist. The line-up was planned to be expanded to a full band in time for the planned full-length album and possible live gigs.

On July 14, 2009, it was revealed that Infernal had permanently parted ways with drummer Tomas Asklund. A replacement in the form of Norwegian drummer Carl Engstrøm from Astaroth and Recovery Injection was found, and announced on October 17. Old Necrophobic colleague and guitarist Martin Halfdan also joined the band as a live and lead/solo guitarist. Lord Abbadon joined in late 2009, also mainly as a live member, and for a short time as a permanent bass player. He departed from the band for personal reasons and later committed suicide while playing in the band From Purgatory.

On May 2, 2010, Colombian underground cult label Goathorned Productions released the 3-track Infernal EP "The Infernal Return". This release features 3 tracks recorded early 2009, with David on guitars, bass and lead vocals. Tomas Asklund (Gorgoroth, Dawn) played session drums on this EP. A demo entitled "Hellhymns" featured four tracks; it was the last recording before a full-length album, scheduled for release in late 2010 or early 2011.

On March 19, 2013, founder David Parland died, putting an end to the band.

== Band members ==
=== Final lineup ===
- David "Blackmoon" Parland – guitars, bass, vocals (1997–2003, 2008–2013) (deceased)

=== Former members ===
- Paul "Themgoroth" Mäkitalo – vocals (1997–1999)
- David "Impious" Larsson – guitar, vocals (1997–1999)
- Matte Modin – drums (1997–1999)
- Henke "Typhos" Ekeroth – guitar, vocals (2002–2003)
- Tomas Asklund – drums (2002–2003, 2008–2009)
- Martin Halfdan – guitars (2008)
- Lord Abbadon – bass (2009-2010)
- Carl "Telal" Engström – drums (2010)

== Discography ==
- Infernal (EP) (1999)
- Under Wings of Hell (split) (2002)
- Summon Forth the Beast (EP) (2002)
- The Infernal Return (7-inch EP) (2010)
