= Daniel Bergstrand =

Swedish record producer

Daniel Bergstrand is a Swedish record producer, most notable for his work with bands such as In Flames, Meshuggah, Soilwork, Dimmu Borgir, and Behemoth.

He is the owner of the Dugout Productions studio, which is based in Uppsala, Sweden.

His work with In Flames was awarded with Grammi Awards on the albums Come Clarity and Soundtrack to Your Escape.

Bergstrand is, along with Tomas Haake of Meshuggah, the producer of the drum sample packs “Drumkit from Hell”, "The Metal Foundry" and "Metalheads!" for Toontrack's Superior Drummer and EZdrummer virtual drum software.

In 2019, Behemoth’s 2014 album The Satanist, which Bergstrand co-produced, was voted as the "Best Metal Album of the Decade" by various publications such as Loudwire, Consequence of Sound, and others.

== Discography ==
Daniel Bergstrand has been listed as producer for the following:

- Grimaze - The Heart of a Collapsing Star (2024)
- Dark Funeral - We Are the Apocalypse (2022)
- Misticia - XVA (2018/19)
- Hamferð - Támsins Likam (2017)
- Pain of Salvation - In the Passing Light of Day (2017)
- Misticia - Mallku (2017)
- Dark Funeral - Where Shadows Forever Reign (2016)
- Dreamshade - Vibrant (2016)
- Port Noir - Any Way the Wind Carries (2016)
- Odd Crew - Mark These Words (2015)
- Behemoth - The Satanist (2014)
- Corrosion - Self Titled EP (2014)
- Port Noir - Puls (2013)
- Meshuggah - Koloss (2012)
- Insense - Burn in Beautiful Fire (2011)
- Evergrey - Glorious Collision (2011)
- In Flames - Sounds of a Playground Fading (2011)
- Dimmu Borgir - Abrahadabra (2010)
- Antipoda - Manifesto (2009)
- Behemoth - Evangelion (2009)
- Insense - The Silent Epidemic (2007)
- The Duskfall - The Dying Wonders of the World (2007)
- Human Defects - Out of Control (2006)
- In Flames - Come Clarity (2006)
- Dark Funeral - Attera Totus Sanctus (2005)
- Soilwork - "Stabbing the drama" 2005
- F.K.U. - Sometimes They Come Back... to Mosh (2004)
- In Flames - Soundtrack to Your Escape (2004)
- Aqme - Polaroids and Pornographie (2004)
- Behemoth - Demigod (2004)
- The Duskfall - Source (2003)
- El Caco - Solid Rest (2003)
- The Quill - Hooray Its a Deathtrip (2003)
- In Flames - Reroute to Remain (2002)
- The Duskfall - Frailty (2002)
- Defleshed - Royal Straight Flesh (2002)
- Darkane - Expanding Senses (2002)
- Aqme - Sombres Efforts (2002)
- Darkane - Insanity (2001)
- Scarve - Translucence (2000)
- F.K.U. - Metal Moshing Mad (1999)
- Darkane - Rusted Angel (1999)
- Meshuggah - Chaosphere (1998)
- Strapping Young Lad - City (1997)
- Devin Townsend - Ocean Machine: Biomech (1997)
- Meshuggah - Destroy Erase Improve (1995)
