= Negator =

Negator can mean any of the following:

- Negation (as a function of linguistics)
- The sign for negation in logic (usually ¬ or ~)
- an order-reversing self-mapping of the interval [0, 1] used for definition of De Morgan Triplets and in fuzzy set theory as in fuzzy logic.
- Negator (band)
