= Vobiscum =

Vobiscum may refer to:

- Dominus Vobiscum is a liturgical blessing given by Roman Catholic priests during the celebration of the mass.
- Pax vobiscum is a salutation in the Roman liturgy.
- Vobiscum Satanas Dark Funeral's second full-length album.
