= Lord Belial =

Swedish black metal band

- Origin: Trollhättan, Sweden
- Genres: Black metal Melodic black metal Blackened death metal
- Years active: 1992–2009, 2010–2011, 2013–2015, 2020–present
- Labels: No Fashion, Metal Blade, Regain, Dozer, Hammerheart Records
- Members: Thomas Backelin; Micke Backelin; Niclas Pepa Green
- Website: lordbelial.net

Lord Belial is a Swedish black metal band formed in Trollhättan in 1992.

== History ==
The band formed in 1992 and released their debut album in 1995, making them pioneers of Swedish black metal. Their sound has been compared to Dissection. In January 2009, they stopped activities due to drummer Micke Backelin's hearing problem.

Despite announcing, in July 2010, that the band was working on new material, one year later, they announced that "Lord Belial are not active. No album or gigs are planned for the moment. No interviews will be answered." In 2013, the only members remaining were Thomas Backelin and Micke Backelin. Live session musicians included Fredrik Wester on guitars, and bassist Adam Chapman.

Lord Belial returned to touring in 2014, with performances at the Mörkaste Småland Festival. Lord Belial continued touring, and announced their tour schedule for 2020 and 2021. The band signed with Hammerheart Records in May 2021, and released Rapture, their first studio album in 14 years, in May 2022.

== Members ==
=== Current ===
- Thomas Backelin - guitars, vocals
- Micke Backelin - drums
- Niclas "Pepa" Green - guitars

=== Live 2013 ===
- Fredrik Wester - guitars
- Adam Chapman - bass

=== Former, session ===
- Anders Backelin - bass
- Daniel "Mojjo" Moilanen - drums
- Fredrik "Plague" Wester - guitars (2000, 2002)
- Hjalmar Nielsen - guitars
- Jenny "Lilith" Andersson - flute (1993–1999 and Kiss the Goat)
- Cecilia Sander - flute (Into the Frozen Shadows and Angelgrinder)
- Catharina Jacobsson - flute (Enter the Moonlight Gate)
- Annelie Jacobsson - flute (Unholy Crusade)
- Jelena Almvide - cello (Enter the Moonlight Gate and Unholy Crusade)

== Discography ==
- Kiss the Goat (1995)
- Enter the Moonlight Gate (1997)
- Unholy Crusade (1999)
- Angelgrinder (2002)
- Doomed by Death (Split, 2002)
- Purify Sweden (Single, 2003)
- Scythe of Death (EP, 2003)
- The Seal of Belial (2004)
- Nocturnal Beast (2005)
- Revelation (2007)
- The Black Curse (2008)
- Rapture (2022)
- Unholy Trinity (2025)

=== Videography ===
- Night Divine (VHS, 2001)
- Mark of the Beast (DVD, 2004)
