= Merciless (band) =

Swedish extreme metal band

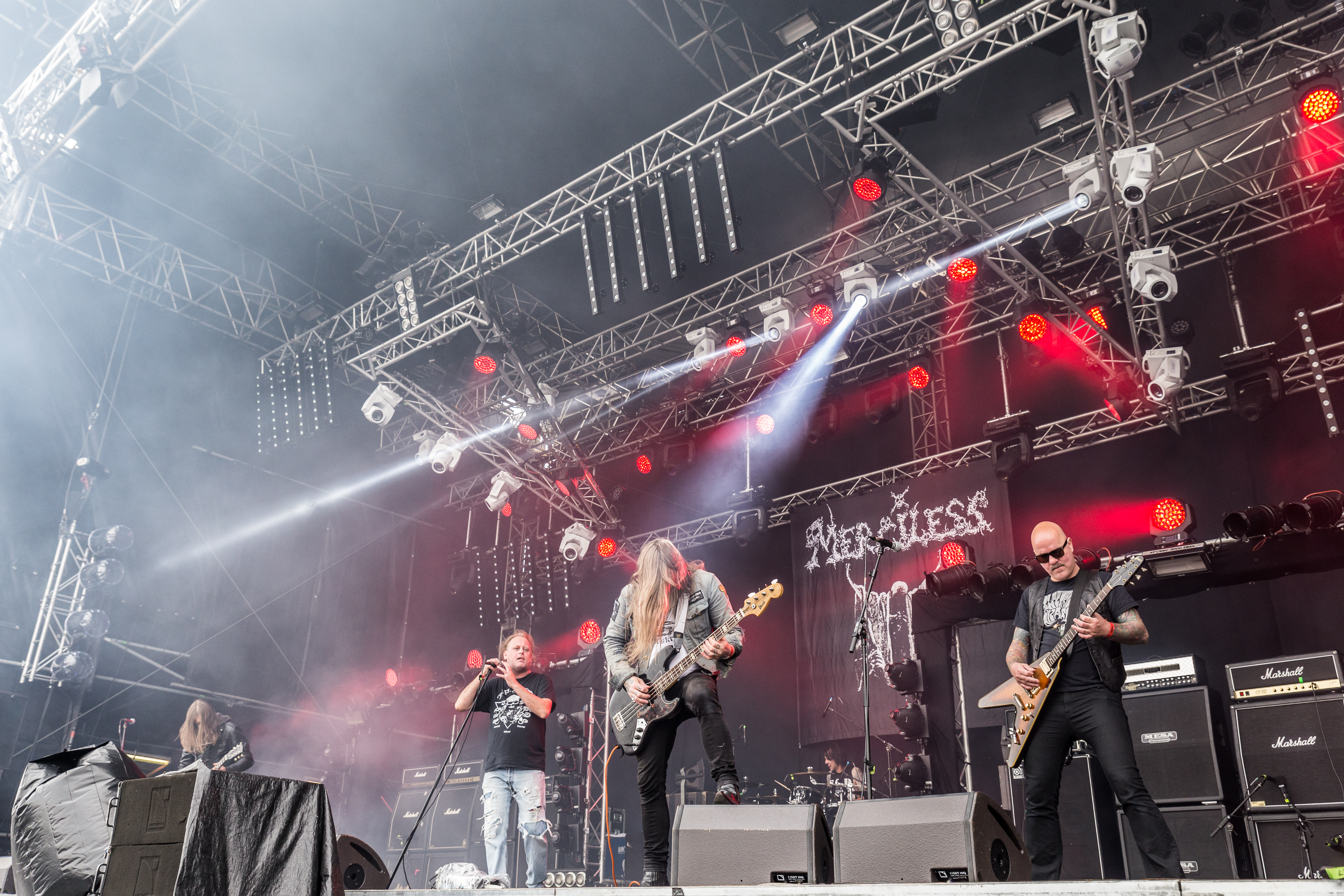
- Merciless at Party.San Metal Open Air 2017

Background information
- Also known as: Obsessed, Black Mass
- Origin: Strängnäs, Sweden
- Genres: Death metal; thrash metal
- Years active: 1986–present
- Labels: Deathlike Silence, Active, No Fashion, Osmose, Black Lodge
- Members: Roger "Rogga" Pettersson; Erik Wallin; Peter Stjärnvind; Stefan "Stipen" Carlsson
- Past members: Kalle "Kåle" Aurenius; Fredrik Karlén

Merciless is a Swedish death/thrash metal band, formed in Strängnäs in 1986. They are one of the longest-serving Swedish extreme metal bands.

== History ==
The band was formed during the summer of 1986 in Strängnäs by Erik Wallin (guitar), Fredrik Karlén (bass guitar) and Stefan Carlsson (drums). They were inspired by the early fast-playing bands such as Kreator, Sodom, Destruction and Bathory. They played some local shows as "Obsessed" and "Black Mass", but changed their name to Merciless in early 1987. A demo was recorded titled Behind the Black Door, which led to the replacement of Kåle by Rogga in early 1988. With this line-up, they recorded a second demo, Realm of the Dark, in June 1988. This demo drew the attention of Deathlike Silence Productions - the label of Euronymous. That label released their debut album, The Awakening, in March 1990.

Their second album, The Treasures Within, was recorded in June and July 1991 but not released until a year later due to the mismanagement of their new label, Active Records. This delay cause the departure of drummer Stipen, who was replaced with Peter Stjärnvind in February 1992. In September 1993, after a Scandinavian tour, they recorded their third album with Dan Swanö at Unisound studios and was released by No Fashion Records. In 1994, the band broke up because of disillusionment with record labels, but got reunited in 1995 to record the song "Crionics" for the Slayer tribute album, Slatanic Slaughter. In 1999, their debut album was re-issued by Osmose Productions, which eventually led to the reinstallment of the band. In May 2002, they recorded the successor to their 1994 album, titled Merciless.

== Members ==
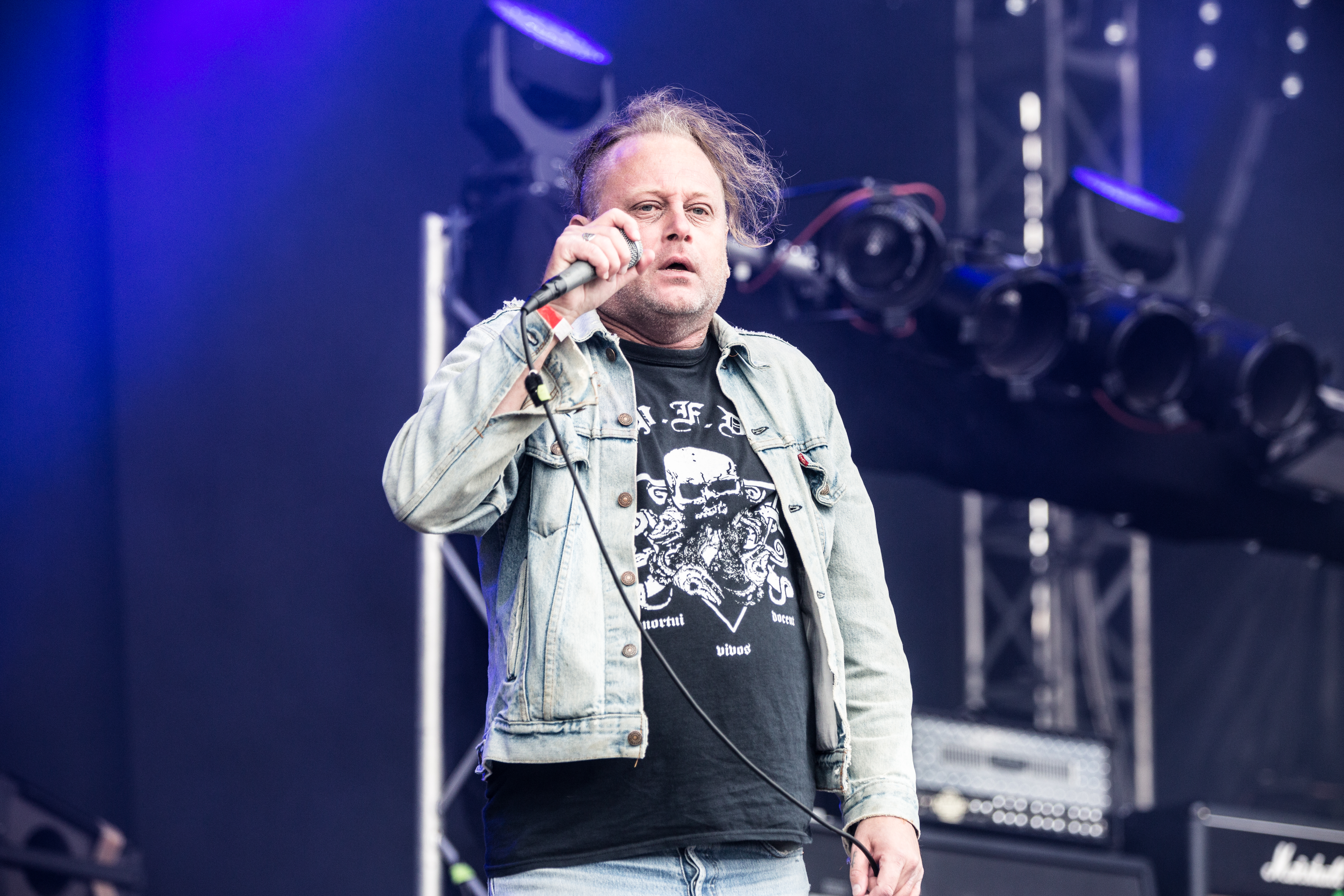
Singer Roger "Rogga" Pettersson at Party.San 2017

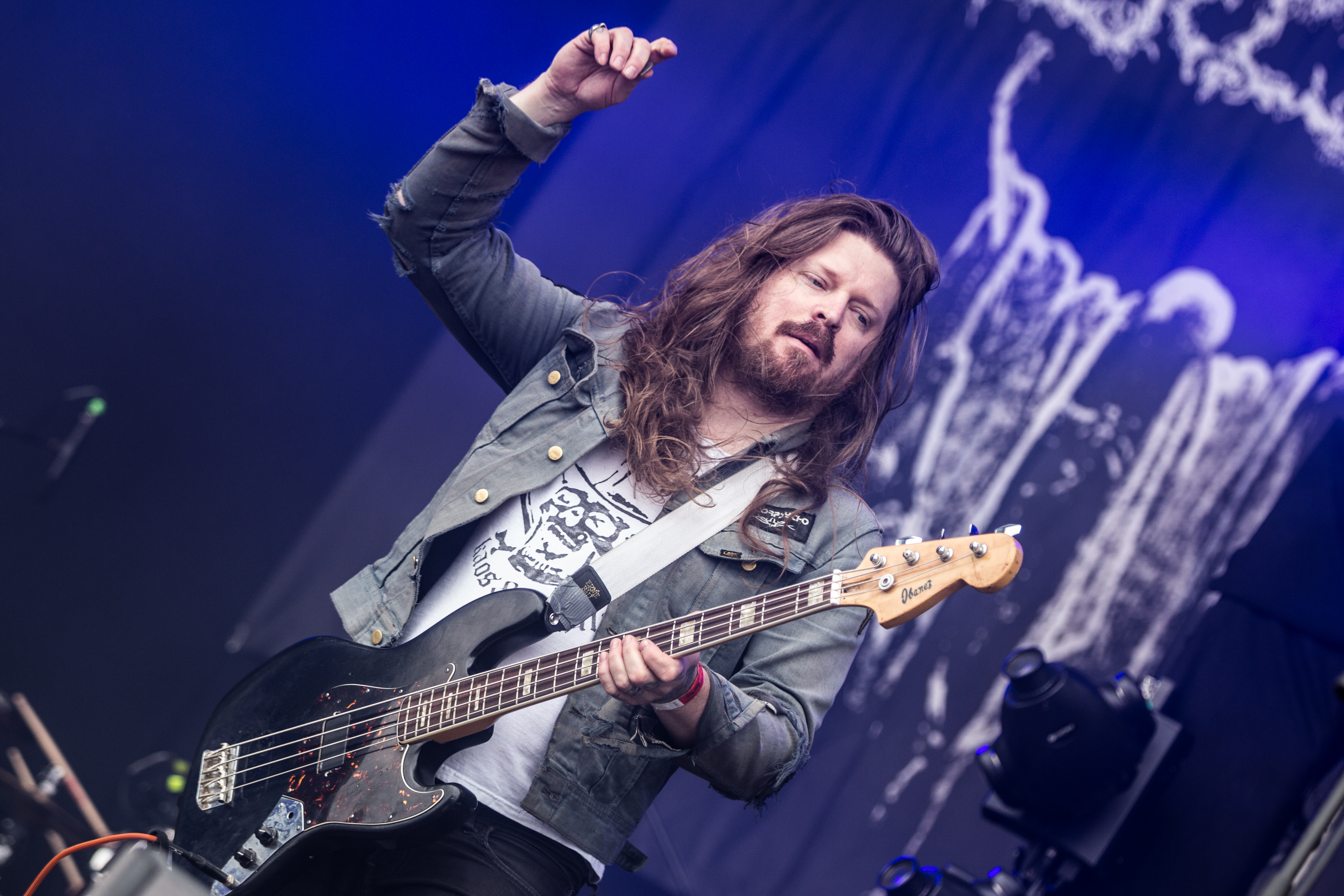
Live bass guitarist Pontus Tahir at Party.San 2017

=== Current members ===
- Roger "Rogga" Pettersson – vocals (1988–present)
- Erik Wallin – guitars (1986–present)
- Peter Stjärnvind – drums (1992–2004), bass (2016–present)
- Stefan "Stipen" Carlsson – drums (1986–1992, 2004–present)

=== Former members ===
- Kalle "Kåle" Aurenius – vocals (1986–1988, died 2017)
- Fredrik Karlén – bass (1986–2016)

== Discography ==
- Behind the Black Door (demo, 1987)
- Realm of the Dark (demo, 1988)
- The Awakening (1990)
- The Treasures Within (1992)
- Unbound (1994)
- Merciless (2003)
