= De Profundis Clamavi Ad Te Domine =

Live album by Dark Funeral
- Released: 18 June 2004
- Recorded: September 2003
- Venue: Brazil, Chile and Colombia
- Genre: Black metal
- Length: 65:00
- Language: English, Latin
- Label: Regain
- Producer: Dark Funeral

Dark Funeral chronology
Diabolis Interium (2001)	De Profundis Clamavi Ad Te Domine (2004)	Attera Totus Sanctus (2005)

Professional ratings
Review scores
Source	Rating
AllMusic	4/5 stars

De Profundis Clamavi Ad Te Domine (Latin for "From the Depths, I Have Cried Out to You, O Lord") is the first live album by Swedish black metal band Dark Funeral. It was recorded during the South American tour in September 2003, and was released by Regain Records on 18 April 2004.

== Track listing ==
All lyrics are written by Emperor Magus Caligula; all music is composed by Lord Ahriman

No.	Title	Length
1.	"Bleed for Satan - Intro"	1:52
2.	"The Arrival of Satan's Empire"	3:47
3.	"An Apprentice of Satan"	5:30
4.	"The Dawn No More Rises"	4:06
5.	"Thy Legions Come"	4:10
6.	"Hail Murder"	5:20
7.	"Goddess of Sodomy"	3:20
8.	"The Secrets of the Black Arts"	3:34
9.	"Vobiscum Satanas"	4:20
10.	"Shadows over Transylvania"	3:32
11.	"Open the Gates"	4:18
12.	"Ineffable Kings of Darkness"	4:35
13.	"Thus I Have Spoken"	5:20
14.	"My Dark Desires"	3:58
15.	"Armageddon Finally Comes"	4:06

== Personnel ==
- Lord Ahriman – guitars
- Emperor Magus Caligula – vocals
- Chaq Mol – guitars
- Matte Modin – drums
- Richard Daemon – bass guitar
