= The Secrets of the Black Arts =

Studio album by Dark Funeral
- Released: January 1996
- Recorded: 1995
- Studio: The Abyss, Pärlby, Sweden
- Genre: Black metal
- Length: 40:53
- Label: No Fashion
- Producer: Dark Funeral, Peter Tägtgren

Dark Funeral chronology
Dark Funeral (1994)	The Secrets of the Black Arts (1996)	Vobiscum Satanas (1998)

Professional ratings
Review scores
Source	Rating
About.com	4/5 stars
AllMusic	2.5/5 stars
Chronicles of Chaos	5/10
Collector's Guide to Heavy Metal	7/10

The Secrets of the Black Arts is the debut studio album by Swedish black metal band Dark Funeral, released in January 1996, by No Fashion Records. It was re-released on 31 July 2007, with a bonus disc consisting of the album original recording (digitally re-mixed in April 2007). The Secrets of the Black Arts is the only album to feature guitarist Blackmoon, vocalist/bassist Themgoroth and drummer Equimanthorn.

The original recording (15–21 January 1995) was produced by Dan Swanö at Unisound Studios. According to Blackmoon, he insisted that they re-record the album due to "severely unprofessional production and manner from Mr. Swanö". He continued, "He was overworked and mentally tired when we came to the studio. Also, our then-drummer was not playing as good as he should have. So it ended up crap." The rest of the band was satisfied with the recording, but Blackmoon refused to release the album with that recording. They decided to record the album again at The Abyss Studio with Peter Tägtgren as producer and this version was eventually released to the public.

A music video was shot for "The Secrets of the Black Arts".

== Track listing ==
No.	Title	Lyrics	Music	Length
1.	"The Dark Age Has Arrived" (Intro)		Dark Funeral	0:16
2.	"The Secrets of the Black Arts"	Blackmoon, Themgoroth	Dark Funeral	3:42
3.	"My Dark Desires"	Themgoroth	Blackmoon	3:47
4.	"The Dawn No More Rises"	Blackmoon	Blackmoon, Ahriman, Themgoroth	4:00
5.	"When Angels Forever Die"	Blackmoon	Blackmoon, Ahriman, Themgoroth	4:07
6.	"The Fire Eternal"	Blackmoon	Blackmoon, Ahriman	3:55
7.	"Satan's Mayhem"	Themgoroth	Dark Funeral	4:54
8.	"Shadows over Transylvania"	Blackmoon, Ahriman	Blackmoon, Ahriman	3:41
9.	"Bloodfrozen"	Blackmoon	Blackmoon, Ahriman	4:21
10.	"Satanic Blood" (Von cover)	Von	Von	2:11
11.	"Dark Are the Paths to Eternity (A Summoning Nocturnal)"	Themgoroth	Blackmoon, Ahriman	5:59
Total length:				40:53

2007 reissue bonus disc
No.	Title	Length
1.	"Shadows over Transylvania" (Unisound version)	3:39
2.	"The Dawn No More Rises" (Unisound version)	3:40
3.	"The Secrets of the Black Arts" (Unisound version)	3:27
4.	"Satan's Mayhem" (Unisound version)	4:49
5.	"Bloodfrozen" (Unisound version)	3:36
6.	"My Dark Desires" (Unisound version)	3:23
7.	"Dark Are the Path to Eternity (A Summoning Nocturnal)" (Unisound version)	5:38
8.	"The Fire Eternal" (Unisound version)	3:38
Total length:		31:50

== Personnel ==
Dark Funeral

- Themgoroth – vocals, bass guitar
- Blackmoon – guitar, vocals on "Satanic Blood"
- Lord Ahriman – guitar
- Equimanthorn – drums

Production

- Peter Tägtgren – producer, engineer
- Dan Swanö – engineer (2007 edition bonus tracks)
