= Ablaze My Sorrow =

Swedish melodic death metal band

- Origin: Falkenberg, Sweden
- Genres: Melodic death metal
- Years active: 1993–2006, 2013–present
- Label: No Fashion Records

Ablaze My Sorrow is a melodic death metal band from Falkenberg, Sweden. The group formed in 1993 and released three full-length albums for No Fashion Records. They went through several lineup changes and received exposure from the metal press before disbanding in August 2006. The band reunited in January 2013.

== History ==
The group came together in 1993, featuring original members Martin Quist on vocals and guitar, Magnus Carlsson on guitar, Anders Brorsson on bass, and Fredrik Wenzel on drums. The group recorded a demo before drummer Alex Bengtsson replaced Wenzel and guitarist Roger Johansson joined the group. They both played on the 1996 debut for No Fashion Records, If Emotion Still Burns. After the record's release, Quist and Johansson left and were replaced with Fredrik Arnesson on vocals and Dennie Linden on guitar in time for their 1997 follow-up, The Plague. After The Plague, the group went on hiatus, and replaced Fredrik Arnesson with vocalist Kristian Lönnsjö and electronic bagpipist Chris Kojali. In 2001, they returned with their third album, Anger, Hate and Fury. The cover featured artwork by album cover artist Niklas Sundin. In 2004, the group played the Swedish 2000 Decibel festival. On August 16, 2006, the group announced it was breaking up. The band reunited in January 2013.

== Members ==
=== Current line-up ===
- Anders Brorsson - bass (1993–2006, 2013–present)
- Magnus Carlsson - guitars (1993–1997, 1998–2006, 2013-present)
- Alex Bengtsson - drums (1994–2006, 2013–present)
- Dennie Lindén - guitars (1996–2006, 2013–present)
- Jonas Udd - vocals (2019–present)

=== Former members ===
- Kristian Lönnsjö - vocals (1999–2006, 2009, 2013–2019)
- Anders Lundin - guitar (1998–1999)
- Fredrik Arnesson - vocals (1997–2000)
- Roger Johansson - guitar (1995–1996)
- Fredrik Wenzel - drums (1993–1995)
- Martin Qvist - vocals, guitar (1993–1997)

== Discography ==
Studio albums

- If Emotions Still Burn (1996, No Fashion Records)
- The Plague (1998, No Fashion Records)
- Anger, Hate and Fury (2002, No Fashion Records)
- Black (2016, Apostasy Records)
- Among Ashes and Monoliths (2021, Black Lion Records)

EPs

- The Suicide Note (2009, Pronode Records)
- The Loss of All Hope (2023, Black Lion Records)

Demo albums

- For Bereavement We Cried (1994)
- The Song of Dancing Sins (1994)
- Ablaze My Sorrow (1995)
