= Grimaze =

Bulgarian metal band

GRIMAZE
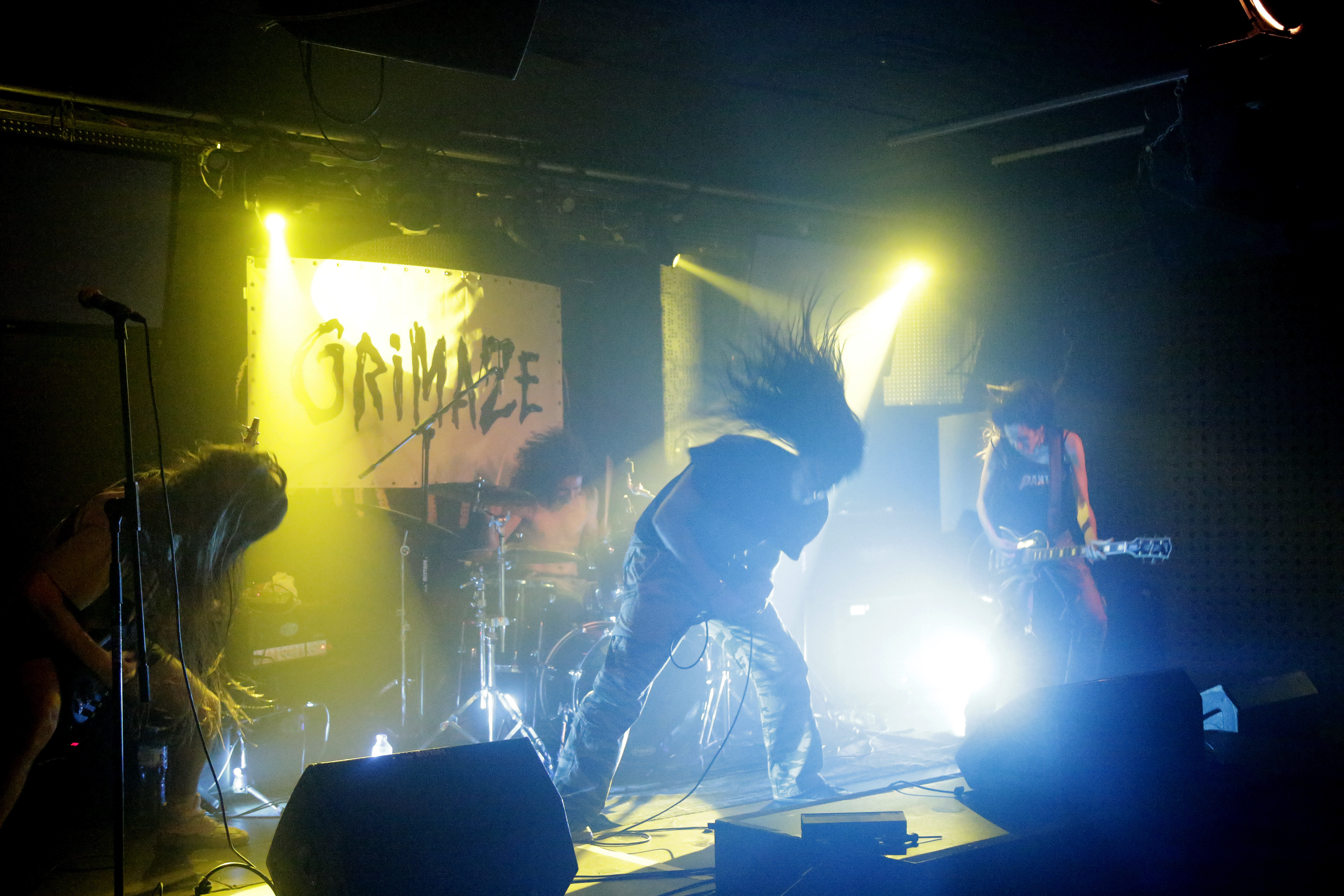
- Grimaze performs at Mixtape 5, Sofia

Background information
- Origin: Sofia, Bulgaria
- Genres: Death metal, groove metal, progressive metal
- Years active: 2013–present
- Members: Georgi Ivanov; Melina Krumova; Philip Kolarov; Pavel Krumov
- Past members: Kris Sadovsky; Anton Dimitrov; Nedislav Miladinov
- Website: grimaze.com

Grimaze (stylized in all caps) is a Bulgarian metal band from Sofia. The band consists of Pavel Krumov - vocals, Melina Krumova - guitar, Georgi Ivanov - guitar and vocals and Philip Kolarov - bass.

== History ==
The band was formed in 2013. In 2016, Grimaze released their first two singles, "Survival of the Fittest" and "My Vow". Later on in the year, the band released their first EP, Dreammares.

In 2018, the band released their album Planet Grimaze, along with a video for the song "Endless Life Force".

In the autumn of 2018, Grimaze was a part of the Anticult Balkan Tour 2018 with Decapitated, Hatesphere, Thy Disease and Dehydrated.

In yearly 2019 Grimaze joined Pestilence and Bleeding Gods on the “Redvced to Ashed Tovr 2019” and played all over the UK and Central Europe. A few months later they also supported Cannibal Corpse. Later the same year Grimaze went on tour with Vader, Hate, Thy Disease and The Noctambulant for a tour of Scandinavia

The band released their latest album "The Heart of a Collapsing Star" in 2024 with Janne Jaloma recording the drums. The album was mixed by Daniel Bergstrand and mastered by Lawrence Mackrory.

== Genre and lyrical themes ==
Grimaze's sound is not easily classified as it is a mixture of several different styles. Genres that have been associated with the band are technical death metal, groove metal and progressive metal.

The band's lyrics reflect on a deeper self-knowledge, improvement and purification.

== Band members ==
Members

- Pavel Krumov – vocals (2013–2017, 2024-present)
- Melina Krumova – guitar (2013–present)
- Georgi Ivanov – vocals(2018-2023), guitar and backing vocals(2023–present)
- Philip Kolarov – bass (2018–present)

Past Members

- Kris Sadovsky – bass (2013–2015)
- Anton Dimitrov – bass (2015–2018)
- Nedislav Miladinov – drums (2013–2020)

== Discography ==
- Dreammares (2016)
- Planet Grimaze (2018)
- The Heart of a Collapsing Star (2024)

== Tours ==
- Anticult Balkan Tour 2018 – Ostrava, Brno, Budapest, Graz, Rijeka, Novi Sad, Sofia, Istanbul, Bucharest, Cluj-Napoca, Timișoara, Kosice, Bratislava
- Spring Break Tour – Sofia, Plovdiv, Burgas, Varna (2016)
- European Tour – Skopje, Krusevac, Niš, Sarajevo, Budapest, Vienna, Munich, Subotica, Bucharest, Sofia (2016)
- Tour "Clean Home" – Dobrich, Burgas, Varna, Sevlievo, Ruse, Plovdiv, Stara Zagora, Pleven, Sofia (2016) – They made a video from the tour: https://www.youtube.com/watch?v=eAO5t4m9Ck0
