= David Parland =

Swedish guitarist (1970–2013)

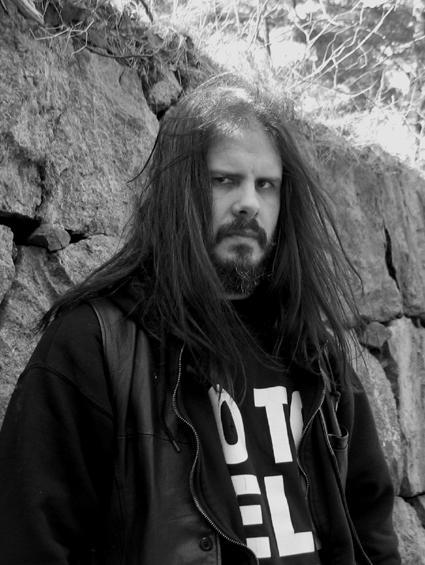
- Parland in 2009

Background information
- Also known as: Blackmoon
- Born: 26 September 1970; Sweden
- Died: 19 March 2013 (aged 42) Sweden
- Genres: Black metal, death metal
- Occupation: Musician
- Instrument: Guitar
- Years active: 1989–2013

David Vincent Parland (26 September 1970 – 19 March 2013), also known by his stage name Blackmoon, was a Swedish metal guitarist noted for his work the bands Dark Funeral, Necrophobic and Infernal, all of which he co-founded.

== Biography ==
Parland was a member of Necrophobic since its inception in 1989, but quit in 1995 to concentrate on Dark Funeral, which he co-founded in 1993. Before leaving Necrophobic, he had written most of the material for their next album. Darkside, with Parland's contributions intact, was released by Necrophobic in 1997, although Parland did not participate in the recording.

Parland ran independent record label Hellspawn Records (also Hellspawn Studio) from 1994 to 2002 in Johanneshov, Stockholm, releasing albums from bands such as Abruptum and his own Dark Funeral, with distribution by House of Kicks, VME, and Sound Pollution. After leaving Dark Funeral in 1996, Parland founded the bands War and Infernal. While keeping a low profile and not being actively involved in any bands since the second line-up of Infernal broke up in 2003, Parland announced in January 2009 that he was working on new material with drummer Tomas Asklund (Gorgoroth, Dissection, ex-Dark Funeral). Demos and a full-length album were to be recorded during 2009. An EP from the band was released on 1 May 2010, entitled The Infernal Return.

In an interview from October 2012, David Parland explained that Infernal went inactive after the EP because of bad financial circumstances, and Parland getting arrested and being sent to a psychiatric district for "detoxification purposes". According to the interview, Parland got a neck injury in a car crash several years before and resorted to painkillers. He eventually became addicted. Parland revealed that Infernal had parted ways for good with drummer Tomas Asklund. Parland was planning on searching for a pro-black/death/heavy metal drummer for the recording of the full-length The Infernal Retribution. The album was intended to be released in late 2013, according to this interview.

Parland died on 19 March 2013, at the age of 42.

== Beliefs ==
Parland was a self-described misanthrope and harbored contempt for organized religion and "political correctness", as well as "slave mentality" and other mindsets which oppose individualism. He agreed with many aspects of Satanic thought, but did not consider himself religious.

== Bands ==
- Necrophobic – guitars (1989–1995, 2000), keyboards (1993)
- Dark Funeral – guitars (1993–1996)
- Infernal – bass, guitars, vocals (1997–2003, 2008–2013)
- Darkwinds (formerly called Blackmoon) – all instruments, vocals (2009–2013)

== Discography ==
=== Infernal ===
- Infernal (EP) (2000) (Hellspawn Records)
- Under Wings of Hell (split) (2002)
- Summon Forth the Beast (EP) (2003) (Hammerheart Records)
- The Infernal Return (EP) (2010) (GoatHorned Productions)

==== Unreleased recordings ====
- Hellhymns, 4-track demo (autumn 2010; to be released by Hellspawn)
- The Infernal Return

=== Darkwinds ===
- Demo (unreleased demo) (1994) (as Blackmoon)
- Demo (2009)
- Untitled album (2010)

=== Necrophobic ===
- Slow Asphyxiation (1990) (demo)
- Unholy Prophecies (1991) (demo)
- The Call (EP) (1992) (Wild Rags Records)
- The Nocturnal Silence (1993) (Black Mark Production)
- Bloodfreezing (1994) (unreleased demo). Now available for download
- Spawned by Evil (MCD) (1996) (Black Mark Production)
- Satanic Blasphemies (2010) (Regain Records) (Special CD box set with the two first demos and the first EP)

=== Dark Funeral ===
- Dark Funeral (EP) (1994) (Hellspawn Records)
- The Secrets of the Black Arts (1996) (No Fashion Records)
- In the Sign... (2000) (Hellspawn Records) (re-release of the self-titled 1994 MCD with 2 Bathory covers as bonus tracks)

=== War ===
- Total War (1996/1997) (Necropolis Records)
- We Are...Total War... (2001) (Hellspawn Records) (compilation CD including Total War and 7 tracks from the unofficial "We Are War" album/session released by Necropolis Records)

== Hellspawn Records releases ==
- Dark Funeral – Dark Funeral (EP) (1994)
- Abruptum – Evil Genius (1995)
- Von – Satanic Blood (1996/97)
- In Conspiracy with Satan – A Tribute to Bathory (1998) (with No Fashion Records)
- Infernal – Infernal (MCD) (2000)
- Dark Funeral – In the Sign... (2000)
- Tyrants from the Abyss – Morbid Angel Tribute (2002)
- Deathwitch – Deathfuck Rituals (2002)
- Maze of Torment – The Unmarked Graves (2003)
