= Where Shadows Forever Reign =

Studio album by Dark Funeral
- Released: 3 June 2016
- Recorded: 1–26 May 2016
- Genre: Black metal
- Length: 45:38
- Language: English
- Label: Century Media
- Producer: Daniel Bergstrand; Lord Ahriman

Dark Funeral chronology
Angelus Exuro pro Eternus (2009)	Where Shadows Forever Reign (2016)	We Are the Apocalypse (2022)

Professional ratings
Review scores
Source	Rating
Metal Hammer	7/7
Metal Injection	7/10

Where Shadows Forever Reign is the sixth studio album by Swedish black metal band Dark Funeral. The album was released through Century Media Records on 3 June 2016. Where Shadows Forever Reign is the first album to feature vocalist Heljarmadr and the last to feature drummer Dominator. The album was recorded in Dugout Studios in Uppsala, Sweden and the cover art for the album was created by artist Kristian 'Necrolord' Wåhlin.

== Track listing ==
No.	Title	Lyrics	Music	Length
1.	"Unchain My Soul"	Heljarmadr	Lord Ahriman, Dominator	5:20
2.	"As One We Shall Conquer"	Heljarmadr	Lord Ahriman, Dominator	4:43
3.	"Beast Above Man"	Heljarmadr	Lord Ahriman	4:44
4.	"As I Ascend"	Heljarmadr, Lord Ahriman	Lord Ahriman	6:18
5.	"Temple of Ahriman"	Heljarmadr, Lord Ahriman	Lord Ahriman	5:21
6.	"The Eternal Eclipse"	Heljarmadr	Lord Ahriman	4:14
7.	"To Carve Another Wound"	Heljarmadr	Lord Ahriman	4:44
8.	"Nail Them to the Cross"	Heljarmadr	Lord Ahriman, Dominator	4:42
9.	"Where Shadows Forever Reign"	Heljarmadr	Lord Ahriman	5:32
Total length:				45:38

== Personnel ==
=== Dark Funeral ===
- Heljarmadr – vocals
- Lord Ahriman – lead guitar, bass
- Chaq Mol – rhythm guitar
- Dominator – drums

=== Production ===
- Necrolord – Artwork
- George Nerantzis – Engineering, Mixing, Mastering
- Daniel Bergstrand – Producer, Engineering, Mixing
- Lord Ahriman – Producer, Layout, Photography
- Michaela Barkensjö – Photography
- Carsten Drescher – Layout

== Charts ==
Chart (2016)	Peak position
Austrian Albums (Ö3 Austria)	49
Belgian Albums (Ultratop Flanders)	96
Belgian Albums (Ultratop Wallonia)	111
Finnish Albums (Suomen virallinen lista)	15
German Albums (Offizielle Top 100)	38
Swedish Albums (Sverigetopplistan)	31
Swiss Albums (Schweizer Hitparade)	44
