= We Are the Apocalypse =

Studio album by Dark Funeral
- Released: 18 March 2022
- Studio: Studio 33
- Genre: Black metal
- Length: 43:47
- Language: English
- Label: Century Media
- Producer: Daniel Bergstrand; Lord Ahriman; Heljarmadr

Dark Funeral chronology
Where Shadows Forever Reign (2016)	We Are the Apocalypse (2022)

Professional ratings
Review scores
Source	Rating
Blabbermouth.net	8.5/10 stars
Metal Hammer	4.5/7 stars

We Are the Apocalypse is the seventh studio album by Swedish black metal band Dark Funeral. The album was released through Century Media Records on 18 March 2022. The album is the first to feature the band's new drummer, Jalomaah, and bass player, Adra-Melek. The album was recorded in Studio 33 and was engineered by Fredrik Thordendal and Daniel Bergstrand. It peaked at No. 6, No. 13, and No. 28 in the German, Finnish, and Swiss albums charts respectively.

The album’s first song, "Nightfall", is their fastest song at 292 bpm of 146 bpm, in half-time

== Music videos ==
The first music video from the album, for the song "Let the Devil In", was released on 7 January 2022. It was created by Polish production company Grupa 13.

The second music video to be released, also created by Grupa 13, was for the song "Leviathan"; it was released on 3 March 2022.

== Track listing ==
All music by Lord Ahriman. All lyrics by Heljarmadr

No.	Title	Length
1.	"Nightfall"	5:14
2.	"Let the Devil In"	4:40
3.	"When Our Vengeance Is Done"	4:20
4.	"Nosferatu"	4:41
5.	"When I'm Gone"	5:46
6.	"Beyond the Grave"	5:08
7.	"A Beast to Praise"	4:49
8.	"Leviathan"	4:34
9.	"We Are the Apocalypse"	4:33
Total length:		43:47

== Personnel ==
=== Dark Funeral ===
- Heljarmadr – vocals
- Lord Ahriman – lead guitar
- Adra-Melek – bass guitar
- Chaq Mol – rhythm guitar
- Jalomaah – drums

=== Production ===
- Marcelo Vasco – artwork and layout
- Fredrik Thordendal – engineering
- Daniel Bergstrand – producer, engineering, mixing
- Lord Ahriman – producer
- Hjeldamadr – producer
- Bartosz Szydłowski – photography
- Paul Logus – mastering

== Charts ==
Chart performance for We Are the Apocalypse
Chart (2022)	Peak position
Austrian Albums (Ö3 Austria)	29
Belgian Albums (Ultratop Flanders)	112
Belgian Albums (Ultratop Wallonia)	183
Finnish Albums (Suomen virallinen lista)	13
German Albums (Offizielle Top 100)	6
Swedish Albums (Sverigetopplistan)	31
Swiss Albums (Schweizer Hitparade)	28
