= Diabolis Interium =

Studio album by Dark Funeral
- Released: 24 September 2001
- Recorded: 21 January–2 March 2001
- Genre: Black metal
- Length: 36:20
- Languages: English, Latin
- Labels: No Fashion, Necropolis
- Producer: Peter Tägtgren

Dark Funeral chronology
Vobiscum Satanas (1998)	Diabolis Interium (2001)	De Profundis Clamavi Ad Te Domine (2004)

Professional ratings
Review scores
Source	Rating
About.com	4/5 stars
Allmusic	2.5/5 stars

Diabolis Interium (grammatically incorrect Latin, intended to mean "Devil Within") is the third studio album by Swedish black metal band Dark Funeral, released on 24 September 2001. It was recorded and mixed between 21 January and 2 March at The Abyss Studio and was the band's last album to be released through No Fashion Records. Diabolis Interium is the first album to feature drummer Matte Modin and the only album to feature guitarist Dominion and also marked the end of vocalist Emperor Magus Caligula's role as a bassist for Dark Funeral, both studio and live. The Regain Records 2007 re-release contains a second disc consisting of the EP Teach Children to Worship Satan.

== Track listing ==
Original release
No.	Title	Length
1.	"The Arrival of Satan's Empire"	3:46
2.	"Hail Murder"	5:02
3.	"Goddess of Sodomy"	4:11
4.	"Diabolis Interium"	4:20
5.	"An Apprentice of Satan"	6:04
6.	"Thus I Have Spoken"	4:59
7.	"Armageddon Finally Comes"	3:21
8.	"Heart of Ice"	4:34

2007 Reissue Bonus Disc (Teach Children to Worship Satan)
No.	Title	Writer(s)	Length
1.	"An Apprentice of Satan 2000"	Caligula, Ahriman	6:05
2.	"The Trial" (King Diamond cover)	King Diamond	5:26
3.	"Dead Skin Mask" (Slayer cover)	Jeff Hanneman, Tom Araya	4:46
4.	"Remember the Fallen" (Sodom cover)	Chris Witchhunter, Frank Blackfire	4:15
5.	"Pagan Fears" (Mayhem cover)	Dead, Euronymous, Hellhammer	6:31

2013 Reissue Bonus Tracks
No.	Title	Length
14.	"Hail Murder" (Live in South America 2003)	5:08
15.	"Thus I Have Spoken" (Live in South America 2003)	5:00
16.	"Armageddon Finally Comes" (Live in South America 2003)	4:07
Total length:		77:39

== Credits ==
=== Dark Funeral ===
- Emperor Magus Caligula – vocals, bass guitar
- Lord Ahriman – guitar
- Dominion – guitar
- Matte Modin – drums

=== Additional personnel ===
- Peter Tägtgren – mastering
- Michael Johansson – photography
- Daniel "Morbid" Valeriani – cover design, artwork
- Lars Szöke – studio technician

== Charts ==
Chart (2001)	Peak position
Swedish Albums Chart	45
