= Negator (band) =

German metal band

Negator was a German black metal band. They released five albums.

The band was formed in 2003 in Hamburg.

Vocalis Steve "Nachtgarm" Marbs briefly sang in Dark Funeral. As Nachtgarm retired from music in 2021, Negator also disbanded.

== Select discography ==
- Old Black (2004, Remedy Records)
- Die eisernen Verse (2005, Remedy Records)
- Panzer Metal (2010, Remedy Records)
- The Great Atrocities (EP, 2012, Viva Hate Records)
- Gates to the Pantheon (2013, Viva Hate Records)
- Vnitas Pvritas Existentia (2019, Massacre Records)
