= Lord Ahriman =

Swedish guitarist

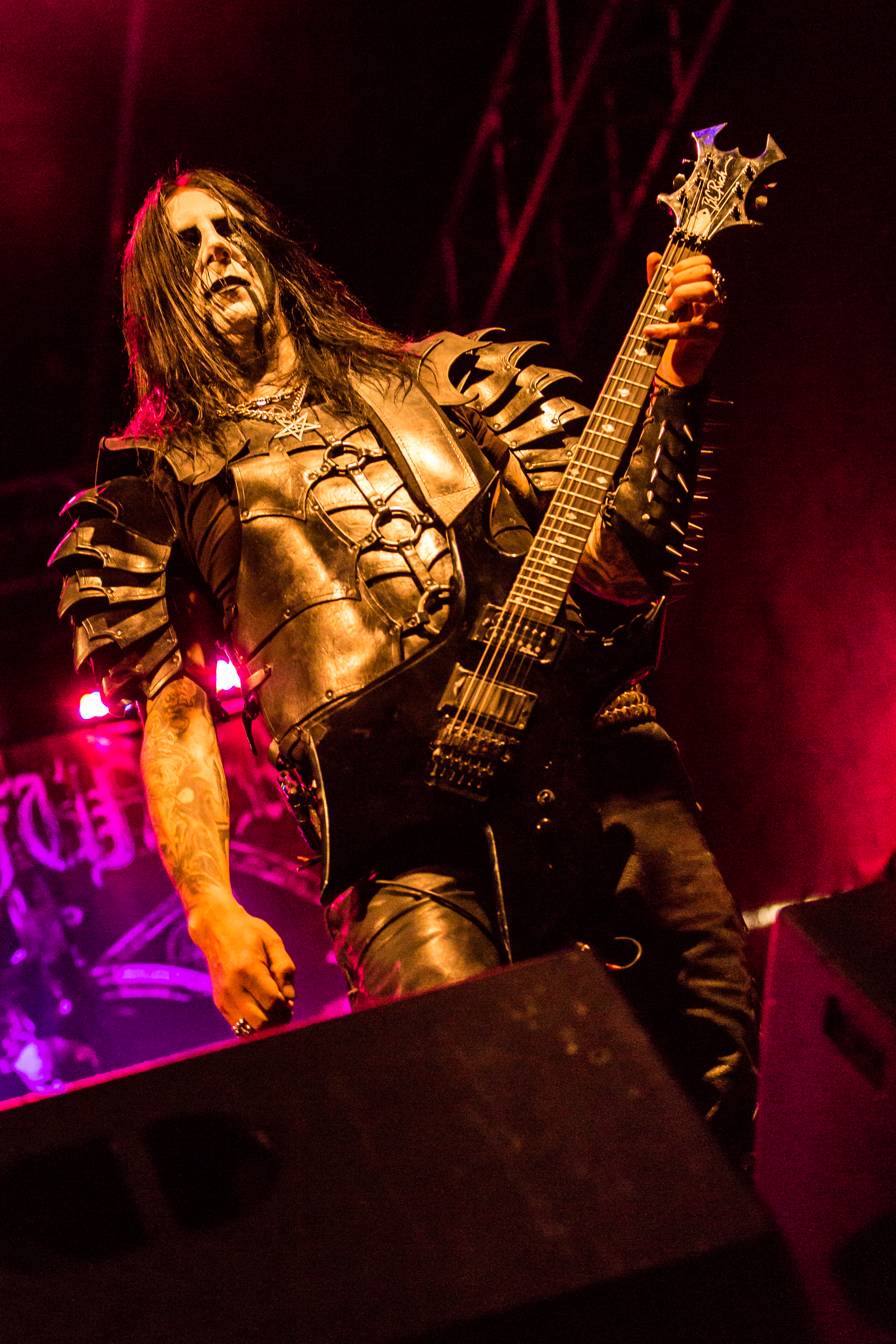
- Lord Ahriman at Rock unter den Eichen 2017

Background information
- Birth name: Mikael Jan Svanberg
- Born: 13 November 1972 (age 52)
- Origin: Luleå, Sweden
- Genres: Black metal, death metal
- Occupation(s): Musician, songwriter
- Instrument: Guitar
- Years active: 1989–present
- Member of: Dark Funeral, Wolfen Society
- Formerly of: Satan's Disciples

Mikael Jan Svanberg (born 13 November 1972), better known as Lord Ahriman, is a Swedish musician who is the primary guitarist, songwriter and sole founding member of the black metal band Dark Funeral. He is also the rhythm guitarist in the band Wolfen Society. His stage name is derived from Ahriman (Persian: اهریمن), the evil equivalent of the deity Ahura Mazda in Zoroastrianism.

== Biography ==
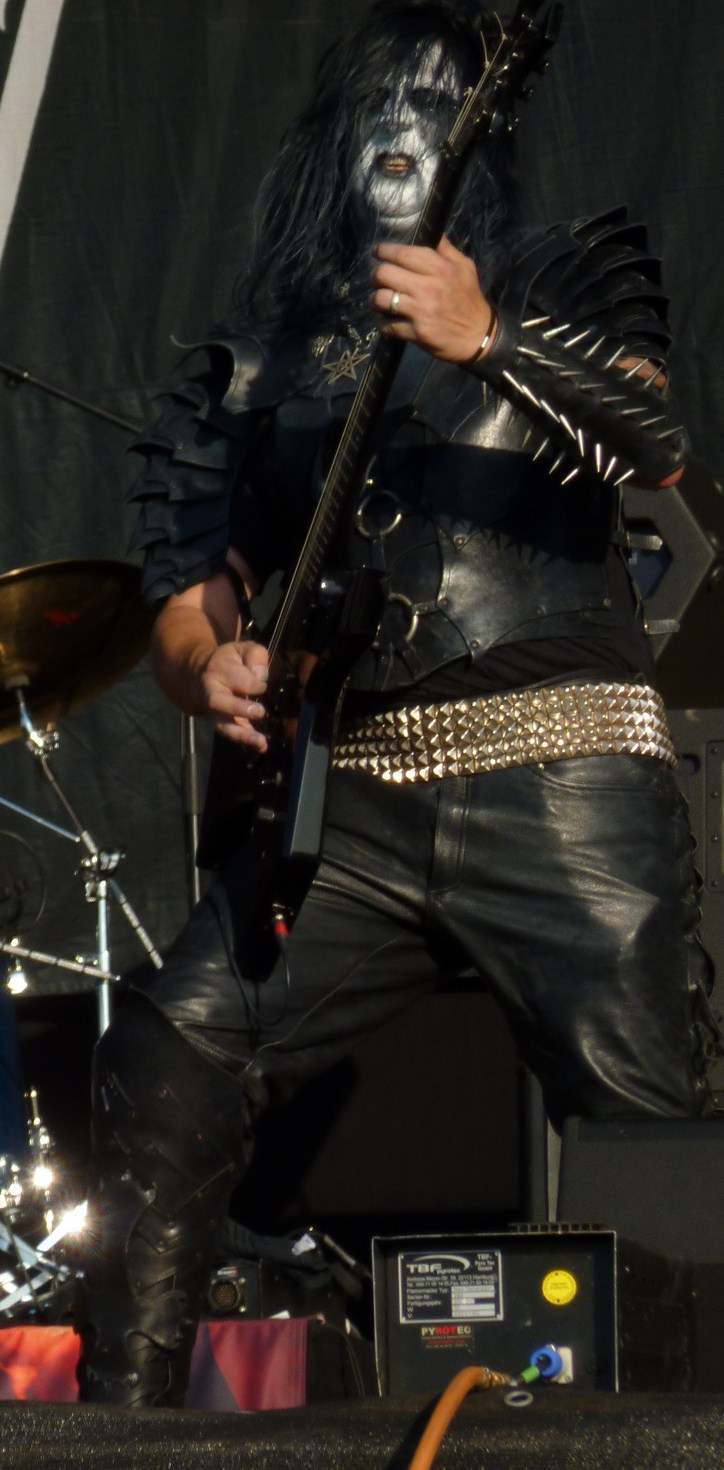
Ahriman in 2012

Originally from Luleå, a small town in the north of Sweden, Ahriman developed an interest in music from a very young age. Hailing from a somewhat musical family, he cited his grandmother, mother and younger sister as influences and he started songwriting himself between 1989 and 1990.

Harbouring interests for Satanism (ostensibly that of the LaVeyan variant) and extreme metal as a teenager, he was introverted in his environment. When he was eighteen years old, he left for Stockholm, home to extreme metal acts such as Entombed and Dismember, whom Ahriman already knew personally.

He has also been an active participant in death metal. Before he played in Dark Funeral, he played in a blackened death metal band called Satan's Disciples, and he has a side-project called Wolfen Society, who released an MCD "Conquer Divine" in 2001, although difficulties with No Fashion Records hindered its success.

Ahriman and other Dark Funeral members were forced to have side-jobs after No Fashion did not grant them royalties for their work on Dark Funeral's backcatalogue. Consequently Dark Funeral filed suit against No Fashion, and have since spearheaded a campaign against "corrupt" record labels. In October 2008, it was announced that Ahriman and Emperor Magus Caligula succeeded in obtaining the rights to Dark Funeral's entire backcatalogue.

In 2013, Ahriman and Dark Funeral signed to Century Media Records for their upcoming new studio album.

== Discography ==
=== Dark Funeral ===
==== Studio releases ====
- The Secrets of the Black Arts (1996)
- Vobiscum Satanas (1998)
- Diabolis Interium (2001)
- Attera Totus Sanctus (2005)
- Angelus Exuro pro Eternus (2009)
- Where Shadows Forever Reign (2016)
- We Are the Apocalypse (2022)

==== EPs ====
- Dark Funeral (1994)
- Teach the Children to Worship Satan (2000)

==== Live releases ====
- De Profundis Clamavi ad Te Domine (2004)

==== Compilations ====
- In the Sign… (2000)

==== DVDs ====
- Attera Orbis Terrarum – Part I (2007)
- Attera Orbis Terrarum – Part II (2008)

=== Wolfen Society ===
==== EPs ====
- Conquer Divine (2001)
