= Angelus Exuro pro Eternus =

Studio album by Dark Funeral
- Released: 18 November 2009
- Recorded: July–August 2009
- Genre: Black metal
- Length: 46:58
- Language: English, Latin
- Label: Regain
- Producer: Peter Tägtgren

Dark Funeral chronology
Attera Totus Sanctus (2005)	Angelus Exuro pro Eternus (2009)	Where Shadows Forever Reign (2016)

Professional ratings
Review scores
Source	Rating
Truemetal (IT)	81%
Rock and Metal in My Blood (IT)	8.5/10
Metallus (IT)	7/10
Metal Storm	7.7/10
Sputnik Music	4.5/5 stars
Metalitalia (IT)	7.5/10
Metal Rage	88%
Metal Reviews	81%
Metal Underground	4/5 stars
Ultimate Guitar	8.75/10
Metal.de (DE)	8/10
Metal1 (DE)	8/10
Metal Crypt	4/5 stars
Metalfan (NL)	82%
Aux Portes du Metal (FR)	8.5/10
El Portal del Metal (ES)	4.5/5 stars
Sea of Tranquility	
Power Metal (DE)	9/10
Reflections of Darkness	9/10
Metal News (DE)	2.5/5 stars
About.com	4/5 stars
Allmusic	2.5/5 stars
Chronicles of Chaos	5.5/10 stars

Angelus Exuro pro Eternus (grammatically incorrect Latin intended to mean "Angels Burned for Eternity") is the fifth studio album by Swedish black metal band Dark Funeral. The album was officially released on 18 November 2009 via Regain Records. It was recorded at The Abyss Studio in Grangärde, Sweden, with engineer and producer Peter Tägtgren, who also produced Dark Funeral's earlier studio albums (with the exception of Attera Totus Sanctus). The record was then mastered by Jonas Kjellgren at the Black Lodge Studios. Angelus Exuro pro Eternus is the last album to feature vocalist Emperor Magus Caligula, the only album to feature bassist B-Force and the first to feature Dominator on drums.

Upon release, the album was met with rave reviews by music critics and band fans, with only few reviewers giving the work negative or average ratings.

Musically, it has been described as the band's most technical and varied album to date, with considerably more progression and innovation while remaining "true to its roots". The cover artwork for Angelus Exuro Pro Eternus was created by Daniel "Morbid" Valeriani.

== Video material ==
The album is also available with a bonus live DVD, which contains approximately 55 minutes of previously unreleased material. The DVD was professionally filmed with 6 cameras during the band's highly acclaimed 15th anniversary special show during the Peace & Love festival in Borlänge, Sweden, on 28 June 2008. The album also includes two versions (censored and uncensored) of their video for the track "My Funeral". The video was shot over the weekend of 21–23 August and was released on 4 October 2009.

The video was shot in and outside an old and closed mental hospital. The environment was just killer. And besides, it suited the video theme perfect!

— Lord Ahriman

On October 7, 2009, three days later after the initial air of the video, after nearly 30,000 views, the full and uncensored version of "My Funeral" had been pulled from Myspace, causing a backlash from fans. This forced the band to upload a censored version of the video in response.

So, it took about three days, and from what I have been told, 30,000 views, for MySpace to pull our new majestic video for 'My Funeral'. That's fucking lame, to say the least! Even though I respect MySpace and their rules, I'm totally against censorship. The way I see it, and as long as it's not illegal (and there sure wasn't anything illegal in the video), if you find something on the Internet you don't like, just don't fucking watch it! How hard can it be? Let everyone else who enjoy it do so without your interfering. Either way, whoever flagged it should know that you just did us a great, great favor; thank you! Now people will hunt the uncensored version and I'm absolutely sure that your pathetic action will increase the plays with thousands and thousands of views. So, once again, thank you, but fuck you! I hope the rest of you enjoy our new tune and video anyway!

— Lord Ahriman

== Track listing ==
All lyrics are written by Emperor Magus Caligula.

No.	Title	Music	Length
1.	"The End of Human Race"	Lord Ahriman, Chaq Mol	4:43
2.	"The Birth of the Vampiir"	Lord Ahriman	4:50
3.	"Stigmata"	Lord Ahriman	5:06
4.	"My Funeral"	Lord Ahriman	5:30
5.	"Angelus Exuro pro Eternus"	Lord Ahriman, Chaq Mol	5:04
6.	"Demons of Five"	Lord Ahriman, Chaq Mol	4:48
7.	"Declaration of Hate"	Lord Ahriman, Chaq Mol	5:24
8.	"In My Dreams"	Lord Ahriman	6:30
9.	"My Latex Queen"	Lord Ahriman	5:21
Total length:			46:58

2013 Reissue Bonus Tracks
No.	Title	Length
10.	"King Antichrist" (Live in Buenos Aires 2006)	5:53
11.	"Diabolis Interium" (Live in Buenos Aires 2006)	4:06
12.	"Ravenna Strigoi Mortii" (Live in Buenos Aires 2006)	3:51
13.	"Open The Gates" (Live in Buenos Aires 2006)	4:02
14.	"Atrum Regina" (Live in Buenos Aires 2006)	6:07
Total length:		70:52

=== DVD track listing ===
Live at Peace & Love festival on June 28, 2008, in Borlänge, Sweden.

1. "Intro"
2. "King Antichrist"
3. "Diabolis Interium"
4. "The Secrets of the Black Arts"
5. "The Arrival of Satan's Empire"
6. "Goddess of Sodomy"
7. "666 Voices Inside"
8. "Vobiscum Satanas"
9. "Hail Murder"
10. "Atrum Regina"
11. "An Apprentice of Satan"

== Personnel ==
=== Dark Funeral ===
- Lord Ahriman – guitar
- Emperor Magus Caligula – vocals
- Chaq Mol – guitar
- Dominator – drums
- B-Force – bass guitar

=== Production ===
- Peter Tägtgren – production, mixing, engineering
- Jonas Kjellgren – mastering
- Carlos Aguilar – photography
