= Rocket 95.3 FM =

Swedish radio station

Rocket 95.3 FM "The Rock Home of Stockholm" is a radio station that began broadcasting on THS Radio 95.3 in Stockholm, Sweden on August 27, 1996, making it the longest running rock radio station in Stockholm.

== History ==
It was founded by Eric Paglia, who was Music Director at the original Bandit Radio 105.5 in Stockholm.

== Format ==
Rocket 95.3 FM is characterized by a broad rock format that includes an array of genres including indie, punk, garage, Americana, alternative, new wave, hard rock and classic rock.

All periods of the rock era from 1955 and onwards are represented, featuring a wide variety of artists from the United States, the United Kingdom and Sweden as well as other countries.

== Today ==
Rocket 95.3 FM is broadcast in English, and was one of the first stations in Sweden to be streamed on the internet, via its website [www.rocket.fm].

It is the Stockholm affiliate for the syndicated program Little Steven's Underground Garage.

Interviews are a prominent part of the Rocket 95.3 FM profile, with numerous international and Swedish artists having visited the station over the years.

Rocket.FM has also been active in the Stockholm rock scene, arranging clubs such as Devolution, Grace, and Riff Raff.

== DJs ==
The station today features on-air personalities such as Marc the Shark, El Padre, Rob Shay, Nordic Nick, John Gladwin, Olof Bäckström, Ed O'Neill, Uncle Keef, Melanie Rosenthal, and Eric in the Afternoon.
