= Dark Funeral =

Swedish black metal band

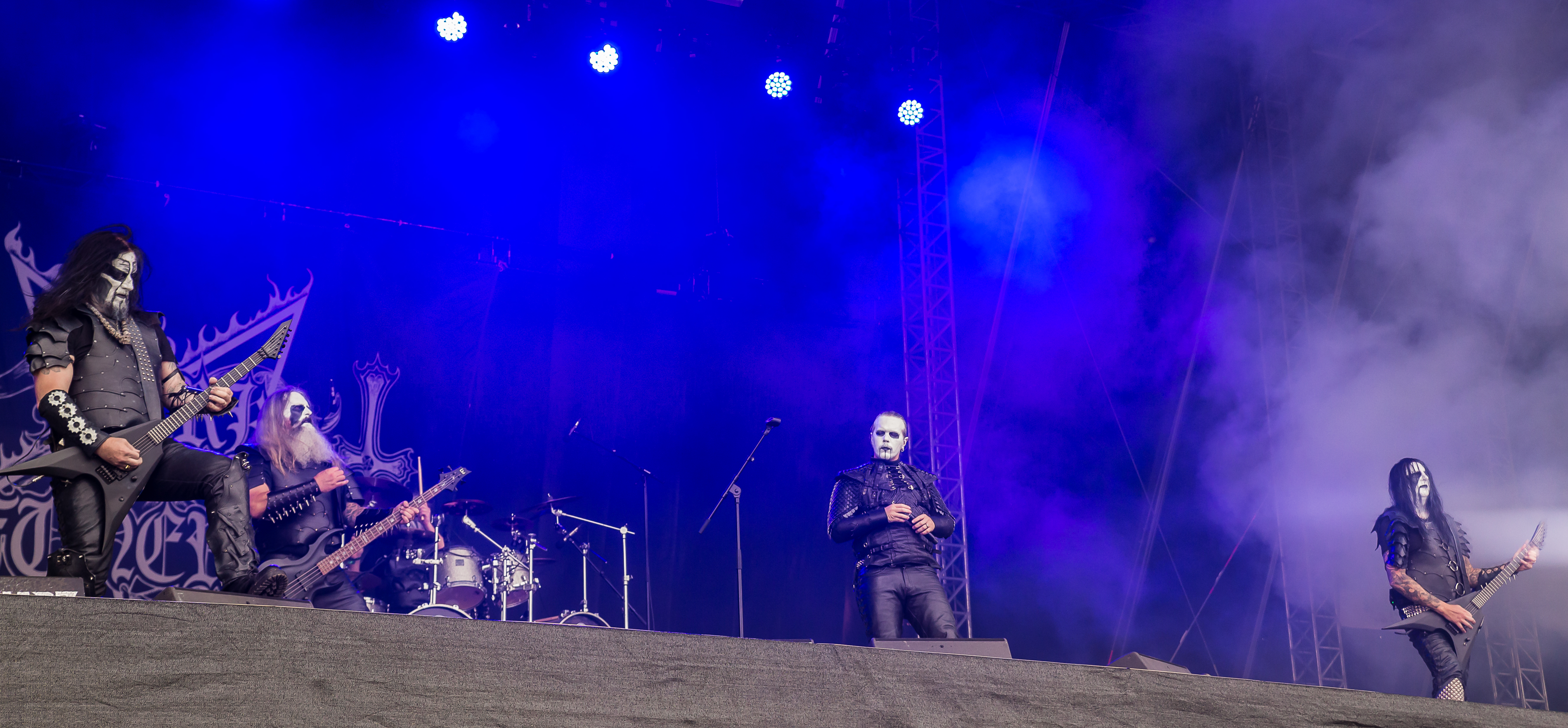
- Dark Funeral performing in 2022

Background information
- Origin: Stockholm, Sweden
- Genre: Black metal
- Years active: 1993–present
- Labels: No Fashion; Necropolis; Regain; Metal Blade; Candlelight; Century Media
- Members: Lord Ahriman; Heljarmadr; Chaq Mol; Jalomaah; Adra- Melek
- Past members: See list of Dark Funeral members
- Website: darkfuneral.se

Dark Funeral is a Swedish black metal band from Stockholm, founded by guitarists Blackmoon and Lord Ahriman in 1993, during the second wave of black metal.

The group have released seven full-length albums and are prominent in the Swedish black metal scene.

== History ==
=== Dark Funeral EP and The Secrets of the Black Arts ===
In 1993, guitarists David Parland, known as Blackmoon, and Mikael Svanberg, known as Lord Ahriman, established Dark Funeral. They recruited bassist and vocalist Paul Mäkitalo, known as Themgoroth and formerly of the band Scum, and Joel Andersson, known as Draugen, shortly thereafter. In January 1994, Dark Funeral recorded their self-titled EP at Unisound Studio with Dan Swanö of Edge of Sanity as producer, releasing it on 4 May, 1994. That day, Dark Funeral performed their first show at Lusa Lottes Pub in Oslo, Norway, alongside fellow live debuts Gorgoroth, and Marduk, who were performing their first show abroad. Draugen departed Dark Funeral following the EP, and Equimanthorn replaced him.

In 1995, Dark Funeral signed with No Fashion Records, and wrote songs for their debut full-length album. The band recorded several tracks that would appear on The Secrets of the Black Arts at Unisound Studio with Swanö, but re-recorded the album with Peter Tägtgren of Hypocrisy at The Abyss Studio, adding the song "When Angels Forever Die" and a cover of Von's "Satanic Blood", for their debut album. Concerning the re-recording their debut album, Blackmoon told Rites of the Black Moon Webzine in 2009 that the initial recordings were flat due to Swanö's exhaustion and to the quality of recording gear that Swanö had recently acquired. Shortly after recording the album at The Abyss, Dark Funeral played their first festival show, Under the Black Sun I, in Berlin. A few weeks prior, Emperor Magus Caligula (Magnus 'Masse' Broberg, original vocalist of Hypocrisy) replaced Themgoroth, becoming a permanent member during the summer of 1995. Concerning Themgoroth's departure, Blackmoon said that Themgoroth was unable to fulfil the quality the band expected of their live performances. On 28 January 1996, The Secrets of the Black Arts was released and licensed to Metal Blade in North America and Mystic Productions in Poland. Equimanthorn was replaced with Alzazmon, later known for his work with Dissection and Gorgoroth. The line-up of Emperor Magus Caligula, Lord Ahriman, Alzazmon and Blackmoon recorded their versions of Bathory's "Call from the Grave" and "Equimanthorn" for the Bathory tribute In Conspiracy with Satan. (These also appeared later re-mastered for the re-titled re-release of the band's debut In the Sign…). Blackmoon departed Dark Funeral at the end of 1996, citing conflicts with Lord Ahriman. Together with Necromass, the band embarked on the Satanic War Tour I throughout Europe.

=== Vobiscum Satanas and Teach Children to Worship Satan ===
The second leg of the Satanic War Tour followed with Ancient and Bal-Sagoth as support. Dark Funeral played their first show in America at the Expo of the Extreme festival in Chicago. From there, the band embarked on The American Satanic Crusade Tour with Usurper in support. The tour was supposed to feature Acheron and Deströyer 666, but both cancelled. In September, the band returned to The Abyss Studio to record Vobiscum Satanas.

The Ineffable Kings of Darkness Tour with Enthroned and Liar of Golgotha took place with Dominion as a session bass player. The band made their second major festival appearance at the Swedish Hultsfreds festival. After the festival, Typhos was fired and Dominion became the band's second guitarist, while Caligula reverted to vocals and bass.

Before the band headed out on the Bleed for Satan tour with Cannibal Corpse and Infernäl Mäjesty, Alzazmon left, and Gaahnfaust, who was in the band in 1996 for a short time, was recruited. The band returned overseas for another mini-tour, Black Plague Across the West, when they played in Mexico for the first time before they headed to the US and California. Afterwards, they embarked on their longest and most successful European tour, The Satanic Inquisition, with Dimmu Borgir.

With engineer Tommy Tägtgren, the band recorded the EP Teach Children to Worship Satan at The Abyss Studio B (featuring the song "An Apprentice of Satan" and covers of Slayer, Mayhem, Sodom and King Diamond). For the EP, the band filmed a live video for "An Apprentice of Satan". They joined Deicide, Immortal, and Cannibal Corpse for the No Mercy Festivals. After Gaahnfaust's departure, Matte Modin of Defleshed joined the band as a permanent member, and debuted at the With Full Force festival.

=== Diabolis Interium and De Profundis Clamavi Ad Te Domine ===
In January/February, the band again entered The Abyss Studio, enlisting the help of producer Peter Tägtgren and studio technician Lars Szöke, to record their third full-length album, Diabolis Interium. Due to the overwhelming positive response to the new album from both the public and the press, the band was able to secure deals that brought their music across to a much wider audience, with licenses in Japan (Soundholic Co. Ltd), Brazil (Hellion Records), Poland (Mystic Productions), Romania (Rocris Disc), Bulgaria (Rocris Disc), Thailand (S.Stack Co. Ltd), Russia (Irond Records Ltd), Taiwan, Hong Kong, and China (Magnus Music). With the exceptional response to the album in Brazil, which was released through Hellion Records, another local label, Somber Records licensed the band's entire back catalogue. As soon as Diabolis Interium was released, Dark Funeral once again went on tour. First they toured Europe, supported by Tidfall, Anorexia Nervosa and Ragnarok. On this tour, the band brought in Mikael Hedlund (Hypocrisy) to play the bass. After this tour, Mikael resumed duties with his main band. They recruited Richard Cabeza for the session bassist slot. The band also toured the US, supporting their longtime friends Cannibal Corpse. With Diabolis Interium, the Swedish radio station Rocket 95.3 FM nominated Dark Funeral in the category “Best Swedish Hard Rock Band”. Other bands nominated at the same time and in the same category were Breach, Entombed, and Arise.

In October 2002, the band embarked on their first tour in the Far East, which included shows in Japan, Taiwan, and Singapore. The band was the first Western extreme metal band to play Taiwan and Singapore. On 29 November 2002, the band and MNW/No Fashion Records announced that they were no longer contractually-bound to Necropolis Records, who had licensed the band's 2001 release Diabolis Interium for North America. Official termination of contract papers had already been delivered to Necropolis Records, putting an official end to Dark Funeral's tenure with said record label. This was a result of Necropolis' alleged breach of contract with the band and label.

After the Asian tour, guitarist Dominion felt it was in the best interests of both the band and himself to resign his position, due to commitment to studies. Dominion officially resigned upon the band's completion of their Asian tour. He would later explore other musical options. After this the band begin auditioning guitarists to replace the departed Dominion. A new guitarist was found in the form of Chaq Mol, who had a long history in different local metal acts. He is also in the two-man doom/black metal project Mordichrist. He made his official debut with the band at Wacken Open Air 2003.

After a successful gig at the Wacken Open Air Festival in Germany, the band headed down to South America for a tour through Brazil, Chile, and Colombia. This tour became one of the most successful ever undertaken by the band. During the tour, the band recorded a couple of the shows with plans to release a live album. After sifting through the recorded material with their live sound engineer (Erik Lidbom, Hitfire Productions), De Profundis Clamavi Ad Te Domine was born.

Dark Funeral officially announced their split from MNW/No Fashion Records, after the band did not receive royalties for their back-catalogue. A series of legal battles began, where Ahriman and Caligula sought the rights to Dark Funeral's back-catalogue. Shortly after, the band signed a license deal with Regain Records for their live album De Profundis Clamavi Ad Te Domine, which was licensed to several other countries. On 31 May 2005, the album was released in the US through Candlelight Records.

In January 2004, the band partnered with Goatwhore and Zyklon in Japan on the Extreme the Dojo Volume 9. Shortly after, the band continued to tour with a spate of Mexican dates. The band made appearances at festivals including Spain's Piorno Rock (with Sepultura, Saxon, Destruction, Lacuna Coil, among others), Finland's Tuska Open Air Metal Festival, and X-Mass Festivals across Europe. The band appeared as the headlining act at Germany's Party San, Swedish Nordic Rage, and LA's Gathering of the Bestial Legions Festival. The band also played in Italy together with Defleshed for a short burst of dates. In December 2004, Dark Funeral resumed touring by first playing Israel, and then hitting Russia and Ukraine for the Black Winter Days Tour, together with openers Horned NecroCannibals and Icewind Blast.

=== Attera Totus Sanctus, and Attera Orbis Terrarum Part I and II ===
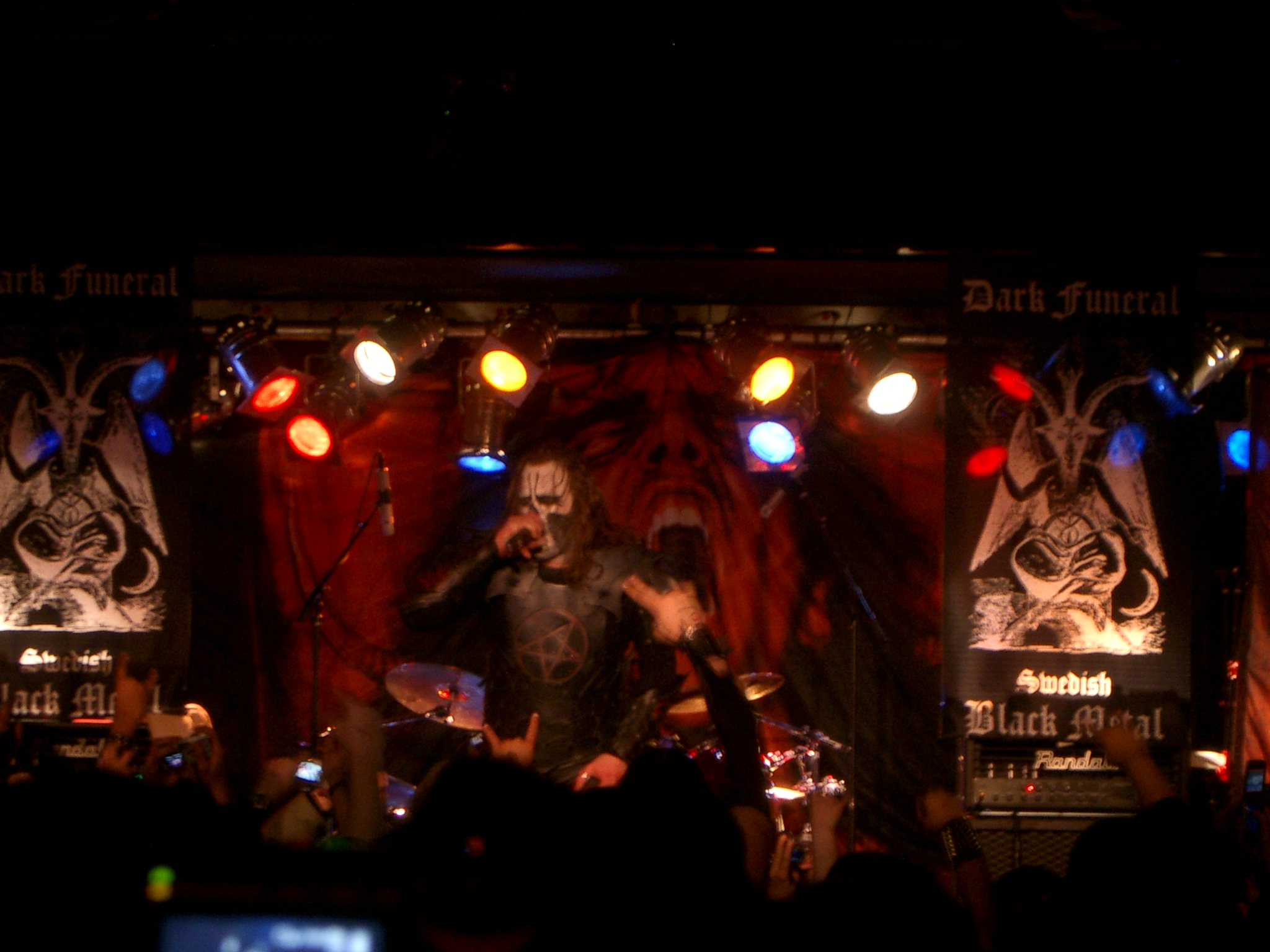
Dark Funeral performing at BB Kings, New York City, 2007

On 20 January 2005, they signed a new record deal with Regain Records. The band concentrated on writing material for a new full-length album, yet made time to perform at the Metal Mind Festival in Poland, before joining the No Mercy Tour with Six Feet Under, Nile and Dying Fetus, among others.

On 18 August, Dark Funeral's next album, Attera Totus Sanctus, was completed. It entered the Swedish top 40 at number 35. The new album became Album of The Month at Metallian.com. In November, Dark Funeral began working with Dragon Production, a division of A.S.S. Concert & Promotion GmbH. Dragon Production were entrusted with handling the band's tour bookings for Europe.

In 2006, Dark Funeral performed on a tour in South America. On 8 October 2006, at a concert in Lima, Peru, they were forced to perform without their vocalist and bassist, Caligula, due to illness. Many angry fans started a riot and vandalized the properties near the venue. Following the riot, all the band's instruments were confiscated by Peruvian police. After a week, the band announced they had to postpone their upcoming concerts in Latvia and Lithuania because of this unfortunate situation.

In early 2007, Dark Funeral toured North America with Enslaved. In April 2007, the band had planned an Eastern European tour to Russia, Ukraine and the Baltic states. It was around this time that Matte Modin had allegedly concocted false stories in order to avoid playing with the band. He first alleged that he had an infection in his arm, and could not participate on the Eastern European tour. However, it emerged that he had chosen to tour with the punk band Raised Fist instead. After returning from the Metalferry show in Sweden in between, Matte announced to the rest of the band that he could not go to the Baltic states, as it was his son's birthday. Dark Funeral soon realised Matte Modin's motives. Consequently, the upcoming tour was cancelled, and Matte Modin was ejected from the band. In June 2007, the band announced Nils Fjellström, alias Dominator (also in Aeon and Sanctification, among others), as their new drummer. The band had a special appearance playing live on the pornographic film Club Satan: The Witches Sabbath, to which they also contributed their song "King Antichrist" off Attera Totus Sanctus.

The band toured North America again in 2007, and re-issued their first three albums, each with a bonus disc of material. In 2007 and 2008, the band released Attera Orbis Terrarum – Part I and Attera Orbis Terrarum – Part II, respectively.

On 24 October 2008, it was announced that the Supreme Court of Sweden had ruled in favour of Dark Funeral in the dispute with MNW/No Fashion Records.

=== Angelus Exuro pro Eternus ===
After several shows promoting the album, Dark Funeral released their fifth studio album in 2009, Angelus Exuro pro Eternus. They also shot a controversial music video for "My Funeral".

The latter half of 2010 saw the band consisting of only Ahriman and Chaq Mol on guitars, following the departure of Emperor Magus Caligula in July 2010, and B-Force and Dominator in the coming months. Caligula's was arguably the most significant: after being in Dark Funeral for fifteen years as vocalist and lyricist, he had spent the longest time in the band, aside from Ahriman. It was announced Caligula was to be married and that he sought to settle down in his new life. B-Force left the band of his own volition. Ahriman used this time to work on new material, in the absence of a full line-up for live performances and studio recording.

On 30 June 2011, Dark Funeral announced that Nachtgarm of Negator is the new vocalist. A week prior it had also been announced that Dominator returned to the band. On 27 July 2011, Zornheym was revealed to be the band's new bassist, completing the lineup.

In late 2012, Dark Funeral parted ways with Nachtgarm, who returned to Negator. Zornheym exited the band in 2014.

=== Where Shadows Forever Reign ===
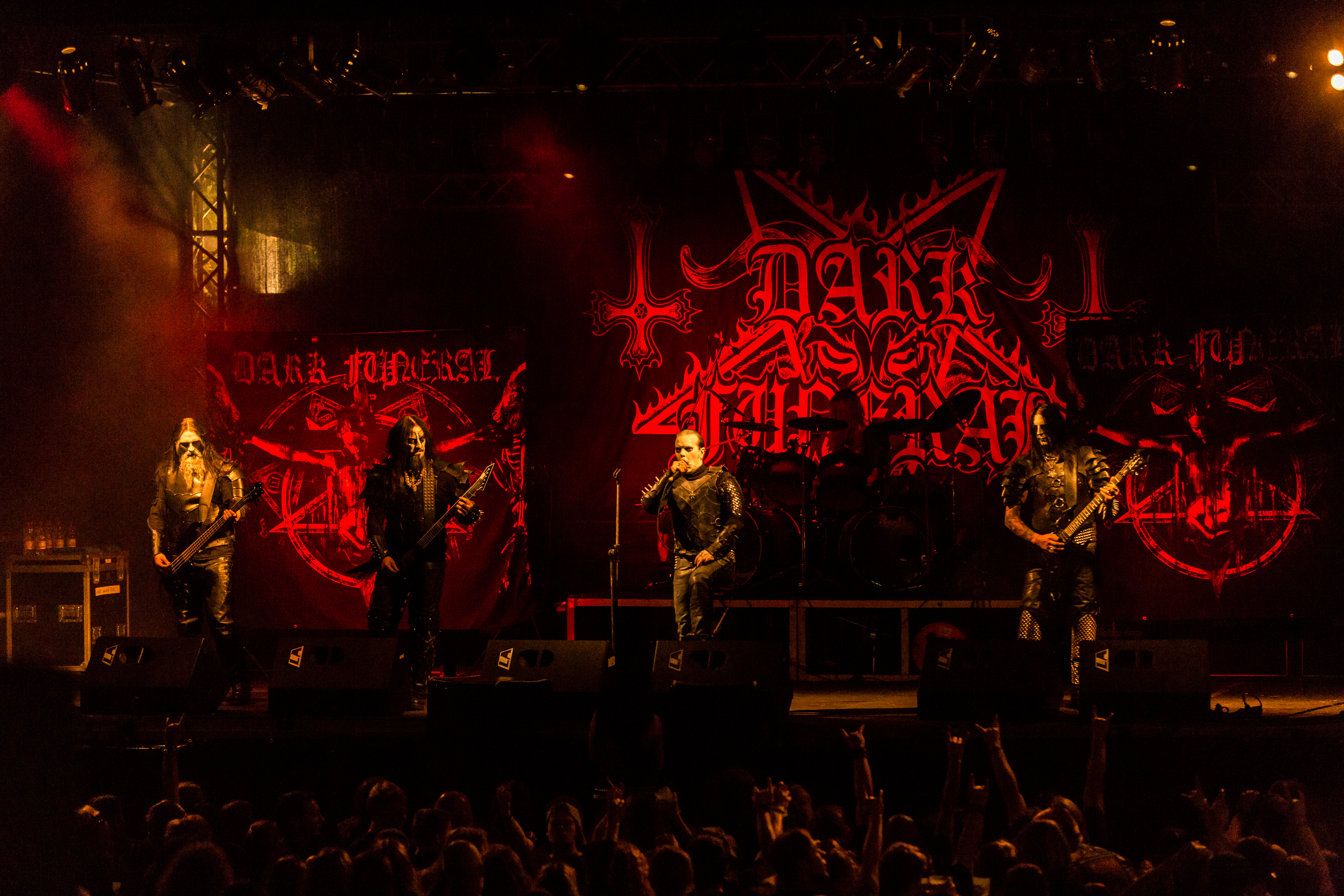
Dark Funeral performing at Rock unter den Eichen in Germany, 2017

On 16 December 2014, Dark Funeral released a new track and music video entitled "Nail Them to the Cross". The video revealed a new vocalist, Heljarmadr (Gra, Domgård, Cursed 13) and bassist Natt (Angrepp, Withershin) to the group's ranks, although by the time the band started recording in February 2016 for their sixth album Where Shadows Forever Reign, which was released on 3 June by Century Media, Natt was no longer in the group, having Lord Ahriman record the bass for the album. In 2016, Gustaf Hielm, who played session bass on Attera Totus Sanctus, enrolled again as a session bass player, this time for concerts. In November 2017, it was announced that drummer Dominator has left the band and was replaced by Jalomaah.

=== We Are the Apocalypse ===
In May 2021, the band reported they were entering the studio to record their seventh studio album. The band completed recording the album in September 2021. In a Facebook post from November 2021, the band stated their seventh studio album will be entitled We Are the Apocalypse and is scheduled to be released on 18 March 2022. Dark Funeral supported Cannibal Corpse on their spring tour of Europe in early 2023 along with Ingested. The band played Maryland Deathfest in 2025.

== Musical style ==
Their lyrical themes have traditionally pertained to Satanism and anti-Christianity. Certain past and present members including Blackmoon, Ahriman, Caligula, and Chaq Mol have each declared an affinity for Satanism, with Ahriman and Caligula notably being practitioners of LaVeyan Satanism. In their earlier years, their lyrical themes usually revolved specifically around depictions of Hell and Satan. After Emperor Magus Caligula joined the band, their lyrics came to focus more on blasphemy and anti-Christian rhetoric, although there have been several exceptions to this. Other themes explored in the music include the underworld, eschatology, hatred, misanthropy, theistic Satanism, and black magic.

== Band members ==
Current

- Lord Ahriman (Mikael Svanberg) – guitars (1993–present)
- Chaq Mol (Bo Anders Nymark) – guitars (2003–present)
- Heljarmadr (Andreas Vingbäck) – vocals (2014–present)
- Adra-Melek (Fredrik Isaksson) – bass (2017–present)
- Jalomaah (Janne Jesper Jalomaa) – drums (2017–present)
Dark Funeral at Rock unter den Eichen 2017, Germany

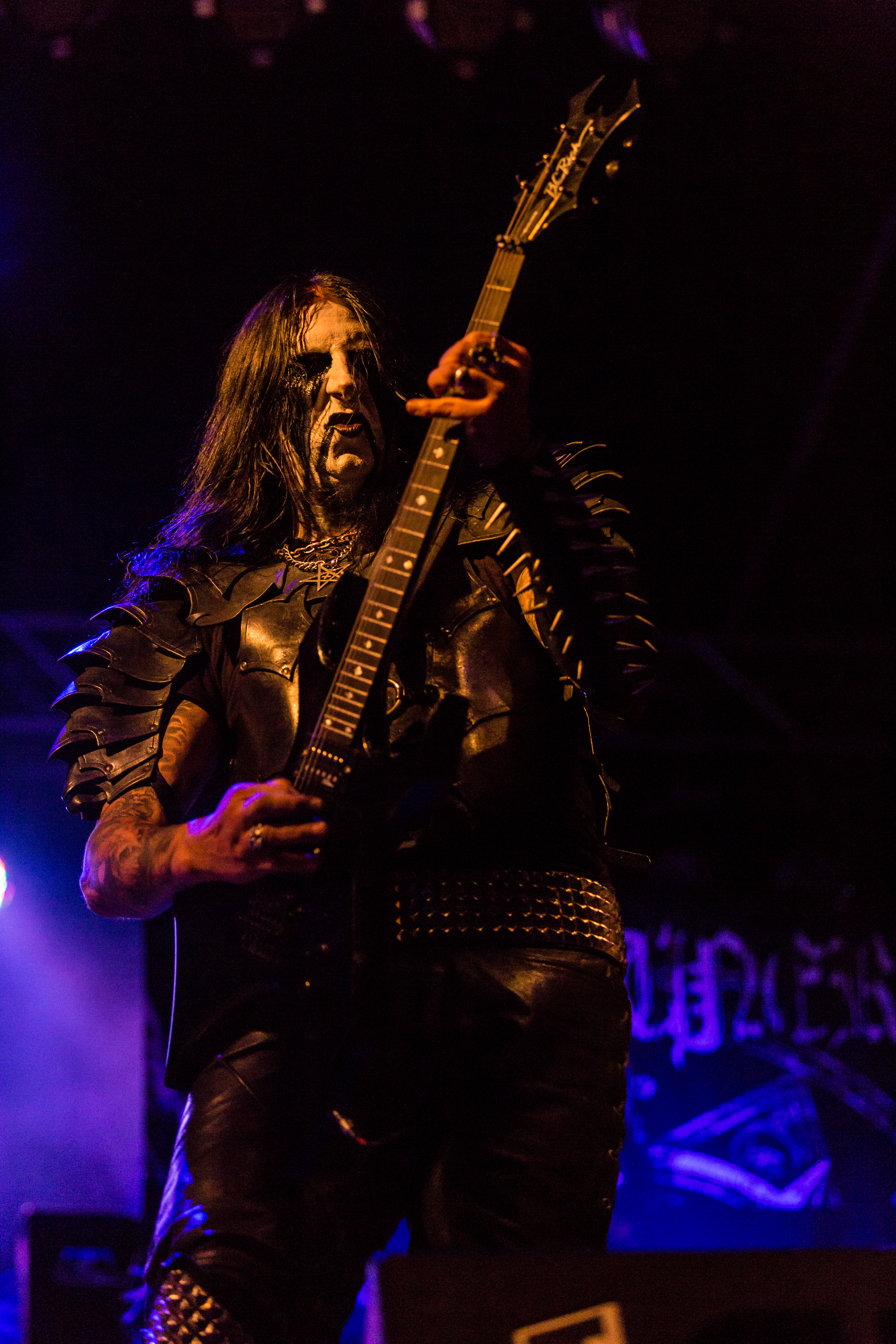
Lord Ahriman

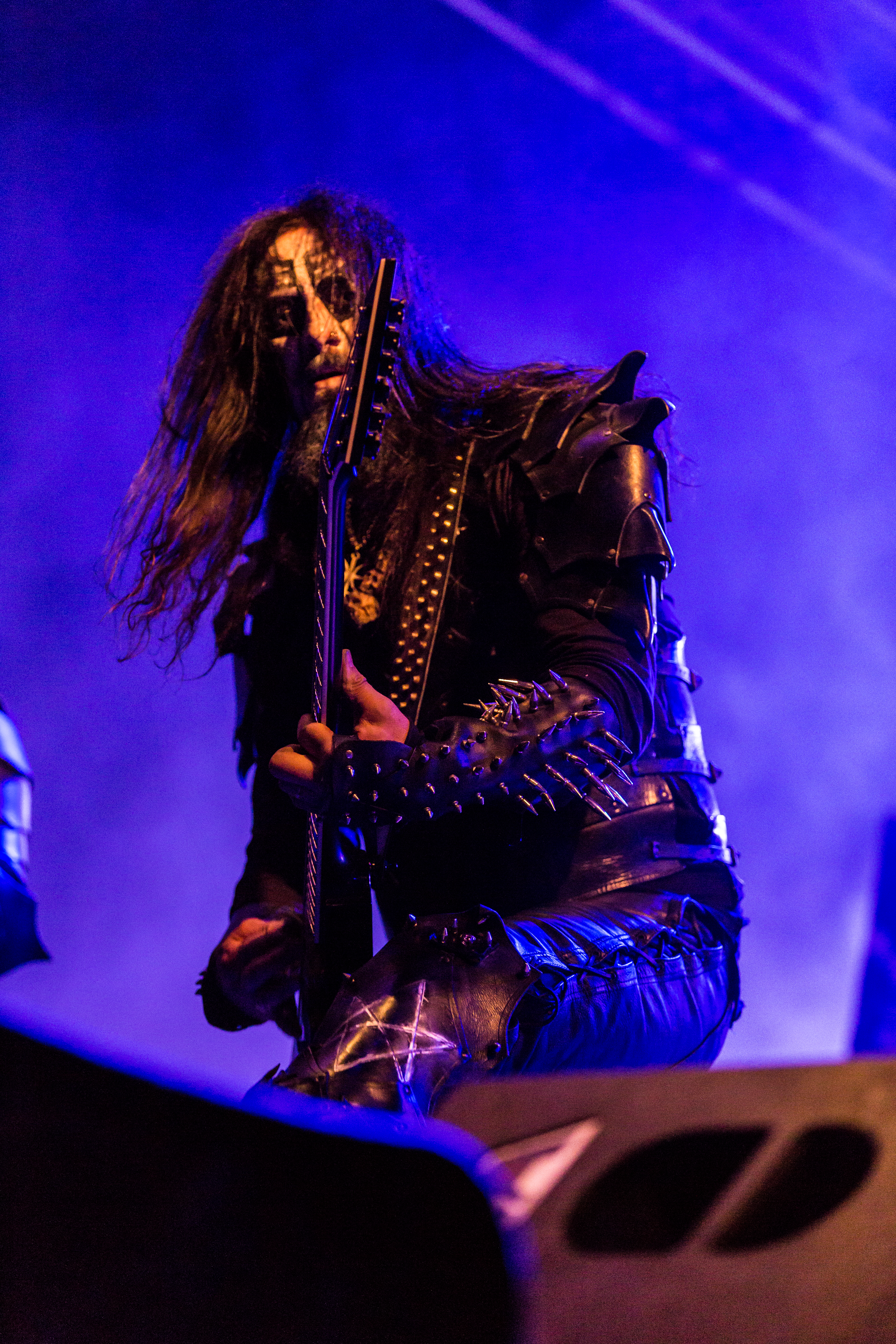
Chaq Mol

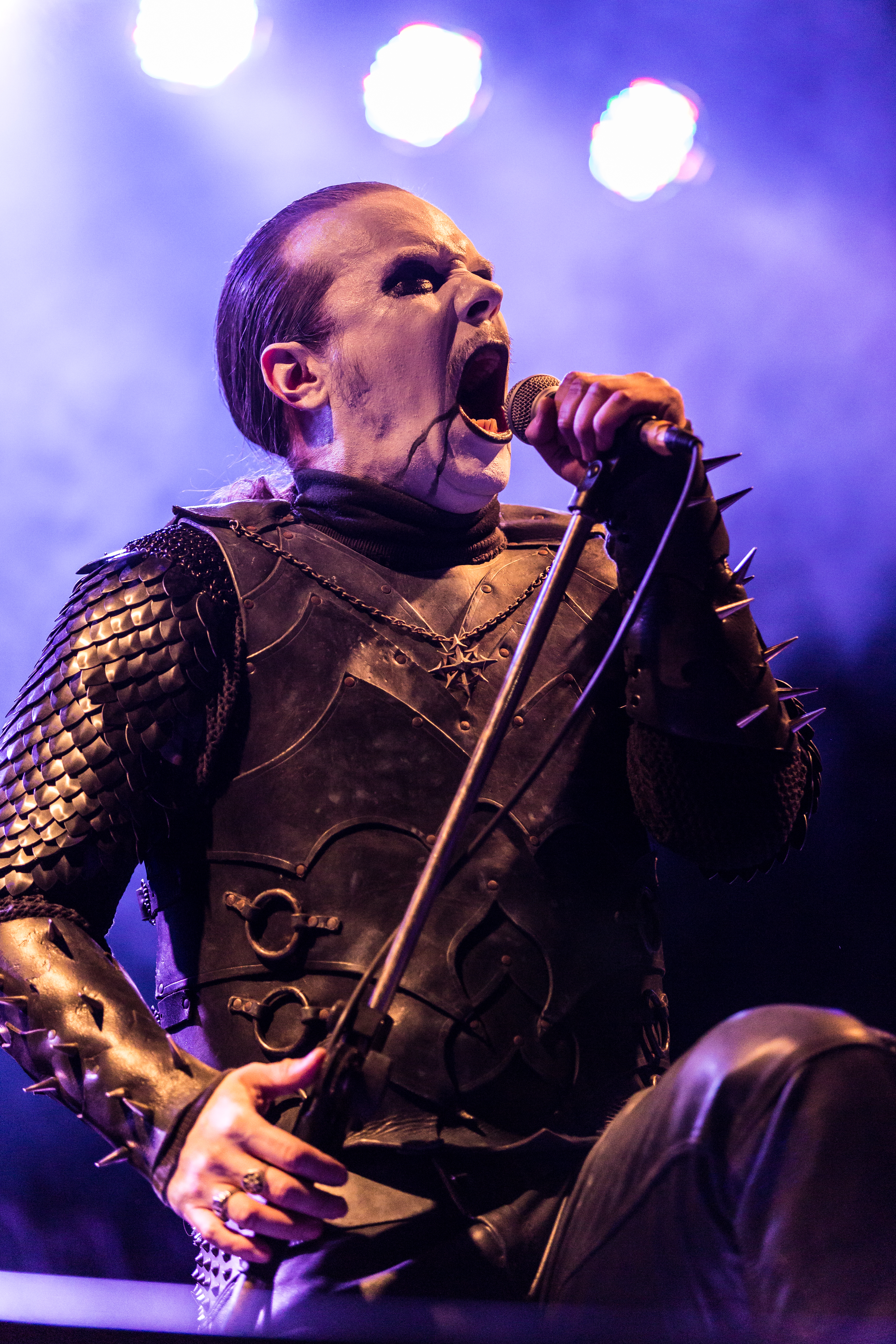
Heljarmadr

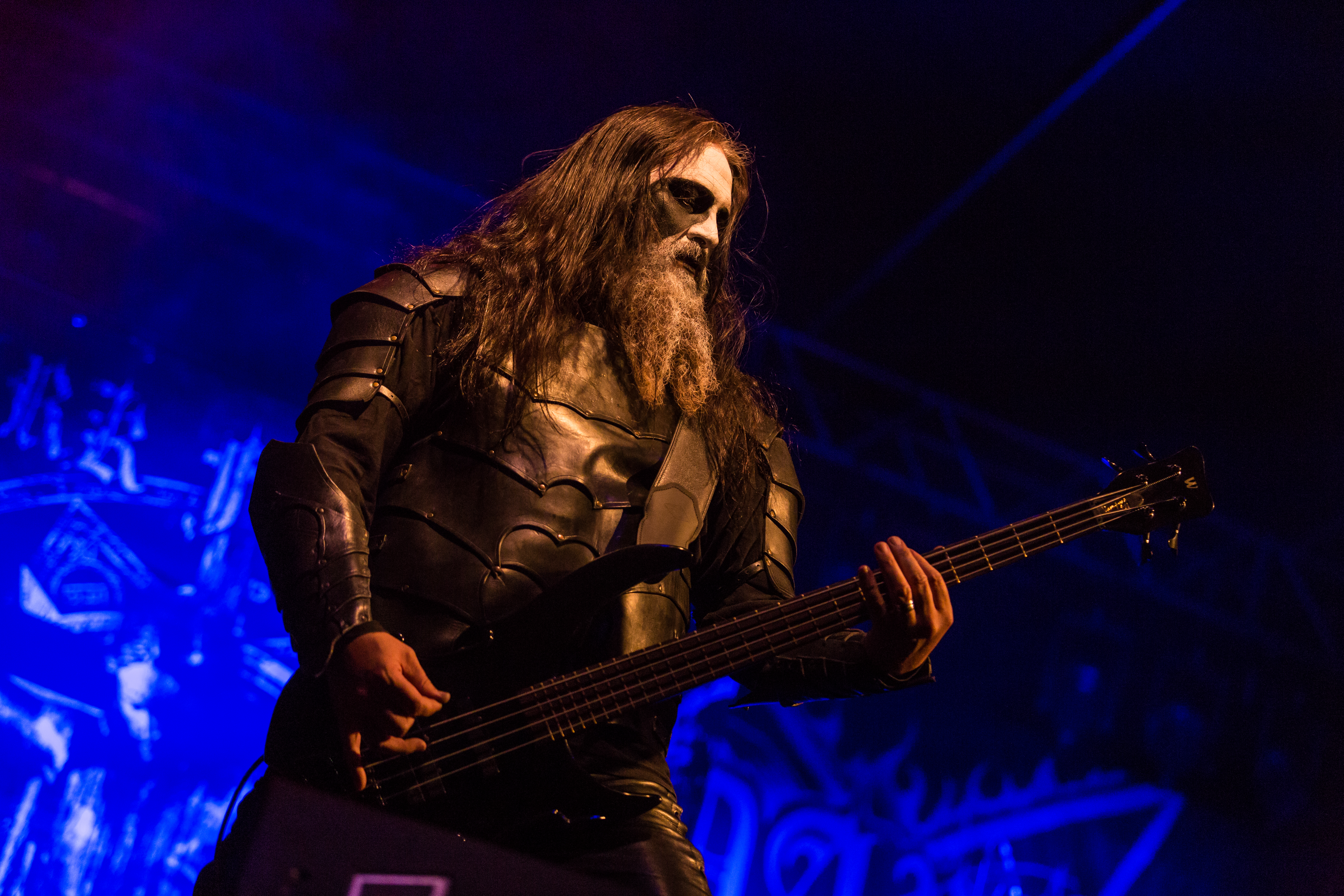
Adra-Melek

== Discography ==
=== Studio albums ===
- The Secrets of the Black Arts (1996)
- Vobiscum Satanas (1998)
- Diabolis Interium (2001)
- Attera Totus Sanctus (2005)
- Angelus Exuro pro Eternus (2009)
- Where Shadows Forever Reign (2016)
- We Are the Apocalypse (2022)

=== Live albums ===
- De Profundis Clamavi Ad Te Domine (2004)
- A Beast to Praise (2026)

=== Extended plays ===
- Dark Funeral (1994)
- Teach Children to Worship Satan (2000)
- In the Sign… (2000)
- Nail Them to the Cross (2015)

=== Video albums ===
- Attera Orbis Terrarum - Part I (2007)
- Attera Orbis Terrarum - Part II (2008)
