= Attera Totus Sanctus =

Studio album by Dark Funeral
- Released: 24 October 2005
- Recorded: 23 May – 15 July 2005; 8–19 August 2005
- Genre: Black metal
- Length: 42:58
- Language: English, Latin
- Label: Regain (Europe); Candlelight (North America)
- Producer: Daniel Bergstrand, Örjan Örnkloo

Dark Funeral chronology
De Profundis Clamavi Ad Te Domine (2004)	Attera Totus Sanctus (2005)	Angelus Exuro pro Eternus (2009)

Professional ratings
Review scores
Source	Rating
Allmusic	3/5 stars
Blabbermouth.net	7/10 stars
Chronicles of Chaos	8.5/10 stars

Attera Totus Sanctus (intended Latin translation of "Destroy All the Holy") is the fourth studio album by Swedish black metal band Dark Funeral. It was released on 24 October 2005 in Europe through Regain Records, and on 29 November 2005 in the United States through Candlelight Records USA. The title was chosen to convey the band's vehement anti–right-hand path stance. Attera Totus Sanctus is the first album to feature guitarist Chaq Mol and the last to feature drummer Matte Modin. It also features session bassist Gustaf Hielm.

== Attera Orbis Terrarum ==
Attera Orbis Terrarum is the name of the series of tours by Dark Funeral in promotion of Attera Totus Sanctus. Several shows as well as recordings from other eras of Dark Funeral's history were accounted on the following live DVDs:

- Attera Orbis Terrarum – Part I – mainly consisted of shows performed in Europe, 2005–2006
- Attera Orbis Terrarum – Part II – mainly consisted of shows performed in South America, October 2006

== Track listing ==
All lyrics are written by Emperor Magus Caligula.

No.	Title	Music	Length
1.	"King Antichrist"	Lord Ahriman	4:39
2.	"666 Voices Inside"	Lord Ahriman, Chaq Mol	4:38
3.	"Attera Totus Sanctus"	Lord Ahriman	5:37
4.	"Godhate"	Lord Ahriman, Chaq Mol	5:06
5.	"Atrum Regina"	Lord Ahriman	5:33
6.	"Angel Flesh Impaled"	Lord Ahriman	5:53
7.	"Feed on the Mortals"	Lord Ahriman, Chaq Mol	5:41
8.	"Final Ritual"	Lord Ahriman	5:44
9.	"Atrum Regina" (Japanese bonus track, instrumental version)	Lord Ahriman	5:33
10.	"Open the Gates" (Japanese bonus track, 2005 version)		4:25
Total length:			42:58

2013 Reissue Bonus Tracks
No.	Title	Length
11.	"The Arrival of Satan's Empire" (Live in South America)	3:35
12.	"An Apprentice of Satan" (Live in South America)	5:30
13.	"The Dawn No More Rises" (Live in South America)	3:27
14.	"The Secrets of the Black Arts" (Live in South America)	3:34
15.	"Vobiscum Satanas" (Live in South America)	4:19
16.	"Ineffable King of Darkness" (Live in South America)	2:54
Total length:		76:02

== Personnel ==
=== Dark Funeral ===
- Lord Ahriman – lead guitar
- Emperor Magus Caligula – vocals
- Matte Modin – drums
- Chaq Mol – rhythm guitar

Additional Personnel

- Gustaf Hielm – bass

=== Production ===
- Daniel Bergstrand – mixing
- Örjan Örnkloo – mixing
- Tomas Eberger – mastering
- Daniel "Morbid" Valeriani – cover design and artwork, layout
- Erik Sjolander – photography

== Charts ==
Chart (2005)	Peak position
Swedish Albums Chart	35
