= Defleshed =

Swedish death/thrash metal band

- Origin: Uppsala, Sweden
- Genres: Thrash metal; death metal
- Years active: 1991–2005; 2021–present
- Label: Regain Records
- Members: Gustaf Jorde; Lars Löfven; Matte Modin

Defleshed is a Swedish death/thrash metal band. Guitarist Lars Löfven, formerly of Convulsion and Inanimate, formed the group. Ex-Crematorium bassist Gustaf Jorde joined shortly after recording a demo. In 1995, drummer Matte Modin joined the band. They have released several albums on high-profile metal labels. In November 2005, it was announced that Defleshed had officially split-up. The band had a side project named Vargavinter.

In January 2021, Defleshed announced they had reformed and were working on new material. In July 2022, the band announced they had signed with Metal Blade Records and would release their new album, Grind Over Matter, on October 28, which would be the band's first album in 17 years.

== Members ==
=== Current members ===
- Gustaf Jorde – vocals, bass (Raubtier)
- Lars Löfven – guitars
- Matte Modin – drums, (Raised Fist, ex-Dark Funeral)

=== Former members ===
- Oskar Karlsson – drums
- Kristoffer Griedl – guitar
- Robin Dohlk – vocals (on Defleshed demo)
- Johan Hedman – vocals (on Abrah Kadavrah demo)

== Discography ==
=== Albums ===
- Abrah Kadavrah (1996)
- Under the Blade (Metal Blade Records, 1997)
- Fast Forward (Pavement Music, 1999)
- Royal Straight Flesh (Regain Records, 2002)
- Reclaim the Beat (Candlelight Records, 2005)
- Grind Over Matter (Metal Blade Records, 2022)

=== EPs ===
- Ma Belle Scalpelle (1994)
- Death... The High Cost of Living (Crash Records, 2000)

=== Demos ===
- Defleshed (1992)
- Abrah Kadavrah (demo) (1992)
