= Vobiscum Satanas =

Studio album by Dark Funeral
- Released: 27 April 1998
- Recorded: 9–21 January 1997
- Studio: The Abyss Studios
- Genre: Black metal
- Length: 35:06
- Language: English, Latin
- Label: No Fashion
- Producer: Dark Funeral, Peter Tägtgren

Dark Funeral chronology
The Secrets of the Black Arts (1996)	Vobiscum Satanas (1998)	Diabolis Interium (2001)

Professional ratings
Review scores
Source	Rating
About.com	3.5/5 stars
AllMusic	3/5 stars
Chronicles of Chaos	8/10
Collector's Guide to Heavy Metal	8/10
Rock Hard	8.0/10

Vobiscum Satanas (Latin for "May Satan Be with You") is the second studio album by Swedish black metal band Dark Funeral. Vobiscum Satanas is the first album to feature longtime vocalist and lyricist Emperor Magus Caligula, and the only one to feature guitarist Typhos and drummer Alzazmon. Only guitarist Lord Ahriman returns for this album from the lineup that appeared on the previous album.

The album was remastered and reissued on CD by Regain Records in 2007. The reissue was limited to 3,000 copies and also featured four bonus tracks recorded live at Hultsfreds Festival in 1998. The album was remastered in May 2007 by Peter In de Betou at Tailor Maid Productions.

== Track listing ==
All lyrics are written by Emperor Magus Caligula.

No.	Title	Music	Length
1.	"Ravenna Strigoi Mortii"	Lord Ahriman	4:27
2.	"Enriched by Evil"	Lord Ahriman, Typhos	4:43
3.	"Thy Legions Come"	Lord Ahriman	4:13
4.	"Evil Prevail"	Lord Ahriman, Typhos	4:28
5.	"Slava Satan"	Lord Ahriman	3:59
6.	"The Black Winged Horde"	Lord Ahriman, Typhos	4:38
7.	"Vobiscum Satanas"	Lord Ahriman	5:00
8.	"Ineffable King of Darkness"	Lord Ahriman, Typhos	3:38
Total length:			35:06

2013 reissue bonus tracks
No.	Title	Music	Length
9.	"Enriched by Evil" (live 1998)	Lord Ahriman, Typhos	4:41
10.	"Thy Legions Come" (live 1998)	Lord Ahriman	4:15
11.	"Vobiscum Satanas" (live 1998)	Lord Ahriman	5:01
12.	"Ineffable King of Darkness" (live 1998)	Lord Ahriman, Typhos	3:28
Total length:			52:43

== Personnel ==
- Emperor Magus Caligula – vocals, bass guitar
- Lord Ahriman – guitar
- Typhos – guitar
- Alzazmon – drums
- Peter Tägtgren – producer, engineer, mixing
