= Emperor Magus Caligula =

Swedish extreme metal musician

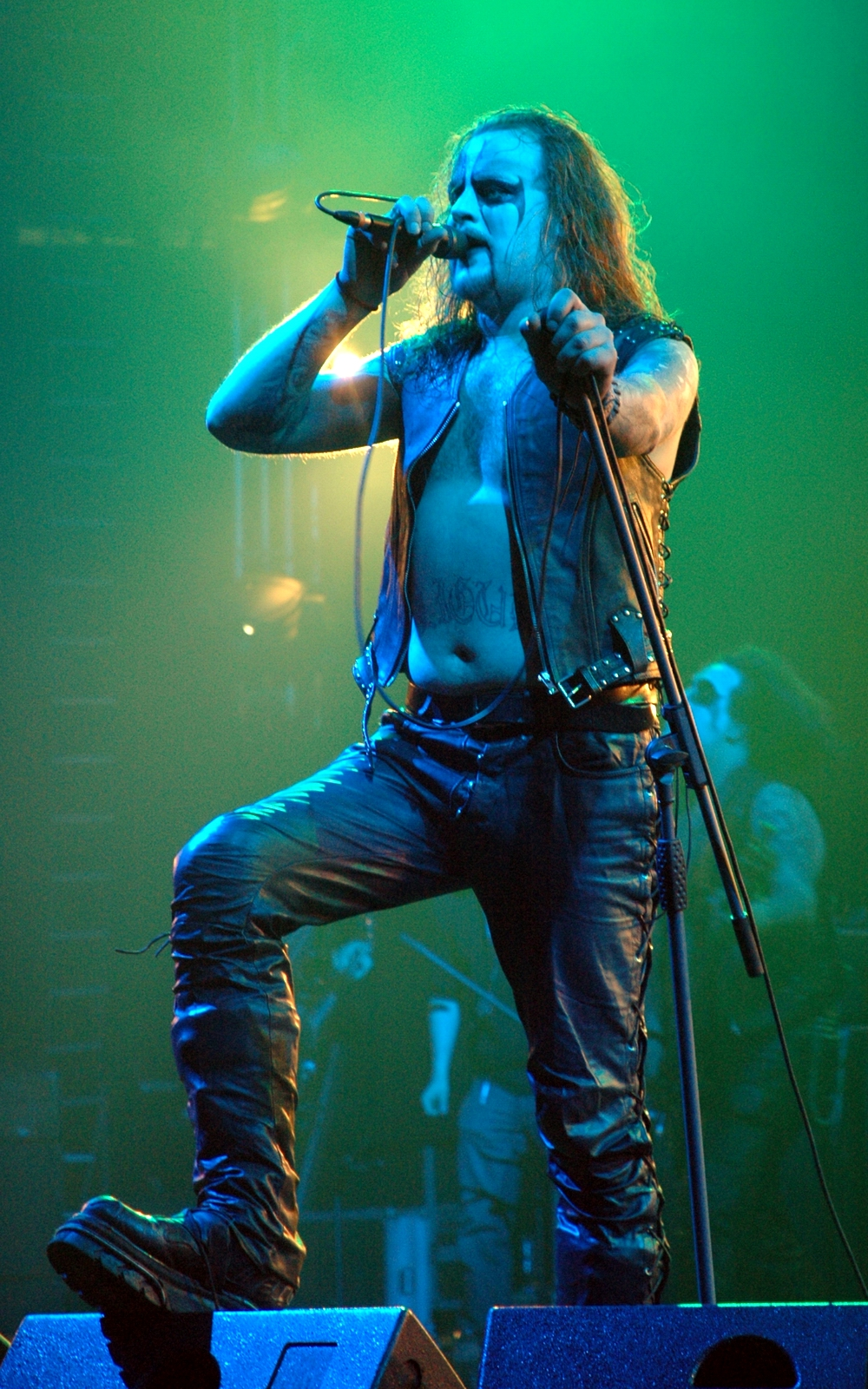
- Caligula in 2005

Background information
- Also known as: Emperor Magus Caligula; Masse Broberg
- Born: Magnus Carl Broberg; 25 May 1973 (age 52); Ludvika, Sweden
- Genres: Black metal, death metal
- Occupations: Lyricist, musician
- Instruments: Vocals, bass
- Years active: 1989–present

Emperor Magus Caligula (born Magnus Carl "Masse" Broberg, 23 May 1973) is a Swedish extreme metal musician best known as the former vocalist, bassist and lyricist of Swedish black metal band Dark Funeral, performing for the band between 1995 and 2010. He has also been the vocalist of death metal bands Demonoid, replacing Christofer Johnsson, and Sanctification. He was the original vocalist for Hypocrisy and has featured in other extreme metal bands including Dominion-Caligula (with former Dark Funeral guitarist Dominion) and God Among Insects. He has also performed backing vocals for the Swedish black metal band Sportlov.

In July 2011, Witchery announced Caligula was joining the band, replacing Legion. In 2016, he departed Witchery due to hearing issues.

== Early life ==
Broberg was born in Ludvika.

== Beliefs ==
Caligula is a practitioner of LaVeyan Satanism, and while he has on one hand distanced himself from National Socialist black metal, like many other black metal musicians, he has generally assumed an apolitical stance, although he expressed disdain for former Islamic terrorist leader Osama bin Laden, with his audience when playing live. He has also denounced Roman Catholic priests due to widespread child molestation allegations.

== Gazziero murder controversy ==
Caligula was quoted as being "somewhat impressed" by the premeditated murder of Fr. Faustino Gazziero, a Catholic priest, by Dark Funeral fan Rodrigo Orias at the Metropolitan Cathedral in Santiago, Chile, further stating that "He deserves some credit. You're not supposed to say that, but I don't care." Although he suggested the possibility that "the music triggered him somehow," he denied Dark Funeral's music being the direct cause of Orias' murder of Gazziero.

Caligula also recalled having met Orias at a Dark Funeral concert in 2003, where he burnt a cross on Orias' arm at his request with a Cuban cigar.

== Film ==
Caligula made an appearance in the Swedish zombie film Die Zombiejäger, playing a humorous part of a necrophile. Dark Funeral also provided two songs for the film, Godhate, which is played during the film's opening credits and Thus I Have Spoken, which is played during a fight scene.

== Discography ==
=== Dark Funeral ===
==== Full-lengths ====
- Vobiscum Satanas (1998)
- Diabolis Interium (2001)
- Attera Totus Sanctus (2005)
- Angelus Exuro pro Eternus (2009)

==== EPs ====
- Teach Children to Worship Satan (2000)

==== Live ====
- De Profundis Clamavi Ad Te Domine (2004)

==== Videos ====
- Attera Orbis Terrarum - Part I (2007)
- Attera Orbis Terrarum - Part II (2008)

=== Sanctification ===
- Black Reign

=== God Among Insects ===
==== Full-lengths ====
- World Wide Death (2004)
- Zombienomicon (2006)

=== Dominion Caligula ===
==== Full-lengths ====
- A New Era Rises (2000)

=== Hypocrisy ===
==== Full-lengths ====
- Penetralia (1992)
- Osculum Obscenum (1993)

==== EPs ====
- Pleasure of Molestation (1993)

=== The Project Hate ===
==== Full-lengths ====
- Hate, Dominate, Congregate, Eliminate
