= No Fashion Records =

Swedish record label

No Fashion Records was a Swedish record label (a sublabel of MNW Music) which focused on extreme metal. It was located in Stockholm and was active from 1992 to 2004. It was founded by the Swedish zine editor Tomas Nyqvist.

== Bands ==
- A Canorous Quintet
- Ablaze My Sorrow
- Dark Funeral
- Decameron
- Dissection
- Insania
- Katatonia
- Lord Belial
- Marduk
- Merciless
- Ophthalamia
- The Storyteller
- Unanimated
- Wolf

== See also ==
- List of record labels
