= The Abyss (recording studio) =

Recording studio in Pärlby, Sweden

Coordinates: 60°16′54″N 15°00′49″E

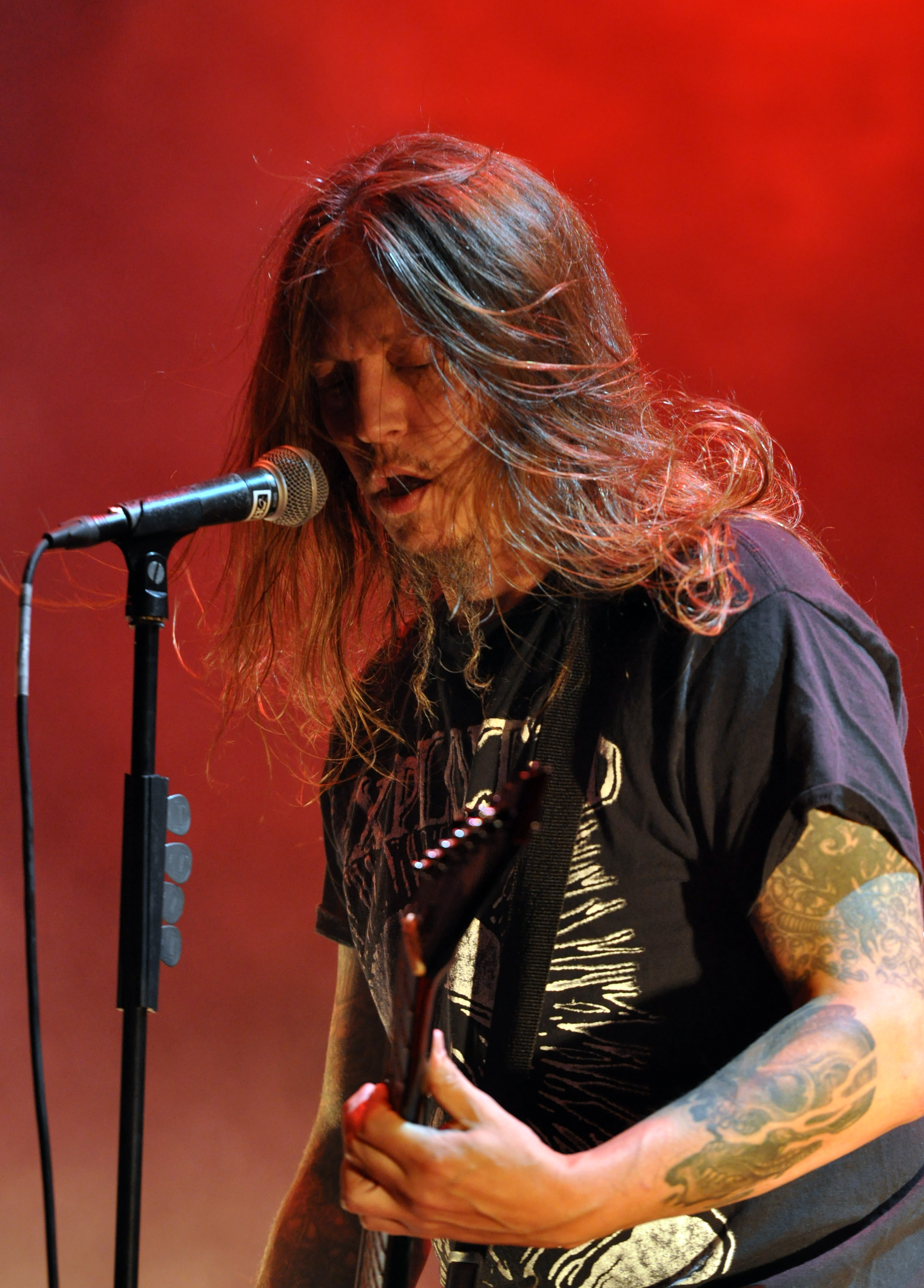
Peter Tägtgren in 2013

The Abyss is a recording studio in Pärlby outside Ludvika, Sweden. It is owned and operated by Peter Tägtgren.

== Recordings ==
The following list consists of releases recorded, produced or mixed by Peter Tägtgren at The Abyss studios (meaning Studio A run by Peter himself)

Band	Releases	Year	Note/credit
The Abyss	The Other Side	1995	
Naglfar	Vittra	1995	
Death Organ	9 to 5	1995	
Dark Funeral	The Secrets of the Black Arts	1996	
Fleshcrawl	Bloodsoul	1996	
Hypocrisy	Abducted	1996	
The Abyss	Summon the Beast	1996	
Amon Amarth	Sorrow Throughout the Nine Worlds	1996	
Setherial	Nord	1996	
Marduk	Heaven Shall Burn... When We Are Gathered	1996	
Marduk	Glorification	1996	
Pain	Pain	1997	
Sorhin	I Det Glimrande Mörkrets Djup	1997	
Dimmu Borgir	Enthrone Darkness Triumphant	1997	
Allegiance	Blodörnsoffer	1997	
Marduk	Live in Germania	1997	
Fleshcrawl	Bloodred Massacre	1997	
Hypocrisy	The Final Chapter	1997	
Abruptum	Vi Sonus Veris Nigrae Malitiaes	1997	
Therion	A'arab Zaraq - Lucid Dreaming	1997	
Dark Funeral	Vobiscum Satanas	1998	
Amon Amarth	Once Sent from the Golden Hall	1998	
Dimmu Borgir	Godless Savage Garden	1998	
Marduk	Nightwing	1998	
Dispatched	Promised Land	1998	
Dawn	Slaughtersun (Crown of the Triarchy)	1998	
Love Like Blood	Snakekiller	1998	
Love Like Blood	The Love Like Blood E.P.	1998	
Enslaved	Blodhemn	1998	
Raise Hell	Holy Target	1998	
Thyrfing	Valdr Galga	1999	
Hypocrisy	Hypocrisy	1999	
Immortal	At the Heart of Winter	1999	
Enthroned	The Apocalypse Maniphesto	1999	
Dimmu Borgir	Spiritual Black Dimensions	1999	
Allegiance	Vrede	1999	
Triumphator	Wings of Antichrist	1999	
Marduk	Panzer Division Marduk	1999	
Pain	Rebirth	1999	
Amon Amarth	The Avenger	1999	
Borknagar	Quintessence	2000	
Children of Bodom	Follow the Reaper	2000	
Dark Funeral	Teach Children to Worship Satan	2000	
Destruction	All Hell Breaks Loose	2000	
Dispatched	Motherwar	2000	
Dark Funeral	In the Sign...	2000	
Old Man's Child	Revelation 666 - The Curse of Damnation	2000	
Hypocrisy	Into the Abyss	2000	
Immortal	Damned in Black	2000	
Rotting Christ	Khronos	2000	
Neglected Fields	Mephisto Lettonica	2000	
Enslaved	Mardraum - Beyond the Within	2000	
Gardenian	Sindustries	2000	
Susperia	Predominance	2001	
Marduk	La Grande Danse Macabre	2001	
Amon Amarth	The Crusher	2001	
Destruction	The Antichrist	2001	
Dark Funeral	Diabolis Interium	2001	
Immortal	Sons of Northern Darkness	2002	
Hypocrisy	Catch 22	2002	
Susperia	Vindication	2002	
Pain	Nothing Remains the Same	2002	
Shining	Angst, självdestruktivitetens emissarie	2002	
Marduk	World Funeral	2003	
Grimfist	Ghouls of Grandeur	2003	
Forgotten Tomb	Springtime Depression	2003	
Hypocrisy	The Arrival	2004	
Maryslim	Split Vision	2004	
Grave	Fiendish Regression	2004	
Pain	Dancing with the Dead	2005	
Destruction	Inventor of Evil	2005	
Hypocrisy	Virus	2005	
Dimmu Borgir	Stormblåst MMV	2005	
Celtic Frost	Monotheist	2006)	co-producing and mixing at Horus Sound studio
Grave	As Rapture Comes	2006	
Noctiferia	Slovenska Morbida	2006	
To/Die/For	Wounds Wide Open	2006	mixing
I	Between Two Worlds	2006	mixing
Pain	Psalms of Extinction	2007	
Maryslim	A Perfect Mess	2007	
Dogpound	III	2007	producing, recording, mixing
Devian	Ninewinged Serpent	2007	
Children of Bodom	Blooddrunk	2008	producing and recording vocals in Petrax studio
Hypocrisy	Catch 22 V2.0.08	2008	
Pain	Cynic Paradise	2008	
Sanctification	Black Reign	2008	
Devian	God to the Illfated	2008	
Sabaton	The Art of War	2008	
Tarja	The Seer EP	2008	remixing of 'Lost Northern Star'
Immortal	All Shall Fall	2009	
Hypocrisy	A Taste of Extreme Divinity	2009	
Dark Funeral	Angelus Exuro pro Eternus	2009	
Sabaton	Coat Of Arms	2010	
Overkill	Ironbound	2010	mixing
Noctiferia	Death Culture	2010	mixing
Immortal	The Seventh Date of Blashyrkh	2010	mixing
Abigail Williams	In the Absence of Light	2011	
Belphegor	Blood Magick Necromance	2011	
Legion of the Damned	Descent into Chaos	2011	
Kampfar	Mare	2011	
The Unguided	Nightmareland (EP)	2011	
Loudblast	Frozen Moments Between Life And Death	2011	
Septic Flesh	The Great Mass	2011	producing and mixing
Pain	You Only Live Twice	2011	
Tornado	Amsterdamn, Hellsinki	2011	
Raubtier	Från Norrland till Helvetets Port	2012	
Heidevolk	Batavi	2012	
Carnalation	Deathmask	2012	
Essence	Last Night Of Solace	2012	
Sabaton	Carolus Rex	2012	
Hypocrisy	End of Disclosure	2013	
Amorphis	Circle	2013	producing and recording in Petrax, mixing in Abyss
Children Of Bodom	Halo of Blood	2013	producing vocals
Infernaeon	The Cancer Within	2013	mixing
Kampfar	Djevelmakt	2014	mixing
Sabaton	Heroes	2014	producing, recording, mixing
Carach Angren	This is No Fairytale	2015	mixing
Civil War	Gods and Generals	2015	
Lindemann (band)	Skills in Pills	2015	recording, mixing of 3 songs
Dynazty	Titanic Mass	2016	producing, recording, mixing
Sabaton	The Last Stand	2016	producing, recording, mixing
Pain	Coming Home	2016	producing, recording, mixing
Carach Angren	Dance and Laugh Amongst the Rotten	2017	producing, recording, mixing
Immortal	Northern Chaos Gods	2018	bass, producing, recording, mixing
Dynazty	Firesign	2018	mixing
Possessed	Revelations of Oblivion	2019	mixing
Incardine	Seeds of Doom	2019	mixing
Lindemann (band)	F & M	2019	
Hypocrisy	Worship	2021	producing and mixing
Joe Lynn Turner	Belly of the Beast	2022	guitars, bass, programming, producing, recording, mixing
