= 1996 in heavy metal music =

This is a timeline documenting the events of heavy metal music in the year 1996.

== Newly formed bands ==
- 3 Doors Down
- Ajattara
- Alabama Thunderpussy
- Alien Ant Farm
- Averse Sefira
- Breed 77
- Cattle Decapitation
- Combatwoundedveteran
- Control Denied
- The Crest
- Daylight Dies
- Decapitated
- Diabolic
- Dornenreich
- Drowning Pool
- Ebony Tears
- Fall of the Leafe
- Flaw (as F.law)
- Gardenian
- Goatsnake
- God Forbid
- Gojira
- The Haunted
- Heaven Shall Burn
- Hibria
- Into Eternity
- Iron Savior
- Kiss It Goodbye
- Kittie
- Linkin Park (as Xero)
- Manticora
- Maudlin of the Well
- MD.45
- Mudvayne
- Nargaroth
- Narnia
- Nashville Pussy
- Nightwish
- Nocturnal Breed
- Norther
- Omnium Gatherum
- Orden Ogan
- Pain
- Penumbra
- Prayer for Cleansing
- Queens of the Stone Age
- Racetraitor
- Saliva
- Samsas Traum
- Sculptured
- Shadows of Steel
- Shining
- The Sins of Thy Beloved
- Soulburn
- Spineshank
- Spirit Caravan
- Stam1na
- Training for Utopia
- Trans-Siberian Orchestra
- Tvangeste
- Two
- Ultraspank
- uneXpect
- The Union Underground
- Viikate
- Within Temptation
- Yob

== Albums ==
- 24-7 Spyz - 6 (alternate version released in America as Heavy Metal Soul by the Pound)
- 24-7 Spyz - Heavy Metal Soul by the Pound (alternate version released in Europe as 6)
- Anal Cunt - 40 More Reasons To Hate Us
- Accept - Predator
- Acid Bath - Paegan Terrorism Tactics
- Alice in Chains - Unplugged (live)
- Altar - Ego Art
- Amon Amarth - Sorrow Throughout the Nine Worlds (EP)
- Amorphis - Elegy
- Anathema – Eternity
- Angelcorpse - Hammer of Gods
- Angra - Holy Land
- Angra - Freedom Call (EP)
- Antidote - Mind Alive
- Anvil (band) – Plugged in Permanent
- Apocalyptica - Plays Metallica by Four Cellos
- Arch Enemy - Black Earth
- Arcturus - Aspera Hiems Symfonia
- Asphyx - God Cries
- Asphyx - Embrace the Death (recorded in 1990)
- Ayreon - Actual Fantasy
- Bathory - Blood on Ice
- Behemoth - Grom
- Biohazard - Mata Leão
- Borknagar - Borknagar
- Bruce Dickinson - Skunkworks
- Brutality - In Mourning
- Brutal Truth - Kill Trend Suicide
- Burzum - Filosofem
- Cannibal Corpse - Vile
- Cathedral - Supernatural Birth Machine
- Civil Defiance - The Fishers For Souls
- Converge - Petitioning the Empty Sky
- Corrosion of Conformity - Wiseblood
- Count Raven - Messiah of Confusion
- Cradle of Filth - V Empire or Dark Faerytales in Phallustein (EP)
- Cradle of Filth - Dusk... and Her Embrace
- Crowbar - Broken Glass
- Cryptopsy - None So Vile
- The Cult – High Octane Cult
- Danzig – Danzig 5: Blackacidevil
- Dark Funeral - The Secrets of the Black Arts
- Dawn - Sorgh på Svarte Vingar Fløgh
- Deep Purple - Purpendicular
- Def Leppard - Slang
- Desultory - Swallow the Snake
- Deeds Of Flesh - Trading Pieces
- DGeneration – No Lunch
- Dimmu Borgir - Stormblåst
- Dio - Angry Machines
- Downset. - Do We Speak a Dead Language?
- Drain STH – Horror Wrestling
- Dying Fetus - Purification Through Violence
- Earth Crisis - Gomorrah's Season Ends
- Edge of Sanity - Crimson
- Eyehategod - Dopesick
- Far - Tin Cans with Strings to You
- FireHouse – Good Acoustics
- Forbidden - Green
- Freak Kitchen - Spanking Hour
- Fu Manchu - In Search of...
- Godflesh - Songs of Love and Hate
- Gorefest - Soul Survivor
- Gorgoroth - Antichrist
- Grave - Hating Life
- Grinspoon - Licker Bottle Cozy (EP)
- Helloween - The Time of the Oath
- Hypocrisy - Abducted
- Hypocrisy - Maximum Abduction (EP)
- Immolation - Here in After
- In Flames - The Jester Race
- Iced Earth - The Dark Saga
- Integrity – Humanity is the Devil
- King Diamond - The Graveyard
- Kataklysm - Temple of Knowledge
- Katatonia - Brave Murder Day
- Khafra - Generaciones
- Korn - Life Is Peachy
- Korpse - Revirgin
- Kvist - For Kunsten Maa Vi Evig Vike
- L.A. Guns – American Hardcore
- Tony MacAlpine - Violent Machine
- Madball - Demonstrating My Style
- Manowar - Louder Than Hell
- Marduk - Heaven Shall Burn... When We Are Gathered
- Marilyn Manson - Antichrist Superstar
- Memento Mori - La danse macabre
- Mercyful Fate - Into the Unknown
- Metallica - Load
- Ministry - Filth Pig
- Monstrosity - Millennium
- Moonspell - Irreligious
- Morgana Lefay - Maleficium
- Morgoth - Feel Sorry for the Fanatic
- Mortician - Hacked Up for Barbecue
- Mortification - EnVision EvAngelene
- Motörhead - Overnight Sensation
- My Dying Bride - Like Gods of the Sun
- Napalm Death - Diatribes
- Necrophobic – Spawned by Evil (EP)
- Nevermore - The Politics of Ecstasy
- Neurosis - Through Silver in Blood
- Occult – The Enemy Within
- Old Man's Child - Born of the Flickering
- Orange 9mm - Tragic
- Orphanage - By Time Alone
- Oomph! - Wunschkind
- Opeth - Morningrise
- Overkill – The Killing Kind
- Pantera - The Great Southern Trendkill
- Pan.Thy.Monium - Khaooohs and Kon-Fus-Ion
- Pitchshifter - Infotainment?
- P.O.D. - Brown
- Poison - Poison's Greatest Hits: 1986–1996 (compilation)
- Iggy Pop – Nude & Rude: The Best of Iggy Pop
- Pro-Pain – Contents Under Pressure
- Prong - Rude Awakening
- Quo Vadis - Forever...
- Rage - Lingua Mortis (four re-recorded songs from the album Black in Mind, with arrangements for a classic orchestra)
- Rage - End of All Days
- Rage Against the Machine - Evil Empire
- Rotting Christ - Triarchy of the Lost Lovers
- Rush - Test for Echo
- Sacred Reich - Heal
- Samael - Passage
- Satyricon - Nemesis Divina
- Scorpions – Pure Instinct
- Sepultura - Roots
- Sentenced - Down
- Slayer - Undisputed Attitude
- Slipknot - Mate. Feed. Kill. Repeat. (demo)
- Solitude Aeturnus - Downfall
- Soundgarden - Down on the Upside
- Staind - Tormented
- Steelheart – Wait
- Stone Temple Pilots – Tiny Music... Songs from the Vatican Gift Shop
- Stratovarius - Episode
- Stuck Mojo - Pigwalk
- Summoning - Dol Guldur
- Theatre of Tragedy - Velvet Darkness They Fear
- The 3rd and the Mortal - Painting on Glass
- The Hellacopters – Supershitty to the Max!
- Therion - Theli
- Thorr's Hammer - Dommedagsnatt (EP)
- Tool - Ænima
- Type O Negative - October Rust
- Steve Vai - Fire Garden
- Vader - Future of the Past
- Van Halen - Best Of – Volume I (compilation)
- Virgin Steele - The Marriage of Heaven and Hell Part II
- Vision of Disorder - Vision of Disorder
- Warrant - Belly to Belly
- Warrant – The Best of Warrant
- Xentrix - Scourge
- Zakk Wylde – Book of Shadows

Release Date	Artist	Album	Country
19 Jan 1996	The 3rd and the Mortal	Painting on Glass	Norway
25 Jan 1996	Dimmu Borgir	Stormblåst	Norway
26 Jan 1996	Napalm Death	Diatribes	England
30 Jan 1996	Ministry	Filth Pig	USA
31 Jan 1996	Burzum	Filosofem	Norway
12 Feb 1996	Skyclad	Irrational Anthems	England
12 Feb 1996	Immolation	Here in After	USA
13 Feb 1996	Hypocrisy	Abducted	Sweden
17 Feb 1996	Malevolence	Dominium	Portugal
19 Feb 1996	Bruce Dickinson	Skunkworks	England
19 Feb 1996	Secret Discovery	A Question of Time	Germany
20 Feb 1996	In Flames	The Jester Race	Sweden
20 Feb 1996	Sepultura	Roots	Brazil
27 Feb 1996	Cemetary	Sundown	Sweden
02 Apr 1996	Edge of Sanity	Crimson	Sweden
02 Apr 1996	Neurosis	Through Silver in Blood	USA
22 Apr 1996	Cradle of Filth	V Empire, or Dark Faerytales in Phallustein	England
22 Apr 1996	Nefilim	Zoon	England
22 Apr 1996	Satyricon	Nemesis Divina	Norway
26 Apr 1996	Dissection	Where Dead Angels Lie	Sweden
29 Apr 1996	Rotting Christ	Triarchy of the Lost Lovers	Greece
May 1996	Inhuman	Strange Desire	Portugal
06 May 1996	Pantera	The Great Southern Trendkill	USA
14 May 1996	Amorphis	Elegy	Finland
20 May 1996	Cannibal Corpse	Vile	USA
20 May 1996	Iced Earth	The Dark Saga	USA
26 May 1996	Crematory	Crematory	Germany
27 May 1996	Bathory	Blood on Ice	Sweden
28 May 1996	Nevermore	In Memory	USA
01 Jun 1996	Carcass	Swansong	England
03 Jun 1996	Arcturus	Aspera Hiems Symfonia	Norway
04 Jun 1996	Metallica	Load	USA
05 Jun 1996	Desire	Infinity... A Timeless Journey Through an Emotional Dream	Portugal
05 Jun 1996	Dismal Euphony	Dismal Euphony (EP)	Norway
05 Jun 1996	Dødheimsgard	Monumental Possession	Norway
10 Jun 1996	Gorefest	Soul Survivor	Holland
13 Jun 1996	Apocalyptica	Plays Metallica by Four Cellos	Finland
18 Jun 1996	Pro-Pain	Contents Under Pressure	USA
19 Jun 1996	Dimmu Borgir	Devil's Path (EP)	Norway
24 Jun 1996	Marduk	Heaven Shall Burn... When We Are Gathered	Sweden
24 Jun 1996	Opeth	Morningrise	Sweden
July 1996	Arcana	Dark Age of Reason	Sweden
July 1996	Limbonic Art	Moon in the Scorpio	Norway
01 Jul 1996	Psychotic Waltz	Bleeding	USA
3 Jul 1996	Cryptosy	None So Vile	Canada
13 Jul 1996	Nevermore	The Politics of Ecstasy	USA
15 Jul 1996	Empyrium	A Wintersunset...	Germany
18 Jul 1996	Orphaned Land	El Norra Alila	Israel
23 Jul 1996	Earth	Pentastar: In the Style of Demons	USA
23 Jul 1996	Massacre	Promise	USA
29 Jul 1996	Moonspell	Irreligious	Portugal
29 Jul 1996	Solitude Aeturnus	Downfall	USA
31 Jul 1996	Atrocity	Willenskraft	Germany
Aug 1996	Decayed	Resurrectiónem Mortuórum	Portugal
01 Aug 1996	Katatonia	Brave Murder Day	Sweden
03 Aug 1996	Borknagar	Borknagar	Norway
05 Aug 1996	Sinister	Bastard Saints	Holland
06 Aug 1996	Dying Fetus	Purification Through Violence	USA
09 Aug 1996	Therion	Theli	Sweden
13 Aug 1996	White Zombie	Supersexy Swingin' Sounds	USA
17 Aug 1996	Sear Bliss	Phantoms	Hungary
19 Aug 1996	Samael	Passage	Switzerland
19 Aug 1996	Type 0 Negative	October Rust	USA
20 Aug 1996	James Murphy	Convergence	USA
20 Aug 1996	Mercyful Fate	Into the Unknown	Denmark
27 Aug 1996	Monstrosity	Millennium	USA
27 Aug 1996	Heavenwood	Diva	Portugal
28 Aug 1996	Cradle of Filth	Dusk and Her Embrace	England

== Disbandments ==
- Beherit
- Carnis
- Damn Yankees
- Down
- Extreme
- Mumbo's Brain
- Prong
- Sexart
- Skid Row
- Tesla
- Trouble

== Events ==
- Alice in Chains plays their last concert with Layne Staley on July 23, 1996.
- Body Count drummer Beatmaster V dies of leukemia.
- The first Ozzfest tour sets off, with headliners Ozzy Osbourne, Slayer and Danzig.
- The original line-up of Kiss (Ace Frehley, Gene Simmons, Peter Criss, Paul Stanley) come back together.
- Bassist Greg Christian of Testament left the band, leaving guitarist Eric Peterson as the sole ever-present in the line-up.
- Slash leaves Guns N' Roses, citing differences with Axl Rose.
- Sammy Hagar departs Van Halen after a feud with Eddie Van Halen. Van Halen briefly reunites with David Lee Roth at a highly publicized event at the MTV Video Music Awards, but fires him shortly thereafter.
- Tim 'Ripper' Owens fills the void left by Rob Halford in 1993 as lead singer of Judas Priest.

Preceded by 1995	Heavy Metal Timeline; 1996	Succeeded by 1997
