= Melnā Piektdiena =

Concert venue in Riga, Latvia

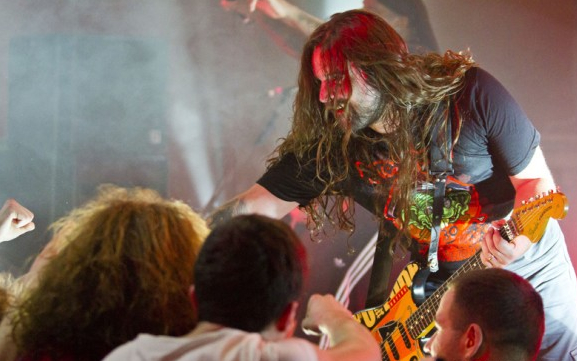
Andreas Kisser of Sepultura performing at Melnā Piektdiena club (March 2012)

The Melnā Piektdiena club ("The Black Friday" in Latvian) is an underground, heavy-metal, and extreme music concert venue in Riga, Latvia. Opened in 2006, over the years it has hosted shows by some of the most respected artists within a variety of genres.

== History ==
The venue grew out of the legendary series of Black Friday concerts, which have been held in Riga since the early 1990s, whenever the 13th day of a month falls on a Friday. A series of Latvian metal music compilation CDs were released under the club's name. Since the same promoters staged the metal shows and produced the compilation records, they decided to use an already established name for the CDs. The club is located in an industrial area, between the railway and RVR factory, at 193c Brīvības Street, close to central Riga.

The club opened on Friday, May 13, 2006, with a show by the leading Latvian, technical, death metal band Neglected Fields, whose front man, Sergejs "Destruction" Kustovs, became a co-owner of the venue. Since its first event, Melnā Piektdiena has become the linchpin of the Latvian metal music scene.

Despite its official capacity of only 666 guests (which can be updated to 1000 concertgoers if the bar and smoking area capacities are counted in), the cult reputation of the club attracts world-famous foreign metal bands, as well as local and Baltic musicians. The club also embraces other genres of music, including gothic, progressive rock, electronic, and industrial music among others.

== Notable performers ==
The following list might be incomplete. Some of the bands mentioned below have played Melnā Piektdiena more than once.

=== 2006 ===
Carpathian Forest, Keep of Kalessin, Hate, Danny Cavanagh, Moonspell, and To/Die/For played, plus shows with local bands were held. A series of concerts called InnerFade was launched.

=== 2007 ===
Napalm Death, Cannibal Corpse, Type O Negative, Krisiun, Týr, Samael, Rotting Christ, Leaves' Eyes, Atrocity, Decapitated, Incantation, Marduk, Chthonic, and Antimatter, among others, played.

=== 2008 ===
Obtest, Soilwork, Overkill, Anal Cunt, Dark the Suns, Negură Bunget, Paul Gilbert, Vader, Grave, Immolation, Melechesh, Enslaved, Metsatöll, Excrementory Grindfuckers, and Emilie Autumn, among others, appeared.

=== 2009 ===
Kreator, Caliban, Eluveitie, Richie Kotzen, Shining, Blaze Bayley, Chimaira, Unearth, Throwdown, and Dååth played. An Anthrax concert was planned, but did not happen because the band cancelled their entire European tour due to a change of vocalists. Local traditions were continued, such as the Fresh Blood band battle. The first Under the Black Metal Siege event was organized by Dark Domination.

=== 2010 ===
Dark Funeral, Nargaroth, Carach Angren, Brian «Head» Welch of Korn, Despised Icon, Winds of Plague, Parkway Drive, Torture Killer, 50 Lions, Sadist, Nokturnal Mortum, Sabaton, Alestorm, Therion, and Loch Vostok appeared. A summer mini-fest was announced at the club in July headlined by Napalm Death and featuring Black Cobra, Weedeater, Saviours and Caliban, along with other acts. The festival was a stripped-down version of the Open Air Metalshow previously held annually at Blome near Smiltene town in the Vidzeme region; by 2010 the economic crisis had severely hurt Latvia, and the promoters could not afford a full-scale major event. The smaller festival, held in and around the Melnā Piektdiena venue, proved even more unsuccessful, nearly dragging the club into bankruptcy. The Midsummer Metal Fest has been discontinued in Latvia since then.

=== 2011 ===
Combichrist, Mortiis, Obituary, Sacramental, Nile, Onslaught, Suidakra, Gods Tower, and Amorphis played Melnā Piektdiena for the first time, as well as many returning bands. For the first time, Wacken Metal Battle was announced for Latvian bands to win a chance to play at the largest European metal fest, the Wacken Open Air in Germany, plus being eligible to compete for a record deal with Nuclear Blast. A thrash metal band from Rēzekne, Sacramental, won the inaugural Latvian Wacken Metal Battle, followed by progressive death metal 4-piece Opifex (Riga) and thrashers Asthma (Daugavpils) in the next years' competitions. The Fresh Blood band competition was cancelled as it was observed, over the years, that quick local fame was doing more harm than good to up-and-coming bands over the long term.

=== 2012 ===
Sepultura, Soulfly, Fear Factory, Altar of Plagues, Death in June, Monarch!, Hatesphere, Michael Angelo Batio, Rotting Christ, Sacramental, Cradle of Filth, Celldweller and Аркона, plus others appeared. A new annual event, Doomevening (or "Drūmvakar!" in Latvian), was established by Frailty's management. On the December 21, following the so-called 2012 phenomenon, a special event "Pasaules gals" ("End of the World") featuring a nude S&M show was held.

=== 2013 ===
Meshuggah, Children of Bodom, Sacramental, Converge, Rotten Sound, Riverside, Betraying the Martyrs, Master, Ufomammut, and U.D.O. appeared. Evoken appeared at the Antithesis III event. For their show in Riga, Hypocrisy renamed their all-time biggest hit "Roswell 47" (from their album Abducted) to "Riga 47" for one night.

=== 2014 ===
Shows by Turisas, Esoteric, and others were announced for 2014.

== Events ==
The venue also hosts the annual Latvian Metal Music Awards ceremony. The club, while primarily devoted to extreme music, is open to all kinds of shows and promoters of all types of bands, projects, and genres, including: electronic music, house, hip hop, dubstep etc.

There is a tradition, after playing Melnā Piektdiena for the first time, foreign band members are asked to autograph an A4 photo of themselves, which is then framed and permanently hung at the wall near the bar.

== 2011 murder controversy ==
In the early hours of the parliamentary election day, September 17, a local electronic dance music DJ and event promoter Aļiks Kalašņikovs was murdered outside the club while leaving the venue. Following a drunken brawl in a parking lot, the victim was shot seven times in the stomach with an illegally modified gun and died fifteen minutes later. The killer, Alfrēds Guže, who at age 29 already had six previous convictions for armed robberies, aggravated assaults, and burglary, was arrested by the police four days later in part because of testimony by Melnā Piektdiena staff and other eyewitnesses. He was found guilty of manslaughter and was ordered to serve a 9-year and 3-month prison sentence that included an added year for another felony committed earlier.
