= Hypocrisy Destroys Wacken =

Live album by Hypocrisy
- Released: 2 March 1999
- Recorded: 8 August 1998, Wacken Open Air
- Genre: Melodic death metal
- Length: 65:12
- Label: Nuclear Blast
- Producer: Peter Tägtgren

Hypocrisy chronology
The Final Chapter (1997)	Hypocrisy Destroys Wacken (1999)	Hypocrisy (1999)

Professional ratings
Review scores
Source	Rating
AllMusic	2.5/5 stars

Hypocrisy Destroys Wacken is the first live album by Swedish melodic death metal band Hypocrisy, released in 1999. The DVD version of the album was released in March 2001.

== Track listing ==
All tracks are written by Hypocrisy.

No.	Title	Length
1.	"Roswell-47"	4:13
2.	"Inseminated Adoption"	4:22
3.	"A Coming Race"	4:57
4.	"Apocalypse"	5:29
5.	"Osculum Obscenum"	4:58
6.	"Buried"	2:49
7.	"Left to Rot"	3:52
8.	"The Fourth Dimension"	5:07
9.	"Pleasure of Molestation"	4:50
10.	"Killing Art"	2:48
11.	"The Final Chapter"	5:19
12.	"Time Warp"	3:58
13.	"Til the End"	5:44
14.	"Fuck U"	3:46
15.	"Beginning of the End"	2:54

Bonus tracks for Japan
No.	Title	Length
16.	"Request Denied"	4:43
17.	"Strange Ways" (Kiss cover)	3:25

Tracks 12–15 are studio recordings.

== Credits ==
=== Band members ===
- Peter Tägtgren − guitars, vocals
- Mathias Kamijo − guitars
- Mikael Hedlund − bass
- Lars Szöke − drums

=== Production ===
- Recorded at the Wacken Open Air, Germany, 8 August 1998
- Mixed by Lars Johannson in Studio Hängballe
- Photo editing by Ari Willey
- Art direction by Flea Black
- DVD version video cutting by Ari Williey
