= Osculum Obscenum =

Studio album by Hypocrisy
- Released: 12 October 1993
- Recorded: March 1993
- Studio: Studio Rockshop
- Genre: Death metal
- Length: 42:13
- Label: Nuclear Blast
- Producer: Markus Staiger, Peter Tägtgren

Hypocrisy chronology
Penetralia (1992)	Osculum Obscenum (1993)	The Fourth Dimension (1994)

Professional ratings
Review scores
Source	Rating
AllMusic	4/5 stars
Metal1.info	7/10
Metal.de	8/10

Osculum Obscenum is the second studio album by Swedish melodic death metal band Hypocrisy, released in 1993. The cover artwork was created by Wes Benscoter. Osculum Obscenum was re-released in 1996 as a digipak with bonus tracks and a photo of the band line-up from that year with Mikael Hedlund, Peter Tägtgren and Lars Szöke. The album was since reissued multiple times alongside the band's other earlier death metal albums, resulting in mildly positive reviews.

== Track listing ==
All lyrics are written by Masse Broberg; all music is composed by Hypocrisy.

No.	Title	Length
1.	"Pleasure of Molestation"	6:01
2.	"Exclamation of a Necrofag"	5:07
3.	"Osculum Obscenum"	5:07
4.	"Necronomicon"	4:14
5.	"Black Metal" (Venom cover)	2:54
6.	"Inferior Devoties"	4:42
7.	"Infant Sacrifices"	4:15
8.	"Attachment to the Ancestor"	5:35
9.	"Althotas"	4:21
Total length:		42:13

=== Bonus tracks on 1996 re-issue ===
From Inferior Devoties
No.	Title	Length
10.	"Symbol of Baphomet"	2:56
11.	"Mental Emotions"	3:13
12.	"God Is a Lie"	2:58
13.	"Black Magic" (Slayer cover)	3:22

From Pleasure of Molestation
No.	Title	Length
14.	"Pleasure of Molestation (demo)"	4:38
15.	"Exclamation of a Necofag (demo)"	5:10
16.	"Necronomicon (demo)"	4:14
17.	"Attachment to the Ancestor (demo)"	4:38

== Personnel ==
Hypocrisy

- Masse Broberg − vocals
- Peter Tägtgren − electric guitar, keyboards
- Michael Hedlund − bass guitar
- Lars Szöke − drums

Guest

- Wes Benscoter − cover artwork
