= Live in Germania =

Live album by Marduk
- Released: July 7, 1997
- Recorded: 1996 during the Heaven Shall Burn tour, Germany
- Genre: Black metal
- Length: 59:22
- Label: Osmose Productions
- Producer: Marduk

Marduk chronology
Glorification (1996)	Live in Germania (1997)	Here's No Peace (1997)

2008 edition cover

Professional ratings
Review scores
Source	Rating
AllMusic	4/5 stars
Chronicles of Chaos	8/10
Collector's Guide to Heavy Metal	5/10

Live in Germania is the first live album by Swedish black metal band Marduk. It was recorded at four venues in Germany during the Heaven Shall Burn 1996 tour, engineered and edited at The Abyss, and released on July 7, 1997 by Osmose Productions. The album was originally announced by the band as titled The Black Years, but this was later opted out. Live in Germania is the only Marduk album to feature Peter Tägtgren of Hypocrisy, and also the band's mixer, on guitar. The album was reissued in 2008 by Regain Records.

== Track listing ==
No.	Title	Length
1.	"Beyond the Grace of God"	5:08
2.	"Sulphur Souls"	5:43
3.	"The Black..."	3:52
4.	"Darkness it Shall Be"	4:51
5.	"Materialized in Stone"	5:08
6.	"Infernal Eternal"	4:59
7.	"On Darkened Wings"	3:48
8.	"Wolves"	5:37
9.	"Untrodden Paths (Wolves Part II)"	5:37
10.	"Dracul va Domni Din Nou in Transilvania"	5:08
11.	"Legion"	5:45
12.	"Total Desaster" (Destruction cover)	3:40

== Trivia ==
- Germania was the Latin exonym for a geographical area of land on the east bank of the Rhine (inner Germania), which included regions of Sarmatia as well as an area under Roman control on the west bank of the Rhine.
- Germania also was the name Adolf Hitler gave to the projected renewal of the German capital Berlin.

== Personnel ==
Marduk

- Legion – vocals
- Morgan Steinmeyer Håkansson – guitar
- B. War – bass
- Fredrik Andersson – drums

Additional musicians

- Peter Tägtgren – guitar, engineering, editing

Production

- Spencer Hoogelwood - live recording engineer
