= The Abyss (musical project) =

Swedish black metal band

The Abyss was a Swedish black metal side project by members of the death metal band Hypocrisy. They were active from 1994 to 1998 and recorded two albums. The Other Side was the first album recorded in The Abyss studio.

== Members ==
- Peter Tägtgren – vocals, drums, bass
- Lars Szöke – guitars, vocals
- Mikael Hedlund – guitars, vocals

== Discography ==
- The Other Side (1995)
- Summon the Beast (1996)
- In Conspiracy with Satan (1998) – a Bathory tribute album, covered the song "Armageddon"
