= Slaughtersun (Crown of the Triarchy) =

Studio album by Dawn
- Released: August 1998
- Recorded: April 1997
- Studio: Abyss Studios
- Genre: Melodic black metal; melodic death metal
- Length: 58:53
- Label: Necropolis Records
- Producer: Paul Thind

Dawn chronology
Sorgh på svarte vingar fløgh (1996)	Slaughtersun (Crown of the Triarchy) (1998)

Slaughtersun (Crown of the Triarchy) is the third studio album by Swedish black metal band Dawn. It was released via Necropolis Records in August 1998.

On 17 June 2014, the album was remastered and reissued on Century Media Records. It was remastered by Dan Swanö at Unisound Studio in November 2013. The release features reworked artwork, layout, and design, which was handled by Daniel Viberg and Dawn.

== Musical style, writing, composition ==
AllMusic described the band and album's style as "black metal in the ultra-melodic vein of Dissection, only way more intense." He also compared the album to Enslaved's first album, and wrote that "Dawn has blind-sided the black metal world with what appears to be the Anthems to the Welkin at Dusk of 1998, adding that "Balance is what drives this album. Balance between breakneck speed and mid-paced melody. Balance that doesn't sacrifice fierce, raw metal for symphonic dribble (not that there aren't a great deal of well-placed symphonic undertones)." Terrorizer wrote that "the atmosphere enveloping "Slaughtersun" has a definite filmic quality that makes it less traditionally constructed than most albums in this genre."

All of the music was composed by Fredrik Söderberg who also performed lead, rhythm, and acoustic guitars on the album. The band had material for 13 songs, but only recorded 9 of them, of which only 7 made it onto the album due to the restrictions of the CD format.

== Critical reception and legacy ==
AllMusic's Jason Hundey has described the album as "their most accomplished work thus far, building off the progress made on the mini-album Sorgh Pa Svarte Vingar Flogh, but taking the sound to a whole new level. Although it took 15-plus listens to find words for this majestic black metal crown of achievement, it only took one to realize the sheer magnitude and power this album produces." Terrorizer named it one of the '100 Most Important Albums of the Nineties'.

== Track listing ==
All music is composed by Fredrik Söderberg.

No.	Title	Lyrics	Length
1.	"The Knell and the World"	Martin Hellkvist	9:00
2.	"Falcula"	Henke Forss	10:10
3.	"To Achieve the Ancestral Powers" (Instrumental)		2:02
4.	"Ride the Wings of Pestilence"	Philip Von Segebaden	9:43
5.	"The Aphelion Deserts"	Hellkvist	8:31
6.	"Stalker's Blessing"	Forss	8:21
7.	"Malediction Murder"	Forss	11:06

== Personnel ==
Credits adapted from liner notes.

=== Dawn ===
- Henke Forss – vocals
- Fredrik Söderberg – lead guitar, rhythm guitar, acoustic guitar
- Andreas Fullmestad – rhythm guitar
- Lars Tängmark – bass guitar
- Jocke Petterson – drums

=== Additional personnel ===
- Paul Thind – executive producer
- Peter Tägtgren – engineering, mixing
- Dan Swanö – remastering
- Anton H. LeClercq – band photography
- Daniel Viberg – reissue layout and design
