= Penetralia =

Studio album by Hypocrisy
- Released: 5 October 1992
- Studio: Studio Rockshop
- Genre: Death metal
- Length: 42:22
- Label: Nuclear Blast
- Producer: Markus Staiger, Peter Tägtgren

Hypocrisy chronology
Rest in Pain '92 (1992)	Penetralia (1992)	Osculum Obscenum (1993)

Professional ratings
Review scores
Source	Rating
AllMusic	link

Penetralia is the debut studio album by Swedish melodic death metal band Hypocrisy, released in 1992. The cover artwork was created by Dan Seagrave. The digipak reissue contains two bonus tracks: "Life of Filth" (from Death....Is Just the Beginning II) and "Lead by Satanism". The album was since reissued multiple times alongside the band's other earlier death metal albums, resulting in mixed-to-positive reviews.

Lyrical themes explored on the album include antireligion and blasphemy, most notoriously in "God Is a Lie".

== Track listing ==
All lyrics are written by Masse Broberg; all music is composed by Hypocrisy.

No.	Title	Length
1.	"Impotent God"	3:49
2.	"Suffering Souls"	3:27
3.	"Nightmare"	4:29
4.	"Jesus Fall"	3:28
5.	"God Is a Lie"	2:59
6.	"Left to Rot"	3:34
7.	"Burn by the Cross"	4:47
8.	"To Escape Is to Die"	3:54
9.	"Take the Throne"	5:21
10.	"Penetralia"	6:34
Total length:		42:22

Reissue
No.	Title	Length
11.	"Life of Filth"
12.	"Lead by Satanism"
Total length:		51:32

"God Is a Lie" is sometimes called "God Is A..." on the back cover.

== Credits ==
Hypocrisy

- Masse Broberg − vocals
- Peter Tägtgren − guitar, keyboards on track 10, vocals on track 10, drums on tracks 1–3 and 5–8
- Mikael Hedlund − bass
- Jonas Osterberg − guitar
- Lars Szoke − drums on tracks 4, 9, 10

Guest

- Dan Seagrave − cover artwork
