= The Fourth Dimension (Hypocrisy album) =

Studio album by Hypocrisy
- Released: 25 October 1994
- Recorded: March–April 1994
- Studio: Park Studio, Stockholm, Sweden
- Genre: Death metal; melodic death metal
- Length: 52:48
- Label: Nuclear Blast
- Producer: Peter Tägtgren

Hypocrisy chronology
Osculum Obscenum (1993)	The Fourth Dimension (1994)	Abducted (1996)

Professional ratings
Review scores
Source	Rating
AllMusic	4/5 stars

The Fourth Dimension is the third studio album by Swedish melodic death metal band Hypocrisy, released on 25 October 1994. The limited edition digipak (cat.-no. NB 112-2 DIGI), not to be confused with the digipak re-release, has the track "The Abyss" instead of "The Arrival of the Demons". This track was later re-recorded for The Arrival album. The digipak re-release contains two bonus tracks, "Request Denied" and "Strange Ways", taken from the Maximum Abduction EP. After the departure of vocalist Masse Broberg, Hypocrisy's lyrics began to focus more on the paranormal and science fiction. The person on the cover is Mikael Hedlund, Hypocrisy's bassist. The album was since reissued alongside the band's other earlier death metal albums, resulting in positive feedback.

== Track listing ==
No.	Title	Length
1.	"Apocalypse"	5:55
2.	"Mind Corruption"	3:50
3.	"Reincarnation"	3:48
4.	"Reborn"	3:06
5.	"Black Forest"	4:23
6.	"Never to Return"	4:08
7.	"Path to Babylon"	3:43
8.	"Slaughtered"	5:39
9.	"Orgy in Blood"	3:20
10.	"The North Wind"	3:45
11.	"T.E.M.P.T."	3:19
12.	"The Fourth Dimension"	5:51
13.	"The Arrival of the Demons (Part 1)"	1:50
Total length:		52:48

== Credits ==
=== Band members ===
- Peter Tägtgren − vocals, electric guitars, keyboards
- Mikael Hedlund − bass guitar
- Lars Szöke − drums

=== Production ===
- Produced and mixed by Peter Tägtgren
- Engineered by Gunnar Silins
- Mastered by Gunnar Silins, at Park Studio, Stockholm
- Photos, art and design by P Grøn, Sweden
- Executive producer M. Staiger

== Charts ==
Chart performance for Hypocrisy
Chart (2005)	Peak position
German Albums (Offizielle Top 100)	86
