= The Last Stand (Sabaton album) =

2016 studio album by Sabaton

Studio album by Sabaton
- Released: 19 August 2016
- Recorded: April–May 2016
- Studio: The Abyss, Pärlby, Sweden
- Genre: Power metal
- Length: 36:56
- Label: Nuclear Blast
- Producer: Peter Tägtgren

Sabaton chronology
Heroes (2014)	The Last Stand (2016)	The Great War (2019)

Singles from The Last Stand
- 1. "The Lost Battalion" Released: 10 June 2016; 2. "Blood of Bannockburn" Released: 15 July 2016; 3. "Shiroyama" Released: 12 August 2016

The Last Stand is the eighth studio album by the Swedish power metal band Sabaton. It was produced by Peter Tägtgren in the Abyss Studios in Sweden and released on 19 August 2016. Like Sabaton's previous album Heroes, The Last Stand is a concept album and takes inspiration from "last stand" military battles. On 10 June 2016 the first single "The Lost Battalion" was released, followed by "Blood of Bannockburn" on 15 July and "Shiroyama" on 12 August. A lyric video for the title track was released on 25 January 2018. It would be their last album to feature guitarist Thobbe Englund following his departure in July 2016. He would then return to the band in February 2024, following the departure of guitarist Tommy Johansson.

In 2021, Sabaton released a special History Channel Edition of the album to subscribers to the Sabaton History Patreon, featuring historical prefaces to each song by channel host Indy Neidell. The version had originally been planned for April 2020, but it and the History Channel Edition of Heroes suffered production delays due to the COVID-19 pandemic and label Nuclear Blast's purchase by Believe Digital. The albums finally shipped to subscribers on 25 June 2021.

== Track listing ==
No.	Title	Lyrics	Music	Theme	Length
1.	"Sparta"	Joakim Brodén · Pär Sundström	Brodén · Ken Kängström	The Battle of Thermopylae from the Spartans' perspective	4:24
2.	"Last Dying Breath"	Brodén · Sundström	Brodén · Kängström	The Serbian defence of Belgrade	3:22
3.	"Blood of Bannockburn"	Brodén · Sundström	Brodén	The Battle of Bannockburn from the Scottish perspective	2:54
4.	"Diary of an Unknown Soldier"	Brodén · Sundström	Brodén	The Meuse-Argonne Offensive	0:51
5.	"The Lost Battalion"	Brodén · Sundström	Brodén	The Lost Battalion (World War I) during the Battle of the Argonne	3:35
6.	"Rorke's Drift"	Brodén · Sundström	Brodén	The Battle of Rorke's Drift from the British perspective	3:26
7.	"The Last Stand"	Brodén · Sundström	Brodén · Chris Rörland	The last stand of the Swiss Guards during the Sack of Rome (1527)	3:55
8.	"Hill 3234"	Brodén · Sundström	Brodén	The Battle for Hill 3234	3:29
9.	"Shiroyama"	Brodén	Brodén · Thobbe Englund	The Battle of Shiroyama	3:31
10.	"Winged Hussars"	Brodén · Sundström	Brodén	The Polish hussars in the Battle of Vienna	3:51
11.	"The Last Battle"	Brodén · Sundström	Brodén	The Battle of Castle Itter	3:12

Bonus tracks
No.	Title	Theme	Length
12.	"Camouflage" (Stan Ridgway cover)	The Vietnam War	3:56
13.	"All Guns Blazing" (Judas Priest cover)		3:58
14.	"Afraid to Shoot Strangers" (Iron Maiden cover; bonus track in earbook edition)	The Gulf War	7:28
15.	"Burn in Hell" (Twisted Sister cover; bonus track in Japan edition)		4:25
Total length:			56:43

Bonus live DVD (digipak and earbook edition)
No.	Title	Length
1.	"The March to War"	2:00
2.	"Ghost Division"	4:06
3.	"Far from the Fame"	3:46
4.	"Uprising"	6:00
5.	"Midway"	4:09
6.	"Gott mit uns"	3:27
7.	"Resist and Bite"	4:34
8.	"Wolfpack"	5:06
9.	"Dominium Maris Baltici & The Lion from the North"	5:33
10.	"Carolus Rex"	6:48
11.	"Swedish Pagans"	4:51
12.	"Soldier of 3 Armies"	4:12
13.	"Attero Dominatus"	3:58
14.	"The Art of War"	5:12
15.	"Wind of Change"	1:23
16.	"To Hell and Back"	4:25
17.	"Night Witches"	4:25
18.	"Primo Victoria"	6:00
19.	"Metal Crüe"	7:47

Bonus live CD (earbook edition)
No.	Title	Length
1.	"The March to War"	2:03
2.	"Ghost Division"	4:04
3.	"Far from the Fame"	3:46
4.	"Uprising"	5:59
5.	"Midway"	4:10
6.	"Gott mit uns"	3:27
7.	"Resist and Bite"	3:28
8.	"Dominium Maris Baltici & The Lion from the North"	5:32
9.	"Carolus Rex"	6:48
10.	"Swedish Pagans"	4:51
11.	"Soldier of 3 Armies"	4:14
12.	"Attero Dominatus"	3:56
13.	"The Art of War"	5:12
14.	"Wind of Change"	1:23
15.	"To Hell and Back"	4:25
16.	"Night Witches"	4:25
17.	"Primo Victoria"	6:01
18.	"Metal Crüe"	4:50

== Personnel ==
- Joakim Brodén: lead vocals, keyboards
- Pär Sundström: bass, backing vocals
- Chris Rörland: guitars, backing vocals
- Thobbe Englund: guitars, backing vocals, co-lead vocals on "All Guns Blazing"
- Hannes Van Dahl: drums, backing vocals

Additional credits:

- Spoken words on "Diary of an Unknown Soldier" by Jon Schaffer
- Bagpipes on "Blood of Bannockburn" by Jonas Kjellgren
- Hammond Organ on "Blood of Bannockburn" by Tomas Sunmo

Choir credits:

- Christer Gärds, Anders Sandström, Bosse Gärds, Pontus Lekaregärd and Peter Hindén from Eternal (of Sweden),
- Thomas Nyström & Marie Mullback, Äsa Österlund, Hannele Junkala, Sofia Lundberg, Marie-Louise Strömqvist and Floor Jansen

== Charts ==
=== Weekly charts ===
Chart (2016–2017)	Peak position
Australian Albums (ARIA)	29
Austrian Albums (Ö3 Austria)	2
Belgian Albums (Ultratop Flanders)	3
Belgian Albums (Ultratop Wallonia)	11
Canadian Albums (Billboard)	43
Dutch Albums (Album Top 100)	11
Finnish Albums (Suomen virallinen lista)	1
French Albums (SNEP)	43
German Albums (Offizielle Top 100)	2
Hungarian Albums (MAHASZ)	12
Irish Albums (IRMA)	92
Italian Albums (FIMI)	67
New Zealand Heatseeker Albums (RMNZ)	5
Norwegian Albums (VG-lista)	11
Polish Albums (ZPAV)	2
Scottish Albums (OCC)	9
Swedish Albums (Sverigetopplistan)	1
Swiss Albums (Schweizer Hitparade)	1
UK Albums (OCC)	17
UK Independent Albums (OCC)	5
UK Rock & Metal Albums (OCC)	1
US Billboard 200	63
US Independent Albums (Billboard)	4
US Top Hard Rock Albums (Billboard)	2
US Top Rock Albums (Billboard)	5
US Indie Store Album Sales (Billboard)	9

=== Year-end charts ===
Chart (2016)	Position
Belgian Albums (Ultratop Flanders)	154
Swedish Albums (Sverigetopplistan)	53

Chart (2017)	Position
Swedish Albums (Sverigetopplistan)	83

== Certifications ==
Region	Certification	Certified units/sales
Czech Republic	Gold	2,500
Denmark (IFPI Danmark)	Gold	10,000^{‡}
Germany (BVMI)	Gold	100,000^{‡}
Poland (ZPAV)	Gold	10,000^{‡}
Sweden (GLF)	Gold	20,000^{‡}
^{‡} Sales+streaming figures based on certification alone.
