= Into the Abyss (album) =

Studio album by Hypocrisy
- Released: 22 May 2000
- Recorded: April 2000, The Abyss
- Genre: Melodic death metal
- Length: 42:04
- Label: Nuclear Blast
- Producer: Peter Tägtgren

Hypocrisy chronology
Hypocrisy (1999)	Into the Abyss (2000)	Catch 22 (2001)

Professional ratings
Review scores
Source	Rating
AllMusic	4/5 stars
Brave Words & Bloody Knuckles	5/10

Into the Abyss is the seventh studio album by Swedish melodic death metal band Hypocrisy. It was released on 22 May 2000 by Nuclear Blast. A digipak version of the album was also released.

== Track listing ==
No.	Title	Length
1.	"Legions Descend"	3:53
2.	"Blinded"	4:18
3.	"Resurrected"	5:36
4.	"Unleash the Beast"	3:29
5.	"Digital Prophecy"	3:08
6.	"Fire in the Sky"	4:58
7.	"Total Eclipse"	3:09
8.	"Unfold the Sorrow"	4:28
9.	"Sodomized"	3:19
10.	"Deathrow (No Regrets)"	5:46

== Credits ==
=== Band members ===
- Peter Tägtgren − guitars, vocals, keyboards
- Mikael Hedlund − bass
- Lars Szöke − drums

=== Production ===
- Produced by Peter Tägtgren
- Co-produced by Lars Szöke
- Recorded and mixed at The Abyss, April 2000
- Mastered by Peter In De Betou at Cutting Room, Stockholm, Sweden

=== Songwriting and composition ===
- Lyrics by Peter Tägtgren
- All arrangements by Hypocrisy
- Orchestra on the song "Fire in the Sky" written by Peter Tägtgren

== Charts ==
Chart performance for Into the Abyss
Chart (2000)	Peak position
German Albums (Offizielle Top 100)	64
