= Glorification (EP) =

EP by Marduk
- Released: September 1996
- Recorded: May 1996
- Studio: The Abyss, Pärlby, Sweden
- Genre: Black metal
- Length: 18:21
- Label: Osmose Productions
- Producer: Marduk

Marduk chronology
Heaven Shall Burn... When We Are Gathered (1996)	Glorification (1996)	Live in Germania (1997)

Professional ratings
Review scores
Source	Rating
AllMusic	3/5 stars
Chronicles of Chaos	8/10
Collector's Guide to Heavy Metal	5/10

Glorification is the first EP by Swedish black metal band Marduk. It was recorded and mixed at The Abyss in May 1996 and released that September by Osmose Productions.

== Track listing ==
No.	Title	Writer(s)	Length
1.	"Glorification of the Black God" (Remixed Version)	Marduk	4:50
2.	"Total Desaster" (Destruction cover)	Destruction	3:49
3.	"Sex with Satan" (Piledriver cover)	Bud Slaker, Sal Gibson	4:13
4.	"Sodomize the Dead" (Piledriver cover)	Bud Slaker, Sal Gibson	2:07
5.	"The Return of Darkness and Evil" (Bathory cover)	Quorthon	3:20

== Personnel ==
Marduk

- Legion – vocals
- Morgan Steinmeyer Håkansson – guitar
- B. War – bass
- Fredrik Andersson – drums

Guest

- Peter Tägtgren – engineer, mixing
