= End of Disclosure =

Studio album by Hypocrisy
- Released: 22 March 2013
- Studio: The Abyss
- Genre: Melodic death metal
- Length: 43:45
- Label: Nuclear Blast
- Producer: Peter Tägtgren

Hypocrisy chronology
A Taste of Extreme Divinity (2009)	End of Disclosure (2013)	Worship (2021)

End of Disclosure is the twelfth studio album by Swedish melodic death metal band Hypocrisy. It was released on 22 March 2013. To promote the album, Nuclear Blast released the music video "Tales of Thy Spineless" on 4 April.

== Background ==
Frontman Peter Tägtgren described End of Disclosure as a "back to basics" album. He indicated that the album was written after reflecting on the preceding albums, for which he felt that the band "lost it". By contrast, Tägtgren described End of Disclosure as "straight to the point. It's more Hypocrisy than ever — the fast, the heavy, the epic."

On 22 February 2013, Hypocrisy released a video for the title track of the album, "End of Disclosure".

== Critical reception ==
Professional ratings
Review scores
Source	Rating
About.com	4/5 stars
Brave Words & Bloody Knuckles	9/10
Decibel Magazine	6/10 stars
Exclaim!	7/10 stars
Metal.de	7/10
Metal Forces	7.5/10
Metal Hammer	4/5 stars
The Metal Observer	7/10
Peek from the Pit	8/10 stars
Stormbringer	4/5

The album received moderately positive reviews, with critics noting that the album would appeal to the band's fanbase but did not advance Hypocrisy's sound. Chris Dick, writing for Decibel Magazine, criticized End of Disclosure for its "potluck songwriting", which gave the impression that the album was "cycling through various stages of Hypocrisy's (and the Abyss's) repertoire, giving it a shiny, modern coat of paint and calling it an album". Natalie Zed, writing for About.com, praised the album for the "menace and hostility" of its atmosphere but described it as "an album that revisits familiar themes rather than break[s] new ground". Laura Wiebe explained in Exclaim! that the album accomplished Peter Tägtgren's intended goal of going "back to basics" and generally "rolls out more like a highlight reel of Hypocrisy's specialties".

== Track listing ==
No.	Title	Length
1.	"End of Disclosure"	4:46
2.	"Tales of Thy Spineless"	4:36
3.	"The Eye"	5:41
4.	"United We Fall"	4:50
5.	"44 Double Zero"	4:27
6.	"Hell Is Where I Stay"	4:34
7.	"Soldier of Fortune"	4:51
8.	"When Death Calls"	3:54
9.	"The Return"	6:06
Total length:		43:45

Bonus tracks
No.	Title	Length
10.	"Living Dead"	3:51
11.	"They Lie" (The Exploited cover)	2:37
Total length:		50:13

== Personnel ==
Hypocrisy

- Peter Tägtgren – guitars, vocals
- Mikael Hedlund – bass
- Reidar "Horgh" Horghagen – drums

Additional personnel

- Peter Tägtgren – mixing, recording
- Jonas Kjellgren – mastering, guitar solo (2)
- Wes Benscoter – cover art
- Rob Kimura – layout
- Hypocrisy − songwriting (1–10)
- Wattie Buchan – songwriting (11)

== Charts ==
Chart performance for End of Disclosure
Chart (2013)	Peak position
Austrian Albums (Ö3 Austria)	56
Finnish Albums (Suomen virallinen lista)	30
Belgian Albums (Ultratop Flanders)	192
French Albums (SNEP)	151
German Albums (Offizielle Top 100)	35
Swedish Albums (Sverigetopplistan)	29
Swiss Albums (Schweizer Hitparade)	53
Belgian Albums (Ultratop Wallonia)	116
