= The Final Chapter (Hypocrisy album) =

Studio album by Hypocrisy
- Released: 23 September 1997
- Recorded: May 1997, The Abyss
- Genre: Melodic death metal
- Length: 54:45
- Label: Nuclear Blast
- Producer: Peter Tägtgren

Hypocrisy chronology
Abducted (1996)	The Final Chapter (1997)	Hypocrisy Destroys Wacken (1998)

Professional ratings
Review scores
Source	Rating
AllMusic	4.5/5 stars
Metal.de	9/10
Chronicles of Chaos	9/10
Rock Hard	9.5/10

The Final Chapter is the fifth studio album by Swedish melodic death metal band Hypocrisy, released in 1997 on Nuclear Blast. It was originally intended to be the band's "final chapter", but due to immense fan response the band decided to continue. The limited edition shaped CD did not include the track "Evil Invaders".

== Track listing ==
All tracks are written by Hypocrisy except where noted.

No.	Title	Length
1.	"Inseminated Adoption"	4:32
2.	"A Coming Race"	5:06
3.	"Dominion"	3:32
4.	"Inquire Within"	5:45
5.	"Last Vanguard"	3:23
6.	"Request Denied"	4:51
7.	"Through the Window of Time"	3:29
8.	"Shamateur"	5:16
9.	"Adjusting the Sun"	4:42
10.	"Lies"	4:36
11.	"Evil Invaders" (Razor cover)	3:50
12.	"The Final Chapter"	5:22

== Credits ==
=== Band members ===
- Peter Tägtgren − vocals, electric guitar, keyboards
- Mikael Hedlund − bass guitar
- Lars Szöke − drums

=== Production ===
- Produced and mixed by Peter Tägtgren
- Recorded, mastered and mixed in The Abyss studio, Sweden, May 1997
- Engineered by Hypocrisy
- Photo, art, design and lay-out by P.Grøn, Sweden

== Charts ==
Chart performance for Hypocrisy
Chart (2005)	Peak position
German Albums (Offizielle Top 100)	76
