= Worship (Hypocrisy album) =

Studio album by Hypocrisy
- Released: 26 November 2021
- Studio: The Abyss
- Genre: Melodic death metal
- Length: 50:27
- Label: Nuclear Blast
- Producer: Peter Tägtgren

Hypocrisy chronology
| End of Disclosure (2013) | Worship (2021) |

Professional ratings
Review scores
| Source | Rating |
|---|---|
| Blabbermouth | 8.5/10 |
| Distorted Sound | 9/10 |
| Kerrang! | 3/5 stars |
| Metal Crypt | 3.25/5 |
| Metal Rules | 4/5 |
| Rock Hard | 8/10 |

Worship is the thirteenth studio album by Swedish melodic death metal band Hypocrisy. It was released on 26 November 2021, eight years after End of Disclosure. It is the first metal album to be launched into space. Music videos for "Worship," "Chemical Whore," "Children of the Gray," and "Dead World" were made. This would be the last album with drummer Reidar "Horgh" Horghagen who left the band in April 2022.

== Track listing ==
| No. | Title | Length |
|---|---|---|
| 1. | "Worship" | 4:43 |
| 2. | "Chemical Whore" | 5:19 |
| 3. | "Greedy Bastards" | 4:03 |
| 4. | "Dead World" | 4:09 |
| 5. | "We're the Walking Dead" | 5:19 |
| 6. | "Brotherhood of the Serpent" | 4:23 |
| 7. | "Children of the Gray" | 5:16 |
| 8. | "Another Day" | 3:11 |
| 9. | "They Will Arrive" | 4:25 |
| 10. | "Bug in the Net" | 4:51 |
| 11. | "Gods of the Underground" | 4:48 |
| Total length: | | 50:27 |

== Personnel ==
Hypocrisy

- Peter Tägtgren – guitars, vocals
- Mikael Hedlund – bass
- Reidar "Horgh" Horghagen – drums

Other Personnel

- Peter Tägtgren – mixing, recording, songwriting
- Mikael Hedlund – songwriting (2, 7)
- Reidar "Horgh" Horghagen – songwriting (2, 11)
- Blake Armstrong – cover art
- Sebastian Tägtgren – songwriting (track 4)
- Marcelo Vasco – layout
- Hannah Verbeuren – photography
- Svante Forsbäck – mastering

== Charts ==
Chart performance for Worship
| Chart (2021) | Peak position |
|---|---|
| Finnish Albums (Suomen virallinen lista) | 12 |
| German Albums (Offizielle Top 100) | 16 |
| Swiss Albums (Schweizer Hitparade) | 16 |
