= Virus (Hypocrisy album) =

Studio album by Hypocrisy
- Released: 19 September 2005
- Recorded: November–December 2004
- Studios: The Abyss, Pärlby, Sweden
- Genre: Melodic death metal
- Length: 48:07
- Label: Nuclear Blast
- Producer: Peter Tägtgren

Hypocrisy chronology
The Arrival (2004)	Virus (2005)	A Taste of Extreme Divinity (2009)

Professional ratings
Review scores
Source	Rating
AllMusic	3.5/5 stars
Brave Words & Bloody Knuckles	8.5/10

Virus is the tenth studio album by Swedish melodic death metal band Hypocrisy. It was released on 19 September 2005 by Nuclear Blast. It is the first Hypocrisy album recorded with their new drummer Horgh from the black metal band Immortal and second guitarist Andreas Holma. The album features a music video for the song "Scrutinized".

Early pressings of the CD were sold with a 13-song limited edition live DVD, with 12 songs recorded in Strasbourg on Hypocrisy's 2004 tour as support of Cannibal Corpse, and from a different show they play the song "Total Disaster" by Destruction along with the band's vocalist and bass guitar player Marcel "Schmier" Schirmer. Some CDs have a bonus track, "Watch Out", which appears to be a demo of a song recorded in 2000.

Some early pressings have an error where a scratch sound can be heard on tracks 6 and 11. The Nuclear Blast record label said it would mail a replacement to anyone who had one of these glitched discs.

== Track listing ==
All tracks are written by Hypocrisy.

No.	Title	Length
1.	"XVI"	0:16
2.	"Warpath"	4:23
3.	"Scrutinized"	4:25
4.	"Fearless"	4:24
5.	"Craving for Another Killing"	3:50
6.	"Let the Knife Do the Talking"	4:15
7.	"A Thousand Lies"	4:52
8.	"Incised Before I've Ceased"	4:28
9.	"Blooddrenched"	3:42
10.	"Compulsive Psychosis"	4:14
11.	"Living to Die"	5:42

Limited edition DVD bonus tracks:
Tracks 1–12 were recorded in Strasbourg on 4 August 2004. Track 13 was recorded at the Bang Your Head!!! festival in 2003.

No.	Title	Length
1.	"Born Dead Buried Alive"	4:37
2.	"Fusion Programmed Mind"	4:15
3.	"Adjusting the Sun"	4:45
4.	"Eraser"	5:11
5.	"Turn the Page"	4:20
6.	"Fire in the Sky"	5:08
7.	"Necronomicon"	4:35
8.	"Slaves to the Parasites"	5:09
9.	"Reborn"	3:19
10.	"Roswell 47"	4:22
11.	"God is a Lie"	3:02
12.	"Deathrow (No Regrets)"	6:07
13.	"Total Desaster" (bonus track)	4:05

== Credits ==
=== Band members ===
- Peter Tägtgren − guitars, vocals, keyboards
- Andreas Holma − guitars
- Mikael Hedlund − bass
- Reidar Horghagen − drums

=== Guest musician ===
- Gary Holt - guitar solo on track 3

=== Production ===
- Recorded at The Abyss November–December 2004
- Produced and mixed by Peter Tägtgren
- Engineered by Hypocrisy
- Mastered in Cuttingroom by Björn Engelmann

== Charts ==
Chart performance for Virus
Chart (2005)	Peak position
Austrian Albums (Ö3 Austria)	75
German Albums (Offizielle Top 100)	76
Swedish Albums (Sverigetopplistan)	58
