= Hypocrisy (album) =

Studio album by Hypocrisy
- Released: 22 June 1999
- Recorded: December 1998 – January 1999; The Abyss
- Genre: Melodic death metal
- Length: 55:24
- Label: Nuclear Blast
- Producer: Peter Tägtgren

Hypocrisy chronology
Hypocrisy Destroys Wacken (1998)	Hypocrisy (1999)	Into the Abyss (2000)

Professional ratings
Review scores
Source	Rating
AllMusic	4.5/5 stars
Rock Hard	9.5/10

Hypocrisy is the sixth studio album by Swedish melodic death metal band Hypocrisy, released on 22 June 1999. The digipak version of the album includes the bonus track "Self Inflicted Overload". The Japanese release of the album includes three bonus tracks: "Self Inflicted Overload", a demo version of "Elastic Inverted Visions" and "Falling Through the Ground".

== Reception ==
In 2005, Hypocrisy was ranked number 408 in Rock Hard magazine's book The 500 Greatest Rock & Metal Albums of All Time.

== Track listing ==
All tracks are written by Hypocrisy.

No.	Title	Length
1.	"Fractured Millennium"	5:14
2.	"Apocalyptic Hybrid"	4:04
3.	"Fusion Programmed Minds"	4:39
4.	"Elastic Inverted Visions"	6:16
5.	"Reversed Reflections"	4:29
6.	"Until the End"	5:54
7.	"Paranormal Mysteria"	4:39
8.	"Time Warp"	3:51
9.	"Disconnected Magnetic Corridors"	5:25
10.	"Paled Empty Sphere"	6:15

Digipak Edition Bonus Track
No.	Title	Length
11.	"Selfinflicted Overload"	4:38

== Credits ==
Hypocrisy

- Peter Tägtgren − 7-string guitar, vocals, keyboards
- Michael Hedlund − bass
- Lars Szöke − drums

== Charts ==
Chart performance for Hypocrisy
Chart (2005)	Peak position
German Albums (Offizielle Top 100)	85
