= Catch 22 (Hypocrisy album) =

Studio album by Hypocrisy
- Released: 19 March 2002
- Recorded: August 2001
- Genre: Melodic death metal
- Length: 41:49
- Label: Nuclear Blast
- Producer: Peter Tägtgren

Hypocrisy chronology
Into the Abyss (2001)	Catch 22 (2002)	The Arrival (2004)

2008 re-release cover

Professional ratings
Review scores
Source	Rating
AllMusic	4/5 stars
Brave Words & Bloody Knuckles	9/10

Catch 22 is the eighth studio album by Swedish melodic death metal band Hypocrisy. It was released on 19 March 2002 by Nuclear Blast.

== Track listing ==
All tracks are written by Hypocrisy.

No.	Title	Length
1.	"Don't Judge Me"	2:28
2.	"Destroyed"	3:56
3.	"Edge of Madness"	4:59
4.	"A Public Puppet"	3:40
5.	"Uncontrolled"	4:41
6.	"Turn the Page"	4:05
7.	"Hatred"	4:46
8.	"Another Dead End (For Another Dead Man)"	3:44
9.	"Seeds of the Chosen One"	5:06
10.	"All Turns Black"	4:24

== 2008 re-release ==
On 9 May 2008, the album was re-released as Catch 22 V2.0.08. Peter Tägtgren re-recorded the vocals and guitar parts and remixed and remastered the album. He said on the official site, "We still think it is a great fucking album but it got slammed and misunderstood because of the vocal style and the drum sound and so on."

== Personnel ==
- Peter Tägtgren – guitars, vocals, keyboards
- Mikael Hedlund – bass
- Lars Szöke – drums

== Charts ==
Chart performance for Catch 22
Chart (2008)	Peak position
German Albums (Offizielle Top 100)	78
