= Dispatched =

Swedish melodic death metal band

- Origin: Gnesta, Sweden
- Genres: Melodic death metal Blackened death metal (early)
- Years active: 1992–2002, 2004–present (on hiatus)
- Labels: Rising Realm, Music for Nations, Medusa
- Members: Daniel Lundberg; Fredrik Karlsson; Dennis Nilsson; Mattias Hellman; Emil Larsson
- Past members: Krister Andersson; Jonas Kimbrell; Emanuel Åström; Dennis Hultin; Ulrika Forsberg; Fredrik Larsson; Mattias Hellman; Petter Furå

Dispatched are a Swedish melodic death metal band from Södertälje (originally from the Gnesta Municipality) formed in 1992.

== History ==
Daniel Lundberg and Krister Andersson formed Dispatched before New Year's Eve, 1991. Jonas Kimbrell and Emanuel Astrom joined the band later that year. They recorded their first demo, Dispatched into External, at Stone Studio.

In early 1993, they recorded two more demo tapes that helped the band gain attention from labels. One year later, Dispatched returned to the Unisound studio to record an eleven-song album, which was supposed to be released by Exhumed Productions in Germany. Kimbrell and Åström left the band after this recording.

Lundberg and Andersson continued for the rest of 1994, buying a four-channel studio and not rehearsing at all. By the end of 1995, Fredrik Larsson joined the band. They started to rehearse again. Until then, Exhumed Productions had only released four of the eleven songs as the 7-inch EP Awaiting the End. Before the summer of 1996, Andersson grew tired of the band and left. Exhumed Productions released Blackshadows, taken from the 1994 recording.

Lundberg and Larsson continued to rehearse. After the summer, they found drummer Mattias Hellman and keyboardist/vocalist Fredrik Karlsson. The band planned to record new songs until the summer of 1997, until Hellman was replaced with Dennis Nilsson. After some changes of studio dates, Dispatched recorded four songs in Studio Titan in September 1997, to be released as Returned to Your Mind. Nilsson became a full member of the band. Second guitar player Emil Larsson joined at the beginning of 1998.

This lineup began rehearsing for a new release. Between August 3 and 7, 1998, Dispatched visited The Abyss to record the MCD Promised Land with Tommy Tägtgren. Dispatched signed a one-MCD deal with Kshatryas Productions of Germany, and released Promised Land in late 1998.

In 1999, the band began rehearsing for a full-length album. In October, they entered Studio Abyss with producer Tägtgren. Dispatched recorded ten songs in twelve days. The band had received offers from several record companies before the session, but they refused to sign anything. Now with a whole album, entitled Motherwar, they sent out copies to record companies to see the reaction. The reviews were positive and Dispatched was offered deals from different labels. Dispatched signed to Music for Nations in March 2000 to release Motherwar.

Following the release of Motherwar, Larsson was replaced with bassist Mattias Hellman. The band went to Studio Fredman in 2001 to record their second album. However, this record was never released. The band continued to write songs and do live shows. In late 2002, Dispatched broke up.

Despite their break-up, many of Dispatched's fans requested a release of the band's last unreleased album, Terrorizer: The Last Chapter..., and a deal was made in 2003 to release this recording under Medusa Productions.

The band apparently got back together in 2004, and is currently on hold as they have no place to rehearse since Daniel Lundberg has moved far from the other band members.

== Band members ==
=== Current ===
- Fredrik Karlsson – vocals, bass guitar, keyboards (Dark Edge, Mind in Haze, Demon Seed)
- Emil Larsson – guitars (Massiv Ångest, M.M.I)
- Daniel Lundberg – guitars, keyboards (Dark Edge)
- Dennis Nilsson – drums (M.M.I) (G.I.L) Demon seed)

=== Former ===
- Krister Andersson – vocals (1991–1996)
- Jonas Kimbrell – bass guitar (1992–1994) (The Marble Icon, Cryptic Art)
- Emanuel Åström – drums (1992–1994)
- Dennis Hultin – guitar (1997)
- Ulrika Forsberg – guitar (1993)
- Fredrik Larsson – drums (1991, 1995–2000) (Dark Edge)
- Mattias Hellman – bass guitar (2000–2002) (ex-PitBullfarm, Scarecaows)
- Petter Furå – bass guitar (live 2002) (Ashes, Mind in haze, Malison Rogue)

== Discography ==
=== Demos/EPs ===
- Dispatched into External (1992, demo)
- Promo 1993 (1993, promo)
- Promo 2 (1993, promo)
- Blackshadows (1994, demo)
- Awaiting the End (1995, EP)
- Blackshadows (1996, EP)
- Returned to Your Mind (1997, EP)
- Promised Land (1998, EP)
- Terrorizer (2001, demo)

=== Albums ===
- Blackshadows (1994, Exhumed Productions)
- Motherwar (2000, Music for Nations)
- Terrorizer: The Last Chapter... (2003, Khaos/Medusa Productions)
- Terrorizer (2005, Crash Music/Rising Realm)
- Warfare (2022, Independent)
- Metal (2023, Independent)

=== Singles ===
- Motherwar (2000)
- The Last Song (2022)
- 1N57RUM37A1 (2022)
- Anubis (2022)
- Highlander (2022)
- Propaganda (2022)
- Hellhound Drinkers (2023)
- The One - The Only (2023)
- Highlander (X-mas Edition) (2023)
