= Psalms of Extinction =

Studio album by Pain
- Released: 16 April 2007
- Genre: Industrial metal
- Length: 48:00
- Label: Roadrunner
- Producer: Peter Tägtgren

Pain chronology
Dancing with the Dead (2005)	Psalms of Extinction (2007)	Cynic Paradise (2008)

Psalms of Extinction is the fifth studio album by the Swedish industrial metal project Pain, released on 16 April 2007 in Europe's Nordic territories and 7 May 2007 in the rest of Europe. The first Pain album since their debut to lack a charting single, it hit No. 21 on the Swedish charts but dropped off after only two weeks. "Zombie Slam" is the first song from the album to receive a video. The track "Play Dead" is a Björk cover.

Musicians featured on the album include Mikkey Dee (Motörhead, ex-Don Dokken, King Diamond) on "Zombie Slam" recording drums, Children of Bodom frontman Alexi Laiho on "Just Think Again" (guitar solo), and Peter Iwers of In Flames on the first two songs (bass guitar).

== Track listing ==
All songs written by Peter Tägtgren except where noted.

1. "Save Your Prayers" – 3:43
2. "Nailed to the Ground" – 4:11
3. "Zombie Slam" – 3:32
4. "Psalms of Extinction" – 4:09
5. "Clouds of Ecstasy" – 3:16
6. "Play Dead" (Björk, David Arnold, Jah Wobble) – 4:03
7. "Does It Really Matter" – 4:06
8. "Computer God" – 3:25
9. "Just Think Again" – 6:15
10. "Walking on Glass" – 3:51
11. "Bottle's Nest" – 3:36
12. "Bitch" – 3:47

=== Bonus tracks (Russian & UK Tour Edition)\ ===
13. "Behind the Wheel" (Depeche Mode Cover) – 4:10
14. "Here is the News" (Electric Light Orchestra Cover) – 3:54

"Behind the Wheel" also appears as a bonus track on the Japanese version.

== Reception ==
Professional ratings
Review scores
Source	Rating
AllMusic	3/5 stars

Allmusic praised the album for being both more exciting and more genuinely metal than Pain's previous albums, and also complimented its frequent stylistic shifts. However, they concluded "All in all, this clearly makes for a varied set... But while it may intrigue his metal-focused following as a nice stylistic departure, Psalms of Extinction is unlikely to wow serious industrial music freaks as anything remotely groundbreaking."
