= Dawn (Swedish band) =

Swedish metal band

- Origin: Linköping, Sweden
- Genres: Melodic black metal; melodic black-death
- Years active: 1990–present
- Labels: Necropolis, Century Media
- Members: Tomas Asklund; Henke Forss; Fredrik Söderberg; Philip Von Segebaden
- Past members: Andreas Fullmestad; Dennis Karlsson; Karsten Larsson; Stefan Lundgren; Jocke Pettersson; Lars Tängmark

Dawn is a Swedish extreme metal band from Linköping, formed by Frederik Söderberg in 1990. After disbanding for nearly a decade, they reconvened and are active today. The band has released eight recordings, including two full-length albums. The album The Fourfold Furnace was announced in early as 2003 and scheduled for release in 2008, but it never came out.

== Members ==
Current line-up

- Tomas Asklund – drums (Gorgoroth, ex-Dissection, ex-Dark Funeral)
- Henke Forss – vocals (Retaliation)
- Fredrik Söderberg – guitar (Cranium)
- Philip Von Segebaden – bass (Cranium)

Former members

- Andreas Fullmestad – guitar
- Dennis Karlsson – bass
- Karsten Larsson – drums (Mithotyn, Falconer)
- Stefan Lundgren – guitar
- Jocke Pettersson – drums
- Lars Tängmark – bass

== Discography ==
- Demo 1 (demo, 1992)
- Apparition (demo, 1993)
- Promotional Demo (demo, 1993)
- The Dark Light/The Eternal Forest (split LP with Pyghomgertum, Bellphegot Records, 1994)
- Nær Solen Gar Niþer For Evogher (Necropolis Records, 1994)
- Sorgh på Svarte Vingar Fløgh (Necropolis, 1996)
- Slaughtersun (Crown of the Triarchy) (Necropolis, 1998)
