= Nothing Remains the Same =

Studio album by Pain
- Released: 2002
- Genre: Industrial metal
- Length: 45:24
- Label: Stockholm
- Producer: Peter Tägtgren

Pain chronology
Rebirth (1999)	Nothing Remains the Same (2002)	Dancing with the Dead (2005)

Nothing Remains the Same is the third studio album by the Swedish industrial metal project Pain. It was released in 2002 via the Swedish label Stockholm Records and features the singles "Shut Your Mouth" (reached No. 14 on the Swedish single charts) and "Just Hate Me" (No. 47). The album itself reached No. 6 and remained on the Swedish album charts for nine weeks, longer than any other Pain album.

== Track listing ==
1. "It's Only Them" – 4:51
2. "Shut Your Mouth" – 3:13
3. "Close My Eyes" – 3:45
4. "Just Hate Me" – 3:55 (co-written with Per Aldeheim and Max Martin)
5. "Injected Paradise" – 5:10
6. "Eleanor Rigby" – 3:51 (The Beatles cover)
7. "Expelled" – 3:43
8. "Pull Me Under" – 4:15
9. "Save Me" – 3:37
10. "The Game" – 4:05
11. "Fade Away" – 4:59
12. "Hate Me" (bonus track) – 5:22
13. "Liar" (bonus track) – 5:18
14. "Give It Up" (bonus track) – 3:56

== Album videos ==
- The songs "Eleanor Rigby", "Just Hate Me" and "Shut Your Mouth" each have a video.
- "Eleanor Rigby" is a cover from The Beatles for which the video is a live performance in a studio.
- The video for "Just Hate Me" is about a robot that is forgotten by his maker which starts making another robot and even take parts from the first one to complete the second one.
- "Shut Your Mouth" is about an alien that visits the band's frontman, Peter Tägtgren, and tells him to convince the people of his existence; he attempts this, but fails.

== Credits ==
Pain

- Peter Tägtgren – vocals, guitar, bass & drums

Guest

- Dan Swanö – engineering

== See also ==
- Sverigetopplistan
