= Cranium (band) =

Swedish metal band

Cranium is a Swedish speed metal band formed in 1996. Cranium's music resembles German speed metal and thrash metal bands like Kreator, Sodom and Destruction.

== Members ==
Founding members

- Philip von Segebaden (bass)
- Gustaf von Segebaden (guitar)

Current members

- Philip von Segebaden a.k.a. "Grave Raper" (bass)
- Frederik Söderberg a.k.a. "Chainsaw Demon" (guitar, vocals)
- Johan Hallberg a.k.a. "Necro Nudist" (drums, vocals)

Other contributors

- Jocke Pettersson
- Fredrik Engqvist

== Discography ==
- Speed Metal Satan (EP) - 1997
- Speed Metal Slaughter - 1998
- Speed Metal Sentence - 1999
