= Batavi (album) =

Studio album by Heidevolk
- Released: March 2, 2012
- Genres: Folk metal, Viking metal, pagan metal
- Length: 39:45
- Language: Dutch
- Label: Napalm

Heidevolk chronology
Uit oude grond (2010)	Batavi (2012)	Velua (2015)

Batavi is the fourth full-length album by the Dutch pagan / Viking / folk metal band Heidevolk. It was released on March 2, 2012 through Napalm Records. The album's title and album's theme are reference to the Batavi (Germanic tribe).

Batavi is a concept album that deals with the early history of the Batavian tribe: from its beginnings to its daring revolt against one of the greatest empires the world has ever seen. Set against the backdrop of war, alliances, intrigue, and betrayal, the nine songs relate the struggles of a people needing to redefine themselves in order to survive this turbulent time.

== Track listing ==
No.	Title	Length
1.	"Een nieuw begin" ("A New Beginning")	3:57
2.	"De toekomst lonkt" ("When the Future Beckons")	4:26
3.	"Het verbond met Rome" ("The Alliance with Rome")	5:08
4.	"Wapenbroeders" ("Brothers in Arms")	4:00
5.	"In het woud gezworen" ("Sworn in the Woods")	6:39
6.	"Veleda"	2:30
7.	"Als de dood weer naar ons lacht" ("When Death Smiles at Us Again")	3:51
8.	"Einde der zege" ("The End of Victory")	4:06
9.	"Vrijgevochten" ("Fought to Freedom")	5:08
Total length:		39:45

== Personnel ==
- Joost Vellenknotscher - drums
- Rowan Roodbaert - bass
- Mark Splintervuyscht - vocals
- Reamon Bomenbreker - guitars
- Joris den Boghtdrincker - vocals
- Kevin Vruchtbaert - guitars

=== Guest musicians ===
- Irma Vos - violin
- Corinna Tenbuss - flute

=== Production ===
- Klaas Lageveen - artwork
- Awik Balaian - artwork
- Nico Van Montfort - engineering
- Jonas Kjellgren - mastering
- Peter Tägtgren - mixing
