= A Taste of Extreme Divinity =

Studio album by Hypocrisy
- Released: 23 October 2009
- Genre: Melodic death metal
- Length: 50:09
- Label: Nuclear Blast
- Producer: Peter Tägtgren

Hypocrisy chronology
Virus (2005)	A Taste of Extreme Divinity (2009)	End of Disclosure (2013)

Professional ratings
Review scores
Source	Rating
About.com	4/5 stars
AllMusic	3.5/5 stars
Blabbermouth.net	8/10
Brave Words & Bloody Knuckles	9/10

A Taste of Extreme Divinity is the eleventh studio album by Swedish melodic death metal band Hypocrisy. It was released on 23 October 2009 in Europe and on 3 November in the United States. The North American version contains three bonus tracks.

== Track listing ==
All tracks are written by Hypocrisy.

No.	Title	Length
1.	"Valley of the Damned"	4:17
2.	"Hang Him High"	4:35
3.	"Solar Empire"	5:16
4.	"Weed Out the Weak"	3:50
5.	"No Tomorrow"	4:16
6.	"Global Domination"	5:15
7.	"Taste the Extreme Divinity"	3:36
8.	"Alive"	4:22
9.	"The Quest"	5:31
10.	"Tamed (Filled with Fear)"	4:39
11.	"Sky Is Falling Down"	4:32

Bonus tracks
No.	Title	Length
12.	"The Sinner"	5:06
13.	"Taste the Extreme Divinity (2008 Demo)"	3:35
14.	"Valley of the Damned (2008 Demo)"	4:15

== Personnel ==
=== Band members ===
- Peter Tägtgren – guitars, vocals
- Mikael Hedlund – bass
- Reidar Horghagen – drums

== Charts ==
Chart performance for A Taste of Extreme Divinity
Chart (2009)	Peak position
Austrian Albums (Ö3 Austria)	66
French Albums (SNEP)	184
German Albums (Offizielle Top 100)	62
