= Dancing with the Dead =

Studio album by Pain
- Released: 21 March 2005
- Genre: Industrial metal
- Length: 47:22
- Label: Stockholm
- Producer: Peter Tägtgren

Pain chronology
Nothing Remains the Same (2002)	Dancing with the Dead (2005)	Psalms of Extinction (2007)

Dancing with the Dead is the fourth studio album by the Swedish industrial metal project Pain. It was released in March 2005 via Stockholm Records and managed to reach No. 3 on the Swedish album charts, higher than any Pain album to date. It features the single "Same Old Song", which reached No. 18 on the Swedish charts.

The album was inspired by Peter Tägtgren's mysterious collapse in a pub, during which his heart stopped beating for two minutes.

== Track listing ==
All tracks are written by Peter Tägtgren

No.	Title	Length
1.	"Don't Count Me Out"	4:39
2.	"Same Old Song"	3:58
3.	"Nothing"	4:07
4.	"Tables Have Turned"	4:22
5.	"Not Afraid to Die"	4:15
6.	"Dancing with the Dead"	4:13
7.	"Tear It Up"	3:57
8.	"Bye/Die"	3:02
9.	"My Misery"	3:56
10.	"A Good Day to Die"	3:44
11.	"Stay Away"	3:19
12.	"The Third Wave"	3:50
Total length:		47:22

2008 Russian edition bonus track
No.	Title	Length
13.	"Trapped"	3:40
Total length:		51:02

Special edition DVD
No.	Title	Length
1.	"End of the Line"
2.	"Suicide Machine"
3.	"On and On"
4.	"Shut Your Mouth"
5.	"Just Hate Me"
6.	"Same Old Song"
7.	"Behind the Music"

== Videos ==
Music videos were produced for the songs "Same Old Song", "Nothing" and "Bye/Die".

== Personnel ==
Pain

- Peter Tägtgren – vocals, guitar, bass & drums

Production

- Peter Tägtgren – producer, mixing, recording
- Björn Engelmann – mastering
- Micke Eriksson – design
- Mikeadelica – photography
