= Rebirth (Pain album) =

Studio album by Pain
- Released: 1999
- Genre: Industrial metal
- Length: 43:16
- Label: Stockholm
- Producer: Peter Tägtgren, Sweden

Pain chronology
| Pain (1996) | Rebirth (1999) | Nothing Remains the Same (2002) |

Professional ratings
Review scores
| Source | Rating |
|---|---|
| Terrorizer | 5/10 stars |
| Blabbermouth | 8/10 stars |
| Sea of Tranquility | 4/5 stars |

Rebirth is the second album by the Swedish industrial metal project Pain. It was released in 1999 via the Swedish label Stockholm Records. It was on this album, that the band's electronic sound first appeared. It includes the band's first two singles to make the Swedish single charts: "End of the Line", which peaked at No. 15, and "On and On", which peaked at No. 30. Powered by the popularity of "End of the Line" ("On and On" was not released as a single until eight months later), the album hit No. 21 on the Swedish album charts.

== Track listing ==
All songs written by Peter Tägtgren.

1. "Supersonic Bitch" – 3:44
2. "End of the Line" – 4:03
3. "Breathing In Breathing Out" – 3:35
4. "Delusions" – 4:03
5. "Suicide Machine" – 4:16
6. "Parallel to Ecstasy" – 3:58
7. "On and On" – 3:55
8. "12:42" – 1:52
9. "Crashed" – 4:01
10. "Dark Fields of Pain" – 5:00
11. "She Whipped" – 4:49
