= The Arrival (album) =

Studio album by Hypocrisy
- Released: 16 February 2004
- Recorded: August–September 2003
- Studio: The Abyss
- Genre: Melodic death metal
- Length: 40:17
- Label: Nuclear Blast
- Producers: Peter Tägtgren, Michael Hedlund

Hypocrisy chronology
Catch 22 (2002)	The Arrival (2004)	Virus (2005)

Professional ratings
Review scores
Source	Rating
AllMusic	3/5 stars
Brave Words & Bloody Knuckles	7.5/10
Metal.de	8/10
Metal Storm	(9/10)

The Arrival is the ninth studio album by Swedish melodic death metal band Hypocrisy, released on 16 February 2004. It is the last album with their longtime drummer Lars Szöke. The song "Eraser" was made into a music video. The album was also released in a strictly limited boxset, containing "The Arrival", eight postcards and a bonus DVD of Hypocrisy's complete live show at Summer Breeze Festival in 2002.

Dan Swanö (tracks 1, 3, 4, 7–9) and Silenoz (track 5) wrote lyrics for the album. The band wrote lyrics for track 2 and Tägtgren also wrote lyrics for tracks 4–6.

== Track listing ==
All music is composed by Hypocrisy.

No.	Title	Lyrics	Length
1.	"Born Dead Buried Alive"	Dan Swanö	4:10
2.	"Eraser"		4:27
3.	"Stillborn"	Dan Swanö	3:24
4.	"Slave to the Parasites"	Dan Swanö, Peter Tägtgren	5:02
5.	"New World"	Silenoz, Peter Tägtgren	4:11
6.	"The Abyss"		4:24
7.	"Dead Sky Dawning"	Dan Swanö	4:28
8.	"The Departure"	Dan Swanö	5:18
9.	"War Within"	Dan Swanö	4:53

== Personnel ==
=== Hypocrisy ===
- Peter Tägtgren − vocals, guitar; keyboards, mixing
- Mikael Hedlund − bass; fretless bass on intro of "Eraser"
- Lars Szöke − drums

=== Production ===
- Björn Engelmann − mastering

== Charts ==
Chart performance for The Arrival
Chart (2004)	Peak position
Austrian Albums (Ö3 Austria)	71
