= Heaven Shall Burn... When We Are Gathered =

Studio album by Marduk
- Released: July 1, 1996
- Recorded: January 1996
- Studio: The Abyss, Pärlby, Sweden
- Genre: Black metal
- Length: 35:42
- Label: Osmose Productions
- Producer: Marduk and Peter Tägtgren

Marduk chronology
Opus Nocturne (1994)	Heaven Shall Burn... When We Are Gathered (1996)	Glorification (1996)

2006 edition cover
- Digipak cover

Professional ratings
Review scores
Source	Rating
About.com	4.5/5 stars
AllMusic	3.5/5 stars
Chronicles of Chaos	9/10
Collector's Guide to Heavy Metal	7/10
Metal Storm	8.8/10

Heaven Shall Burn... When We Are Gathered is the fourth studio album by Swedish black metal band Marduk. It was recorded and mixed at The Abyss in January 1996 and released on July 1 that year by Osmose Productions. It was re-released in digipak format with bonus tracks on June 27, 2006 by Regain Records. Heaven Shall Burn... When We Are Gathered is the first Marduk album to feature Legion, formerly of Ophthalamia, on vocals and Peter Tägtgren as producer. This album marked a shift in style for what Marduk are commonly known for: hyper-blast blast beats and furious drum work, sheer brutality over melody (compared to previous releases), and raw vocals.

The music for "Glorification of the Black God" is an adaptation of Modest Mussorgsky's "Night on Bald Mountain". The first guitar riff is from a score in the 1939 version of The Wizard of Oz. Furthermore, the lyrics of the song are clearly inspired by "Bald Mountain's" basic theme (a witches' Sabbath on St. John's Night). The title of the album is a reference to the Bathory song "Dies Irae" from Blood Fire Death. It has also inspired the name of German melodic death metal/metalcore band Heaven Shall Burn.

== Track listing ==
All tracks are written by Marduk, except "Darkness It Shall Be" and "Dracul Va Domni Din Nou in Transilvania" with lyrics by Tony Särkkä.

No.	Title	Length
1.	"Summon the Darkness" (instrumental)	0:21
2.	"Beyond the Grace of God"	5:17
3.	"Infernal Eternal"	4:41
4.	"Glorification of the Black God"	4:52
5.	"Darkness It Shall Be"	4:40
6.	"The Black Tormentor of Satan"	4:15
7.	"Dracul Va Domni Din Nou in Transilvania" (The Devil Will Reign Again in Transylvania)	5:39
8.	"Legion"	5:55

2006 edition bonus tracks
No.	Title	Length
9.	"Beyond the Grace of God" (Demo-Version)	5:21
10.	"Glorification" (Demo-Version)	4:07
11.	"Black Tormentor/Shadow of Our Infernal King" (Demo-Version)	4:20
12.	"Infernal Eternal/Towards the Land of the Damned" (Demo-Version)	4:36

== Personnel ==
Marduk

- Legion – vocals
- Morgan Steinmeyer Håkansson – guitar
- B. War – bass
- Fredrik Andersson – drums

Production

- Peter Tägtgren – producer, engineer, mixing
