= Abducted (album) =

Studio album by Hypocrisy
- Released: 13 February 1996
- Recorded: March–October 1995, Abyss Studio, Sweden
- Genre: Melodic death metal
- Length: 47:13
- Label: Nuclear Blast
- Producer: Peter Tägtgren

Hypocrisy chronology
The Fourth Dimension (1994)	Abducted (1996)	The Final Chapter (1997)

Professional ratings
Review scores
Source	Rating
AllMusic	4/5 stars
metal.de	9/10
Chronicles of Chaos	8/10
Rock Hard	8.5/10

Abducted is the fourth studio album by Swedish melodic death metal band Hypocrisy, released in 1996. It saw the band move further into a more melodic direction than their earlier releases. The album was also released as a limited edition digipak, not to be confused with the non-limited edition digipak re-release. The album was since reissued alongside the band's earlier death metal albums, resulting in positive feedback.

The samples in the intro, "The Gathering", are taken from the so-called Halt Tape, which was allegedly recorded during the Rendlesham Forest incident on 26 December 1980.

== Track listing ==
All tracks are written by Hypocrisy.

No.	Title	Length
1.	"The Gathering"	1:09
2.	"Roswell 47"	3:56
3.	"Killing Art"	2:55
4.	"The Arrival of the Demons (Part 2)"	3:17
5.	"Buried"	3:11
6.	"Abducted"	2:50
7.	"Paradox"	4:32
8.	"Point of No Return"	3:54
9.	"When the Candle Fades"	5:30
10.	"Carved Up"	3:28
11.	"Reflections"	2:37
12.	"Slippin' Away"	5:13
13.	"Drained"	4:28

Japanese edition bonus tracks
No.	Title	Length
14.	"Request Denied"
15.	"Strange Ways" (Kiss cover)

Digipak re-release live bonus tracks
No.	Title	Length
14.	"Fractured Millennium"	5:28
15.	"Legions Descend"	4:07
16.	"Fire in the Sky"	5:13
17.	"Elastic Inverted Visions"	5:47

This digipack re-release features four live tracks recorded at the Nuclear Blast Festival on 25 September 2000.

== Credits ==
=== Band members ===
- Mikael Hedlund − bass guitar
- Lars Szöke − drums
- Peter Tägtgren − vocals, electric guitars, keyboards

=== Production ===
- Produced and mixed by Peter Tägtgren
- Recorded and mixed in Abyss Studio, Sweden, March–October 1995
- Engineered by Hypocrisy
- Mastered by Peter In De Betou at Cuttingroom, Solna, Sweden
- Photo, art and design by P Grøn, Sweden

== Charts ==
Chart performance for Hypocrisy
Chart (2005)	Peak position
German Albums (Offizielle Top 100)	86
