= Peter Tägtgren =

Swedish musician and record producer

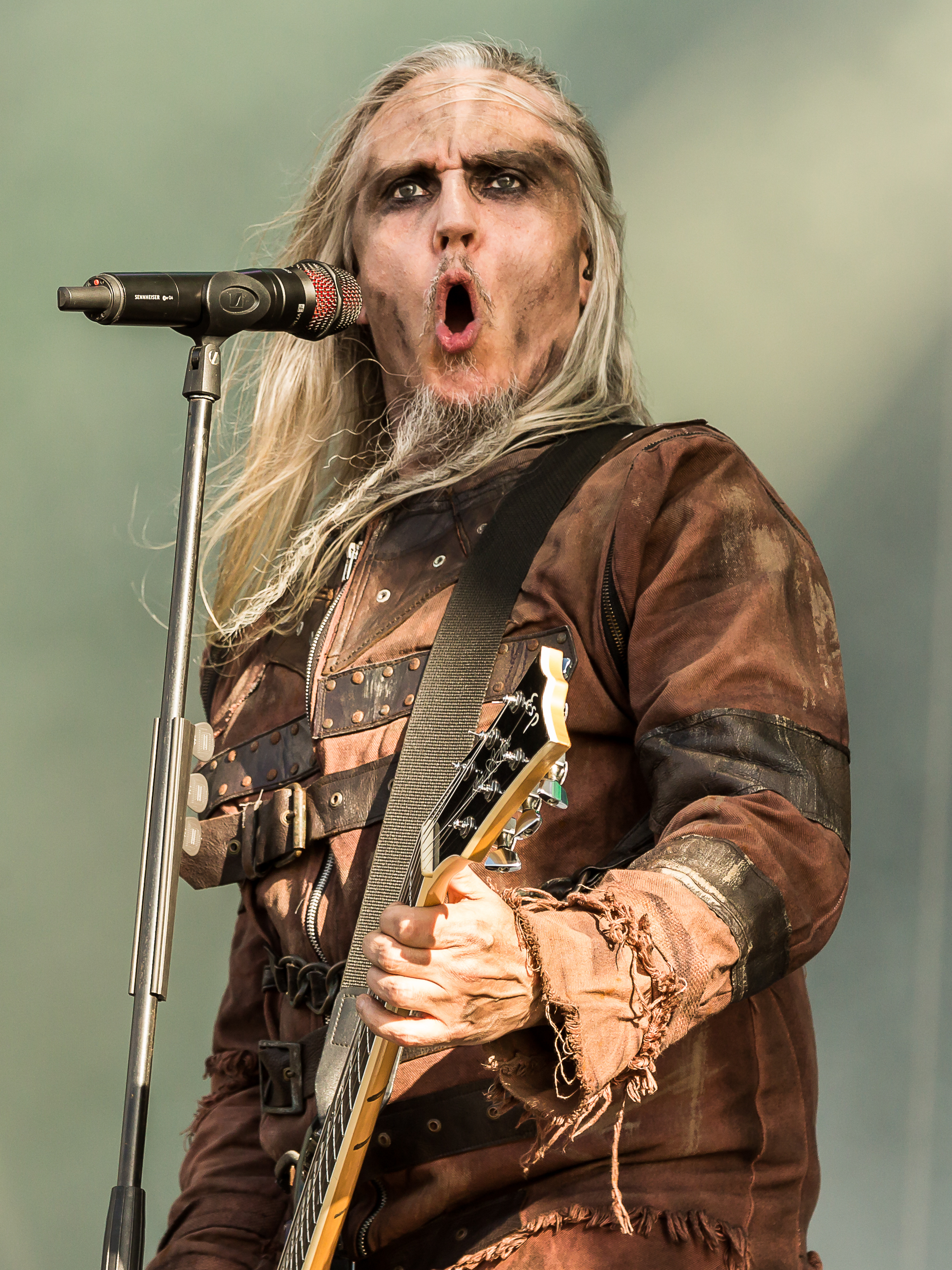
- Tägtgren performing in 2024

Background information
- Born: Alf Peter Tägtgren; 3 June 1970 (age 55); Grangärde, Sweden
- Genres: Death metal; melodic death metal; industrial metal; black metal
- Occupations: Musician; record producer; songwriter
- Instruments: Vocals; guitars; drums; bass; keyboards
- Years active: 1990–present
- Member of: Hypocrisy; Pain
- Formerly of: Bloodbath; Lock Up; The Abyss; War; Lindemann

Alf Peter Tägtgren (born 3 June 1970) is a Swedish musician, record producer and songwriter. He is the owner of The Abyss recording studio and has produced numerous records for heavy metal and extreme metal acts.

Tägtgren is the founder, main songwriter, lead vocalist, and guitarist of death metal band Hypocrisy as well as the industrial metal band Pain in which he is the only member.

== Career ==
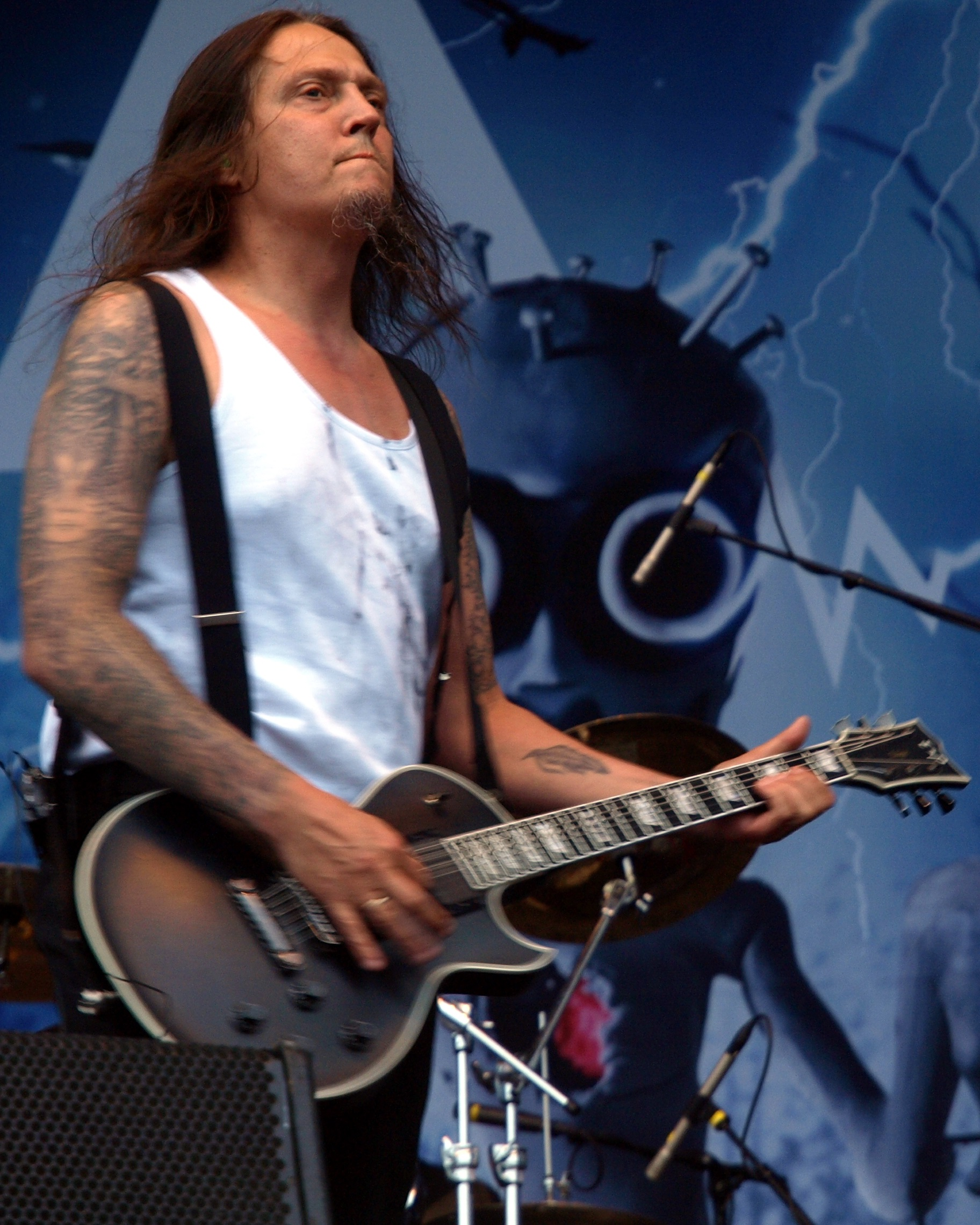
Tägtgren with Pain in 2011

Tägtgren started playing drums at the age of nine and later learned to play guitar, bass and keyboard.

After Tägtgren's first band Conquest disbanded, he emigrated to the United States. There, he became part of the death metal scene after participating in practice sessions with Malevolent Creation's guitarist, Phil Fasciana.

Tägtgren moved back to Sweden and formed the band Hypocrisy. He then signed a recording contract with the independent record label Nuclear Blast.

Although Hypocrisy is his main focus, he has also worked on many other Swedish metal projects. These include Pain (industrial metal), for which he performs all instruments and vocals and composes all songs, Lock Up (grindcore/death metal), in which he was the vocalist, The Abyss (black metal), where he performed drums, bass and vocals, War (black metal), where he performed drums. He also appeared as a live guitarist for the bands Marduk and E-Type, and on the Bloodbath album Nightmares Made Flesh as a vocalist.

Additionally, Tägtgren is a record producer, running The Abyss studio where he mixes and edits works of other Scandinavian bands including Sabaton, Dimmu Borgir, Immortal, Amon Amarth, Skyfire, Finnish bands Children of Bodom and Amorphis, and Swiss band Celtic Frost.

In 2015, he co-founded the industrial metal band Lindemann with Rammstein lead singer Till Lindemann.

In a 2017 interview with Noizr Zine, Tägtgren reported that he's working on new material together with his son Sebastian:

"And now, since January, we are sitting in the studio, writing music, and we have like 20 songs or something like that. We don't know what it is for. It's not for Hypocrisy, it's not for Pain, it's for something else. We don't know yet, we're just writing because we really have a good time writing."

In November 2020, Tägtgren left the musical project Lindemann.

== Personal life ==
A year before the recording of his album Dancing with the Dead (2005), Tägtgren's heart stopped beating for two minutes. This event inspired him to write the album.

Tägtgren is known as "Mayor of Pärlby" as he owns the small village in which he resides (population c. 120 people). He has been married twice; however, neither marriage lasted. He was quoted as saying, "And my passion for music? It's hard to be in two places at the same time, and women come and women go. Music stays."

== Discography and guest appearances ==
- Hypocrisy – (vocals, guitars, lyrics, production) – all releases
- Pain – (all instruments, vocals, lyrics, production) – all releases
- Lindemann – (all instruments, production) – all releases
- Electric Hellfire Club (band) – (guest vocals on song Hypochristian)
- The Abyss – The Other Side – (vocals, drums, bass) – 1995
- The Abyss – Summon the Beast – (vocals, drums, bass) – 1996
- Algaion – Vox Clamentis – (drums) – 1996
- Edge of Sanity – Infernal – (lead guitar on "The Bleakness of It All") – 1997
- Therion – A'arab Zaraq – Lucid Dreaming – (lead guitar on "Under Jolly Roger") – 1997
- Lock Up – Pleasures Pave Sewers – (vocals) – 1999
- Bloodbath – Nightmares Made Flesh – (vocals) – 2004
- Kataklysm – Serenity in Fire – (guest vocals on "For All Our Sins") – 2004
- Destruction – Inventor of Evil – (guest vocals on "The Alliance of Hellhoundz") – 2005
- Nuclear Blast All-Stars – Out of the Dark – (guest vocals on "Schizo") – 2007
- Sonic Syndicate – We Rule the Night – (lyrics and co-wrote music with Jonas Kjellgren on "Leave Me Alone") – 2010
- Exodus – Exhibit B: The Human Condition – (backing vocals on "The Sun Is My Destroyer") – 2010
- The Unguided – Nightmareland EP – (guest vocals on "Pathfinder") – 2011
- Turmion Kätilöt – Perstechnique – (guest vocals on "Grand Ball") – 2011
- Sabaton – Carolus Rex – (guest vocals on "Gott mit Uns" and "Twilight of the Thunder God", guitar solo on "Twilight of the Thunder God") – 2012
- Sabaton – The Last Stand – (production) – 2016
- Immortal – Northern Chaos Gods – (production, bass (session)) – 2018

=== Production credits ===
- Hypocrisy – The Fourth Dimension (1994)
- Amon Amarth – Sorrow Throughout the Nine Worlds (1995)
- The Abyss – The Other Side (1995)
- Naglfar – Vittra (1995)
- Death Organ – 9 to 5 (1995)
- Dark Funeral – The Secrets of the Black Arts (1996)
- Fleshcrawl – Bloodsoul (1996)
- Hypocrisy – Abducted (1996)
- The Abyss – Summon the Beast (1996)
- Setherial – Nord (1996)
- Marduk – Heaven Shall Burn... When We Are Gathered (1996)
- Marduk – Glorification (1996)
- Pain – Pain (1997)
- Dimmu Borgir – Enthrone Darkness Triumphant (1997)
- Marduk – Live in Germania (1997)
- Fleshcrawl – Bloodred Massacre (1997)
- Hypocrisy – The Final Chapter (1997)
- Abruptum – Vi Sonus Veris Nigrae Malitiaes (1997)
- Therion – A'arab Zaraq – Lucid Dreaming (1997)
- Dark Funeral – Vobiscum Satanas (1998)
- Amon Amarth – Once Sent from the Golden Hall (1998)
- Dimmu Borgir – Godless Savage Garden (1998)
- Marduk – Nightwing (1998)
- Dispatched – Promised Land (1998)
- Love Like Blood – Snakekiller (1998)
- Love Like Blood – The Love Like Blood E.P. (1998)
- Enslaved – Blodhemn (1998)
- Raise Hell – Holy Target (1998)
- Thyrfing – Valdr Galga (1999)
- Hypocrisy – Hypocrisy (1999)
- Immortal – At the Heart of Winter (1999)
- Dimmu Borgir – Spiritual Black Dimensions (1999)
- Marduk – Panzer Division Marduk (1999)
- PAIN – Rebirth (1999)
- Amon Amarth – The Avenger (1999)
- Borknagar – Quintessence (2000)
- Children of Bodom – Follow the Reaper (2000)
- Dark Funeral – Teach Children to Worship Satan (2000)
- Destruction – All Hell Breaks Loose (2000)
- Dispatched – Motherwar (2000)
- Dark Funeral – In the Sign... (2000)
- Old Man's Child – Revelation 666 - The Curse of Damnation (2000)
- Hypocrisy – Into the Abyss (2000)
- Immortal – Damned in Black (2000)
- Rotting Christ – Khronos (2000)
- Neglected Fields – Mephisto Lettonica (2000)
- Enslaved – Mardraum – Beyond the Within (2000)
- Gardenian – Sindustries (2000)
- Susperia – Predominance (2001)
- Marduk – La Grande Danse Macabre (2001)
- Amon Amarth – The Crusher (2001)
- Destruction – The Antichrist (2001)
- Dark Funeral – Diabolis Interium (2001)
- Immortal – Sons of Northern Darkness (2002)
- Hypocrisy – Catch 22 (2002)
- Susperia – Vindication (2002)
- PAIN – Nothing Remains the Same (2002)
- Shining – Angst, självdestruktivitetens emissarie (2002)
- Marduk – World Funeral (2003)
- Grimfist – Ghouls of Grandeur (2003)
- Forgotten Tomb – Springtime Depression (2003)
- Hypocrisy – The Arrival (2004)
- Maryslim – Split Vision (2004)
- Grave – Fiendish Regression (2004)
- PAIN – Dancing with the Dead (2005)
- Destruction – Inventor of Evil (2005)
- Hypocrisy – Virus (2005)
- Dimmu Borgir – Stormblåst MMV (2005)
- Celtic Frost – Monotheist (2006)
- Grave – As Rapture Comes (2006)
- Noctiferia – Slovenska Morbida (2006)
- PAIN – Psalms of Extinction (2007)
- Maryslim – A Perfect Mess (2007)
- Children of Bodom – Blooddrunk (2008)
- Hypocrisy – Catch 22 V2.0.08 (2008)
- PAIN – Cynic Paradise (2008)
- Sanctification – Black Reign (2008)
- Sabaton – The Art of War (2008)
- Tarja – The Seer (EP) (2008)
- Immortal – All Shall Fall (2009)
- Hypocrisy – A Taste of Extreme Divinity (2009)
- Dark Funeral – Angelus Exuro pro Eternus (2009)
- Sabaton – Coat of Arms (2010)
- Overkill – Ironbound (2010)
- Noctiferia – Death Culture (2010)
- Immortal – The Seventh Date of Blashyrkh (2010)
- Abigail Williams – In the Absence of Light (2011)
- Belphegor – Blood Magick Necromance (2011)
- Legion of the Damned – Descent into Chaos (2011)
- Kampfar – Mare (2011)
- The Unguided – Nightmareland (EP) (2011)
- Loudblast – Frozen Moments Between Life And Death (2011)
- Septicflesh – The Great Mass (2011)
- PAIN – You Only Live Twice (2011)
- Heidevolk – Batavi (2012)
- Carnalation – Deathmask (2012)
- Essence – Last Night Of Solace (2012)
- Sabaton – Carolus Rex (2012)
- Amorphis – Circle (2013)
- Children Of Bodom – Halo of Blood (2013)
- Hypocrisy – End of Disclosure (2013)
- Sabaton – Heroes (2014)
- Carach Angren – This Is No Fairytale (2015)
- Lindemann – Skills in Pills (2015)
- Discharge - End Of Days (2016)
- Sabaton – The Last Stand (2016)
- PAIN – Coming Home (2016)
- Carach Angren – Dance and Laugh Amongst the Rotten (2017)
- Immortal – Northern Chaos Gods (2018)
- Lindemann - F&M (2019)
- Hypocrisy – Worship (2021)
