= Hypocrisy (band) =

Swedish melodic death metal band

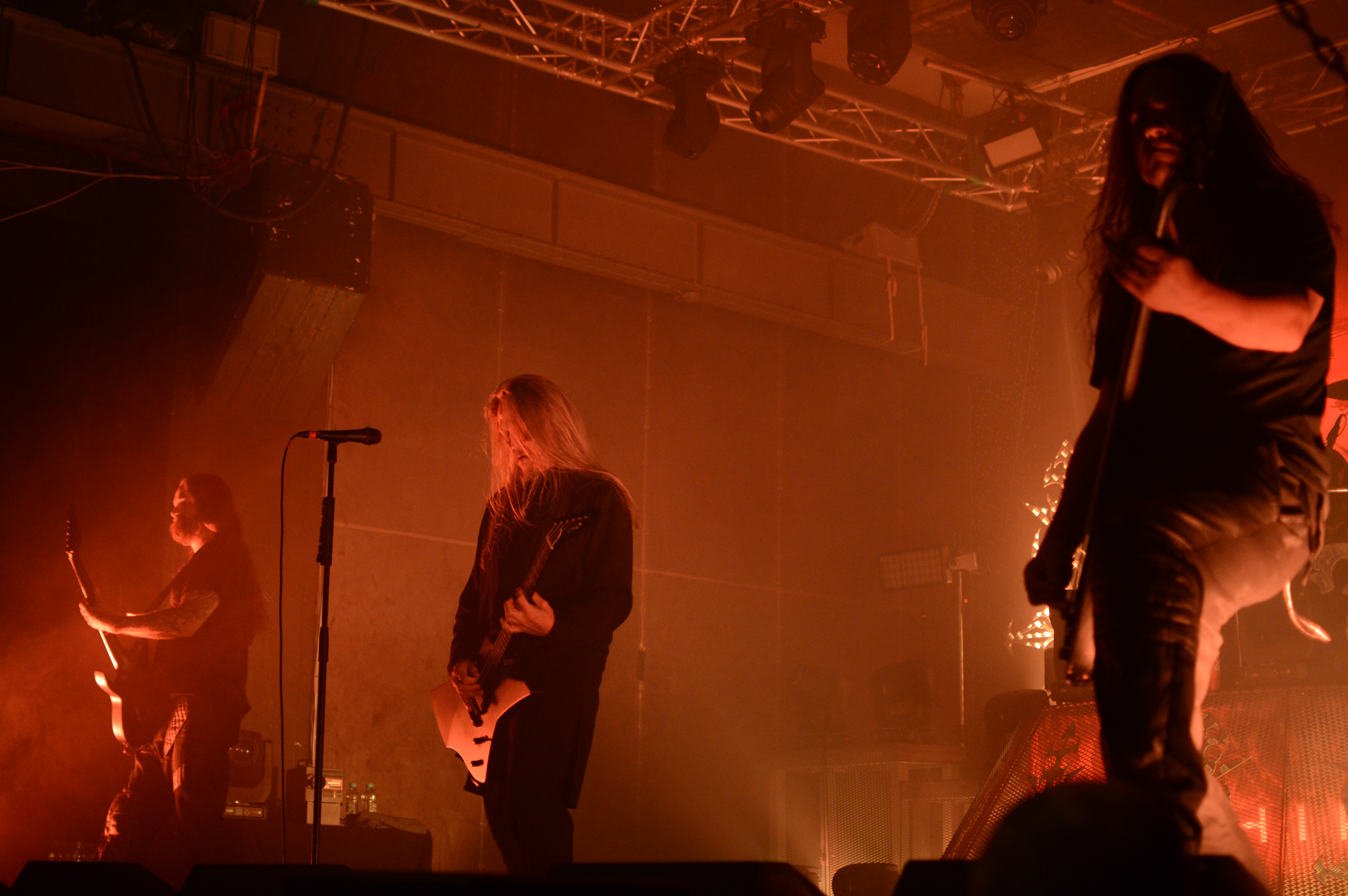
- Hypocrisy in 2022

Background information
- Origin: Ludvika, Sweden
- Genres: Melodic death metal; death metal (early)
- Years active: 1991–present
- Label: Nuclear Blast
- Members: Peter Tägtgren; Mikael Hedlund; Tomas Elofsson; Henrik Axelsson
- Past members: Reidar "Horgh" Horghagen; Masse Broberg; Jonas Österberg; Lars Szöke; Mathias Kamijo; Andreas Holma
- Website: hypocrisyband.com

Hypocrisy is a Swedish melodic death metal band formed in October 1991 in Ludvika by Peter Tägtgren. The band has released thirteen studio albums.

== History ==
After three years in Fort Lauderdale, Florida, in 1990, founder Peter Tägtgren returned to Sweden to form a band. Critics noted that Hypocrisy's early releases were well-executed but not particularly innovative death metal. That criticism waned as the band cultivated a distinctive sound and employed introspective lyrics. Later releases have an atmospheric sound and lyrics that explore aliens and abductions.

Tägtgren's experience as a producer may have led to the band's change in musical direction. He is closely involved with many other bands while producing their albums.

They appeared at the Wacken Open Air music festival in 1998, 2002, 2004 and 2022.

After twice cancelling a U.S. tour in 2009, Hypocrisy confirmed a North American tour for 2010. Scar Symmetry, Hate, Blackguard and Swashbuckle joined them on the "Long Time, No Death" tour. From January to March 2010, they toured Germany, Eastern Europe and Scandinavia, finishing in Moscow. Their North American tour took place in May 2010.

On 14 October 2011, Hypocrisy released the DVD Hell Over Sofia - 20 Years of Chaos and Confusion. It contains a full concert from the "Long Time, No Death" tour. The DVD contains a one and a half-hour documentary. On 10 November 2011, Mikael Hedlund announced writing material for a new studio album during an interview with Metal Shock Finland's chief editor, Mohsen Fayyazi. Hedlund told Metal Shock Finland:

It's too early to say what it's going to sounds like, but all I can say is that it's not gonna be any change of style. It will be a classic HYPOCRISY album without [any] compromises. We already got some material and we're really looking forward to enter the studio again. We don't know yet when it will [be], but hopefully after the summer 2012. Nothing is confirmed yet. We're doing the Metalfest tour [of Europe] in May/June plus some other festivals. That's the plans at the moment.

In early 2012, the band began to writing a follow-up to A Taste of Extreme Divinity. On 21 December 2012 Hypocrisy announced that the title of the upcoming album would be End of Disclosure. It was released on 22 March 2013.

Hypocrisy's thirteenth studio album, and first in eight years, Worship, was released on 26 November 2021. The album was preceded by a music video for first single "Chemical Whore". Loudwire elected it the 32nd best metal song of 2021.

On 5 April 2022, via the band's official Facebook page, the band announced Horgh's departure. He was replaced a week later with Henrik Axelsson of The Crown.

== Musical style and lyrical themes ==
Musically, the band started off with a traditional death metal sound on their early albums, but soon turned into a melodic death metal band. Their early lyrics – written by original vocalist Masse Broberg – dealt with anti-Christian themes and Satanism. The band later focused on themes such as the paranormal and extraterrestrials. Their tenth album, Virus, contains themes more typical of death metal such as violence, the horrors of reality, insanity, torture, war, drug addiction, and emotional strife. Their twelfth album, End of Disclosure, explores conspiracy-related themes, including secret organizations, government secrecy, surveillance, and extraterrestrial disclosure. Worship, their latest album to date, combines the conspiracy and extraterrestrial themes of End of Disclosure with the darker human-centered themes of Virus, including social decay, addiction, manipulation, and emotional suffering.

== Band members ==
Hypocrisy live at Wacken Open Air 2022

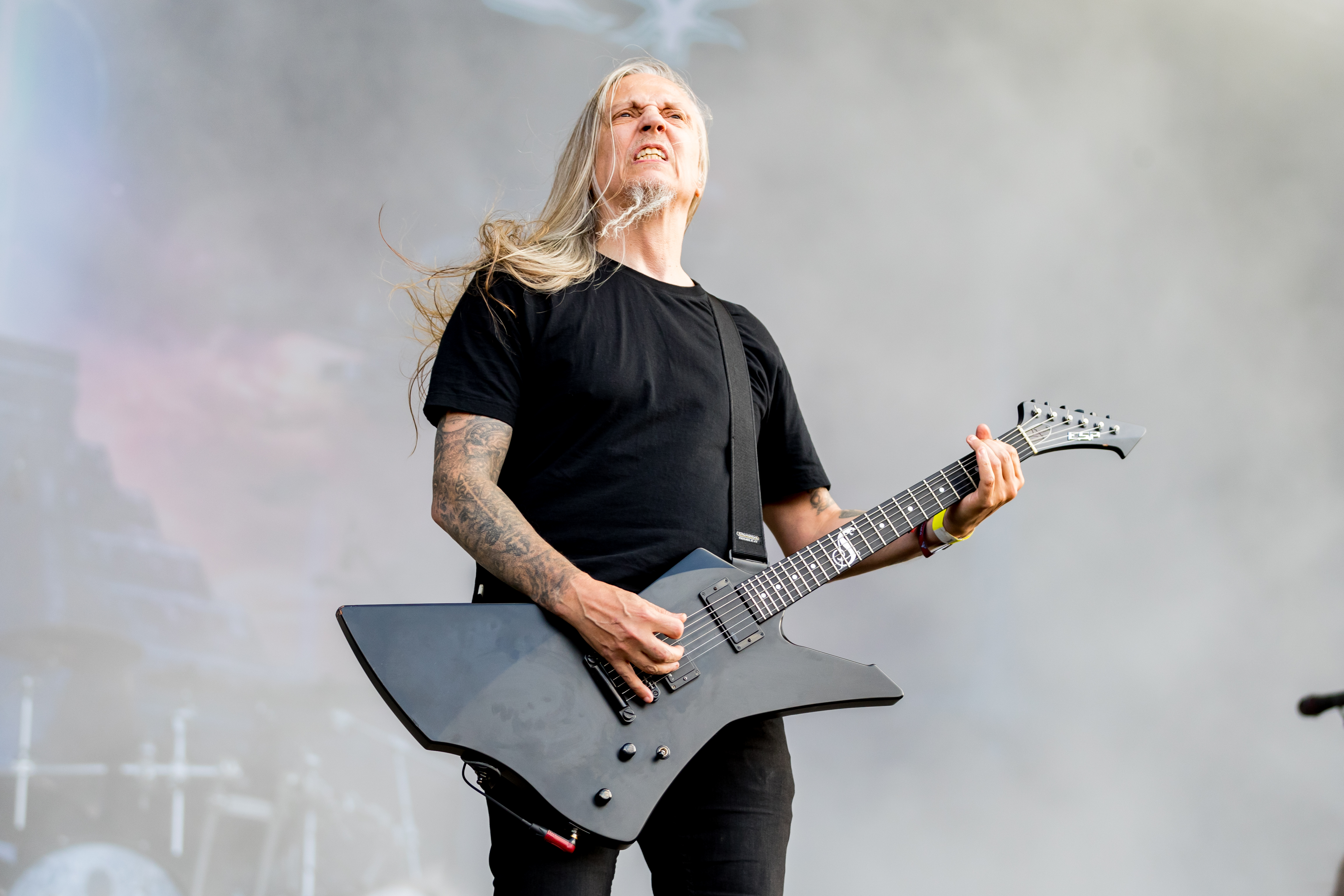
Peter Tägtgren

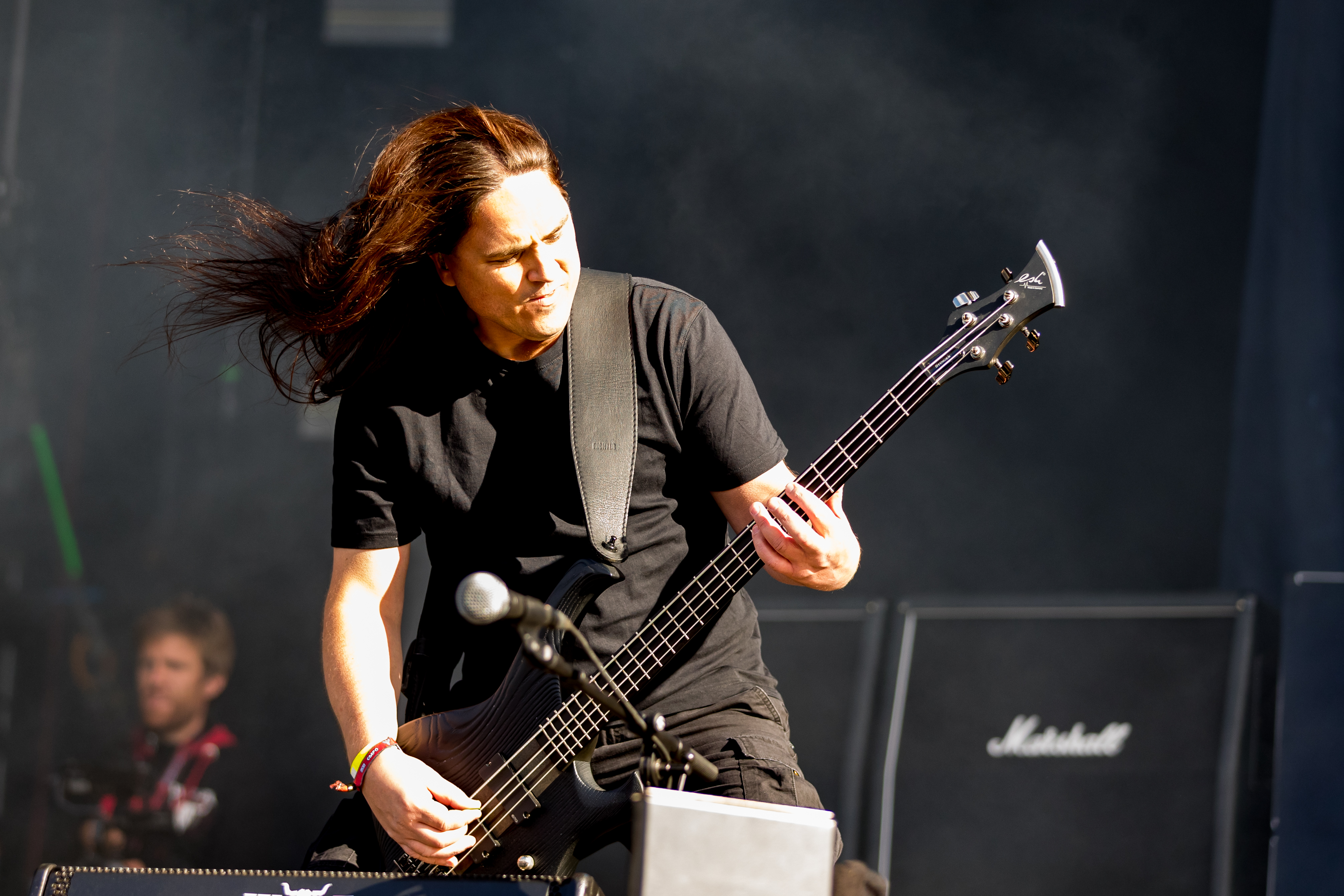
Mikael Hedlund

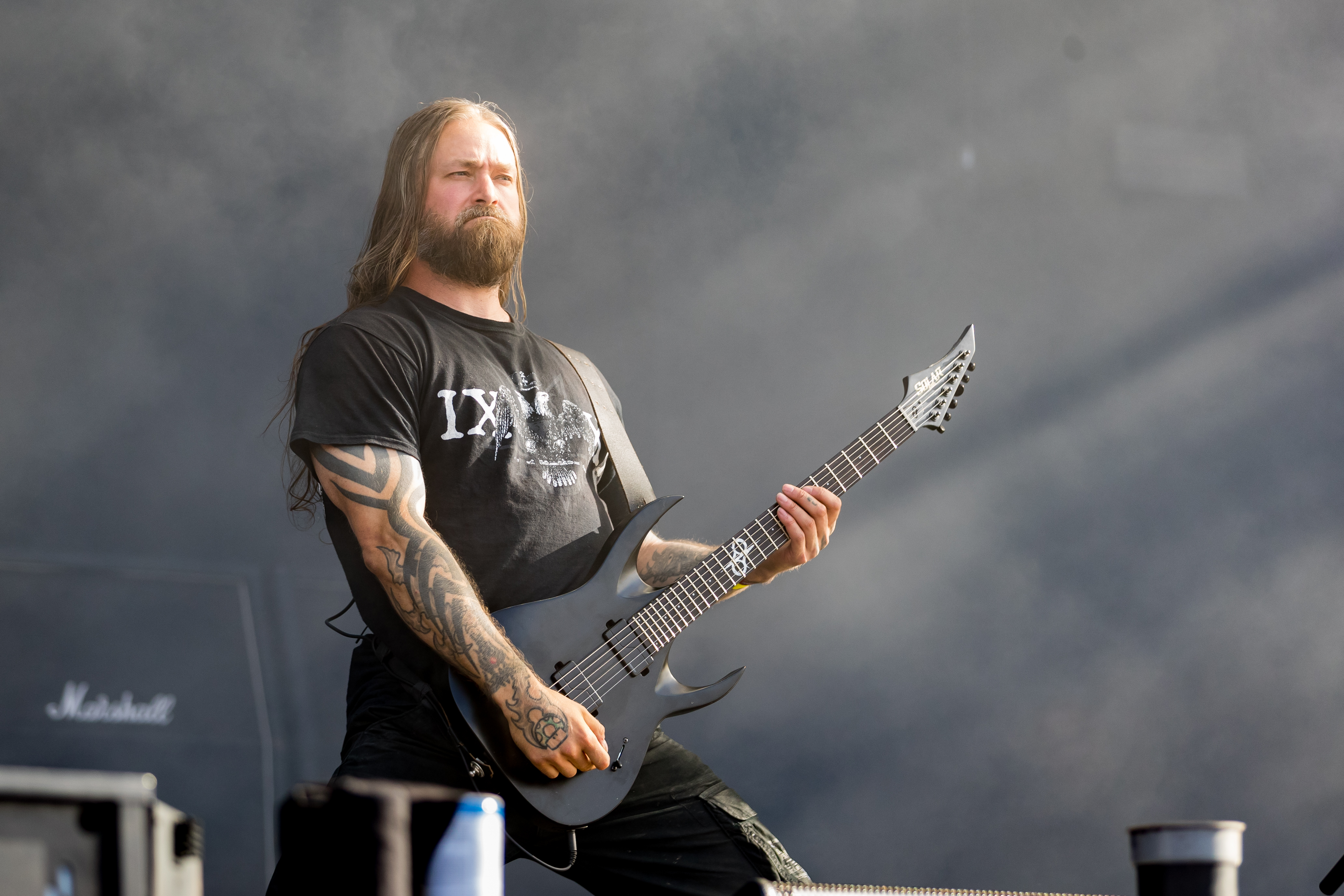
Tomas Elofsson

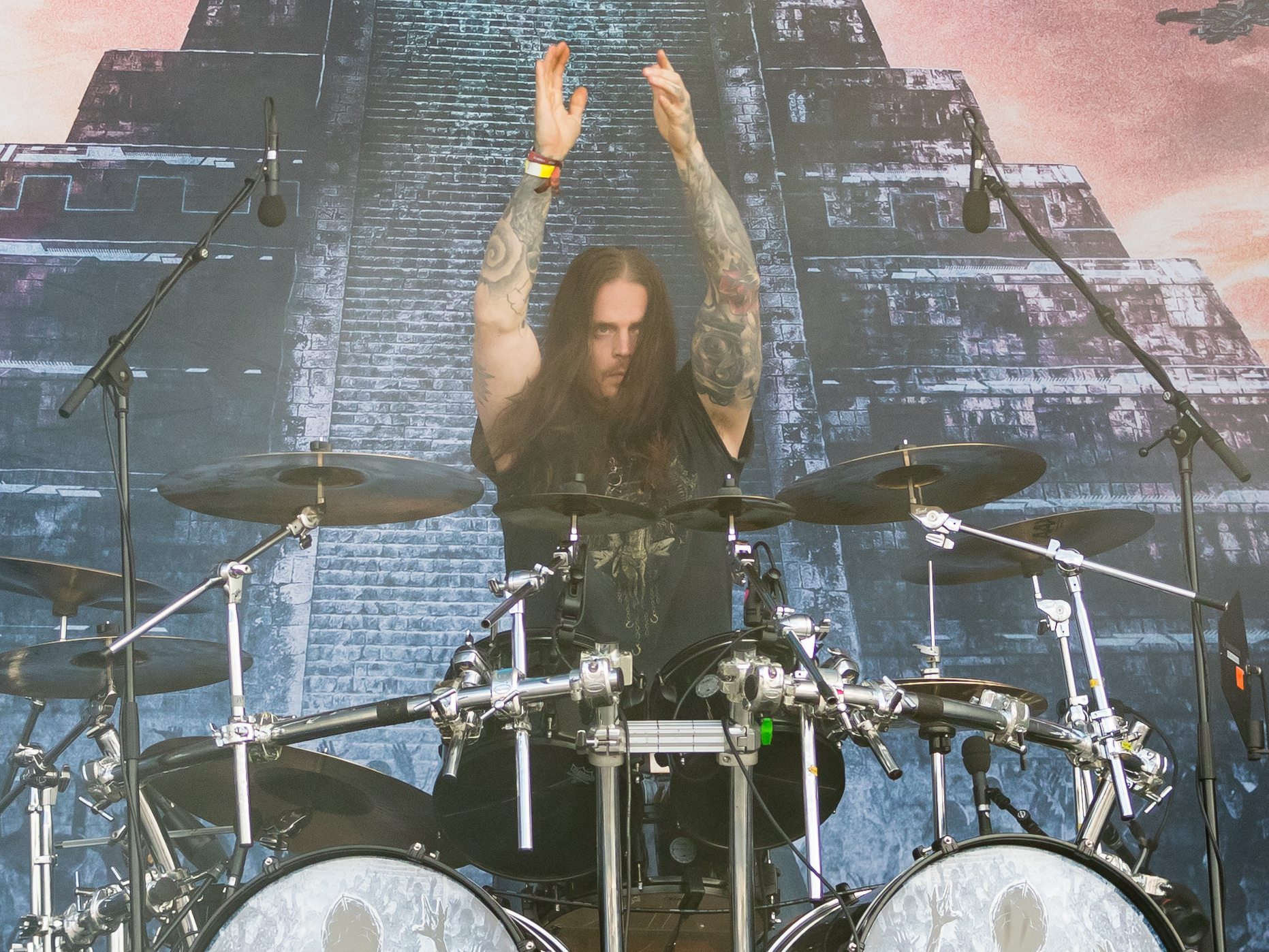
Henrik Axelsson

Current

- Peter Tägtgren – guitars, keyboards (1991–present), vocals (1993–present)
- Mikael Hedlund – bass (1991–present)
- Tomas Elofsson – guitars (2010–present)
- Henrik Axelsson – drums (2022–present)

Former

- Magnus "Masse" Broberg – vocals (1992–1993)
- Lars Szöke – drums (1992–2004)
- Jonas Österberg – guitars (1992)
- Mathias Kamijo – guitars (1995–2000)
- Horgh – drums (2004–2022)
- Andreas Holma – guitars (2002–2006)

Live

- Klas Ideberg – guitars (2006)

Timeline

== Discography ==
=== Studio albums ===
Title	Album details	Peak chart positions							Sales
Title	Album details	GER	SWE	AUT	FRA	SWI	FIN	US Heat	Sales
Penetralia	Released: 5 October 1992; Label: Nuclear Blast; Formats: CD, CS, LP, DL	—	—	—	—	—	—	—	
Osculum Obscenum	Released: 12 October 1993; Label: Nuclear Blast; Formats: CD, CS, LP, DL	—	—	—	—	—	—	—	
The Fourth Dimension	Released: 25 October 1994; Label: Nuclear Blast; Formats: CD, CS, LP, DL	66	—	—	—	—	—	—	
Abducted	Released: 13 February 1996; Label: Nuclear Blast; Formats: CD, CS, LP, DL	86	—	—	—	—	—	—	
The Final Chapter	Released: 11 November 1997; Label: Nuclear Blast; Formats: CD, CS, LP, DL	76	—	—	—	—	—	—	
Hypocrisy	Released: 22 June 1999; Label: Nuclear Blast; Formats: CD, CS, LP, DL	85	—	—	—	—	—	—	
Into the Abyss	Released: 22 May 2000; Label: Nuclear Blast; Formats: CD, CS, LP, DL	64	—	—	—	—	—	—	
Catch 22	Released: 19 March 2002; Label: Nuclear Blast; Formats: CD, CS, LP, DL	78	—	—	—	—	—	—	
The Arrival	Released: 16 February 2004; Label: Nuclear Blast; Formats: CD, CD+DVD, LP, DL	—	—	71	—	—	—	—	
Virus	Released: 5 September 2005; Label: Nuclear Blast; Formats: CD, CD+DVD, LP, DL	76	58	75	—	—	—	—	
A Taste of Extreme Divinity	Released: 23 October 2009; Label: Nuclear Blast; Formats: CD, LP, DL	62	—	66	184	—	—	23	US: 1,400+
End of Disclosure	Released: 22 March 2013; Label: Nuclear Blast; Formats: CD, LP, DL	35	29	56	151	53	30	12	US: 3,000+
Worship	Released: 26 November 2021; Label: Nuclear Blast; Formats: CD, LP, DL	16	—	—	—	16	12	—	
"—" denotes a recording that did not chart or was not released in that territory.

=== EPs ===
Title	EP details
Pleasure of Molestation	Released: 13 March 1993; Label: Relapse Records; Formats: CD
Inferior Devoties	Released: 1994; Label: Nuclear Blast; Formats: CD, DL
Maximum Abduction	Released: 25 February 1996; Label: Nuclear Blast; Formats: CD
Too Drunk to Fuck	Released: 2 August 2013; Label: Nuclear Blast; Formats: LP

=== Compilation albums ===
Title	Album details
10 Years of Chaos and Confusion	Released: 21 August 2001; Label: Nuclear Blast; Formats: CD

=== Live albums ===
Title	Album details
Hypocrisy Destroys Wacken	Released: 2 March 1999; Label: Nuclear Blast; Formats: CD
Hell Over Sofia - 20 Years of Chaos and Confusion	Released: 14 October 2011; Label: Nuclear Blast; Formats: 2CD+DVD

=== Video albums ===
Title	Video details	Peak chart positions
Title	Video details	SWE
Hypocrisy Destroys Wacken	Released: 14 September 1999; Label: Nuclear Blast; Formats: VHS	—
Live & Clips	Released: 17 April 2001; Label: Nuclear Blast; Formats: DVD	—
Hell over Sofia - 20 Years of Chaos and Confusion	Released: 14 October 2011; Label: Nuclear Blast; Formats: DVD	15
"—" denotes a recording that did not chart or was not released in that territory.

=== Music videos ===
Year	Title	Directed	Album
1992	"Left to Rot"	—	Penetralia
1992	"Impotent God"	—	Penetralia
1993	"Pleasure of Molestation"	—	Osculum Obscenum
1993	"Inferior Devoties"	—	Osculum Obscenum
1996	"Roswell 47"	—	Abducted
1997	"The Final Chapter"	—	The Final Chapter
2004	"Eraser"	—	The Arrival
2005	"Scrutinized"	Mike Adelica	Virus
2010	"Weed Out the Weak"	Denis Goria	A Taste of Extreme Divinity
2013	"End of Disclosure"	—	End of Disclosure
2013	"Tales of Thy Spineless"	—	End of Disclosure
2021	"Children of the Gray"	—	Worship
