= The Call of the Wintermoon =

Song by Immortal

from the album Diabolical Fullmoon Mysticism
- Released: 1 July 1992
- Recorded: April 1992
- Genre: Black metal
- Length: 5:40
- Label: Osmose Productions
- Composers: Abbath Doom Occulta; Demonaz Doom Occulta
- Lyricist: Demonaz Doom Occulta
- Producer: Immortal

"The Call of the Wintermoon" is a song by the black metal band Immortal from the album Diabolical Fullmoon Mysticism. The song's music video shows members of the band run amok in a forest and through the site of the ancient ruins of Lyse Abbey, wearing corpse paint and other articles such as a wizard costume, brandishing various weapons and, among other things, breathing fire. Being the drummer at time of shootings, Kolgrim appears in the music video, despite having nothing to do with the studio track, the drums having been recorded by his predecessor, Armagedda.

It was, however, soon afterwards described by the band as a huge mistake because the TV company that made the video mocked them in an interview which took place after the video was shown, labelling them "Satanic". In the same interview, Abbath points that the whole video was recorded within two hours and that they had nothing to do with planning its production. Abbath closes his commentary about the video saying, "Anyway, we were stupid enough to rush into it. As I can remember we were a bit confused in those days." It was in this interview that Kolgrim invented the term "holocaust metal" which sparked controversy. The title of the band's next album, Pure Holocaust, was in reference to this.
