= The Older Ones =

Compilation album by Old Funeral
- Released: 1999
- Recorded: 1990–1992 at Grieghallen, Kardemommehuset and Hulen
- Genre: Black metal, blackened death metal
- Label: Hammerheart
- Producer: Pytten

Old Funeral chronology
Devoured Carcass (1991)	The Older Ones (1999)	Grim Reaping Norway (2002)

The Older Ones is the first compilation album by Norwegian blackened death metal band Old Funeral, which was made up by key players in the Norwegian black metal scene, including bassist/vocalist Olve "Abbath" Eikemo (Immortal), guitarist Harald "Demonaz" Nævdal (Immortal) and guitarist Kristian "Varg" Vikernes (Burzum). By the time this album was released, the members had already gone their separate ways, with Varg in jail and Immortal a growing concern for Abbath.

== Track listing ==
1. "Abduction of Limbs" – 4:14
2. "Annoying Individual" – 2:54
3. "Skin and Bone" – 3:51
4. "Haunted" – 3:33
5. "Incantation" – 4:51
6. "Devoured Carcass" – 3:31
7. "Forced to be Lost" – 4:16
8. "Alone Walking" – 6:50
9. "Lyktemenn" – 3:09
10. "Into Hades" – 2:26
11. "My Tyrant Grace" – 5:12
12. "Devoured Carcass" (recorded live at Hulen, 30 September 1991) – 3:29

== Personnel ==
- Olve "Abbath" Eikemo – bass (tracks 1–3), vocals (tracks 1–3)
- Thorlak – bass (tracks 4–12)
- Kristian "Varg" Vikernes – guitars (tracks 4, 5, 6, 7 and 12)
- Tore Bratseth – guitars (tracks 4–12)
- Jørn Inge Tunsberg – guitars (tracks 8–11)
- Padden – drums (all tracks)
