= At the Heart of Winter =

Studio album by Immortal
- Released: February 22, 1999
- Recorded: November 1998
- Studios: The Abyss, Pärlby, Sweden
- Genre: Melodic black metal • thrash metal
- Length: 46:04
- Label: Osmose
- Producers: Peter Tägtgren and Immortal

Immortal chronology
Blizzard Beasts (1997)	At the Heart of Winter (1999)	Damned in Black (2000)

At the Heart of Winter is the fifth studio album by Norwegian black metal band Immortal. It was released on February 22, 1999 through Osmose Productions. It is the first Immortal album not to feature Demonaz on guitar, as he suffered from acute tendinitis in his hands. This is the first album to feature Abbath on guitar, as well as the last album until Sons of Northern Darkness to feature him on bass. The album marks a shift in Immortal's musical sound, towards a black metal and thrash metal fusion.

== Background ==
At the Heart of Winter was recorded in November 1998 at Abyss Studios in Sweden. It is the first Immortal album not to feature a picture of the band on the cover, and the first to prominently feature the band's new logo, with the cover art painted by J. P. Fournier.

== Release ==
In addition to a CD release, At the Heart of Winter was released as a limited-edition metal box, as well as a hand-numbered LP on Osmose, which was later reissued in 2005.

== Reception ==
Professional ratings
Review scores
Source	Rating
AllMusic	4/5 stars
Chronicles of Chaos	9/10
Collector's Guide to Heavy Metal	9/10
Decibel	9/10
Sputnikmusic	4.5/5

At the Heart of Winter was well received by critics. John Serba of AllMusic praised the album, writing, "the result is a clarity and focus that few purveyors of the genre succeeded at finding, a painstakingly organized assemblage of black metal's base elements into a disciplined purity of metal that prefers the power of the almighty riff, instead of the occasionally overblown classical structuring of much-lauded stalwarts Emperor and Cradle of Filth, or the strange experimentation that Mayhem and Arcturus would undertake".

In 2013, Decibel ranked At the Heart of Winter at number eight on its list of the Top 100 Black Metal Albums of All Time.

== Track listing ==
All lyrics are written by Demonaz Doom Occulta; all music is composed by Abbath Doom Occulta. Arranged by Abbath and Horgh.

No.	Title	Length
1.	"Withstand the Fall of Time"	8:29
2.	"Solarfall"	6:02
3.	"Tragedies Blows at Horizon"	8:55
4.	"Where Dark and Light Don't Differ"	6:45
5.	"At the Heart of Winter"	8:00
6.	"Years of Silent Sorrow"	7:53
Total length:		46:04

== Personnel ==
Immortal

- Abbath Doom Occulta – vocals, guitar, bass, synthesizer
- Horgh – drums

Additional personnel

- Demonaz Doom Occulta – lyrics
