= Abbath (album) =

Studio album by Abbath
- Released: January 22, 2016
- Recorded: September 2015
- Genre: Black metal
- Length: 48:10
- Label: Season of Mist

Abbath chronology
Abbath (2016)	Outstrider (2019)

Singles from Abbath
- 1. "Winterbane" Released: November 10, 2015; 2. "Count the Dead" Released: December 11, 2015; 3. "Ashes of the Damned" Released: January 5, 2016

Abbath is the debut album by Norwegian black metal band Abbath. It was released on January 22, 2016, through Season of Mist. It is the only album to feature drummer Creature before his departure in December 2015 and the only one to feature King Ov Hell before his departure in June 2018. The album is composed mostly of content that Abbath had originally prepared for the next Immortal album, which was ultimately never used for it following his departure from the band in 2015.

On January 12, 2016, the entire album was made available for streaming.

== Critical reception ==
Professional ratings
Review scores
Source	Rating
Exclaim!	8/10
MetalSucks	4/5 stars

Reviewing for Exclaim!, Renee Trotier wrote that Abbath has "proven that he doesn't need the Immortal name to expand his black metal legacy." MetalSucks' Excretakano described the record as "one hell of a ride, and very true to the music our man has built his name around."

== Track listing ==
All lyrics are written by Simon Dancaster; all music is composed by Abbath except where noted

No.	Title	Writer(s)	Length
1.	"To War!"		5:35
2.	"Winter Bane"		6:49
3.	"Ashes of the Damned"		3:51
4.	"Ocean of Wounds"		4:44
5.	"Count the Dead"		4:57
6.	"Fenrir Hunts"		4:38
7.	"Root of the Mountain"		5:40
8.	"Endless"		4:36
9.	"Riding on the Wind" (bonus track; Judas Priest cover)	Glenn Tipton, Rob Halford, K.K. Downing	3:04
10.	"Nebular Ravens Winter" (bonus track; Immortal cover)	Demonaz, Abbath	4:16
Total length:			48:10

== Personnel ==
=== Abbath ===
- Abbath Doom Occulta – guitar, vocals, bass on "Riding on the Wind"
- King ov Hell – bass (except "Riding on the Wind")
- Creature – drums

=== Additional musicians ===
- Ole Andre Farstad – lead guitar on "To War", "Count the Dead", "Fenrir Hunts"
- Geir Bratland – keyboard and samples (except "Ocean of Wounds")
- Herbrand Larsen – keyboard and samples on "Ocean of Wounds"

=== Technical personnel ===
- Dag Erik Nygaard – guitar and bass engineering
- Daniel Bergstrand – drums engineering, mixing
- Giorgos Nerantzis – mixing, engineering, mastering
- Urban Nasvall – drum tech

== Charts ==
Chart (2016)	Peak position
Belgian Albums (Ultratop Flanders)	70
Belgian Albums (Ultratop Wallonia)	156
Dutch Albums (Album Top 100)	85
Finnish Albums (Suomen virallinen lista)	33
French Albums (SNEP)	171
Swiss Albums (Schweizer Hitparade)	88
