= Northern Chaos Gods =

Studio album by Immortal
- Released: 6 July 2018
- Recorded: January 2017 – January 2018
- Studio: The Abyss (Pärlby, Sweden), Conclave Studio (Bergen, Norway)
- Genre: Black metal
- Length: 42:14
- Label: Nuclear Blast
- Producer: Immortal; Peter Tägtgren

Immortal chronology
The Seventh Date of Blashyrkh (2010)	Northern Chaos Gods (2018)	War Against All (2023)

Northern Chaos Gods is the ninth studio album by Norwegian black metal band Immortal. The album was released on 6 July 2018. This is the first album after the departure of Abbath from the band and their first studio album in almost nine years since All Shall Fall (2009), marking the longest gap between two studio albums by Immortal. It is also the first Immortal album to feature Demonaz on vocals and the first one since Blizzard Beasts (1997) to feature him on guitar, and their final album to feature Horgh on drums before being dismissed from the band following a legal dispute with Demonaz over ownership of the band's name. Peter Tägtgren played bass on this album. In an interview before the album's release, Demonaz said he wanted to make the album as "grim, dark and cold as possible".

Professional ratings
Aggregate scores
Source	Rating
Metacritic	76/100
Review scores
Source	Rating
Metal Hammer	4/5 stars
Metal Injection	9.5/10 stars
Consequence Of Sound	8.3/10
Kerrang!	4/5 stars
Exclaim!	6/10 stars
The Independent	3/5 stars
Metal Storm	8/10 stars

== Track listing ==
All tracks are written by Demonaz.

No.	Title	Length
1.	"Northern Chaos Gods"	4:25
2.	"Into Battle Ride"	3:50
3.	"Gates to Blashyrkh"	4:38
4.	"Grim and Dark"	5:27
5.	"Called to Ice"	5:06
6.	"Where Mountains Rise"	5:51
7.	"Blacker of Worlds"	3:43
8.	"Mighty Ravendark"	9:14
Total length:		42:14

== Personnel ==
=== Immortal ===
- Demonaz – vocals, guitars, arranging
- Horgh – drums, arranging

=== Additional personnel ===
- Peter Tägtgren – bass, production, mixing
- Jonas Kjellgren – mastering
- Håkon Grav – photography, management, booking
- Jannicke Wiese-Hansen – cover art

== Accolades ==
Publication	Accolade	Rank	Ref.
Decibel	Decibel's Top 40 Albums of 2018	8	

== Charts ==
Chart (2018)	Peak position
Austrian Albums (Ö3 Austria)	17
Belgian Albums (Ultratop Flanders)	39
Belgian Albums (Ultratop Wallonia)	57
Finnish Albums (Suomen virallinen lista)	17
German Albums (Offizielle Top 100)	2
Hungarian Albums (MAHASZ)	33
Norwegian Albums (VG-lista)	16
Scottish Albums (OCC)	44
Swiss Albums (Schweizer Hitparade)	9
