= Behold the Devastation =

Studio album by Unleash the Archers
- Released: August 10, 2009
- Genre: Power metal; heavy metal; melodic death metal
- Length: 39:55
- Label: Self-released

Unleash the Archers chronology
Behold the Devastation (2009)	Demons of the AstroWaste (2011)

Behold the Devastation is the debut studio album by Canadian heavy metal band Unleash the Archers. It was recorded with Jason Hywell Martin at Omega Mediacore Studios in Richmond, British Columbia, and released independently in August 2009. This album was the only one to feature the band's original lineup before Grant Truesdell joined during the recording of their second album Demons of the AstroWaste.

The cover artwork was made by Jean-Pascal Fournier (DragonForce, Edguy, Immortal). Unleash the Archers toured in support of the album with Ravage and 3 Inches of Blood. The tracks "Destroyer" and "Black Goat of the Woods" were originally recorded for the band's self-titled demo released earlier that year.

== Track listing ==
Behold the Devastation track listing
No.	Title	Length
1.	"Eat What You Kill"	4:42
2.	"The Ritual and the Reckoning"	3:51
3.	"Destroyer"	4:21
4.	"The Worthy and the Weak"	5:20
5.	"Black Goat of the Woods"	4:48
6.	"The Filth and the Fable"	5:03
7.	"Tied to a Stag"	5:32
8.	"Four in Hand"	6:18
Total length:		39:55

== Personnel ==
- Brittney Slayes – clean vocals
- Brayden Dyczkowski – guitars, unclean vocals
- Mike Selman – guitars
- Zahk Hedstrom – bass
- Scott Buchanan – drums
