= Phantoma =

Phantoma may refer to:

- Phantoma (album), a 2024 album by Unleash the Archers
- Phantoma, a disused synonym for the mantis genus Empusa
- Phantoma, an Australian dub name for the superhero Golden Bat

== See also ==
- Fantoma Films, an American film distributor
- Fantomah, a Fiction House superheroine
