= Damned in Black =

Studio album by Immortal
- Released: March 27, 2000
- Recorded: October 1999 – February 2000
- Studios: The Abyss, Pärlby, Sweden
- Genres: Black metal; thrash metal
- Length: 36:43
- Label: Osmose
- Producers: Peter Tägtgren, Abbath and Horgh

Immortal chronology
At the Heart of Winter (1999)	Damned in Black (2000)	Sons of Northern Darkness (2002)

Damned in Black is the sixth studio album by Norwegian black metal band Immortal. It was released on March 27, 2000, through Osmose Productions, making it their last album released through their long-time collaboration with the French record label. It's their first album where bass guitar duties are handled by Iscariah. During the recording session in the Abyss studio, the band also recorded a cover version of Mayhem's song "From The Dark Past", which later appeared on Originators of the Northern Darkness - A Tribute to Mayhem compilation.

== Release ==
It is known that there were five different issues distributed next to the original jewel case: a limited edition digipak, a limited edition picture box case, a special cassette tape edition and a limited edition hand-numbered vinyl pressing, which was released under Osmose Productions and was later reissued in 2005.

== Critical reception ==
Professional ratings
Review scores
Source	Rating
AllMusic	4/5 stars
Chronicles of Chaos	8/10

AllMusic wrote, "While it will most likely be overlooked considering Immortal's brightest and deadliest moments came before and after it (respectively)", "Damned in Black strikes one as being At the Heart of Winter and Sons of Northern Darkness' nasty, spiteful little brother, sounding slightly rushed, unkempt and panicky, with whirlwind blastbeats more prominent in the arrangements. But the album benefits from this approach; it's an angrier, more fiery record".

== Track listing ==
All lyrics are written by Demonaz; all music is composed by Abbath and Horgh.

No.	Title	Length
1.	"Triumph"	5:41
2.	"Wrath from Above"	5:46
3.	"Against the Tide (In the Arctic World)"	6:03
4.	"My Dimension"	4:32
5.	"The Darkness That Embrace Me"	4:38
6.	"In Our Mystic Visions Blest"	3:11
7.	"Damned in Black"	6:52
Total length:		36:43

== Personnel ==
=== Immortal ===
- Abbath Doom Occulta (Olve Eikemo) – vocals & guitar
- Iscariah (Stian Smørholm) – bass
- Horgh (Reidar Horghagen) – drums

=== Additional personnel ===
- Demonaz Doom Occulta (Harald Nævdal) – lyrics

== Charts ==
Chart (2000)	Peak position
German Albums Chart	95
