= Demons of the AstroWaste =

Studio album by Unleash the Archers
- Released: May 18, 2011
- Genre: Power metal; heavy metal; melodic death metal
- Length: 62:28
- Label: Self-released

Unleash the Archers chronology
| Behold the Devastation (2009) | Demons of the AstroWaste (2011) | Time Stands Still (2015) |

Singles from Demons of the AstroWaste
- 1. "General of the Dark Army" Released: May 17, 2011

Demons of the AstroWaste is the second studio album by Canadian heavy metal band Unleash the Archers. It was recorded with Nick Engwer and Stu McKillop at the Hive Soundlab in Burnaby, British Columbia, and released independently on May 18, 2011. This album included the first appearance of guitarist Grant Truesdell, who provided solos for their songs "Battle in the Shadow (of the Mountain)" and "The Outlander". He would step in as the new guitar player later that same year after the departure of Mike Selman before the album's release. It is a concept album based on the exploits of a mercenary in space and was set far into the future.

A music video for "General of the Dark Army" was released a year after the album's release, on May 17, 2012. That track and "Daughters of Winterstone" were each given a sneak preview on April 17, 2011.

== Track listing ==
Demons of the AstroWaste track listing
| No. | Title | Length |
|---|---|---|
| 1. | "00:00:01" | 0:47 |
| 2. | "Dawn of Ages" | 4:47 |
| 3. | "Realm of Tomorrow" | 5:15 |
| 4. | "General of the Dark Army" | 7:39 |
| 5. | "Daughters of Winterstone" | 5:42 |
| 6. | "Battle in the Shadow (of the Mountain)" | 6:12 |
| 7. | "Despair" | 5:36 |
| 8. | "The Outlander" | 4:30 |
| 9. | "City of Iron" | 4:28 |
| 10. | "The Fall of the Galactic Guard" | 6:51 |
| 11. | "Astral Annihilation" | 4:23 |
| 12. | "Ripping Through Time" | 6:18 |
| Total length: | | 62:28 |

== Personnel ==
- Brittney Slayes – clean vocals
- Brayden Dyczkowski – guitars, unclean vocals
- Mike Selman – guitars
- Grant Truesdell – guitars (tracks 6 and 9)
- Zahk Hedstrom – bass
- Scott Buchanan – drums
