= Battles in the North =

Studio album by Immortal
- Released: May 15, 1995
- Recorded: September 1994
- Studios: Grieg Hall, Bergen, Norway
- Genre: Black metal
- Length: 35:14
- Label: Osmose
- Producers: Eirik Hundvin and Immortal

Immortal chronology
Pure Holocaust (1993)	Battles in the North (1995)	Blizzard Beasts (1997)

Battles in the North is the third studio album by Norwegian black metal band Immortal. It was released on May 15, 1995 through Osmose Productions. It picks up where its predecessor, Pure Holocaust, left off, featuring extreme tempos, low-fidelity production, and lyrics about coldness or wintery landscapes. This is the first album where the concept of Blashyrkh becomes a central focus. It is the last album to feature Abbath on drums.

== Background ==
The songs "Cursed Realms of the Winterdemons" and "Circling Above in Time Before Time" reference The Underdark, a setting from Dungeons & Dragons.

Music videos were made for "Blashyrkh (Mighty Ravendark)" and "Grim and Frostbitten Kingdoms", the latter featuring Hellhammer on drums, who also became the band's touring drummer during this period.

== Release ==
The album was issued in multiple formats, including the standard CD, a limited edition digipak, a limited edition digipak with embossed band logo and album title, cassette tape, a jewel case with slip cover, fold-out poster and bonus tracks taken from the Immortal EP (limited to 3000 copies), and a limited edition LP released under Osmose Productions (re-pressed six times over the years starting in 2005). The artwork on the limited slip cover CD is an original oil painting done by Jeroen van Valkenburg.

== Reception ==
Professional ratings
Review scores
Source	Rating
AllMusic	4/5 stars
Collector's Guide to Heavy Metal	7/10

In 2009, IGN included Battles in the North in their "10 Great Black Metal Albums" list.

In 2013, Decibel ranked Written in Waters at number 73 on its list of the Top 100 Black Metal Albums of All Time.

== Track listing ==
All lyrics are written by Demonaz, except for "Circling Above in Time Before Time" by Abbath; all music is composed by Abbath and Demonaz, except where noted.

No.	Title	Music	Length
1.	"Battles in the North"		4:11
2.	"Grim and Frostbitten Kingdoms"		2:47
3.	"Descent Into Eminent Silence"		3:10
4.	"Throned by Blackstorms"		3:39
5.	"Moonrise Fields of Sorrow"		2:24
6.	"Cursed Realms of the Winterdemons"	Demonaz	3:59
7.	"At the Stormy Gates of Mist"		3:00
8.	"Through the Halls of Eternity"	Abbath	3:35
9.	"Circling Above in Time Before Time"	Abbath	3:55
10.	"Blashyrkh (Mighty Ravendark)"		4:34
Total length:			35:14

Slip cover version bonus tracks
No.	Title	Length
11.	"Diabolical Fullmoon Mysticism"	0:42
12.	"Unholy Forces of Evil"	4:28
13.	"The Cold Winds of Funeral Frost"	3:40
Total length:		44:04

=== Misprint ===
On some editions of this album, most notably on iTunes, many tracks are mislabelled. The songs play in the order shown above, but the song titles are given as follows:

1. "Battles in the North"
2. "At the Stormy Gates of Mist"
3. "Through the Halls of Eternity"
4. "Moonrise Fields of Sorrow"
5. "Cursed Realms of the Winterdemons"
6. "Throned by Blackstorms"
7. "Grim and Frostbitten Kingdoms"
8. "Descent into Eminent Silence"
9. "Circling Above in Time Before Time"
10. "Blashyrkh (Mighty Ravendark)"

== Personnel ==
- Abbath – vocals, drums, bass guitar, production
- Demonaz – guitar, production
- Eirik Hundvin – production
