= Blizzard Beasts =

Studio album by Immortal
- Released: March 20, 1997
- Recorded: September–November 1996
- Studios: Sigma Studios, Bergen, Norway
- Genre: Black metal
- Length: 28:56
- Label: Osmose
- Producers: Immortal and Henrikke Helland

Immortal chronology
Battles in the North (1995)	Blizzard Beasts (1997)	At the Heart of Winter (1999)

Blizzard Beasts is the fourth studio album by Norwegian black metal band Immortal. It was released on March 20, 1997, through Osmose Productions. It is the last Immortal album to feature the performance of founding member Demonaz Doom Occulta until Northern Chaos Gods (2018) and the first to feature Horgh on drums. Demonaz was later diagnosed with acute tendinitis which prevented him from playing guitar at the required speed for Immortal's music. Stylistically, Blizzard Beasts has primarily songs that are less than three minutes long, contrasting with Immortal's usual longer song lengths.

== Release ==
On the first pressings of the album, the logo was etched into the jewel case front.

== Critical reception ==
Professional ratings
Review scores
Source	Rating
AllMusic	2.5/5 stars
Chronicles of Chaos	8/10
Collector's Guide to Heavy Metal	8/10

AllMusic gave the album an unfavorable review, writing, "Blizzard Beasts [...] sounds like a rush job when compared to the rest of the band's triumphant catalog. The majesty of the group's songwriting is buried in the album's subpar production values, which render the potentially brilliant hyperspeed riffing and drum battery gutless and ineffectual." Chronicles of Chaos noted the album's death metal influence, comparing their sound to that of Morbid Angel's. The website ultimately called it an "unexpected and interesting change for the band, with some fierce and engaging material." Canadian journalist Martin Popoff remarked how the album covered "every facet of stand-alone black metal mayhem" and praised Immortal for playing "the very best no frills black metal on the planet."

== Track listing ==
All lyrics are written by Demonaz.

No.	Title	Music	Length
1.	"Intro"		1:00
2.	"Blizzard Beasts"	Abbath, Demonaz	2:49
3.	"Nebular Ravens Winter"	Abbath	4:13
4.	"Suns That Sank Below"	Abbath, Demonaz	2:47
5.	"Battlefields"	Abbath, Demonaz	3:40
6.	"Mountains of Might"	Abbath	6:38
7.	"Noctambulant"	Abbath	2:22
8.	"Winter of the Ages"	Abbath	2:33
9.	"Frostdemonstorm"	Abbath, Demonaz	2:54
Total length:			28:56

== Personnel ==
- Abbath Doom Occulta – vocals, bass guitar, keyboards
- Demonaz Doom Occulta – guitar
- Horgh – drums

== Charts ==
Chart (1997)	Peak position
Finnish Albums Chart	40
