= Diabolical Fullmoon Mysticism =

Studio album by Immortal
- Released: 1 July 1992
- Recorded: April 1992
- Studios: Grieghallen Studios, Norway
- Genre: Black metal
- Length: 34:59
- Label: Osmose
- Producers: Eirik Hundvin, Immortal

Immortal chronology
Diabolical Fullmoon Mysticism (1992)	Pure Holocaust (1993)

Diabolical Fullmoon Mysticism is the debut studio album by Norwegian black metal band Immortal. It was released on 1 July 1992 through Osmose Productions. It is the only album to feature Armagedda on drums.

== Release ==
The album was issued as a standard CD, a limited edition LP, a limited edition picture disc and a limited edition cassette tape. The picture disc was later reissued by Osmose Productions in 1998 and the regular LP was reissued in 2005.

== Critical reception ==
Professional ratings
Review scores
Source	Rating
AllMusic	2/5 stars

John Serba of AllMusic said, "Diabolical Fullmoon Mysticism presents the germ of a soon-to-be-great black metal outfit", calling it "as rancid and unholy as other early Norse efforts, albeit a hair more melodic and listenable than some of its peers", though "one's time is much better spent with subsequent albums."

== Track listing ==
All lyrics are written by Demonaz; all music is composed by Abbath and Demonaz, except where noted.

No.	Title	Music	Length
1.	"Intro" (is not listed on vinyl, CD, or cassette)		1:35
2.	"The Call of the Wintermoon"		5:40
3.	"Unholy Forces of Evil"		4:28
4.	"Cryptic Winterstorms"	Abbath	6:08
5.	"Cold Winds of Funeral Dust" (misspelled as "Cold Winds of Feneral Dust" on the CD and cassette)		3:47
6.	"Blacker Than Darkness"		4:17
7.	"A Perfect Vision of the Rising Northland"	Abbath	9:04
Total length:			34:59

== Personnel ==
Immortal

- Abbath Doom Occulta – bass guitar, vocals
- Demonaz Doom Occulta – electric guitar, acoustic guitar, album layout
- Armagedda – drums

Additional personnel

- Eirik Hundvin – engineering
- Immortal – production, album photos
- J. W. H. – logo, album front cover
- Stein Kare – album back cover photo
