= The Seventh Date of Blashyrkh =

Video by Immortal
- Released: Summer 2010
- Recorded: 4 August 2007
- Genre: Black metal
- Label: Nuclear Blast

Immortal chronology
All Shall Fall (2009)	The Seventh Date of Blashyrkh (2010)	Northern Chaos Gods (2018)

The Seventh Date of Blashyrkh is the first live video album by Norwegian black metal band Immortal. The album was recorded during their performance at Wacken Open Air in 2007, as part of their comeback tour, The Seventh Date of Blashyrkh.

== Track listing ==
No.	Title	Length
1.	"The Sun No Longer Rises"	5:05
2.	"Withstand the Fall of Time"	8:59
3.	"Sons of Northern Darkness"	4:48
4.	"Tyrants"	7:32
5.	"One by One"	5:25
6.	"Wrath from Above"	5:36
7.	"Unholy Forces of Evil"	6:56
8.	"Unsilent Storms in the North Abyss"	3:12
9.	"At the Heart of Winter"	8:10
10.	"Battles in the North"	5:22
11.	"Blashyrkh (Mighty Ravendark)"	6:15

== Personnel ==
- Abbath Doom Occulta – vocals, guitar
- Horgh – drums
- Apollyon – bass

== Charts ==
Chart (2010)	Peak position
German Albums Chart	60
