= Outstrider =

Studio album by Abbath
- Released: 5 July 2019
- Genre: Black metal
- Length: 38:48
- Label: Season of Mist

Abbath chronology
Abbath (2016)	Outstrider (2019)	Dread Reaver (2022)

Professional ratings
Review scores
Source	Rating
AllMusic	3.5/5 stars
Exclaim!	8/10
Kerrang!	4/5 stars
Metal Injection	8.5/10

Outstrider is the second studio album by Norwegian black metal band Abbath. It was released on 5 July 2019 through Season of Mist. Loudwire named it one of the 50 best metal albums of 2019.

== Track listing ==
No.	Title	Length
1.	"Calm in Ire (Of Hurricane)"	4:32
2.	"Bridge of Spasms"	3:48
3.	"The Artifex"	4:08
4.	"Harvest Pyre"	4:12
5.	"Land of Khem"	4:08
6.	"Outstrider"	5:39
7.	"Scythewinder"	4:16
8.	"Hecate"	4:24
9.	"Pace Till Death" (bonus track; Bathory cover)	3:41
Total length:		38:48

== Personnel ==
=== Abbath ===
- Abbath Doom Occulta – vocals, guitars, songwriting, arrangements (tracks 1, 5, 7, 8)
- Ole André Farstad – guitars (lead, acoustic, baritone), zither, songwriting (guitar leads), arrangements (tracks 1, 5, 7, 8)
- Ukri Suvilehto – drums
- Mia Wallace – bass

=== Additional Personnel ===
- Endre Kirkesola – keyboards, synthesizers, sampling, additional percussion

=== Production ===
- Endre Kirkesola – production, engineering, mixing
- Maor Appelbaum – mastering

== Charts ==
Chart (2019)	Peak position
Austrian Albums (Ö3 Austria)	39
Belgian Albums (Ultratop Flanders)	38
Belgian Albums (Ultratop Wallonia)	65
Finnish Albums (Suomen virallinen lista)	34
German Albums (Offizielle Top 100)	30
Swiss Albums (Schweizer Hitparade)	20
UK Independent Albums (OCC)	30
UK Rock & Metal Albums (OCC)	8
US Heatseekers Albums (Billboard)	2
US Independent Albums (Billboard)	4
US Top Album Sales (Billboard)	43
US Indie Store Album Sales (Billboard)	5
