= I (band) =

Norwegian black metal band

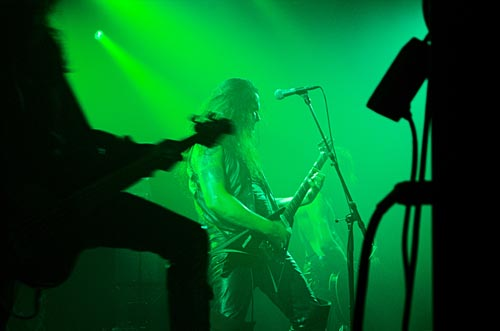
- I performing live in Bergen in 2006

Background information
- Origin: Bergen, Norway
- Genres: Black metal; heavy metal
- Years active: 2003–2006, 2026–present
- Label: Nuclear Blast
- Members: Abbath Doom Occulta; Ice Dale; Armagedda
- Past members: TC King
- Website: i-metal.net

I were a Norwegian black metal supergroup formed in 2003. The band featured Immortal frontman Abbath, Enslaved guitarist Ice Dale, Gorgoroth bassist TC King and former Immortal drummer Armagedda. I released their debut studio album, Between Two Worlds, in 2006 and performed their sole show at the Hole in the Sky festival in Bergen that same year. Although work had begun on songs for a follow-up album, the band ceased to exist following the release of their debut album due to the members' commitment to their other bands.

== History ==
Following Immortal's split and hiatus in 2003, frontman Abbath began working on new material and enlisted Enslaved guitarist Ice Dale to assist with pre-production. The duo started rehearsing with original Immortal drummer Armagedda and were later joined by Gorgoroth bassist TC King. The band's first and only live show took place at the Hole in the Sky festival in Bergen on 26 August 2006. I's debut album, Between Two Worlds, was released on 3 November 2006 in Europe and 14 November 2006 in the United States through Nuclear Blast Records. The band's sound was described as "a fusing of the mammoth black metal anthems of the mighty Immortal and a pronounced rock 'n' groove component that borrows from the likes of Motörhead." In December 2006, Abbath stated that he had started working on new songs for the next album, although no further comment has been made on the project since. During that same year, Immortal reformed for a series of shows and later began work on a new album. In 2015, Abbath left Immortal and formed an eponymous band along with former I bassist TC King. Abbath has regularly covered the I track "Warriors" live since 2015.

In February 2026, it was announced that Abbath, Ice Dale and Armagedda would reunite to perform a 20th anniversary set at the American Fire In the Mountains festival in July. In March, the band was announced to play at the Norwegian Midgardsblot festival in August. On 29 July, it was announced that the band would play at the Wacken Open Air festival in 2027.

== Members ==
- Abbath Doom Occulta (Olve Eikemo) – vocals, guitar
- Ice Dale (Arve Isdal) – guitar
- Nekroman (Andreas Fosse Salbu) – bass (live)
- Armagedda (Gerhard Herfindal) – drums

Former members

- TC King (Tom Cato Visnes) – bass

== Discography ==
- Between Two Worlds (2006)
