= Abyss (Unleash the Archers album) =

Studio album by Unleash the Archers
- Released: 21 August 2020
- Recorded: January 2020
- Studio: Hansen Studios in Ribe, Denmark
- Genre: Power metal, melodic death metal
- Length: 55:56
- Label: Napalm
- Producer: Andrew Kingsley

Unleash the Archers chronology
Apex (2017)	Abyss (2020)	Phantoma (2024)

Singles from Abyss
- 1. "Abyss" Released: 18 June 2020

Abyss is the fifth studio album by Canadian heavy metal band Unleash the Archers, released on 21 August 2020 via Napalm Records. It is a concept album that continues the story introduced in their previous studio effort, Apex.

Due to the departure of bassist Nikko Whitworth before the recording sessions, the band recorded the album as an official quartet: studio musician Benjamin Arscott played bass on the album in Whitworth's place.

== Background, production and writing ==
The band originally planned to release Apex and Abyss as a double album, but they were running out of time and decided to release Apex alone in 2017. During the first half of 2019, they disconnected from everything related to Apex and searched for new influences. By the other half, they wrote the rest of the songs, which would eventually form Abyss, and the album was recorded in January 2020 in Hansen Studios in Ribe, Denmark. In an interview, vocalist Brittney Slayes expressed relief that they were able to do the recordings before the COVID-19 lockdowns.

The album title, cover and track-list were announced on 18 June 2020, together with the first single "Abyss".

== Plot ==
The album continues the story started on Apex; vocalist Brittney Slayes described the plot as follows:

Our protagonist, The Immortal, is once again awakened at the beginning of our story, but this time he is in an unknown place: a ship out in deep space. He wanders alone for a time, reflecting on his misdeeds, searching for his new master. Finally, he finds him, and learns that it is the Grandson of The Matriarch, our antagonist. The Immortal had taken The Grandson’s father away some sixty years before, to be sacrificed by The Matriarch in a ritual to achieve immortality (the events from Apex) and now the Grandson seeks revenge against The Matriarch with the aid of her own weapon, The Immortal.

In the end, the characters decide to use anger to raise their soul instead of spreading mayhem. According to Slayes, Abyss deals with topics such as good versus evil and light versus dark, while showcasing the conflict between the protagonist's good and bad sides and his will to define if he's just a tool or a free being.

== Composition and song information ==
For the first time, the band recorded an album using only seven-string guitars, and Abyss also sees them exploring more of the synthesizer. According to Slayes, this was done in order to "give a different quality than Apex. We wanted it to be a more ethereal sounding record."

"Through Stars" was composed as a synthwave song "hidden behind metal" and "Carry the Flame" was described by Slayes as "a weird spin on a power ballad"; both songs are influenced by the 1980s music. "Legacy" has no chorus and "Faster Than Light" is played in a faster, Stratovarius-like pace and describes the moment in which the Immortal decides to stop running from his past mistakes and face what he's done.

The ending track "Afterlife" features orchestrations by Francesco Paoli (Fleshgod Apocalypse). Guitarist Andrew Kingsley had originally written these parts, but the band felt they sounded like a computer and producer Jacob Hansen, who had mixed and mastered Fleshgod Apocalypse's 2019 album Veleno, contacted Ferrini, who worked on Kingsley's material.

== Release and promotion ==
The album has been released in digital and physical formats, including a double disc gatefold in different colors. There's also a limited edition in "deluxe earbook" format containing two bonus tracks (a synthwave version of "Abyss" and a folk pop version of "Soulbound") and a bonus disc with instrumental versions of the regular songs.

On the day after the album's release, the band performed live at The Rickshaw Theatre in Vancouver and streamed the show. The band plans to release a two-book graphic novel about the story of Apex and Abyss.

== Reception ==
Professional ratings
Review scores
Source	Rating
Metal Hammer	3.5/5 stars
The Progspace	4.5/5 stars

The Progspace's Bob said "Power Metal can come over as a bit corny sometimes, and it is not that high up on my list of favourite genres. But this album by Unleash the Archers is something else" and called Abyss "stunning". Writing for Metal Hammer, Holly Wright said the album makes the listener conclude the band has grown up and described "Legacy" as "a spiralling mix of Deafheaven, DragonForce and Devin Townsend" and the band's "career's centrepiece".

== Track listing ==
All tracks are written by Unleash the Archers unless noted.

Abyss track listing
No.	Title	Length
1.	"Waking Dream"	3:45
2.	"Abyss"	6:44
3.	"Through Stars"	5:34
4.	"Legacy"	5:26
5.	"Return to Me"	5:34
6.	"Soulbound"	3:54
7.	"Faster Than Light"	5:11
8.	"The Wind That Shapes the Land"	8:36
9.	"Carry the Flame"	4:42
10.	"Afterlife"	7:30
Total length:		55:56

Japanese edition bonus track
No.	Title	Writer(s)	Length
11.	"Sunglasses at Night"	Corey Hart	5:09
Total length:			61:05

== Personnel ==
Unleash the Archers

- Brittney Slayes – clean vocals
- Andrew Kingsley – guitars, clean vocals on "Carry the Flame", synthesizer, production
- Grant Truesdell – guitars, unclean vocals
- Scott Buchanan – drums

Session members and guests

- Benjamin Arscott – bass
- Francesco Ferrini (Fleshgod Apocalypse) – orchestrations on "Afterlife"

Technical personnel

- Jacob Hansen – engineering, mixing and mastering

== Charts ==
Chart performance for Abyss
Chart (2020)	Peak position
Austrian Albums (Ö3 Austria)	72
Belgian Albums (Ultratop Flanders)	157
German Albums (Offizielle Top 100)	21
Scottish Albums (OCC)	59
Swiss Albums (Schweizer Hitparade)	60
UK Album Downloads (OCC)	33
UK Independent Albums (OCC)	25
UK Rock & Metal Albums (OCC)	6
