= War Against All =

Studio album by Immortal
- Released: 26 May 2023
- Recorded: 2023
- Studio: Conclave Studio (Bergen, Norway)
- Genre: Black metal
- Length: 38:07
- Label: Nuclear Blast
- Producer: Arve Isdal

Immortal chronology
Northern Chaos Gods (2018)	War Against All (2023)

Professional ratings
Review scores
Source	Rating
Blabbermouth.net	8.5/10
Metal Hammer	4.5/7
Chaos Zine	4.5/5

War Against All is the tenth studio album by Norwegian black metal band Immortal, released on 26 May 2023. It is the first Immortal album featuring only Demonaz as a member of the band.

== Track listing ==
All tracks are written by Demonaz.

War Against All track listing
No.	Title	Length
1.	"War Against All"	3:26
2.	"Thunders of Darkness"	3:48
3.	"Wargod"	4:38
4.	"No Sun"	4:16
5.	"Return to Cold"	4:31
6.	"Nordlandihr"	7:12
7.	"Immortal"	4:14
8.	"Blashyrkh My Throne"	5:58
Total length:		38:07

== Personnel ==
=== Immortal ===
- Demonaz – vocals, guitars, lyrics

=== Additional personnel ===
- Ice Dale (Arve Isdal) – bass, additional guitars, producer, recording
- Kevin Kvåle – drums
- Herbrand Larsen – recording, mixing
- Iver Sandøy – mastering (at Solslottet)

== Charts ==
Chart performance for War Against All
Chart (2023)	Peak position
Austrian Albums (Ö3 Austria)	16
Finnish Albums (Suomen virallinen lista)	36
French Albums (SNEP)	145
German Albums (Offizielle Top 100)	16
Polish Albums (ZPAV)	55
Scottish Albums (OCC)	51
Swiss Albums (Schweizer Hitparade)	18
UK Album Downloads (OCC)	61
UK Independent Albums (OCC)	11
UK Rock & Metal Albums (OCC)	10
