= Between Two Worlds (I album) =

Studio album by I
- Released: November 3, 2006
- Recorded: 2006 at Lydriket Studio
- Genre: Heavy metal, black metal
- Length: 42:36
- Label: Nuclear Blast
- Producer: I

Professional ratings
Review scores
| Source | Rating |
|---|---|
| About.com | 4/5 stars |
| AllMusic | 3.5/5 stars |

Between Two Worlds is the only album by Norwegian black metal supergroup I. The album was recorded at the Lydriket Studio and later mixed by Peter Tägtgren at the Abyss studio. The album showcases Abbath's straightforward metal style rather than his black metal style. The album displays a clear influence from classic metal bands, which although present in Abbath's primary band Immortal, is here the sole focus of the music. A limited edition digipack was released, which includes three bonus tracks. A limited edition metal box was also released, also featuring the three bonus tracks, and was limited to 1000 copies.

== Track listing ==
All lyrics are written by Demonaz; all music is composed by Abbath.

| No. | Title | Length |
|---|---|---|
| 1. | "The Storm I Ride" | 3:27 |
| 2. | "Warriors" | 5:53 |
| 3. | "Between Two Worlds" | 5:52 |
| 4. | "Battalions" | 4:46 |
| 5. | "Mountains" | 6:05 |
| 6. | "Days of North Winds" | 4:04 |
| 7. | "Far Beyond the Quiet" | 7:13 |
| 8. | "Cursed We Are" | 5:14 |
| 9. | "Bridges of Fire" (Digipack edition bonus track) | 7:36 |
| 10. | "Shadowed Realms (Intro)" (Digipack edition bonus track) | 1:31 |
| 11. | "Shadowed Realms" (Digipack edition bonus track) | 5:44 |
| Total length: | | 57:25 |

== Personnel ==
- Abbath (Olve Eikemo) – vocals, guitars, arrangements
- T.C. King (Tom Cato Visnes) – bass
- Ice Dale (Arve Isdal) – guitars, arrangements, production
- Armagedda – drums
- Demonaz (Harald Nævdal) – lyrics

=== Production ===
- Peter Tägtgren – mixing
- Geir Luedy – engineering
- Herbrand Larsen – engineering
- Kristian Tvedt – editing
- Thomas Erberger – mastering
- Martin Kvamme – cover design, artwork
- Hakon Grav for Photograve management – management
