= Apex (album) =

2017 album by Unleash the Archers

Studio album by Unleash the Archers
- Released: June 2, 2017
- Studio: Hansen, Ribe, Denmark
- Genre: Power metal; heavy metal; speed metal
- Length: 60:39
- Label: Napalm

Unleash the Archers chronology
Time Stands Still (2015)	Apex (2017)	Abyss (2020)

Professional ratings
Review scores
Source	Rating
Metal Assault	9.5/10

Apex is the fourth studio album by Canadian heavy metal band Unleash the Archers. It was released on June 2, 2017, through Napalm Records.

== Track listing ==
All tracks are written by Unleash the Archers, except where noted

Apex track listing
No.	Title	Length
1.	"Awakening"	7:17
2.	"Shadow Guide"	3:56
3.	"The Matriarch"	4:02
4.	"Cleanse the Bloodlines"	5:54
5.	"The Coward's Way"	5:05
6.	"False Walls"	8:05
7.	"Ten Thousand Against One"	5:37
8.	"Earth and Ashes"	6:35
9.	"Call Me Immortal"	5:46
10.	"Apex"	8:20
Total length:		60:39

Japan bonus track
No.	Title	Writer(s)	Length
11.	"Queen of the Reich" (Queensrÿche cover)	Chris DeGarmo	4:16
Total length:			64:55

== Personnel ==
Unleash the Archers

- Brittney Slayes – clean vocals
- Scott Buchanan – drums
- Grant Truesdell – unclean vocals, guitars
- Andrew Kingsley – guitars
- Nikko Whitworth – bass

Production

- Jacob Hansen – recording, mixing, and mastering
- Jonas Haagensen – engineering assistant
- Shimon Karmel – photography
- Ken Sarafin – artwork, layout

== Charts ==
Chart performance for Apex
Chart (2017)	Peak position
US Independent Albums (Billboard)	28
