= Time Stands Still (Unleash the Archers album) =

Studio album by Unleash the Archers
- Released: June 26, 2015
- Genres: Power metal; melodic death metal
- Length: 55:33
- Label: Napalm

Unleash the Archers chronology
Demons of the AstroWaste (2011)	Time Stands Still (2015)	Apex (2017)

Singles from Time Stands Still
- 1. "Tonight We Ride" Released: May 26, 2015; 2. "Test Your Metal" Released: July 14, 2015; 3. "Time Stands Still" Released: November 30, 2016

Time Stands Still is the third studio album by Canadian heavy metal band Unleash the Archers. It was released on June 26, 2015, through Napalm Records.

== Background and release ==
In February 2015, the band announced their signing with Napalm Records. Soon after, the title, track listing and release date for Time Stands Still were revealed. The album was released in Europe on June 26 and in North America on July 10. It was originally slated for a 2014 release but was pushed back after Napalm Records signed the band. It is the first album without Brayden Dyczkowski, who had been one of the main songwriters up until he parted with the band in late 2013; he was replaced by Andrew Kingsley, who is also trained in jazz, on guitar.

On May 26, 2015, the band released the "Tonight We Ride" video, inspired by Mad Max Beyond Thunderdome. The video was filmed in the Nevada desert, using props from the Death Guild Thunderdome camp at Burning Man. Music videos were also made for the songs "Test Your Metal" and the title track.

== Track listing ==
Time Stands Still track listing
No.	Title	Length
1.	"Northern Passage"	1:47
2.	"Frozen Steel"	5:39
3.	"Hail of the Tide"	5:31
4.	"Tonight We Ride"	6:25
5.	"Test Your Metal"	3:13
6.	"Crypt"	5:21
7.	"No More Heroes"	6:53
8.	"Dreamcrusher"	9:16
9.	"Going Down Fighting"	5:28
10.	"Time Stands Still"	6:00
Total length:		55:33

Bonus track
No.	Title	Length
11.	"Tonight We Ride" (video edit)	5:23
Total length:		60:56

Japanese bonus track
No.	Title	Length
12.	"Stay Hungry" (featuring Iuri Sanson; Twisted Sister cover)	3:07
Total length:		64:03

== Personnel ==
- Brittney Slayes – clean vocals
- Scott Buchanan – drums
- Grant Truesdell – guitars, unclean vocals
- Andrew Kingsley – guitars
- Kyle Sheppard – bass
