= Jean-Pascal Fournier =

French illustrator

- Born: 1972 (age 53–54); Grenoble, France
- Other name: JP Fournier
- Occupations: Artist and illustrator
- Years active: 1996–2020

Jean-Pascal Fournier, also known by the name JP Fournier (born 1972), is a French former artist and illustrator known for designing cover art and logos for power metal, extreme metal and heavy metal albums. Fournier's illustrations typically feature elements of fantasy and mythology, such as heroic figures, monsters, and wizards.

== Biography ==
Jean-Pascal Fournier was born near Grenoble, France in 1972. Fournier began making art and illustrations at a young age, and graduated from the Emile Cohl Art Academy in 1995. Many of his illustrations incorporate influences from fantasy art, particularly depictions of monsters and magic. His style is inspired by Classical painting, Victorian art and illustrators of heroic fantasy. Fournier cited the influence of artists like Kris Verwimp, Derek Riggs, Andreas Marschall, Joe Petagno, Ed Repka.

Over the course of his career, Fournier illustrated albums for bands such as Edguy, Avantasia, DragonForce, Elvenking (band), Impaled Nazarene, Immortal (band), Mystic Circle, Nightmare (French band) and Unleash the Archers. Fournier illustrated Metal & Fantasy Vol. 1 by Frantz-Emmanuel Petiteau (2014).

On April 2, 2020, following an alleged suicide attempt, Fournier was arrested by authorities in Grenoble for the murder of his 80-year-old father.
