= Old Funeral =

Norwegian metal band

- Origin: Bergen, Norway
- Genre: Death metal
- Years active: 1988–1992, 2015
- Past members: Olve Eikemo; Varg Vikernes; Tore Bratseth; Jørn Inge Tunsberg; Harald Nævdal; Padden; Thorlak Sigvaldason

Old Funeral was a Norwegian death metal band from Bergen.

== History ==
Old Funeral was one of the first bands to form in the Norwegian extreme metal scene, formed in 1988. By 1992, the band had already dissolved. Since the breakup, many members (such as Abbath and Demonaz of Immortal, and Varg Vikernes, in Old Funeral as Kristian Vikernes, of Burzum) are now quite famous as members of the early Norwegian black metal scene. On 15 November 2015, Old Funeral reunited to perform at Blekkmetal 2015 in Bergen, Norway.

According to Vikernes, the Old Funeral name was originally simply "Funeral", however upon finding out that another band called Funeral existed (although formed later than the band described in this article), they added the "Old" to distinguish from the other Funeral.

== Members ==
=== Final line-up ===
- Olve Eikemo ("Abbath") – bass, vocals (1988–1990, 2015)
- Tore Bratseth – guitar (1988–1992, 2015)
- Jan Atle Åserød ("Padden") – drums (1988–1992, 2015), vocals (1990–1992; 2015)

=== Previous members ===
- Harald Nævdal ("Demonaz") – guitar (1988–1989)
- Kristian Vikernes ("Varg Vikernes") – guitar (1989–1991)
- Jørn Inge Tunsberg – guitar (1991–1992)
- Thorlak Sigvaldason – bass (1991–1992)

Timeline

== Discography ==
- The Fart that Should Not Be (demo, self-released, 1989)
- Abduction of Limbs (demo, self-released, 1990)
- Devoured Carcass (EP, Thrash Records, 1991)
- The Older Ones (compilation, Hammerheart Records, 1999)
- Join the Funeral Procession (compilation, Hammerheart Records, 1999)
- Grim Reaping Norway (live album, Hearse Records, 2002)
- Our Condolences 1988–1992 (compilation, Soulseller Records, 2013)
- Old Coffin Days (compilation; A Fine Day To Die Records, 2020)
