= Abbath (band) =

Norwegian black metal band

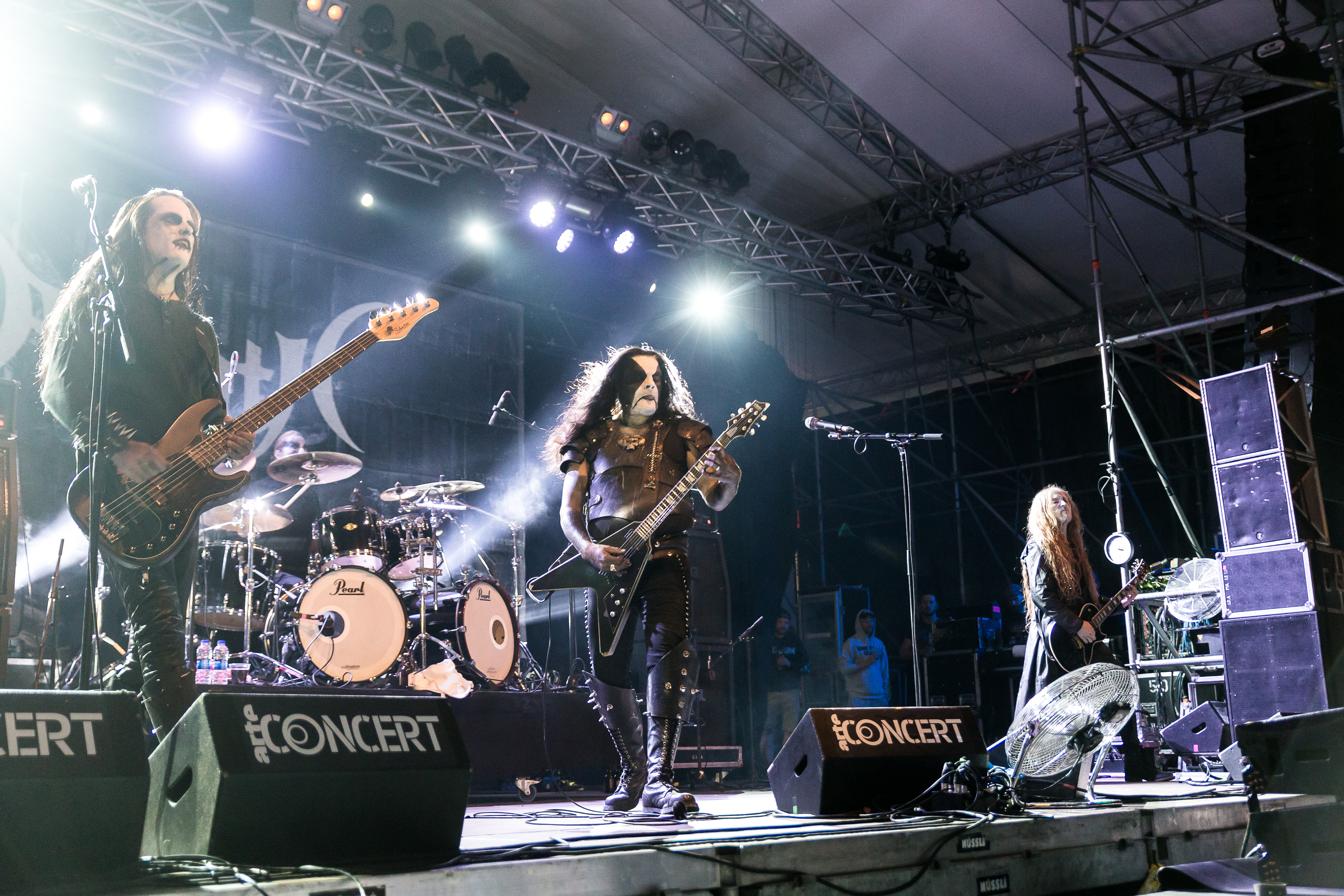
- Abbath at With Full Force 2018

Background information
- Origin: Bergen, Norway
- Genres: Black metal
- Years active: 2015–present
- Label: Season of Mist
- Members: Abbath Doom Occulta; Ukri Suvilehto; Raud
- Past members: Creature; King ov Hell; Silmaeth; Emil Wiksten; Mia Wallace
- Website: www.abbath.net

Abbath is a Norwegian black metal band formed in 2015 by former Immortal guitarist and vocalist Abbath Doom Occulta after departing from Immortal earlier in 2015. To date, the band has released three studio albums: Abbath (2016), Outstrider (2019) and Dread Reaver (2022).

== History ==
In April 2015, Metal Hammer announced that Abbath Doom Occulta had recruited members to the band, specifically King ov Hell from God Seed and drummer Creature to participate in the band. They also recruited Vredehammer guitarist and vocalist Per Valla to tour with the band as lead guitarist. The band was set to enter a recording studio later this year to work on their debut album for a 2016 release. During their Debut performance at Tuska Open Air 2015, they played a completed song titled "Fenrir Hunts" that would be featured on then-upcoming debut album.

Their debut self-titled album Abbath was released January 22, 2016 on Season of Mist. On 12 December 2015, it was announced that drummer Creature left the band. Several days later on 15 December, live member Per Valla left the band. At the start of 2016 Gabe Seeber, donning the Creature mask, joined as live drummer replacing Creature Kevin Foley and replacing Per Valla is Ole André Farstad, who played on the debut album, joined as live guitarist.

On 6 October 2016, Abbath announced on their Facebook page that they were working on their second album, planned for a 2017 release. On 11 July 2018, King ov Hell left the band due to conflicting views on lyrical concepts of the upcoming album. Emil Wiksten also left the band shortly after.

On 14 March 2019 they announced their second studio album Outstrider would be released on 5 July 2019 and a new line up that recorded the album and would perform live was revealed which included drummer Ukri Suvilehto, guitarist Raud and bassist Mia Wallace.

On 25 November 2019 Abbath Doom Occulta announced via Facebook that he was going into rehab for addiction following a concert in Buenos Aires, Argentina, cancelling the remainder of Abbath's South American tour. The concert was delayed for two hours and concluded with Abbath throwing his guitar into the crowd after several false starts and being escorted to his dressing room. This led to a large amount of backlash on social media and violent clashes with fans and police.

On 28 January 2020, Mia Wallace revealed that she was no longer part of the band. This message was relayed to her over the phone by the Abbath's manager shortly before the beginning of the Outstrider 2020 European tour. No formal announcement was made by the band, but she was replaced on bass by touring member Rusty Cornell. Wallace would go on to become the bassist of Nervosa, and she would return to Abbath in 2021.

It was announced in early 2021 that Abbath was recording their third studio album, due out later that year. On 12 January 2022, Abbath announced the title of the album as Dread Reaver, which was released on March 25.

In 2025, the band participated in the Hell's Heroes music festival held at the White Oak Music Hall in Houston.

== Band members ==
Abbath, live at With Full Force 2018

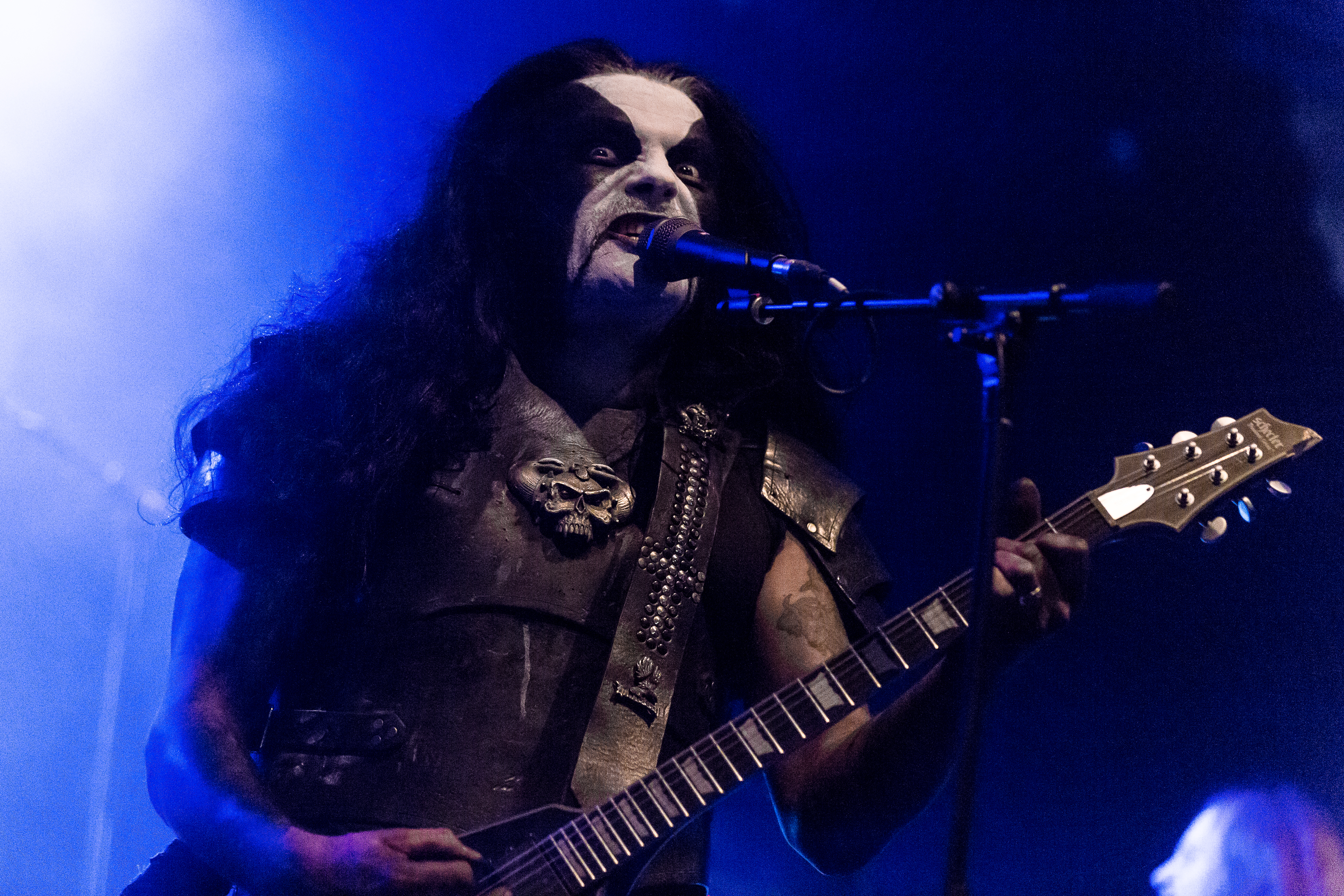
Abbath Doom Occulta

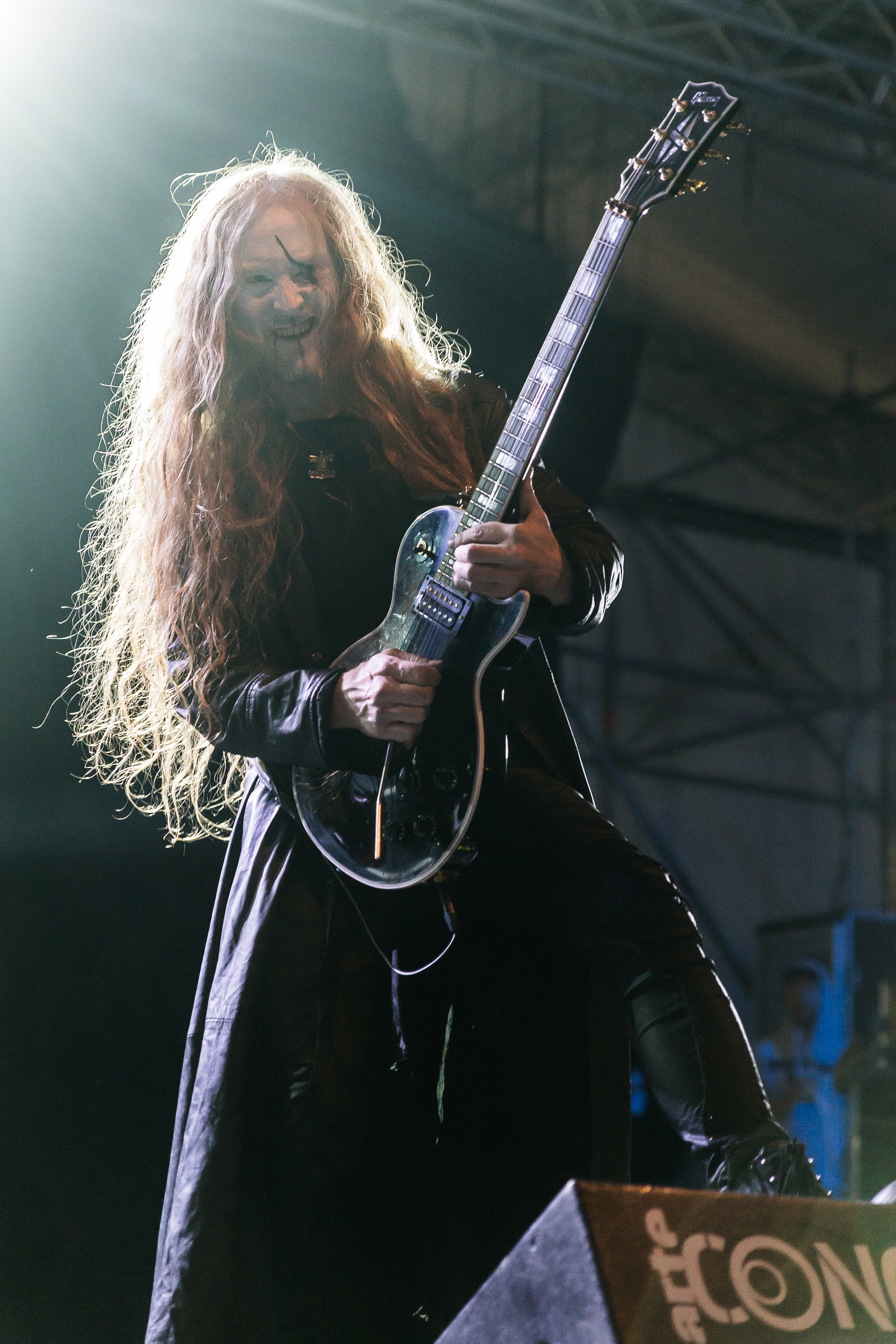
Ole André Farstad

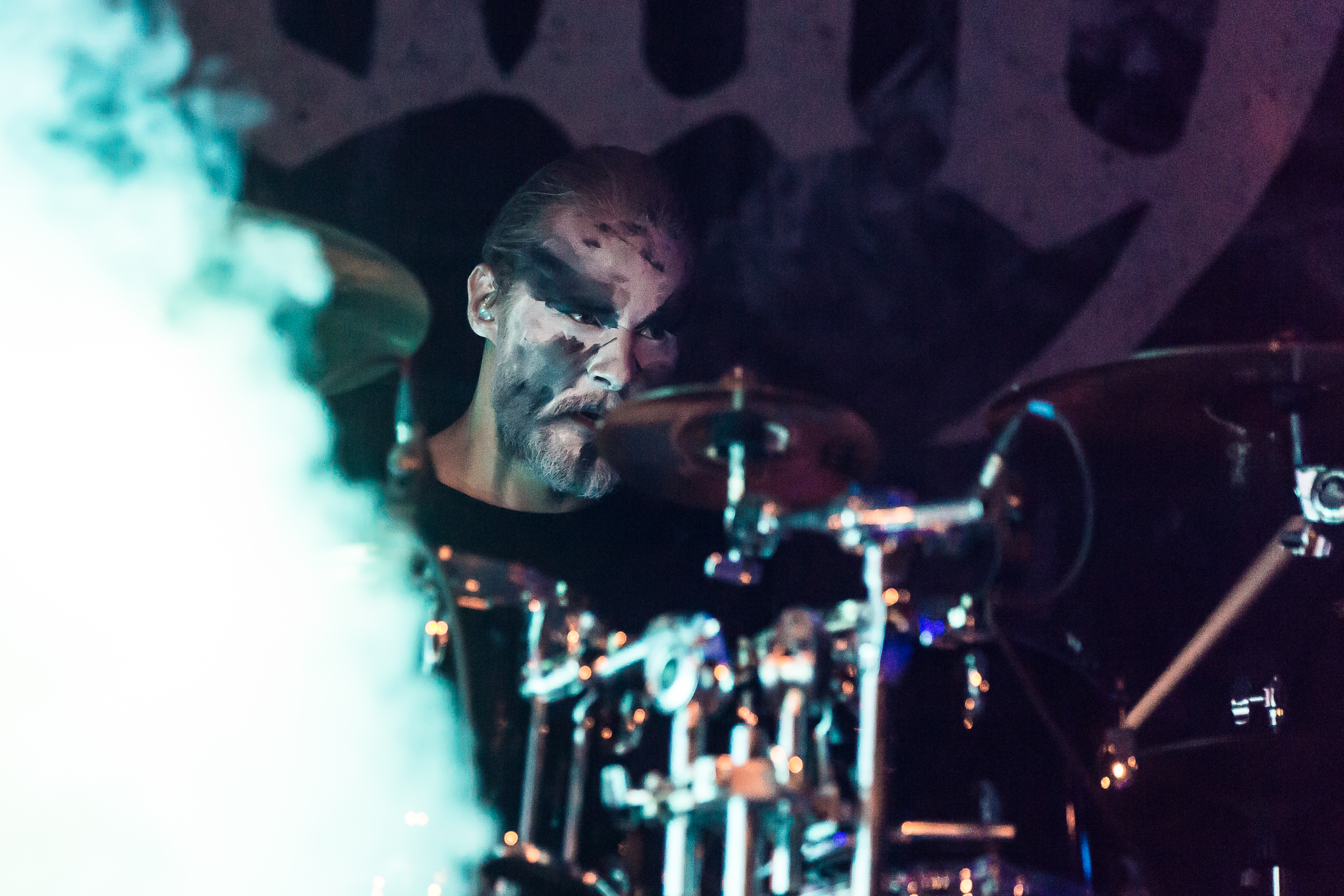
Ukri Suvilehto

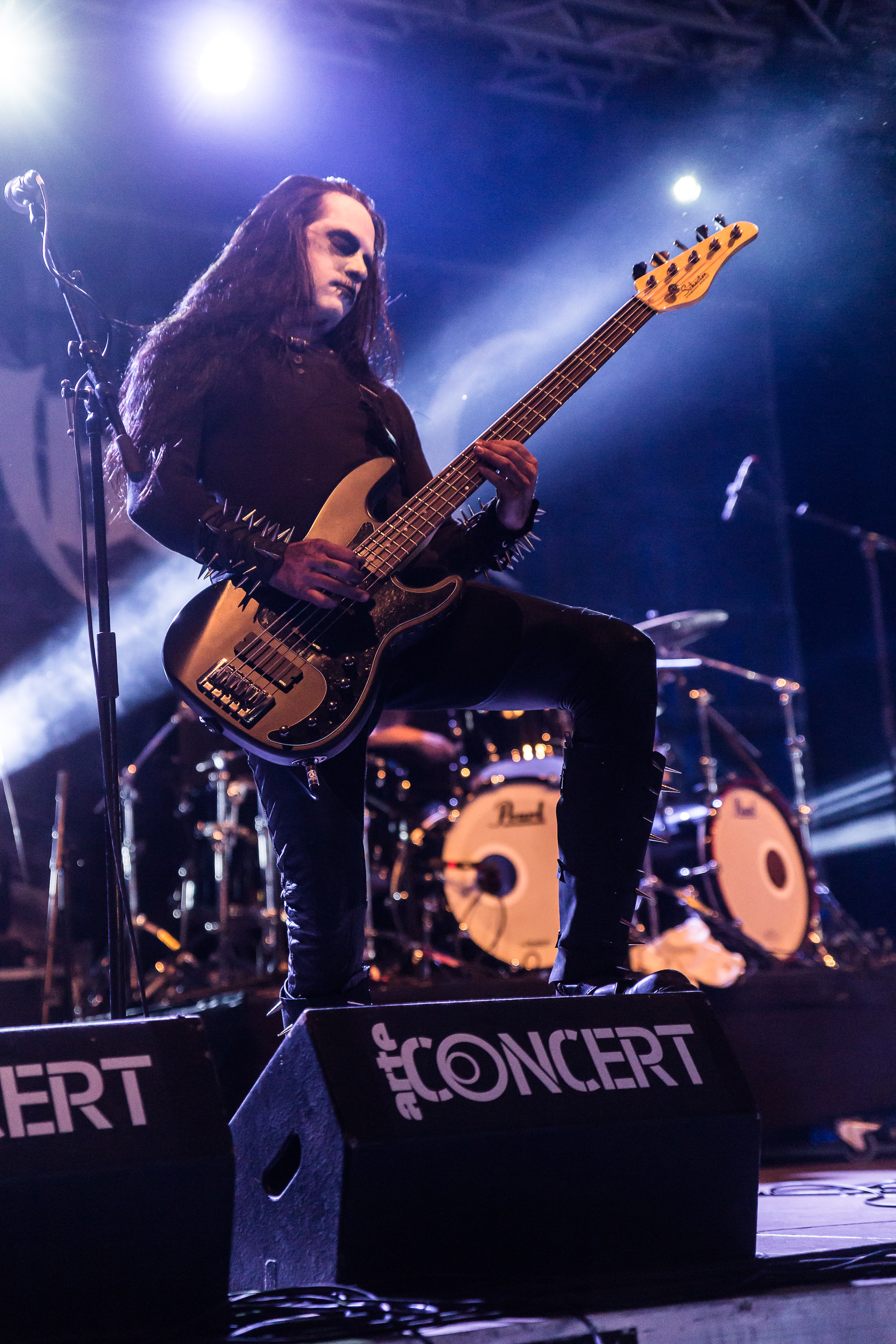
Rusty Cornell

Current

- Abbath Doom Occulta – vocals (2015–present), rhythm guitar (2015–2016, 2018–present), bass (2018, 2020–2021, 2022–present), lead guitar (2015)
- 'Raud' Ole André Farstad – lead guitar (2015–2016, 2016–present), bass (2018, 2020–2021, 2022–present)
- Ukri Suvilehto – drums (2018–present)

Current live musicians

- Andreas Fosse Salbu – bass (2023–present)

Former

- King ov Hell – bass (2015–2018)
- 'Creature' Kevin Foley – drums (2015)
- Silmaeth – rhythm guitar (2016–2018), lead guitar (2016)
- 'Creature' Emil Wiksten – drums (2016–2018)
- Mia Wallace – bass (2019–2020, 2021–2022)

Former live musicians

- Per Valla – lead and rhythm guitar (2015)
- 'Creature' Gabe Seeber – drums (2015–2016)
- Dan Gargiulo – lead and rhythm guitar (2016)
- Rusty Cornell – bass (2016, 2018–2019, 2020–2021)
- Ice Dale – bass (2022–2023)

Timeline

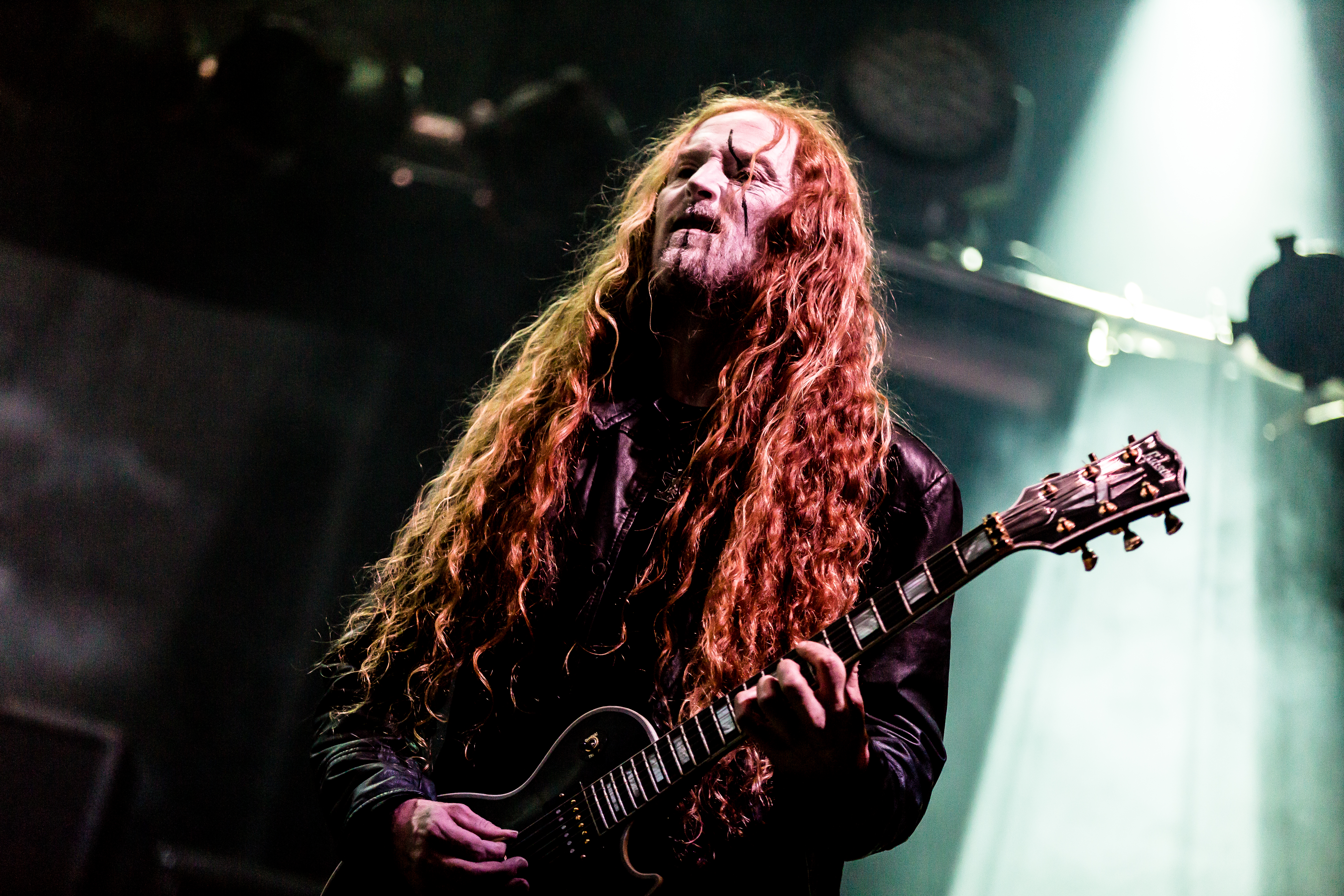
Guitarist Ole André Farstad at Party.San 2017

== Discography ==
=== Studio albums ===
- Abbath (2016)
- Outstrider (2019)
- Dread Reaver (2022)

=== Other releases ===
- "Winter Bane" (single, 2015)
- "Count the Dead" (single, 2015)
- "Ashes of the Damned" (single, 2016)
- "Harvest Pyre" (single, 2019)
- "Calm in Ire (Of Hurricane)" (single, 2019)
- "Outstrider" (single, 2019)
- "Dream Cull" (single, 2022)
- "Dread Reaver" (single, 2022)
- "The Book of Breath" (single, 2022)
