= Harald Nævdal =

- Also known as: Demonaz Doom Occulta
- Born: Harald Nævdal; 6 July 1970 (age 56)
- Origin: Bergen, Norway
- Genres: Black metal
- Occupations: Musician; songwriter
- Instruments: Vocals; guitar
- Years active: 1988–present
- Label: Nuclear Blast Records
- Member of: Immortal
- Formerly of: Old Funeral; Amputation

Harald Nævdal (born 6 July 1970), known by his stage name Demonaz Doom Occulta, or simply Demonaz, is a Norwegian musician best known as the founding guitarist and chief lyricist for the black metal band Immortal. He is currently the only official member of Immortal, and has previously been a member of Old Funeral and Amputation.

== Career ==
Demonaz formed Immortal together with Abbath in 1991, alongside other former members of Old Funeral and Amputation. As a guitarist, he is known for his fast and intricate guitar parts which heavily features diminished power chords. Demonaz' lyrics focus on icy landscapes and a fictional land called Blashyrkh. The story of Blashyrkh is gradually told throughout Immortal's albums. When writing lyrics he often takes long walks in the Norwegian countryside near his hometown of Bergen for inspiration. Demonaz and Abbath comprised the core of Immortal in its early years, with an unstable lineup until drummer Horgh joined the band in 1997.

Demonaz played guitar on the albums Diabolical Fullmoon Mysticism, Pure Holocaust, Battles in the North and Blizzard Beasts. In 1997, he was diagnosed with acute tendinopathy and could no longer play guitar at the speed required for Immortal. Demonaz continued writing lyrics for the band and assumed the role of manager, often accompanying the band on tour.

Immortal split-up in 2002 and later reunited in 2006. That same year, Demonaz contributed lyrics to the black metal supergroup I and their album Between Two Worlds. He released his first solo album, March of the Norse, in 2011. After having surgery to correct his tendinitis in 2013, Demonaz was able to play guitar again and returned to Immortal as a guitarist and vocalist following Abbath's departure in 2015. Immortal's first album to feature instrumental contributions from Demonaz in 21 years, Northern Chaos Gods, was released on 6 July 2018. Following a legal dispute over the rights to the band's name between Demonaz and Horgh, the latter left the band in 2022. Immortal's first album to only feature Demonaz as a band member, War Against All, was released on 26 May 2023.

== Discography ==
=== With Immortal ===
- Diabolical Fullmoon Mysticism (1992)
- Pure Holocaust (1993)
- Battles in the North (1995)
- Blizzard Beasts (1997)
- Northern Chaos Gods (2018)
- War Against All (2023)

==== Lyrics only ====
- At the Heart of Winter (1999)
- Damned in Black (2000)
- Sons of Northern Darkness (2002)
- All Shall Fall (2009)

=== With I ===
- Between Two Worlds (2006)

=== Solo ===
- March of the Norse (2011)
