= All Shall Fall =

Studio album by Immortal
- Released: 25 September 2009
- Recorded: April–June 2009
- Studios: The Abyss, Pärlby, Sweden; Grieghallen Studio, Bergen, Norway
- Genre: Black metal
- Length: 40:09
- Label: Nuclear Blast
- Producers: Immortal, Peter Tägtgren

Immortal chronology
Sons of Northern Darkness (2002)	All Shall Fall (2009)	The Seventh Date of Blashyrkh (2010)

Professional ratings
Review scores
Source	Rating
About.com	4.5/5 stars
AllMusic	3.5/5 stars
Blabbermouth	7/10
Chronicles of Chaos	9/10 stars
Pitchfork Media	7.1/10

All Shall Fall is the eighth studio album by Norwegian black metal band Immortal. The album was released in Europe on 25 September 2009 and in the US on 6 October 2009. It is the only album to feature bassist Apollyon and the last to feature vocalist/guitarist Abbath Doom Occulta.

== Recording and production ==
In January 2008, Immortal started rehearsing and writing new material for their 8th studio album. After spending much time performing live that year, the band entered both Grieghallen and Abyss studios in April 2009 to start recording the album. A month later the band already completed recording the album and announced the album's title. In June, Terrorizer was given the opportunity to listen to the just-recorded album and posted an exclusive track-by-track breakdown.

== Track listing ==
All lyrics are written by Demonaz; all music is composed by Abbath.

No.	Title	Length
1.	"All Shall Fall"	5:57
2.	"The Rise of Darkness"	5:47
3.	"Hordes to War"	4:32
4.	"Norden on Fire"	6:15
5.	"Arctic Swarm"	4:01
6.	"Mount North"	5:07
7.	"Unearthly Kingdom"	8:30
Total length:		40:09

== Personnel ==
Immortal

- Abbath Doom Occulta – guitars, vocals
- Apollyon – bass
- Horgh – drums

Additional personnel

- Are Mundal – "Unearthly Kingdom" intro
- Demonaz Doom Occulta – lyrics
- Jonas Kjellgren – mastering
- Pär Olofsson – cover design, artwork
- Peter Beste – photography
- Peter Tägtgren – production, mixing
- Pytten – engineering

== Charts ==
Chart (2009)	Peak position
Finnish Albums Chart	20
German Albums Chart	33
Norwegian Albums Chart	21
US Billboard 200	162
