= Pure Holocaust =

Studio album by Immortal
- Released: 1 November 1993
- Recorded: Grieg Hall, Bergen, Norway
- Genre: Black metal
- Length: 33:43
- Label: Osmose
- Producers: Eirik Hundvin and Immortal

Immortal chronology
Diabolical Fullmoon Mysticism (1992)	Pure Holocaust (1993)	Battles in the North (1995)

Professional ratings
Review scores
Source	Rating
Allmusic	4.5/5 stars

Pure Holocaust is the second album by Norwegian black metal band Immortal. It was released on November 1, 1993, on Osmose Productions. It is generally faster sounding than its predecessor Diabolical Fullmoon Mysticism. The lyrics focus mainly on ice, snow, and fantasy landscapes.

The album was released as a standard CD, as a limited LP on Osmose Productions (which was reissued in 2005), and as a limited edition picture disc in 1998.

== Critical reception ==
Marc van der Pol of Allmusic approved: "On Pure Holocaust, dark, technically advanced, powerful, and challenging riffs propel the songs forward through a myriad of blasting drumbeats. Yet surprisingly, the album also conveys a gentler ambience in sections, without the use of a trite "gothic" aesthetic. The ambiguous emotional quality, unique style, and heart-pumping rhythms are all reasons to purchase this."

In a Black Metal History retrospective, Atanamar Sunyata wrote: "Every aspect of Immortal's game is accelerated on Pure Holocaust. Demonaz unleashes distinctive riffs with uncanny rapidity, tremolo picking at inhuman speeds. Guitars and drums appear to be locked in a race to the icy death, constantly challenging each other for dominance. The album indicates a deep desire to up the black metal ante, bringing an increased focus on speed and brutality without completely breaking the mold Quorthon had so expertly cast."

In 2013, Decibel ranked Pure Holocaust at number 25 on its list of the Top 100 Black Metal Albums of All Time.

== Track listing ==
All music by Abbath; tracks 1 to 4 co-written with Demonaz. All lyrics by Demonaz.

No.	Title	Length
1.	"Unsilent Storms in the North Abyss"	3:14
2.	"A Sign for the Norse Hordes to Ride"	2:35
3.	"The Sun No Longer Rises"	4:19
4.	"Frozen by Icewinds"	4:40
5.	"Storming Through Red Clouds and Holocaustwinds"	4:39
6.	"Eternal Years on the Path to the Cemetery Gates"	3:30
7.	"As the Eternity Opens"	5:30
8.	"Pure Holocaust"	5:16
Total length:		33:43

== Personnel ==
Immortal

- Abbath Doom Occulta - vocals, bass guitar, drums (Note: Though drummer Grim features on the cover and was in the band at the time of the album’s release, it was Abbath who played session drums, as Grim joined the band after recording had finished.)
- Demonaz Doom Occulta - guitar
