= Unleash the Archers =

Canadian power metal band

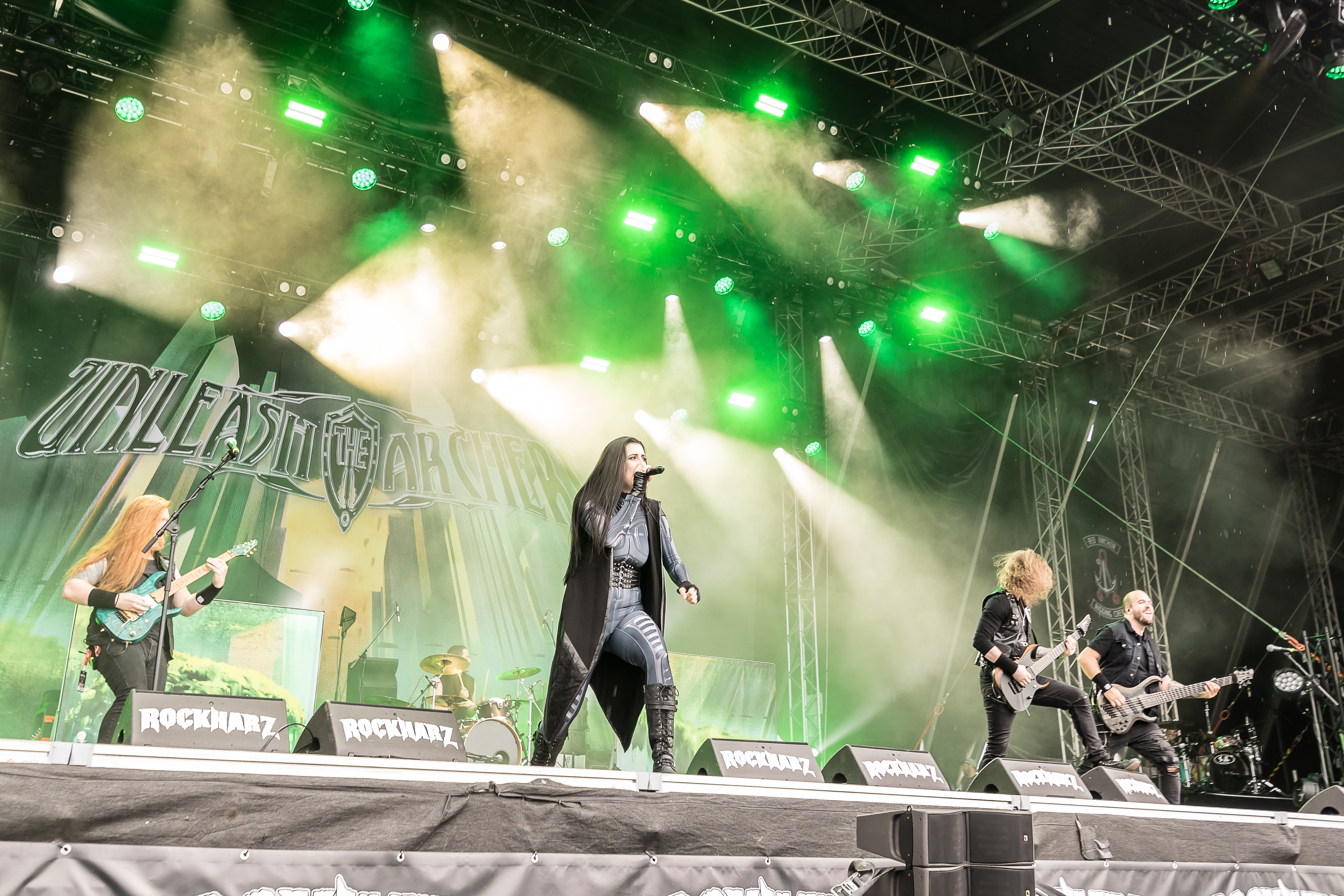
- Unleash the Archers at Rockharz Open Air 2024 in Germany

Background information
- Origin: British Columbia, Canada
- Genres: Power metal, melodic death metal, heavy metal
- Years active: 2007–present
- Label: Napalm
- Members: Brittney Slayes; Scott Buchanan; Grant Truesdell; Andrew Kingsley; Nick Miller
- Past members: Mike Selman; Zahk Hedstrom; Brad Kennedy; Brayden Dyczkowski; Kyle Sheppard; Nikko Whitworth
- Website: unleashthearchers.com

Unleash the Archers is a Canadian power metal band formed in British Columbia in 2007. They also mix in elements of melodic death metal and traditional heavy metal. The band has released six studio albums.

== History ==
=== 2007–2015: Formation and indie years ===
Unleash the Archers was formed in late 2007 by vocalist Brittney Slayes and drummer Scott Buchanan with former member Brayden Dyczkowski on guitar, with whom Scott had previously played in an independent death metal project. Former member Mike Selman was brought on after he departed from Canadian death metal band Meatlocker Seven. The position of bass player was unfilled for the first few months of Unleash the Archers' career until Zahk Hedstrom joined in October 2007 to complete the lineup. In late 2008, the band recorded a self-titled four-song demo, which featured two songs they would end up re-recording for their first studio album.

Their debut studio album, Behold the Devastation, was recorded with Jason Hywell Martin at Omega Mediacore Studios in Richmond, British Columbia, and released independently in August 2009. This album was the only one to feature the band's original lineup.

The band's second album, Demons of the AstroWaste, was recorded with Nick Engwer and Stu McKillop at the Hive Soundlab in Burnaby, British Columbia, and released independently in May 2011. This album included the first appearance of guitarist Grant Truesdell, who provided solos for their songs "Battle in the Shadow (of the Mountain)" and "The Outlander". He would step in as the new guitar player later that same year after the departure of Mike Selman before the recording. The album was a concept album based on the exploits of a mercenary in space and was set far into the future.

In 2012, the band released Defy the Skies. This album was a three-song EP released solely on 7-inch vinyl. A bonus fourth track titled "Arise" was given to those who pre-ordered; it was later released on the band's Bandcamp page in digital format only. This record also marked the departure of original bassist Zahk Hedstrom.

=== 2015–present: Signing with Napalm Records ===
In February 2015, the band announced their signing with Napalm Records. Soon after, the title, track listing and release date for their upcoming studio album Time Stands Still were revealed. The album was released in Europe on June 26 and in North America on July 10. It was originally slated for a late-summer or early-fall 2014 release but was pushed back after Napalm Records signed the band. It was the first album without Brayden Dyczkowski, who had been one of the main songwriters up until he parted with the band in late 2013; this lineup change had affected the band's sound and driven it towards a more traditional heavy metal direction with the addition of Andrew Kingsley, who is also trained in jazz, on guitar.

On May 26, 2015, the band released the "Tonight We Ride" video, inspired by Mad Max Beyond Thunderdome. The video was filmed in the Nevada desert, using props from the Death Guild Thunderdome camp at Burning Man.

Since leaving for a tour of Europe in November 2016, Unleash the Archers mentioned they would be recording a new album at the end of 2016. This album would be the first to include then-bassist Nikko Whitworth. The first single, "Cleanse the Bloodlines," was released on April 8, 2017. Apex was released on June 2, 2017, through Napalm Records. The album debuted at No. 3 on the iTunes metal charts, and became the first to make the Billboard charts. The album debuted at No. 9 Heatseeker, No. 29 Top Hard Music Albums, No. 29 Record Label Independent Current Albums, No. 34 Top Current Rock Albums, No. 116 Overall Digital Albums, No. 119 Top Current Albums, and No. 197 Top Albums by Strata. It also debuted at No. 12 on the Canadian Top Hard Music chart. The band announced they would be touring Europe, accompanying Orden Ogan, to promote the album in the fall of 2017, with a US tour to be announced. At the end of January, it was announced that bassist Nikko Whitworth had decided to leave the band.

Brittney Hayes gave interviews and tweeted, saying they are currently working on an EP of covers with a "bit of a UTA spin" on them.

On August 30, 2019, the band released the first single off of the EP Explorers, a cover of Stan Rogers' "Northwest Passage". The full EP was released on October 11, 2019.

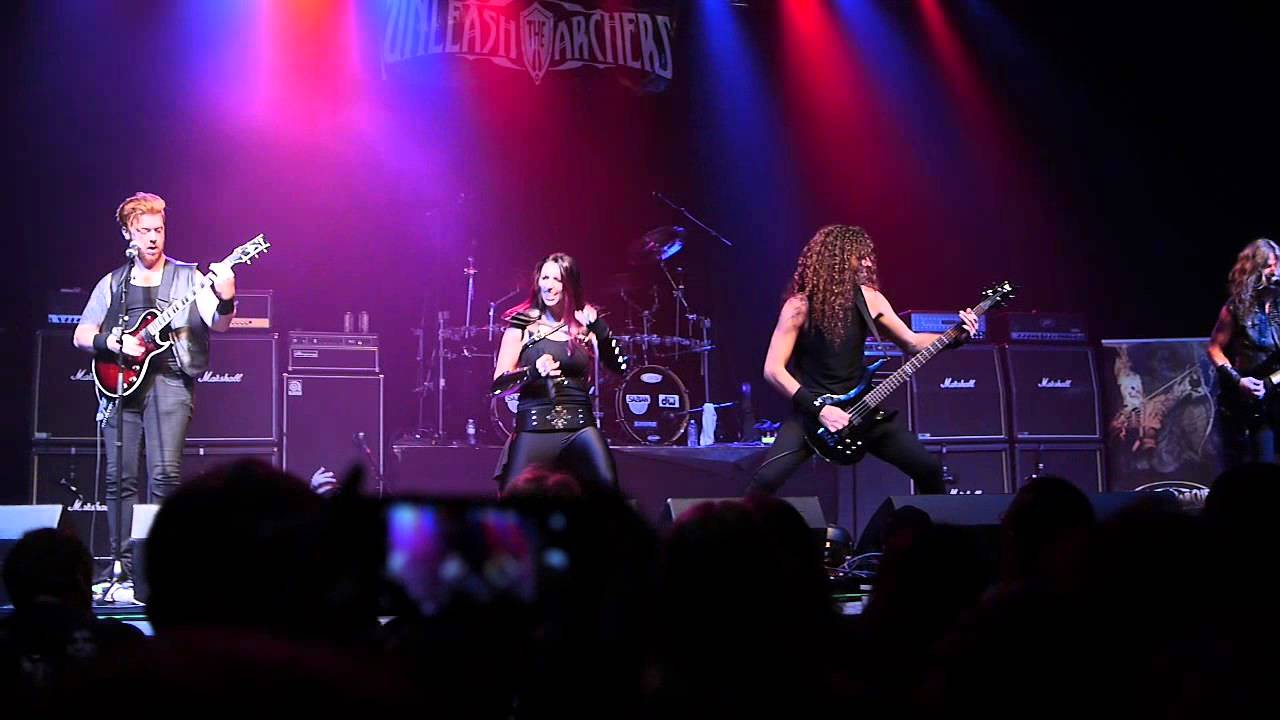
Unleash the Archers performing in 2020

In August 2020, they released their fifth full-length album, Abyss, continuing the story of Apex. They also revealed they have plans to release a graphic novel with the story told on both albums.

On December 6, 2021, they announced via social media posts that bassist Nick Miller had become a full-time member of the band. On May 3, 2022, the band announced via an Instagram post that they are in the writing phase of their next album. On November 11, 2022, Brittney Slayes commented during an Instagram livestream that their next album was also a concept album, this time with a post-apocalyptic setting and that they were aiming for a fall 2023 release. The sixth studio album, Phantoma, was later released on May 10, 2024.

== Band members ==
Current

- Brittney Slayes – clean vocals (2007–present)
- Scott Buchanan – drums (2007–present)
- Grant Truesdell – guitars, unclean vocals (2011–present)
- Andrew Kingsley Saunders – guitars, clean vocals (2014–present)
- Nick Miller – bass (2021–present, 2018–2021 touring musician)

Former

- Mike Selman – guitars (2007–2011)
- Zahk Hedstrom – bass (2007–2012)
- Brad Kennedy – bass (2012–2014)
- Brayden Dyczkowski – guitars, unclean vocals (2007–2014)
- Kyle Sheppard – bass (2014–2016)
- Nikko Whitworth – bass (2016–2018)

Timeline

== Discography ==
=== Studio albums ===
- Behold the Devastation (2009)
- Demons of the AstroWaste (2011)
- Time Stands Still (2015)
- Apex (2017)
- Abyss (2020)
- Phantoma (2024)

=== EPs ===
- Defy the Skies (2012)
- Explorers (2019)
- Abysswave (2020)
- Acoustipex (2022)

=== Videography/singles ===
- 2011: "Dawn of Ages", taken from Demons of the AstroWaste
- 2012: "General of the Dark Army" taken from Demons of the AstroWaste
- 2015: "Tonight We Ride", taken from Time Stands Still
- 2015: "Test Your Metal", taken from Time Stands Still
- 2016: "Time Stands Still", taken from Time Stands Still
- 2017: "Cleanse the Bloodlines", taken from Apex
- 2017: "Awakening", taken from Apex
- 2019: "Northwest Passage", taken from Explorers
- 2019: "Heartless World", taken from Explorers
- 2020: "Abyss", taken from Abyss
- 2020: "Soulbound", taken from Abyss
- 2020: "Faster Than Light", taken from Abyss
- 2020: "Legacy", taken from Abyss
- 2022: "Falsewave", taken from Apex (Deluxe Version)
- 2022: "Acoustipex", taken from Apex (Deluxe Version)
- 2023: "Night of the Werewolves", taken from Interludium
- 2024: "Green & Glass", taken from Phantoma
- 2024: "Ghosts In The Mist", taken from Phantoma
- 2024: "Seeking Vengeance", taken from Phantoma
- 2024: "Blood Empress", taken from Phantoma

== Awards and nominations ==
- Behold the Devastation voted No. 6 in Exclaim Magazine's Readers Choice Awards for Best Metal Albums 2009.
- Voted Best Metal Band at the Whammy Awards in Vancouver for 2015.
- Winners in the category of Metal/Hard Music Album of the Year in the 2021 Juno Awards.
