= Reidar Horghagen =

Norwegian drummer (born 1971)

Horgh
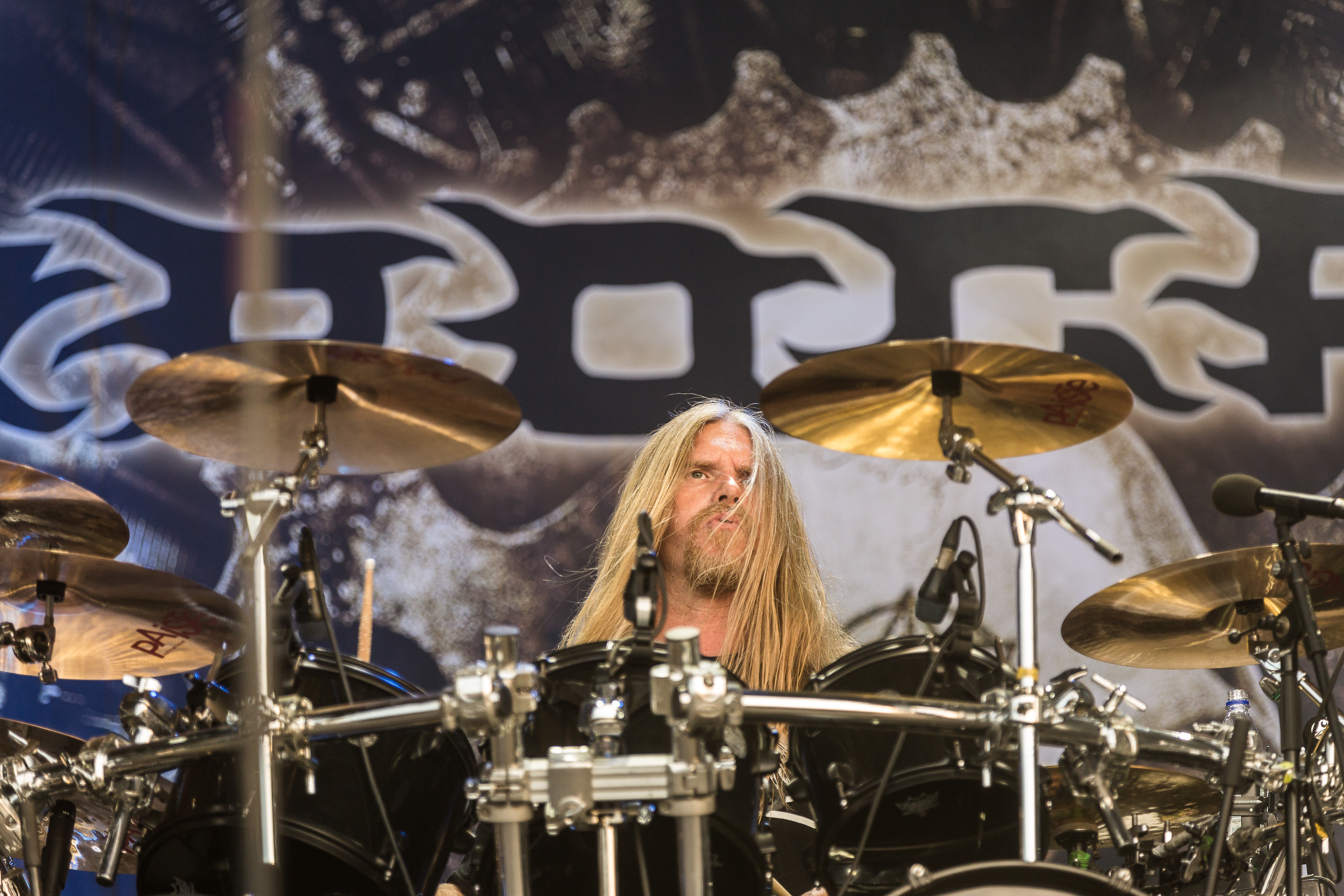
- Horgh with Hypocrisy at Rockharz, Germany 2019

Background information
- Born: Reidar Horghagen; 7 May 1971 (age 54); Bergen, Norway
- Origin: Bergen, Norway
- Genres: Black metal, death metal, melodic death metal
- Occupation: Musician
- Instrument: Drums

Reidar Horghagen (born 7 May 1971), also known professionally as Horgh, is a Norwegian drummer, formerly for Norwegian black metal band Immortal from 1996 to 2022 and Swedish death metal band Hypocrisy from 2004 until April 2022.

== Career ==
Horgh joined Immortal in 1996, bringing stability after a series of short-lived drummers. His style incorporates more straightforward metal techniques than his predecessors Abbath and Armagedda, and he has become known for his strong foot technique, displaying the ability to play very fast and maintain precise double bass drum patterns for a long period of time. The liner notes of his first Immortal album, Blizzard Beasts, dedicate the album to him.

In 2004 he joined Hypocrisy, spending over a decade playing with both bands concurrently.

He plays Pearl drums and Paiste cymbals.

== Discography ==
With Immortal

- Blizzard Beasts (1997)
- At the Heart of Winter (1999)
- Damned in Black (2000)
- Sons of Northern Darkness (2002)
- Live at BB Kings Club New York 2003 (DVD, 2005)
- All Shall Fall (2009)
- The Seventh Date of Blashyrkh (DVD, 2010)
- Northern Chaos Gods (2018)

With Grimfist

- Ghouls of Grandeur (2003)

With Hypocrisy

- Virus (2005)
- A Taste of Extreme Divinity (2009)
- Valley of the Damned / Hordes of War (Split, 2009)
- Eraser (Live) (EP, 2011)
- Hell over Sofia - 20 Years of Chaos and Confusion (DVD, 2011)
- End of Disclosure (2013)
- Worship (2021)
