= Sons of Northern Darkness =

2002 studio album by Immortal

Studio album by Immortal
- Released: 4 February 2002
- Recorded: September 2001
- Studios: The Abyss, Pärlby, Sweden
- Genre: Black metal
- Length: 50:08
- Label: Nuclear Blast
- Producer: Peter Tägtgren

Immortal chronology
Damned in Black (2000)	Sons of Northern Darkness (2002)	All Shall Fall (2009)

Sons of Northern Darkness is the seventh album by Norwegian black metal band Immortal. This was the band's first release on Nuclear Blast Records and the last to feature Iscariah on bass, who admitted to only playing bass on opening track "One by One". The rest of the album's bass tracks were played by vocalist/guitarist Abbath in what would be his last contribution on bass before departing in 2015.

The album was released in multiple formats, including a standard CD, a limited edition four-panel digipak, a limited edition metal box, a "Deluxe Edition" digipak with a bonus DVD, a picture disc, a gatefold double LP, and a quadruple 10" leather box. The limited edition metal box was only available via Nuclear Blast mail order and was sold out before it was actually released.

The song "In My Kingdom Cold" references the H.P. Lovecraft story At the Mountains of Madness.

"One by One" was featured in the soundtrack of the 8th installment in the Tony Hawk's video game series, Tony Hawk's Project 8, released in 2006.

== Critical reception ==
Professional ratings
Review scores
Source	Rating
Allmusic	4/5 stars
Chronicles of Chaos	10/10

AllMusic called it "arguably one of the best black metal releases ever put forth" and a "masterpiece".

== Track listing ==
All lyrics are written by Demonaz; all music is composed by Abbath and Horgh.

No.	Title	Length
1.	"One by One"	5:00
2.	"Sons of Northern Darkness"	4:47
3.	"Tyrants"	6:18
4.	"Demonium"	3:57
5.	"Within the Dark Mind"	7:31
6.	"In My Kingdom Cold"	7:17
7.	"Antarctica"	7:12
8.	"Beyond the North Waves"	8:06
Total length:		50:08

=== Bonus DVD ===
Recorded with a handy cam by Achim Köhler, May 2, 2003 during the Metal Gods Tour, live at B.B. King's in New York.

1. "Wrath from Above"
2. "Damned in Black"
3. "One by One"
4. "Tyrants (Part 1)"
5. "Tyrants (Part 2)"
6. "Solarfall"
7. "Beyond the North Waves"

== Personnel ==
Immortal

- Abbath Doom Occulta – vocals, guitars, bass (tracks 2–8)
- Horgh – drums
- Iscariah – bass (track 1)

Additional personnel

- Demonaz Doom Occulta (Harald Nævdal) – lyrics

== Charts ==
Chart (2002)	Peak position
German Albums Chart	58
