= Phantoma (album) =

Studio album by Unleash the Archers
- Released: 10 May 2024
- Studio: Silverside; Strathcona
- Genre: Power metal
- Length: 56:07
- Label: Napalm
- Producer: Andrew Kingsley

Unleash the Archers chronology
| Abyss (2020) | Phantoma (2024) |

Professional ratings
Review scores
| Source | Rating |
|---|---|
| Blabbermouth.net | 8.5/10 stars |

Phantoma is the sixth studio album by Canadian power metal group Unleash the Archers, released by Napalm Records on 10 May 2024.

== Concept ==
Vancouver Sun described the album as "The song cycle follows the quest of the album's protagonist, Phantoma, a fit Phase 4/ Network Tier O unit — a model A sentient AI coming to grips with a grim, dystopian planet Earth. Drawing on familiar tropes of humanity's disregard for its home, the impacts of its creations and the "manufactured sheen of social-media posturing."

== Reception ==
Tuonela Magazine described the album as "Album opener 'Human Era' sets the tone with imagery of a bleak, windswept futurescape that crescendos headlong into the breakneck pace of power metal bastion 'Ph4/NT0mA' – a masterwork of dueling guitar solos and vocal acrobatics. Trad-metal influenced 'Buried in Code' lights the way with pummeling rhythms before the album's path turns dark on heavy metal hardened 'The Collective,' with Brittney Slayes' warm tones inviting the listener to 'join or stand aside'! Hair-raising first single 'Green & Glass' unveils the truth before the upbeat '80s flavored 'Gods in Decay' and the extraordinary balladic anthem 'Give It Up or Give It All' showcase the varied songwriting prowess of Unleash the Archers' modern era. A trifecta of concept closers begins with the moody 'Ghosts in the Mist,' leading into the soaring yet menacing "Seeking Vengeance" before closing with the bittersweet tale of 'Blood Empress.'"

== Track listing ==
All tracks are written by Unleash the Archers.

Phantoma track listing
| No. | Title | Length |
|---|---|---|
| 1. | "Human Era" | 5:40 |
| 2. | "Ph4/NT0mA" | 6:30 |
| 3. | "Buried in Code" | 3:39 |
| 4. | "The Collective" | 5:53 |
| 5. | "Green & Glass" | 5:30 |
| 6. | "Gods in Decay" | 5:02 |
| 7. | "Give It Up or Give It All" | 7:35 |
| 8. | "Ghosts in the Mist" | 5:46 |
| 9. | "Seeking Vengeance" | 5:22 |
| 10. | "Blood Empress" | 5:10 |
| Total length: | | 56:07 |

Japanese edition bonus tracks
| No. | Title | Writer(s) | Length |
|---|---|---|---|
| 11. | "Ghosts in the Wave" | | 5:35 |
| 12. | "Tarzan Boy" | Maurizio Bassi and Naimy Hackett | 5:33 |
| Total length: | | | 67:15 |

== Personnel ==
Unleash the Archers

- Andrew Kingsley – guitar, production, recording
- Nick Miller – bass
- Brittney Slayes – clean vocals
- Scott Buchanan – drums
- Grant Truesdell – guitar, screamed vocals

Additional personnel

- JJ Heath – recording
- Kvzky – additional vocal recording
- Jacob Hansen – mixing, mastering
- Shimon Karmel – studio photos
- Dusty Peterson – artwork
- Reese Patterson – layout, design
- Jonah Weingarten – piano and keyboards on "Give It Up or Give It All"

== Charts ==
Chart performance for Phantoma
| Chart (2024) | Peak position |
|---|---|
| Austrian Albums (Ö3 Austria) | 20 |
| German Albums (Offizielle Top 100) | 33 |
| Scottish Albums (OCC) | 67 |
| Swiss Albums (Schweizer Hitparade) | 62 |
| UK Album Downloads (OCC) | 20 |
| UK Independent Albums (OCC) | 14 |
| UK Rock & Metal Albums (OCC) | 4 |
