= Abbath =

Norwegian musician (born 1973)

Olve Eikemo
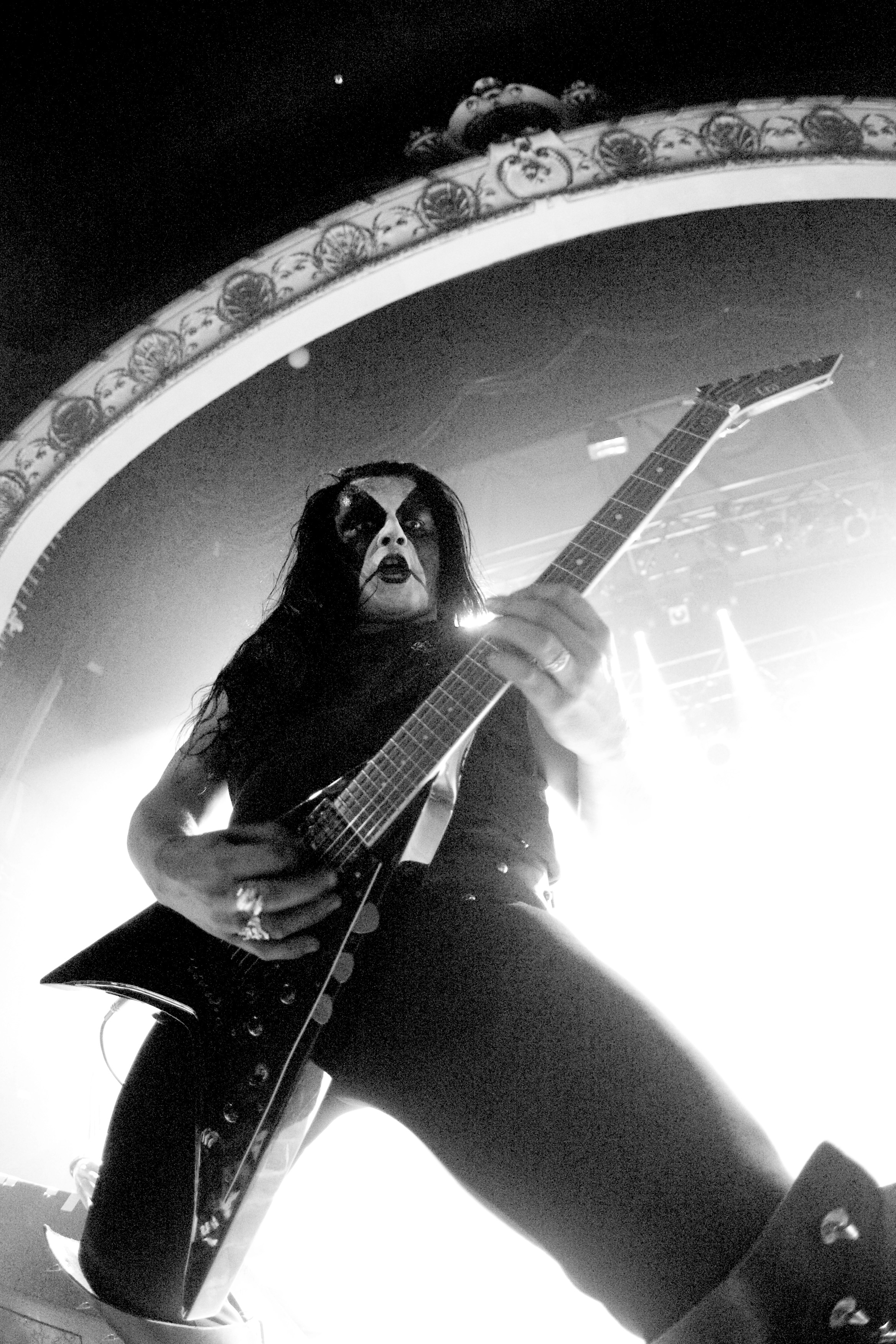
- Olve Eikemo (Abbath) in Toronto, 2010

Background information
- Also known as: Abbath Doom Occulta
- Born: Olve Eikemo; 27 June 1973 (age 53); Bergen, Norway
- Genres: Black metal; death metal; thrash metal
- Occupations: Musician; songwriter
- Instruments: Vocals; guitar; bass; drums
- Years active: 1988–present
- Formerly of: Old Funeral; Immortal; I

Olve Eikemo (born 27 June 1973), better known by his stage name Abbath Doom Occulta or simply Abbath, is a Norwegian musician best known as a founding member of the black metal band Immortal. Before founding Immortal, Abbath performed with Old Funeral alongside future Immortal member Demonaz. Following his departure from Immortal in 2015, he announced that he would be forming a new band under the Abbath name. Although primarily a guitarist, Abbath is also a proficient bassist and drummer, having started his career as a bassist and recorded all drums for the Immortal albums Pure Holocaust and Battles in the North.

== Early life ==
Olve was born in Odda Municipality and grew up in Lysefjorden in Os Municipality, outside of Bergen, Norway. As a young boy, he was an avid fan of hard rock band Kiss and his first heavy metal album was Creatures of the Night, which made him feel "immortal". He started his musical career with the band Old Funeral. He cites getting his first Venom video and Bathory album as a turning point in his musical development towards black metal.

== Projects ==
=== Immortal ===
Immortal was formed in 1991 by Abbath and Demonaz, alongside other former members of the extreme metal bands Old Funeral and Amputation. At various times throughout the band's history, Abbath has been the lead vocalist, bassist, guitarist, keyboardist, drummer, and lyricist, due to the difficulties of upholding a stable line-up. During Immortal's early years, Abbath originally served as the band's vocalist, bassist and studio drummer, while Demonaz played guitar. A steady-lineup was secured for a brief time when drummer Horgh joined Immortal. After the release of Blizzard Beasts in 1997, Demonaz was diagnosed with acute tendinitis, and was consequently forced to quit as guitarist, but remained as lyricist and band manager. Immortal released At the Heart of Winter in 1999, with Abbath taking over guitar and bass duties. This album marked a large shift in sound and style for the music of Immortal. In 2000, the band released Damned in Black, with Iscariah on bass. Sons of Northern Darkness was released in 2002, with the same lineup. Soon after the release of the album, Immortal decided to split and cited personal reasons for their break-up.

In early May 2006, Abbath announced that Immortal would reunite. In regard to when Immortal would start playing live again, Abbath said:

I didn't really want to say it, but I don't give a shit. We will come back, stronger than ever. I've met with Horgh for the first time in over a year. He's built his new house here, right around the corner. In the next few days we will begin to rehearse our old 'Blizzard Beasts' classics. I'm already really hot on the idea. Immortal are timeless frost. One year more or less doesn't make a difference. We have all the time in the world.

— Abbath, Rock Hard

A comeback tour followed the reunion with shows in Europe in 2007 and the band's first tour of Australia and New Zealand in 2008. A new Immortal album, All Shall Fall, was released in autumn of 2009. The band's performance at Wacken Open Air in 2007 was recorded and filmed for the release of the 2010 video album The Seventh Date of Blashyrkh. Abbath left Immortal in 2015 after a legal battle with the other members over the rights to the band's trademark.

=== I ===
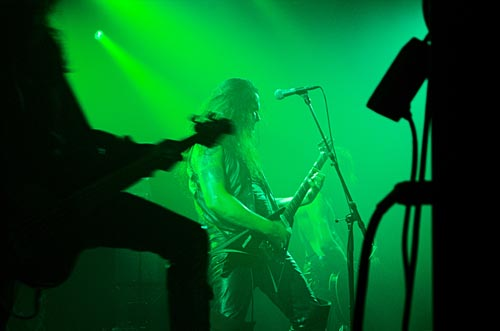
I live at Hole in the Sky 2006

Following Immortal's break-up in 2003, Abbath began working on a new project called I that same year. Abbath served as vocalist and guitarist, and was joined by former Immortal drummer Armagedda, Gorgoroth bassist King ov Hell, Enslaved guitarist Arve Isdal, and then-former Immortal guitarist Demonaz as lyricist. The band released their debut album Between Two Worlds in 2006 and performed their only concert at that year's Hole in the Sky festival in Bergen.

=== Abbath ===
After leaving Immortal in 2015, Abbath formed a new eponymous band and released their first self-titled album in early 2016. Abbath followed up their debut with the album Outstrider in 2019. Their latest album, Dread Reaver, was released in 2022.

=== Bömbers ===
Bömbers is a Motörhead tribute band formed in 1996. The band consists of childhood friends Abbath "Killminister" on lead vocals and bass, Tore "Fast Tore" Bratseth (of Old Funeral and The Battalion) on guitars, and Jan Terje "Pez" "Party Animal" Pedersen (Punishment Park and Jef) on drums. Motörhead frontman Lemmy attended Bömbers' show at Garage in 1997 after his band's show in Bergen. Abbath left Bömbers in late 2000 to focus on Immortal and returned after their break-up in 2003. Nicola "Morrigan" Trier (of Aeternus) filled in on bass in his absence while Bratseth handled vocal duties. In 2005, Bömbers released the EP Bergen with covers of "Bomber", "No Class" and "Dead Men Tell No Tales". During the Inferno Metal Festival in 2007, Abbath joined the German thrash metal band Sodom on stage and performed a cover of Motörhead's "Ace of Spades". In October 2024, Bömbers announced that the band had split up due to personal differences.

== Personal life ==
=== Alcohol issues ===
The 2019 South American tour of Abbath was abruptly cancelled mid-tour, after during a show at Argentina, Abbath appeared to behave erratically and "too drunk to perform"; the tour was cancelled the next day and Abbath announced entering rehab later that month.

== Equipment ==
As of 2015, Abbath endorses Schecter Guitars. His signature model, RavenDark V, was released in 2017. Abbath has used the following guitars and basses throughout his career:

- Schecter RavenDark V FR Abbath signature model
- Schecter E-1 FR
- LTD DV8-R (modified with a Floyd Rose tremolo system)
- LTD V-401DX (with Seymour Duncan pickups)
- GHL Jackson Randy Rhoads copy
- Rickenbacker 4001 Bass
- B.C. Rich Ironbird Bass
- Westone Thunder I Bass

Abbath uses an ENGL Ritchie Blackmore Signature E650 amp through either direct line in or a Marshall cabinet.

== In popular culture ==
Abbath served as an inspiration for the appearance of the character Lars Ümlaüt from the video game series Guitar Hero. The character wears many of the same on-stage outfits as Abbath and has nearly identical corpse paint. Abbath appeared in the 2008 documentary Until the Light Takes Us about early Norwegian black metal along with Demonaz. Jester King Brewery in Austin, Texas has an Abbath-inspired character on the label of their Black Metal Imperial stout.

== Discography ==
Immortal

- Diabolical Fullmoon Mysticism (1992)
- Pure Holocaust (1993)
- Battles in the North (1995)
- Blizzard Beasts (1997)
- At the Heart of Winter (1999)
- Damned in Black (2000)
- Sons of Northern Darkness (2002)
- All Shall Fall (2009)

I

- Between Two Worlds (2006)

Abbath

- Abbath (2016)
- Outstrider (2019)
- Dread Reaver (2022)

Bömbers

- Bergen (2005)

Old Funeral

- The Fart That Should Not Be (1989)
- Abduction of Limbs (1990)

Dimmu Borgir

- Death Cult Armageddon (2003) - backing vocals on "Progenies of the Great Apocalypse" and "Heavenly Perverse"

Enslaved

- Isa (2004) - backing vocals on "Lunar Force"

The Battalion

- Stronghold Of Men (2008) - backing vocals on "Detonate" and "Man To Man (Warfare)"
