= Immortal (band) =

Norwegian black metal band

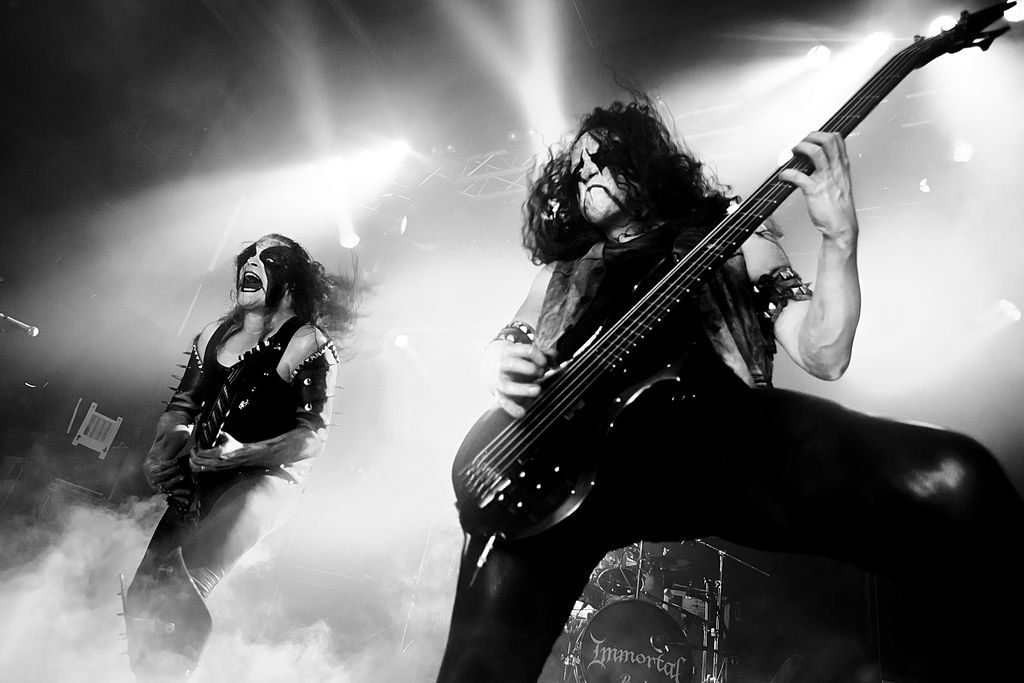
- Former members Abbath (left) and Apollyon performing at Hole in the Sky festival in 2011

Background information
- Origin: Bergen, Norway
- Genre: Black metal
- Years active: 1991–2003; 2006–present
- Labels: Nuclear Blast; Osmose
- Spinoffs: I; Abbath
- Spinoff of: Old Funeral
- Members: Demonaz Doom Occulta
- Past members: Abbath Doom Occulta; Armagedda; Grim; Horgh; Iscariah; Apollyon
- Website: immortalofficial.com

Immortal is a Norwegian black metal band from Bergen. The group was founded in 1991 by frontman and bassist (later guitarist) Abbath Doom Occulta (Olve Eikemo) and guitarist Demonaz Doom Occulta (Harald Nævdal). The pair worked with various drummers (including Grim, Armagedda and Hellhammer), and were joined by former drummer Horgh (Reidar Horghagen) in 1996.

In March 2015, Abbath announced his departure from the group following a dispute with the other members. He formed a new band, also called Abbath. It was reported that following Abbath's departure, the band would split up. However, in August 2015, Demonaz and Horgh said that the band would continue without Abbath. Demonaz returned to playing guitar with the band for the first time since 1997, and would sing as well. Northern Chaos Gods was officially released on 6 July 2018 through Nuclear Blast Records. Although the band has been a trio for most of its history, several albums have been recorded as a duo, with varying combinations of Abbath, Demonaz, and Horgh.

In 2016, the staff of Loudwire named them the 44th-best metal band of all time.

== History ==
=== First three albums (1991–1996) ===
Immortal originated in two short-lived bands, Old Funeral and Amputation, in the late 1980s. Old Funeral was founded by Abbath and Tore Bratseth and went through several guitarists, including Demonaz, Varg Vikernes and Jørn Inge Tunsberg, until disbanding in 1992. Demonaz and Jørn formed Amputation, which released two demos with Demonaz on guitar and vocals, Jørn on guitars, and drummer Padden, before disbanding in 1990.

Members of Old Funeral and Amputation formed Immortal in 1991, with Abbath on bass and lead vocals, Demonaz on guitar, Jørn on guitar and drummer Armagedda. The music on their early demos was death metal, with lyrics influenced by Morbid Angel and Possessed. The band was influenced by Mayhem guitarist Euronymous and bands like Bathory and Celtic Frost. They released their self-titled EP in 1991, which was a stylistic change to black metal. This was followed by their debut album, Diabolical Fullmoon Mysticism, in 1992, which maintained the black metal sound of the previous year.

Their second full-length album, Pure Holocaust, was released in 1993, and featured more polished production than their debut, with fast songs and lyrics based on evil and darkness. It is held in high regard within the black metal genre. Battles in the North, released in 1995, was a continuation of its predecessor, with extreme tempos and lyrics about cold winter landscapes.

In 1995, the band released two video clips directed by British artist David Palser, entitled Masters of Nebulah Frost, through Osmose Productions. They featured bizarrely-shot images of frozen landscapes and vast forests with the band performing two songs from Battles in the North, "Grim and Frostbitten Kingdoms" and "Blashyrkh (Mighty Ravendark)", on a Norwegian mountainside.

The video for "Grim and Frostbitten Kingdoms" features Mayhem drummer, Hellhammer (Jan Axel Blomberg). These clips have become a template for other bands, similarly to how "The Call of the Wintermoon" is also influential.

=== Blizzard Beasts and At the Heart of Winter (1996–1999) ===
Blizzard Beasts, released in 1997, introduced technical thrash with shorter, tighter songs, though it contained the lengthy "Mountains of Might" and continued the themes of cold and winter.

Apart from Abbath and Demonaz, Immortal did not find a stable lineup until 1996, when drummer Horgh joined. He is credited on the album Blizzard Beasts. In 1997, Demonaz suffered acute tendinitis in his arm and was unable to play. Abbath took over guitar. Demonaz continued writing lyrics and has been a manager for the band, accompanying them on tour, releasing updates, and giving interviews.

Abbath and Horgh wrote and recorded At the Heart of Winter. Immortal's early full-length releases were traditional black metal. At the Heart of Winter marks the period when the band began to experiment with a fusion of black metal and German thrash metal, resulting in the sound of Immortal's later works. During the tours for this album, the band recruited bassist Iscariah and made him a full-time member.

Erik "Grim" Brødreskift committed suicide in 1999. Grim appeared on the cover of Pure Holocaust and is credited as the drummer (though he did not play on the album), and toured with Immortal. The band frequently headlined the Hole in the Sky festival in his memory.

=== Damned in Black and Sons of Northern Darkness (2000–2003) ===
The next album, Damned in Black, resembled their old style. It was well received, but is frequently overlooked for coming between At the Heart of Winter and Sons of Northern Darkness. In 2000, the EP Immortal was repackaged as part of the True Kings of Norway compilation by Spinefarm Records. That year, Immortal signed with Nuclear Blast, which didn't affect their style, as evidenced by Sons of Northern Darkness. Two months later, Iscariah left the band and was replaced with Saroth for the next few months.

They appeared at Wacken Open Air in August of 2002.

=== Split (2003–2007) ===
Immortal split during the summer of 2003 for personal reasons. Following the split, Abbath worked on new material that same year. He enlisted Enslaved guitarist Ice Dale (Arve Isdal), Gorgoroth bassist King ov Hell, and original Immortal drummer Armagedda for a new band named I, while Demonaz wrote the lyrics. The band released Between Two Worlds in November 2006.

In early June 2006, German magazine Rock Hard reported that Abbath, Demonaz and Horgh would reform Immortal and start touring in 2007. Abbath was quoted as saying,

I didn't really want to say it, but I don't give a shit. We will come back, stronger than ever. I've met with Horgh for the first time in over a year. He's built his new house here, right around the corner. In the next few days we will begin to rehearse our old 'Blizzard Beasts' classics. I'm already really hot on the idea. Immortal are timeless frost. One year more or less doesn't make a difference. We have all the time in the world.

=== Reunion and All Shall Fall (2007–2014) ===
In 2007, Immortal reunited for a string of summer shows. They headlined the Inferno Festival in April, the Tuska Open Air festival in June/July, Metal Camp festival in July, and the Wacken Open Air festival in August. They performed twice in the United States in July 2007. Filling in as bassist for these dates was Aura Noir bassist Apollyon. Immortal toured Australia and New Zealand in March 2008.

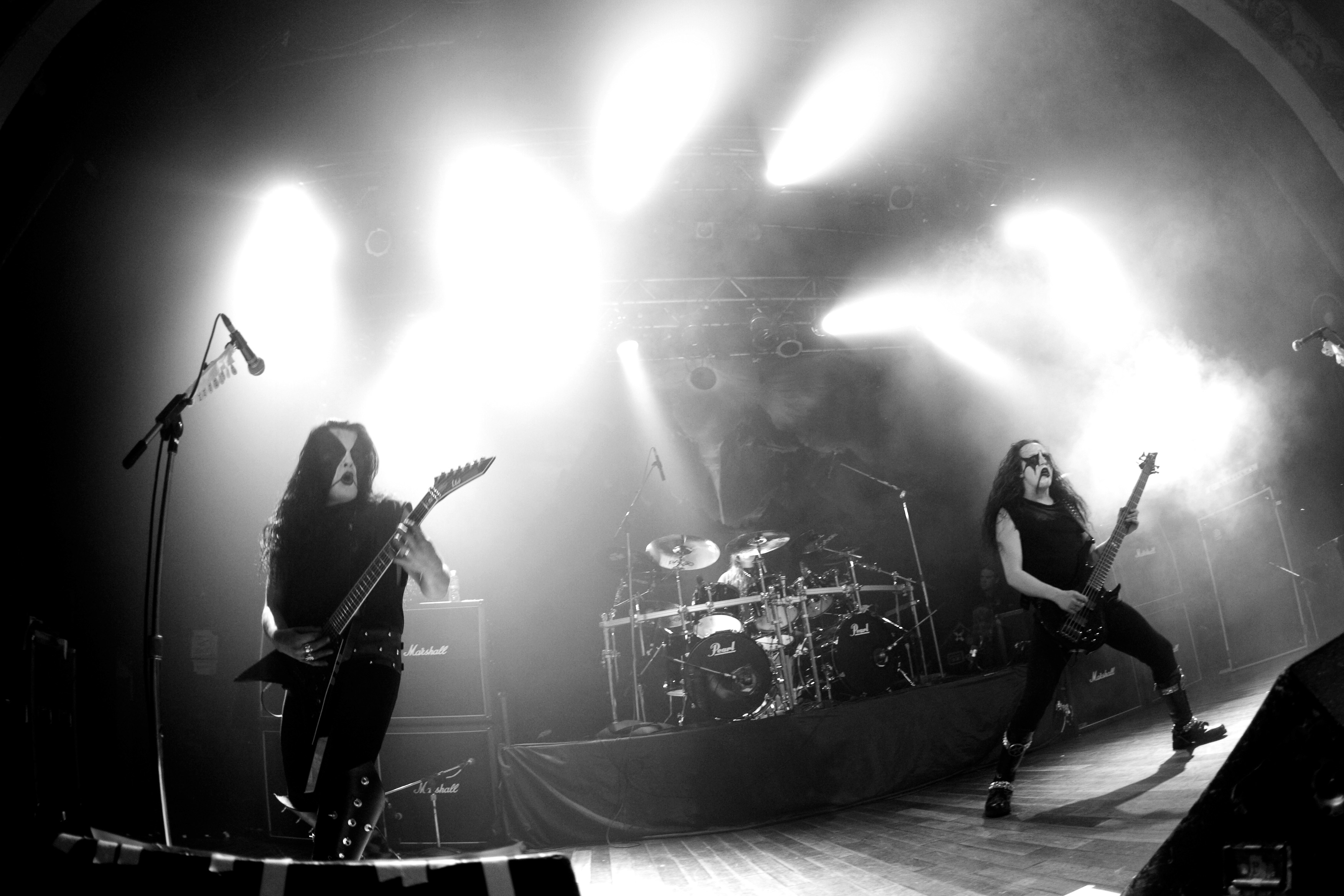
Immortal in 2010

After the reunion, Abbath and Horgh reformed the band permanently. Demonaz confirmed this in an interview with Eternal Terror. Apollyon was the permanent replacement for Iscariah, and the three began working with Demonaz on All Shall Fall, recorded in April–May 2009 and released on 25 September 2009.

According to a Decibel magazine interview, work had begun on Immortal's ninth album, stating in the article that "four new songs already in the works for a follow-up to All Shall Fall".

Abbath and Demonaz were interviewed in the 2009 American documentary by Aaron Aites and Audrey Ewell, Until the Light Takes Us.

=== Legal battle, Abbath's exit, and Northern Chaos Gods (2014–2020) ===
The members of Immortal were involved in a legal battle with each other over the rights to the Immortal trademark. They were also due to submit a new album to the Nuclear Blast label, though little information regarding the album and its release had been disclosed. It is confirmed, however, by Abbath that the album had been completed with the aid of various musicians.

In March 2015, Abbath left Immortal as a result of this conflict and an inability to move forward. Abbath has continued to record and perform as a solo act under his name.

On 8 January 2018, the band posted via Facebook an update on Immortal's upcoming ninth full-length, stating "We have put a massive amount of energy into this, and wanted to deliver our absolutely best. It has been a pleasure to finish the studio process and most of all being stoked about the final result. Peter Tägtgren has done an outstanding job in producing and mixing it. We now look forward to have it released, and are excited to share our 9th full length with you all." The album was released under Nuclear Blast Records as Northern Chaos Gods on 6 July 2018. The album features original member Demonaz on vocals and guitar. Tägtgren played bass on the album, with the exact timing of Apollyon's departure being unclear.

=== Legal battle, Horgh's exit, and War Against All (2020–2024) ===
In August 2020, it was announced that Demonaz and Horgh were involved with a legal dispute over the rights to the band's name. Demonaz had registered the name with the Norwegian Patent Office as his exclusive trademark in July 2019, which was approved; however, Horgh chose to appeal the registration, and the matter was ruled in his favor, meaning that Demonaz no longer has the exclusive right to the Immortal name. Horgh was unaware of the initial sole registration made by Demonaz.

On 24 October 2022, the band announced that their tenth studio album, War Against All, would be released in 2023. It was also revealed that Demonaz was listed as the only member of the band, indicating that he won the dispute of the rights to the band's name against Horgh. In March 2023, the band released the title track to the album, which was revealed to be coming out on 26 May.

=== Eleventh studio album (2025-Present) ===
In 2026, it was reported the band have now finished work on their eleventh studio album, with its release set for 2027.

== Lyrical style ==
Immortal's lyrics are based on an overall theme, a realm called Blashyrkh which is said to be "demon-and-battle-filled" and a "fusion of gothic, Nordic, and heroic themes." The idea for Blashyrkh came about from Demonaz and Abbath's feelings of isolation living in Bergen. They created Blashyrkh to mirror those feelings, basing it on Norway, including "winter landscapes", "the woods, the mountains, the darkness, the fog", and "glacial valleys". When writing lyrics, the band's lyricist Demonaz often takes long walks in the Norwegian countryside near his hometown of Bergen for inspiration. Unlike many early black metal bands, Immortal does not have satanic-themed lyrics, opting instead for basing the genre's inherent concepts of darkness and evil in the fantasy setting of Blashyrkh. However, on the band's first album, there were a few satanic references but without any lyrics attacking religion.

== Band members ==
=== Current ===
- Demonaz Doom Occulta (Harald Nævdal) – lyrics (1991–present), guitars (1991–1997, 2015–present), vocals (2015–present)

=== Former ===
- Abbath Doom Occulta (Olve Eikemo) – vocals (1991–2003, 2006–2015), guitars (1998–2003, 2006–2015), bass (1991–1998), studio drums (1993–1995)
- Jørn Inge Tunsberg – guitars (1991)
- Armagedda (Gerhard Herfindal) – drums (1991–1992)
- Grim (Erik Brødreskift) – drums (1993–1994; died 1999)
- Horgh (Reidar Horghagen) – drums (1996–2003, 2006–2022)
- Iscariah (Stian Smørholm) – bass (1999–2002)
- Apollyon (Ole Jørgen Moe) – bass (2007–2015)

=== Live ===
- Kolgrim (a.k.a. Padden) (Jan Atle Åserød) – drums (1992–1993)
- Hellhammer (Jan Axel Blomberg) – drums (1995)
- Ares (Ronny Hovland) – bass (1998)
- Saroth (Yngve Liljebäck) – bass (2002–2003)

== Discography ==
=== Studio albums ===
- Diabolical Fullmoon Mysticism (1992)
- Pure Holocaust (1993)
- Battles in the North (1995)
- Blizzard Beasts (1997)
- At the Heart of Winter (1999)
- Damned in Black (2000)
- Sons of Northern Darkness (2002)
- All Shall Fall (2009)
- Northern Chaos Gods (2018)
- War Against All (2023)

=== Other releases ===
- Untitled demo (1991)
- Immortal (EP, 1991)
- Masters of Nebulah Frost (VHS, 1995)
- True Kings of Norway (5-way split, 2000)
- Live at BB Kings Club New York (DVD, 2003)
- Valley of the Damned / Hordes of War (2-way split, 2009)
- The Seventh Date of Blashyrkh (DVD, 2010)
