= Rom 5:12 =

Studio album by Marduk
- Released: April 24, 2007
- Recorded: December 2006 – January 2007
- Genre: Black metal
- Length: 55:28
- Label: Regain Records
- Producer: Marduk

Marduk chronology
Plague Angel (2004)	Rom 5:12 (2007)	Wormwood (2009)

Professional ratings
Review scores
Source	Rating
About.com	4.5/5 stars
AllMusic	3.5/5 stars
Blabbermouth	8.5/10 stars
Metal Hammer	9/10 stars

Rom 5:12 is the tenth studio album by Swedish black metal band Marduk. It was recorded and mixed between December 2006 and January 2007 and released on April 24, 2007 by Regain Records. The CD version of the album includes a 44-page booklet, and the LP and picture disc pressings were limited to 500 copies each. Rom 5:12 is the last Marduk album to feature Emil Dragutinovic. Just as the previous album Plague Angel, it features a second collaboration with the Martial Industrial band Arditi.

In its native Sweden, the album received a 8 out of 10 score from Dagens Skiva, and 4 out of 5 from Sydsvenskan. Dagens Nyheter opined that the band did not break new ground, but that Rom 5:12 surpassed Marduk's four previous albums and was nearing the 1990s highlights Those of the Unlight and Nightwing.

== Track listing ==
No.	Title	Length
1.	"The Levelling Dust"	5:11
2.	"Cold Mouth Prayer"	3:28
3.	"Imago mortis"	8:36
4.	"Through the Belly of Damnation"	4:19
5.	"1651"	4:54
6.	"Limbs of Worship"	4:24
7.	"Accuser/Opposer"	8:43
8.	"Vanity of Vanities"	3:40
9.	"Womb of Perishableness"	7:01
10.	"Voices from Avignon"	5:08

== Credits ==
=== Marduk ===
- Mortuus (Daniel Rostén) – vocals; artwork, songwriting (2 & 7)
- Evil (Morgan Steinmeyer Håkansson) – guitar
- Devo (Magnus Andersson) – bass

=== Additional personnel ===
- Emil Dragutinovic – (drums on tracks 1, 2, 4, 6, 8 & 10)
- A. Gustafsson (Jens Gustafsson) – (drums on tracks 3, 7 & 9)
- Joakim Göthberg – guest vocals on "Cold Mouth Prayer"
- Naihmass Nemtheanga – guest vocals on "Accuser/Opposer"
- Arditi – performance on "1651"

== Charts ==
Chart (2007)	Peak position
French Albums (SNEP)	198

Chart (2020)	Peak position
German Albums (Offizielle Top 100)	57
