= Daniel Rostén =

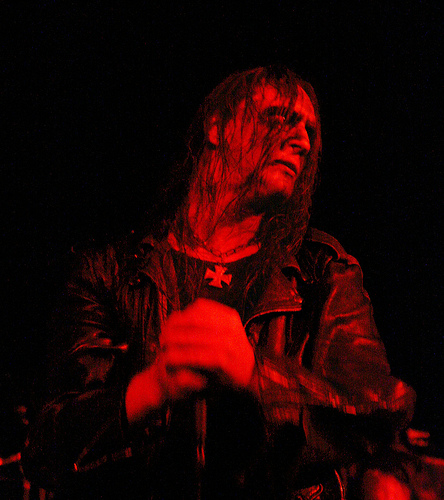
- Mortuus in Arnhem, 2007

Background information
- Also known as: Arioch, Mortuus
- Born: Daniel Hans Johan Rostén; 26 April 1977 (age 48)
- Genres: Black metal
- Occupation: Musician
- Instrument(s): Vocals, guitar, bass
- Years active: 1993–present

Daniel Hans Johan Rostén (born 1977) is a Swedish black metal vocalist, guitarist, and bassist, known as the frontman for Funeral Mist and singer/guitarist of Triumphator under the stage name Arioch, and for having been the vocalist for renowned Swedish black metal band Marduk since 2004 under the stage name Mortuus. He is also a professional graphic designer.

== Biography ==
=== Early years (1994–2004) ===
Daniel Rostén in 1993 had a solo band called Winds but never released anything and would later dissolve the project. Rostén joined Funeral Mist under the "Arioch" pseudonym as bassist in the summer of 1994, before the band's first demo recordings. Once all old members left, Rostén led the band and recorded the second demo Havoc in summer/autumn 1996 with the new drummer Necromorbus (Tore Stjerna). With Necromorbus, Rostén would also record and release the EP Devilry in 1998 through Shadow Records. Rostén would later bring guitarist Nachash to record Salvation, Funeral Mist's debut album, which was released through Norma Evangelium Diaboli in 2003, Funeral Mist has been signed to that label ever since. Arioch also played guitar and sung in Triumphator in the 1990s and contributed the lyrics to the French band Antaeus' song Sanctus, released on De Principii Evangelikum in 2002. Rostén and his social circle were notorious in the Stockholm metal scene in the late 1990s and early 2000s due to their antisocial activities.

Rostén runs Holy Poison Design, a graphic design company which has done artwork for a variety of black metal artists, most notably Teitanblood, Ofermod and Behemoth, as well as being Marduk's in-house graphic artist for their albums' artworks and merchandise since 2007.

=== Marduk and other projects (2004 onward) ===
In 2004, Rostén joined Marduk as vocalist prior to the completion of the band's album Plague Angel, replacing longtime vocalist Legion. Marduk's founder and guitarist Morgan Håkansson had contributed the lyrics to the Triumphator song Heralds of Pestilence. Mortuus introduced a decidedly distinct and different vocal style to Marduk to that of his predecessor, and it was due to his credentials as vocalist in Funeral Mist that Håkansson contacted Rostén by telephone. After careful consideration Rostén accepted Håkansson's offer to join Marduk. In contrast to Legion, Håkansson has stated that Rostén has shared his interest in enthusiasm for Marduk's lyrical content, which has notably consisted of subject matter such as Biblical tales, Third Reich history and World War II.

In 2012, Mortuus also sang on Merrimack's album The Acausal Mass, as the band's member Perversifier stated after Rock Hard journalist Jan Jaedike compared some of Merrimack's material to "the least comfortable stuff of Marduk with Mortuus". He was not mentioned in the album's booklet though because Merrimack did not want to use his name for promotion.

In 2009 Rostén released the second Funeral Mist record Maranatha, the third album, Hekatomb was released in 2018 after a protracted period of silence, after which, the project's fourth album, Deiform was released near the end of 2021. In 2012 Rostén also started a new solo project called DomJord, which focuses on electronic music but didn't release its debut album Sporer until March 13, 2020 through Vidfare Productions in collaboration with Norma Evangelium Diaboli and The Ajna Offensive. Rósten released the second DomJord record, Gravrost on November 13, 2020, again through Vidfare Productions.

=== Controversy ===
In December 2009 Rostén, while performing live at the DNA Lounge in San Francisco, a shirtless fan who was drunk approached Rostén onstage trying to hug him, Mortuus grabbed the man by the head, flipped him over onto his back on the stage, and pushed him off it. This incident was recorded on video and was subject to mixed reception from observers.

=== Views on black metal ===
Arioch points out that "A band that claims to play Black Metal must always have Satanism and nothing but Satanism as the highest priority in their music and concept as well as in their personal lives" and that neither the voice, nor the sound and musical style make a black metal band. He considers "[d]estructive Satanism and fanatic Devil worship" to be "the very foundation of everything labelled 'Black Metal'".

== Discography ==
=== With Funeral Mist ===
- see Funeral Mist

=== With Triumphator ===
- see Triumphator (band)

=== With Marduk ===
- Plague Angel (2004)
- Deathmarch (2004)
- Warschau (2006)
- Rom 5:12 (2007)
- Wormwood (2009)
- Iron Dawn (2011)
- Serpent Sermon (2012)
- Frontschwein (2015)
- Viktoria (2018)
- Memento Mori (2023)

=== With DomJord ===
- Sporer (2020)
- Gravrost (2020)

=== With Antaeus ===
- De Principii Evangelikum (lyrics for Sanctus, 2002)

=== With Merrimack ===
- The Acausal Mass (guest vocals, 2012)
