= Obedience (album) =

EP by Marduk
- Released: February 7, 2000
- Recorded: December 1999 at The Abyss, Pärlby, Sweden
- Genre: Black metal
- Length: 11:42
- Label: Regain Records
- Producer: Marduk

Marduk chronology
Panzer Division Marduk (1999)	Obedience (2000)	Infernal Eternal (2000)

Obedience is the third EP by Swedish black metal band Marduk. It was recorded and mixed at The Abyss in December 1999 and released on February 7, 2000. "Obedience" and "Funeral Bitch" were re-recorded for the band's 2001 album, La Grande Danse Macabre (the former being retitled "Obedience unto Death"). Peter Tägtgren, who mixed the band's previous efforts since 1996's Heaven Shall Burn... When We Are Gathered, was not involved with this recording; instead mixing was handled by Tommy Tägtgren. Peter Tägtgren returned to mixing Marduk's recordings in December 2000 when the band began recording La Grande Danse Macabre. Obedience was the first Marduk release by Regain Records.

== Track listing ==
No.	Title	Length
1.	"Obedience"	3:31
2.	"Funeral Bitch"	4:02
3.	"Into the Crypts of Rays" (Celtic Frost cover)	4:06

== Personnel ==
Marduk

- Legion – vocals
- Morgan Steinmeyer Håkansson – guitar
- B. War – bass
- Fredrik Andersson – drums

Guest

- Tommy Tägtgren – mixing
