= Within =

Within may refer to:

== Film and television ==
- "Within" (The X-Files), an episode of The X-Files
- Within (film), a 2016 American horror film

== Music ==
- Within (Protest the Hero album) (2026), by Canadian progressive metal band Protest the Hero
- Within (William Joseph album) (2004), by pianist William Joseph
- Within (Embraced album) (2000), by Swedish melodic black metal band Embraced
- "Within", a song from the album Random Access Memories by Daft Punk

== Others ==
- Within (company), a virtual reality content and technology company based in Los Angeles
