= Infernal Eternal =

Live album by Marduk
- Released: 31 October 2000
- Recorded: 7 November 1999
- Venue: La Laiterie, Strasbourg, France
- Genre: Black metal
- Length: 79:29
- Label: Regain
- Producer: Marduk

Marduk chronology
| Obedience (2000) | Infernal Eternal (2000) | La Grande Danse Macabre (2001) |

Professional ratings
Review scores
| Source | Rating |
|---|---|
| AllMusic | 1.5/5 stars |

Infernal Eternal is the second live album by Swedish black metal band Marduk. It was recorded in France during the World Panzer Battle tour and released on 31 October 2000 by Regain Records. The album title comes after a song of the same name, which appeared on Marduk's 1996 album Heaven Shall Burn... When We Are Gathered.

== Track listing ==
Disc 1
| No. | Title | Length |
|---|---|---|
| 1. | "Panzer Division Marduk" | 2:55 |
| 2. | "Burn My Coffin" | 4:24 |
| 3. | "Baptism by Fire" | 3:42 |
| 4. | "The Sun Turns Black as Night" | 3:06 |
| 5. | "Of Hell's Fire" | 5:17 |
| 6. | "502" | 3:11 |
| 7. | "Materialized in Stone" | 5:23 |
| 8. | "Beast of Prey" | 4:13 |
| 9. | "Those of the Unlight" | 4:47 |
| 10. | "Sulphur Souls" | 6:22 |
| 11. | "Dreams of Blood and Iron" | 5:59 |
| 12. | "Fistfucking God's Planet" | 3:56 |

Disc 2
| No. | Title | Length |
|---|---|---|
| 1. | "On Darkened Wings" | 4:13 |
| 2. | "Into the Crypts of Rays" (Celtic Frost cover) | 4:08 |
| 3. | "Still Fucking Dead" | 3:17 |
| 4. | "Slay the Nazarene" | 3:54 |
| 5. | "Departure from the Mortals" | 3:36 |
| 6. | "Legion" | 6:59 |

== Personnel ==
Marduk

- Legion – vocals
- Morgan Steinmeyer Håkansson – guitar
- B. War – bass
- Fredrik Andersson – drums

Guests

- David Decobert - live recording
- Joe Petagno - cover art
