= Wormwood (Marduk album) =

Studio album by Marduk
- Released: 21 September 2009
- Recorded: 2009 at Endarker Studio
- Genre: Black metal
- Length: 45:59
- Label: Regain Records
- Producer: Marduk

Marduk chronology
Rom 5:12 (2007)	Wormwood (2009)	Iron Dawn (2011)

Professional ratings
Review scores
Source	Rating
About.com	4/5 stars
AllMusic	4.5/5 stars
Blabbermouth	8.5/10 stars

Wormwood is the eleventh studio album by Swedish black metal band Marduk. It was recorded at Endarker Studio by Magnus Devo Andersson and released on 21 September in Europe and 13 October in U.S. by Regain Records. It is the first Marduk album to feature drummer Lars Broddesson. "Phosphorous Redeemer" was made available on the band's official MySpace page in the run-up to the album's release.

== Track listing ==
No.	Title	Length
1.	"Nowhere, No One, Nothing"	3:20
2.	"Funeral Dawn"	5:51
3.	"This Fleshly Void"	3:07
4.	"Unclosing the Curse"	2:15
5.	"Into Utter Madness"	4:56
6.	"Phosphorous Redeemer"	6:11
7.	"To Redirect Perdition"	6:41
8.	"Whorecrown"	5:29
9.	"Chorus of Cracking Necks"	3:47
10.	"As a Garment"	4:18

== Credits ==
=== Marduk ===
- Marduk - songwriting (1–5, 7–10) music (6)
  - Mortuus – vocals
  - Morgan (Morgan Steinmeyer Håkansson) – guitar
  - Devo (Magnus Andersson) – bass; engineering, production
  - Lars Broddesson – drums

=== Other personnel ===
- Belfagor (Mika Hakola) - lyrics (6)

== Charts ==
Chart (2009)	Peak position
Swedish Albums (Sverigetopplistan)	53

Chart (2020)	Peak position
German Albums (Offizielle Top 100)	96
