= Dark Endless =

Studio album by Marduk
- Released: 23 December 1992
- Recorded: June 1992
- Studio: Hellspawn Studios, Stockholm, Sweden
- Genre: Blackened death metal
- Length: 30:11
- Label: No Fashion Records
- Producer: Dan Swanö and Marduk

Marduk chronology
| Fuck Me Jesus (1991) | Dark Endless (1992) | Those of the Unlight (1993) |

Alternate cover
- 2006 re-issue digipak cover

Professional ratings
Review scores
| Source | Rating |
|---|---|
| About.com | 3.5/5 stars |
| AllMusic | 3.5/5 stars |
| Collector's Guide to Heavy Metal | 4/10 |
| Metal Storm | 8/10 |

Dark Endless is the debut studio album by Swedish black metal band Marduk. It was recorded and mixed at Hellspawn Studios during four days in June 1992 and released that December by No Fashion Records. Like many early black metal albums, it mixes black metal vocals with predominantly death metal stylings. Dark Endless is the only Marduk studio album to feature Andreas Axelsson on vocals and Rikard Kalm on bass, as by Marduk's second album Those of the Unlight, they had been replaced by Joakim Göthberg (who plays drums on this release, along with contributing some vocals) and B. War respectively.

The album was re-released with bonus tracks in digipak format on 4 April 2006 by Regain Records.

There also exists a Christian unblack metal band named "Dark Endless" who are named after this particular album.

== Track listing ==
- All songs written and arranged by Marduk.

| No. | Title | Length |
|---|---|---|
| 1. | "Still Fucking Dead (Here's No Peace)" | 3:58 |
| 2. | "The Sun Turns Black as Night" | 3:06 |
| 3. | "Within the Abyss" | 3:41 |
| 4. | "The Funeral Seemed to Be Endless" | 3:37 |
| 5. | "Departure from the Mortals" | 3:24 |
| 6. | "The Black..." | 4:03 |
| 7. | "Dark Endless" | 3:53 |
| 8. | "Holy Inquisition" | 4:25 |

Reissue bonus tracks
| No. | Title | Length |
|---|---|---|
| 10. | "Departure from the Mortals" (live) | 5:39 |
| 11. | "Within the Abyss" (live) | 5:38 |
| 12. | "Still Fucking Dead" (live) | 2:05 |
| 13. | "The Black Goat" (live) | 2:54 |
| 14. | "Evil Dead" (Death cover; live) | 5:39 |

The album intro and "Still Fucking Dead (Here's No Peace)", which were initially one track, were divided into two for the 2006 reissue of the album. The songs are listed in the reissued track listing as "The Eye of Funeral" and "Still Fucking Dead" (dropping "Here's No Peace" from the title). This is why bonus tracks on the disc start at track 10 instead of track 9.

== Personnel ==
Marduk

- Andreas Axelsson – vocals
- Morgan Steinmeyer Håkansson – guitar
- Magnus "Devo" Andersson – guitar
- Rikard Kalm – bass guitar
- Joakim Göthberg – drums, vocals

Production

- Dan Swanö – mixing
