= Here's No Peace =

EP by Marduk
- Released: October 1997
- Recorded: December 1991
- Studio: Hellspawn Studios, Stockholm, Sweden
- Genre: Black metal
- Length: 7:31
- Label: Shadow Records
- Producer: Marduk

Marduk chronology
Live in Germania (1997)	Here's No Peace (1997)	Nightwing (1998)

Here's No Peace is the second EP by Swedish black metal band Marduk. It was recorded and mixed at Hellspawn Studios in December 1991, but remained unreleased for almost six years until October 1997, when Shadow Records released it. The EP features a drastically different line-up than Marduk actually was by this time, with differences including Andreas Axelsson on vocals, Rikard Kalm on bass, and Joakim Göthberg on drums and additional vocals; Dan Swanö was also the mixer of the recording. The only member of the personnel to have remained with Marduk by the release of Here's No Peace was guitarist Morgan Steinmeyer Håkansson who remains part of the band to this day. The EP was reissued with bonus tracks in 2001 and then in 2007 by Regain Records.

== Track listing ==
No.	Title	Length
1.	"Here's No Peace"	0:44
2.	"Still Fucking Dead"	3:03
3.	"Within the Abyss"	3:42

2001 edition bonus tracks
No.	Title	Length
4.	"In Conspiracy with Satan" (Bathory cover)	2:18
5.	"Woman of Dark Desires" (Bathory cover)	4:30
Total length:		14:19

== Trivia ==
- The tank depicted on the front cover is a German World War II model, a PzIV Ausf.F2, while the back cover depicts a PzV Panther.
- The title on the cover is arranged in such fashion as to resemble an honorific cuff band, a type of distinction badge which the German Wehrmacht allowed individuals who were serving (or had served) in some elite units (Grossdeutschland division, named Waffen-SS divisions) or who took part of renowned campaigns to wear (North African campaign, assault on Crete).

== Personnel ==
Marduk

- Andreas Axelsson – vocals
- Morgan Steinmeyer Håkansson – guitar
- Rikard Kalm – bass
- Joakim Göthberg – drums, vocals

Guest

- Dan Swanö – engineer, mixing
