= Warschauer =

Warschauer is a German-language toponymic surname literally meaning "of/from Warschau" (Warsaw). It may refer to:

== People ==
- Anna Warschauer (1841–1866), wife of Ludwig Passini
- Adolf Warschauer (1855–1930), German historic, see State Archives in Gdańsk
- Claus Leon Warschauer (1929–2012), professor of University of São Paulo
- Jonatan Warschauer (1820–1888), Polish Jewish doctor
- Horst Warschauer (1919–1948), Nazi German army mayor
- Mark Warschauer (born 1954), professor at the University of California
- Marcus Warschauer (1777–1835), merchant and banker
- Robert Warschauer (1816–1884), banker from Mendelssohn family
- Robert Warschauer junior (1860–1918), German banker

== Places ==
- Warschauer Straße, major thoroughfare in Berlin, Germany
  - Berlin Warschauer Straße station, S-Bahn and U-Bahn in Berlin
  - Warschauer Straße (Berlin U-Bahn)
- Oberbilker Markt/Warschauer Straße station, station in Düsseldorf, Germany
- Warschauer Allee, Bundesautobahn 2

== See also ==
- Warszawski
- Warschau (disambiguation)
