= Night of the Long Knives (disambiguation) =

The Night of the Long Knives was a 1934 purge of political opponents in Nazi Germany.

Night of the Long Knives may also refer to:

== Historical events ==
- Treason of the Long Knives or Night of the Long Knives, a legendary massacre of British chieftains by Saxons c. 460
- Night of the Long Knives (1962), a cabinet reshuffle in Britain
- Night of the Long Knives (1981), a meeting in the process of Canadian constitutional patriation
- Night of the Long Knives (1992), a Provisional IRA attack on the Irish People's Liberation Organisation

== Music ==
- "Night of the Long Knives", a song by AC/DC from For Those About to Rock We Salute You
- "Night of the Long Knives", a song by Everything Everything from A Fever Dream
- "Night of the Long Knives", a song by Machine Head from Bloodstone & Diamonds
- "Night of the Long Knives", a song by Marduk from World Funeral
- "Night of the Long Knives", a song by Unisonic from Light of Dawn
- "Night of the Long Knives", a song by AJJ

== Other uses ==
- "Night of the Long Knives", an episode of The Time Tunnel
- The Night of the Long Knives, a 1960 novella by Fritz Leiber
- "Night of the Long Knives", a stage in the Monte Carlo Rally
