= Opus Nocturne =

Studio album by Marduk
- Released: 4 December 1994
- Recorded: September 1994
- Studios: Unisound Studios, Finspång, Sweden
- Genre: Black metal
- Length: 43:12
- Label: Osmose Productions
- Producer: Marduk

Marduk chronology
Those of the Unlight (1993)	Opus Nocturne (1994)	Heaven Shall Burn... When We Are Gathered (1996)

Professional ratings
Review scores
Source	Rating
About.com	4/5 stars
AllMusic	2/5 stars
Collector's Guide to Heavy Metal	5/10
Metal Storm	8.5/10

Opus Nocturne is the third studio album by Swedish black metal band Marduk. It was recorded and mixed at Hellspawn Studios in September 1994 and released on 4 December 1994 by Osmose Productions. In 2004 the album was remastered by the band's former member Devo Andersson and re-released on 27 June 2006 by Regain Records as a digipak that included bonus rehearsal tracks. Opus Nocturne is the last Marduk album to feature Joakim Göthberg on vocals and Dan Swanö as mixer.

Opus Nocturne was the first album to showcase Marduk's signature hyper-speed blast beat tempo; however it still contained much of the melody from Those of the Unlight while retaining this break-neck speed, instead of sheer brutality on albums like Heaven Shall Burn... When We Are Gathered and Nightwing.

"Materialized in Stone" was originally the title for the track "From the Dark Past" that appears on Mayhem's De Mysteriis Dom Sathanas. The title was changed by Per Yngve Ohlin before his death. Marduk later adopted the title for the song on this album. They had previously also used a song title by Ohlin on their album Those of the Unlight. This is considered a vague tribute to Per and his works.

In 2013, Decibel ranked Opus Nocturne at number seven on its list of the Top 100 Black Metal Albums of All Time.

== Track listing ==
All tracks are written by Marduk, except "Opus Nocturne" with lyrics by It Särkkä.

No.	Title	Length
1.	"Intro / The Appearance of Spirits of Darkness" (instrumental)	0:33
2.	"Sulphur Souls"	5:41
3.	"From Subterranean Throne Profound"	7:47
4.	"Autumnal Reaper"	3:31
5.	"Materialized in Stone"	5:10
6.	"Untrodden Paths (Wolves Part II)"	5:27
7.	"Opus Nocturne"	2:33
8.	"Deme Quaden Thyrane"	5:06
9.	"The Sun Has Failed"	7:22
Total length:		43:12

2016 edition bonus tracks
No.	Title	Length
10.	"Sulphur Souls" (rehearsal)	5:39
11.	"Materialized in Stone" (rehearsal)	5:38
12.	"Opus Nocturne" (rehearsal)	2:05
13.	"Autumnal Reaper" (rehearsal)	2:54
Total length:		59:36

== Personnel ==
Marduk

- Joakim Göthberg – vocals
- Morgan Steinmeyer Håkansson – guitar
- B. War – bass
- Fredrik Andersson – drums

Additional personnel

- Dan Swanö – engineer, mixing
