= Panzer Division Marduk =

Studio album by Marduk
- Released: June 1999
- Recorded: January 1999
- Studio: The Abyss, Pärlby, Sweden
- Genre: Black metal
- Length: 30:04
- Label: Osmose Productions
- Producer: Marduk

Marduk chronology
Nightwing (1998)	Panzer Division Marduk (1999)	Obedience (2000)

Re-release Cover
- Re-release cover

Professional ratings
Review scores
Source	Rating
Chronicles of Chaos	9/10
Collector's Guide to Heavy Metal	5/10
Rock Hard	8.0/10

Panzer Division Marduk is the sixth studio album by Swedish black metal band Marduk. It was recorded and mixed at The Abyss in January 1999 and released in June 1999 by Osmose Productions. The theme of the album is fire, as Nightwing was blood, and La Grande Danse Macabre (the band's next studio album) would be death, forming a trilogy of "Blood, Fire, and Death", Marduk's vision of what black metal is, unending grimness (as well as a tribute to the Bathory album Blood Fire Death). Panzer Division Marduk was the last Marduk release by Osmose Productions. In 2008, the album was reissued with bonus track by Regain Records

The original album cover features a photo of the Swedish version (Stridsvagn 104) of the British Centurion Mk5 tank. The 2008 reissue of the album featured a Panzer VI E "Tiger" on its cover, reinforcing the Germanic World War II theme of the album. The internal sleeve pictures a tank column triumphant across a city in ruin: this is the Red Army across a destroyed Berlin in 1945.

== Track listing ==
No.	Title	Length
1.	"Panzer Division Marduk"	2:39
2.	"Baptism by Fire"	3:51
3.	"Christraping Black Metal"	3:46
4.	"Scorched Earth"	3:37
5.	"Beast of Prey"	4:07
6.	"Blooddawn"	4:20
7.	"502"	3:14
8.	"Fistfucking God's Planet"	4:28

Re-Issue Bonus Tracks
No.	Title	Length
9.	"Deathride"
10.	"Todeskessel Kurland"
11.	"Panzer Division Marduk (Video)"

== Personnel ==
Marduk

- Legion – vocals
- Morgan Steinmeyer Håkansson – guitar
- B. War – bass
- Fredrik Andersson – drums

Guest

- Peter Tägtgren – mixing
