= Warschau (album) =

Live album by Marduk
- Released: January 23, 2006 (Standard); July 17, 2006 (Limited edition)
- Recorded: 2005
- Genre: Black metal
- Length: 68:31
- Label: Regain Records
- Producer: Marduk

Marduk chronology
Plague Angel (2004)	Warschau (2006)	ROM 5:12 (2007)

Warschau is the third live album by Swedish black metal band Marduk. It was recorded in Warsaw, Poland in 2005 and released on January 23, 2006 by Regain Records, to commemorate "15 years of Marduk." A limited edition packaging with a bonus DVD of live performances was released later that year, on July 17. Warschau was the last live Marduk album to feature Emil Dragutinovic on drums.

AllMusic rated the album four stars and described it as "a disc that hardcore Marduk enthusiasts will be glad to have in their collections."

== Track listing ==
No.	Title	Length
1.	"The Hangman of Prague"	3:54
2.	"Seven Angels, Seven Trumpets"	2:41
3.	"Slay the Nazarene"	3:37
4.	"Azrael"	3:03
5.	"Burn My Coffin"	5:23
6.	"Panzer Division Marduk"	2:25
7.	"Blutrache"	5:25
8.	"Bleached Bones"	4:53
9.	"The Black..."	3:22
10.	"Steel Inferno"	2:28
11.	"On Darkened Wings"	4:22
12.	"With Satan and Victorious Weapons"	3:41
13.	"Throne of Rats"	3:14
14.	"To the Death's Head True"	3:24
15.	"Sulphur Souls"	5:53
16.	"Warschau"	4:54
17.	"Wolves"	5:42

Limited edition DVD
No.	Title	Length
1.	"The Hangman of Prague"
2.	"Perish in Flames"
3.	"Burn My Coffin"
4.	"With Satan and Victorious Weapons"
5.	"Warschau"
6.	"Wolves"

== Trivia ==
- Warschau is titled after a song of the same name which appeared on Marduk's 2004 album Plague Angel. It means Warsaw in German.
- Two song titles on the back cover of the CD are spelled incorrectly: "The Hangman of Prague" is spelled "The Hangman of Prauge", and "Slay the Nazarene" is spelled as "Slay the Nazarine".

== Personnel ==
Marduk

- Mortuus – vocals
- Morgan Steinmeyer Håkansson – guitar
- Magnus "Devo" Andersson – bass
- Emil Dragutinovic – drums
