= Blackcrowned =

Compilation album by Marduk
- Released: February 19, 2002
- Recorded: September 1992 – September 2001
- Genre: Black metal
- Length: 94:56
- Label: Regain Records
- Producer: Marduk

Marduk chronology
La Grande Danse Macabre (2001)	Blackcrowned (2002)	World Funeral (2003)

Blackcrowned is a box set by Swedish black metal band Marduk. It is composed of previously unreleased material recorded and mixed at Bloodspawn Studios and The Abyss between September 1992 and September 2001, and was released on February 19, 2002 by Regain Records.

== Track listing ==
Disc 1
No.	Title	Length
1.	"The Sun Turns Black as Night"	2:57
2.	"The Funeral Seemed to Be Endless"	3:49
3.	"Darkness Breeds Immortality"	3:30
4.	"A Sculpture of the Night"	3:03
5.	"Untrodden Paths (Wolves Part II)"	5:22
6.	"The Sun Has Failed"	5:18
7.	"Deathride"	3:16
8.	"Earth A.D." (The Misfits cover)	1:51
9.	"Beyond the Grace of God"	5:21
10.	"Glorification"	4:07
11.	"Black Tormentor/Shadow of Our Infernal King"	4:20
12.	"Infernal Eternal/Towards the Land of the Damned"	4:36

Disc 2
No.	Title	Length
1.	"Bloodletting"	6:02
2.	"Todeskessel Kurland"	2:32
3.	"Paint It Black" (The Rolling Stones cover)	3:14
4.	"Macabre" (Samhain cover)	2:20
5.	"Baptism by Fire"	4:11
6.	"Funeral Bitch"	4:00
7.	"Dracole Wayda"	4:12
8.	"Sulphur Souls"	5:39
9.	"Materialized in Stone"	5:38
10.	"Opus Nocturne"	2:05
11.	"Autumnal Reaper"	2:54
12.	"Samhain"	1:30
13.	"Hell Child"	2:57

== Personnel ==
- Andreas Axelsson – vocals
- Legion – vocals
- Morgan Steinmeyer Håkansson – guitar
- Magnus "Devo" Andersson – guitar
- B. War – bass
- Joakim Göthberg – drums, vocals
- Fredrik Andersson – drums
- Dan Swanö – mixing
- Peter Tägtgren – mixing
