= Puissance (disambiguation) =

Puissance is the high-jump competition in the equestrian sport of show jumping.

Puissance may also refer to:

- Puissance (band), is a Swedish martial neoclassical music group formed in 1993
- Puissance (stallion), an Irish Sport Horse active in the equestrian sport of dressage
