= Iron Dawn =

Iron Dawn may refer to:

- Iron Dawn (novel), a 1998 fantasy novel by Matthew Stover
- Iron Dawn (EP), a 2011 EP by Marduk
