= In Honour of Icon E - A Tribute to Emperor =

In Honour of Icon E

Compilation album by Various artists
- Released: June 25, 2012
- Genre: Black metal
- Label: Tryzna Production/Candlelight Records

In Honour of Icon E is a tribute album to Norwegian black metal band Emperor, released on June 25, 2012.

== Reception ==
The album received positive reviews from heavy metal outlets and received praises from the members of Emperor. Metal.de stated that, among "a whole flood of unnecessary and useless publications", In Honour of Icon E is "really essential", further stating that the mix of "lesser known Eastern Bloc bands and [...] bigger Scandinavian names seems a bit strange at first, but makes the sampler colorful". Chris Popp, writing for musikreviews.de, concluded that the album is "one of the better homage compilations", although mainly of interest to "die-hard Emperor fans".

In a review for Metal Kaoz, Minos Dokopoulos called In Honour of Icon E "an excellent tribute album", while heavymetal.dk considered this tribute to be "one of the better ones", commenting that "the respective cover artists very often capture the atmosphere and compositional musical sublimity that Emperor's music was/is an expression of".

== Track listing ==
Side A
No.	Title	Artist	Length
1.	"Introduction"	Svartalv	1:09
2.	"Curse You All Men!"	Saltus	4:39
3.	"Towards the Pantheon"	Troll	5:54
4.	"Ye Entrancemperium"	Infer	5:11
5.	"Night of the Graveless Souls"	Demonical	3:36
6.	"Heksesabbat (Witches Sabbath)"	Helheim	7:50
7.	"Cosmic Keys to My Creations and Times"	Midnight Odyssey	6:20
8.	"Moon Over Kara-Shehr"	Silva Nigra	4:50
9.	"Lord of the Storms"	Necrodeath	2:14
10.	"Herramme Viha (Wrath of the Tyrant)"	Horna	4:03
11.	"Ancient Queen"	Karpathia	3:19
12.	"S Siloju Ja Horju (With Strength I Burn)"	Ancestral Volkhves	8:11
13.	"Empty"	Mesmerized	4:16
14.	"The Loss and Curse of Reverence"	Crionics	5:57
15.	"I Am the Black Wizards"	Taake	6:13
16.	"Inno A Satana"	Setherial	4:46
