= Plague Angel =

Studio album by Marduk
- Released: 22 November 2004
- Recorded: August − September 2004
- Studio: Endarker Studio
- Genre: Black metal
- Length: 44:56
- Label: Regain Records
- Producer: Marduk

Marduk chronology
World Funeral (2003)	Plague Angel (2004)	Rom 5:12 (2007)

Marduk Discography singles chronology
"Funeral Marches And Warsongs" (2004)	"'Plague Angel'" (2004)	"Deathmarch" (2004)

Professional ratings
Review scores
Source	Rating
AllMusic	4/5 stars
Blabbermouth	7/10 stars

Plague Angel is the ninth studio album by Swedish black metal band Marduk. It was recorded and mixed at Endarker Studio in September 2004 and released that November by Regain Records. Plague Angel is the first Marduk album to feature Mortuus on vocals and Magnus "Devo" Andersson, ex-guitarist for Marduk following his departure in 1994, on bass and mixing. This album marked a definitive shift in Marduk's lyrical approach. Instead of overt Satanism, much of the lyrics take a more religious-like direction. This is due to Morgan and Mortuus' fascination with the Bible, as they both admit to being Bible experts (despite Marduk's anti-religious stance, Morgan has admitted that he uses the Bible as inspiration solely for its violent content, as he finds death and violence to be most inspirational for Marduk, and that he can "write a complete song mentally by just looking at a violent painting or image"). "The Hangman of Prague" refers to Reinhard Heydrich after the invasion of Czechoslovakia.

== Track listing ==
No.	Title	Length
1.	"The Hangman of Prague"	3:05
2.	"Throne of Rats"	2:42
3.	"Seven Angels, Seven Trumpets"	2:47
4.	"Life's Emblem"	4:55
5.	"Steel Inferno"	2:23
6.	"Perish in Flames"	7:46
7.	"Holy Blood, Holy Grail"	2:27
8.	"Warschau"	3:18
9.	"Deathmarch"	4:10
10.	"Everything Bleeds"	3:33
11.	"Blutrache"	7:50

Deathmarch
No.	Title	Length
1.	"Steel Inferno" (Alternative Version)	2:13
2.	"Tod and Vernichtung"	3:29
3.	"The Hangman of Prague" (Rehearsal)	2:52
4.	"Throne of Rats" (Rehearsal)	2:55

Live Performance On Party San Festival 2006
No.	Title	Length
1.	"Still Fucking Dead"
2.	"Baptism By Fire"
3.	"With Satan And Victorious Weapons"
4.	"Funeral Bitch"
5.	"Hangman Of Prague"
6.	"Sulphur Souls"
7.	"Of Hells Fire"
8.	"Throne Of Rats"
9.	"Wolves"

== Credits ==
=== Marduk ===
- Marduk - songwriting
  - Mortuus – vocals
  - Evil (Patrik Niclas Morgan Håkansson) – guitar
  - Devo (Dan Everth Magnus Andersson) – bass; mixing
  - Emil Dragutinovic – drums

=== Personnel on Deathmarch ===
- Arditi - co-songwriting, performers

=== Layout ===
- Ketoladog
