= Triumphator (band) =

Swedish black metal band

- Origin: Linköping, Sweden
- Genres: Black metal
- Years active: 1995–2001
- Labels: Mark of the Devil, Shadow Records, Necropolis Records, Merciless Records, Listenable Records
- Members: Tena / Deathfucker (Marcus Tena); Arioch; Draugen
- Past members: Froding (Fredrik Andersson); Mörk; Ornias; Skeleton

Triumphator were a Swedish black metal band consisting of Tena on bass, Arioch on guitar and vocals and Fredrik Andersson on drums, who released a demo, an EP and one album between 1996 and 1999.

== History ==
Triumphator was formed in 1995. They released a demo; The Triumph of Satan in 1996. The EP The Ultimate Sacrifice was recorded at Tore "Necromorbus" Stjerna's Necromorbus Studios in 1998 and was released the following year by Tena's own label. Their album Wings of Antichrist, which featured guest lyrics by Mörk of Malign, Morgan S. Håkansson of Marduk, Nattfursth of Sorhin and Belfagor of Ofermod, was recorded at Peter Tägtgren's Abyss Studio 1999 and mastered at the Sound Temple Studios in Oakland. MkM of Antaeus recorded the song "Burn the Heart of the Earth" at a concert in Waregem, Belgium, in 2000, with a live line-up featuring guitarists Mörk and Ornias as well as drummer Draugen, who also recorded "From Under to Below" (with lyrics written by MkM) with the band in 2001 at the Studio Akai Birkenau. According to Daniel Ekeroth, Tena "was arrested for possession of drugs and weapons", which led to the end of the band and Tena's store and label Shadow Records.

After his release from prison Marcus Tena reopened Shadow Records and in 2019, released a compilation called Black Metal Terror which featured remastered rereleases of the band's first EP alongside the early EP's of Ofermod, Malign and Watain.

== Musical style and ideology ==
Ekeroth described Triumphator as "[f]ast and aggressive black metal with a deadly touch", sounding "a lot like Marduk […]. Straightforward, with no bullshit." Watain vocalist Erik Danielsson mentioned them as an honourable band within the Swedish scene, "whose messages rests [sic!] solely on religion".

== Discography ==
- The Triumph of Satan (demo, 1996)
- The Ultimate Sacrifice (EP, 1999)
- Wings of Antichrist (album, 1999)
- Black Metal Terror (split compilation, 2019)
