= Serpent Sermon =

Studio album by Marduk
- Released: 28 May 2012
- Genre: Black metal
- Length: 54:25
- Label: Century Media
- Producer: Magnus "Devo" Andersson, Marduk

Marduk chronology
Iron Dawn (2011)	Serpent Sermon (2012)	Frontschwein (2015)

Serpent Sermon is the twelfth studio album by Swedish black metal band Marduk. It was released in North America on 5 June 2012 through Century Media Records on CD, vinyl and digital download. It reached number 44 on the Top Heatseekers Albums chart, selling roughly 800 copies in its first week. Limited edition versions of the album include the bonus track "Coram Satanae", and a limited edition 7" vinyl EP of "Souls for Belial" was also released, featuring a cover of Wovenhand's "Oil On Panel". A music video of "Souls for Belial" was also released on 9 May 2012. The last album to feature drummer Lars Broddesson.

== Track listing ==
- All songs written and arranged by Marduk.

No.	Title	Length
1.	"Serpent Sermon"	4:38
2.	"Messianic Pestilence"	2:50
3.	"Souls for Belial"	4:47
4.	"Into Second Death"	5:11
5.	"Temple of Decay"	5:25
6.	"Damnation's Gold"	6:48
7.	"Hail Mary (Piss-soaked Genuflexion)"	3:27
8.	"M.A.M.M.O.N."	3:30
9.	"Gospel of the Worm"	2:37
10.	"World of Blades"	7:09
11.	"Coram Satanae" (limited edition bonus track)	8:03
Total length:		54:25

== Personnel ==
Marduk

- Mortuus – vocals
- Morgan Steinmeyer Håkansson – guitar
- Magnus "Devo" Andersson – bass
- Lars Broddesson – drums

== Charts ==
Chart (2012)	Peak position
Belgian Albums (Ultratop Wallonia)	122
German Albums (Offizielle Top 100)	92
Swedish Albums (Sverigetopplistan)	43
US Heatseekers Albums (Billboard)	44
