= Within (Embraced album) =

Studio album by Embraced
- Released: November 14, 2000
- Recorded: December 1999 at The Abyss
- Genre: Black metal
- Length: 53:38
- Label: Regain
- Producer: Tommy Tägtgren

Embraced chronology
Amorous Anathema (1998)	Within (2000)

Within is the second studio album by the Swedish melodic black metal band Embraced, released in 2000 through Regain Records.

== Track listing ==
No.	Title	Length
1.	"Solitude of My Own"	06:57
2.	"Within Me"	05:05
3.	"The Fallen"	07:44
4.	"Putrefaction"	04:08
5.	"Era of Changes"	07:17
6.	"Nighttime Drama"	05:30
7.	"Sacred Tears"	07:28
8.	"Blessed Are Those..."	06:04
9.	"Outro"	03:25
10.	"Big in Japan" (Alphaville cover) (bonus track)	03:27
11.	"Book of Keys" (bonus track)	06:54
Total length:		63:56

== Personnel ==
- Kalle Johansson - vocals
- Thomas Lejon - drums
- Julius Chmielewski - keyboards
- Sven Karlsson - keyboards, mastering
- Michael Håkansson - bass
- Davor Tepic - guitars
- Peter Mårdklint - guitars, mastering

== Additional personnel ==
- Odious Engender - logo art
- K. Metz - cover art, layout
- Staffan Olsson - mastering
- Tommy Tägtgren - engineering, mixing
- Jenny Baumgartner - photography
