= Those of the Unlight =

Studio album by Marduk
- Released: 1 October 1993
- Recorded: April 1993
- Studios: Hellspawn Studios, Stockholm, Sweden
- Genre: Black metal
- Length: 37:31
- Label: Osmose Productions
- Producer: Marduk

Marduk chronology
Dark Endless (1992)	Those of the Unlight (1993)	Opus Nocturne (1994)

Professional ratings
Review scores
Source	Rating
About.com	4/5 stars
AllMusic	3.5/5 stars
Collector's Guide to Heavy Metal	6/10
Metal Storm	7.9/10
Rock Hard	7.5/10

Those of the Unlight is the second studio album by Swedish black metal band Marduk. It was released in October 1993 by Osmose Productions, and reissued in digipak format on April 4, 2006 by Regain Records, with bonus videos of three songs performed live on August 12, 1993. It is the first album the band produced in a proper black metal style, as opposed to the blackened death metal approach of their 1992 debut, Dark Endless.

Those of the Unlight is the last Marduk release to feature Joakim Göthberg on drums, as he would purely assume vocal duties by the next studio album, Opus Nocturne. It also the last studio release to have two guitarists, as Devo Andersson was not in Marduk after this release, although he did return in 2004 as the bassist.

"Burn My Coffin" was originally the title for a track that would appear on Mayhem's De Mysteriis Dom Sathanas, the title was changed by Per Yngve Ohlin before he died. Marduk later adopted the title for the song on this album.

In 2013, Decibel ranked Those of the Unlight at number 88 on its list of the Top 100 Black Metal Albums of All Time.

== Track listing ==
All lyrics are written by Morgan Håkansson; all music is composed by Marduk.

No.	Title	Length
1.	"Darkness Breeds Immortality"	3:49
2.	"Those of the Unlight"	4:43
3.	"Wolves"	5:50
4.	"On Darkened Wings"	4:16
5.	"Burn My Coffin"	5:15
6.	"A Sculpture of the Night"	3:29
7.	"Echoes from the Past" (instrumental)	7:06
8.	"Stone Stands Its Silent Vigil"	3:03

Live reissue video bonus tracks
No.	Title	Length
9.	"Darkness Breeds Immortality"
10.	"A Sculpture of the Night"
11.	"The Funeral Seemed to be Endless"

== Personnel ==
Marduk

- Joakim Af Gravf (Joakim Göthberg) – vocals, drums
- Morgan Håkansson (Patrik Niclas Morgan Håkansson) – guitar
- Devo Andersson (Dan Everth Magnus Andersson) – guitar
- B. War (Roger Svensson) – bass

Production

- Dan Swanö – mixing
