= Death Wolf =

Swedish horror punk/heavy metal band

Death Wolf are a Swedish horror punk and heavy metal band. They were originally formed as Devils Whorehouse and started as a Misfits/Samhain cover band.

== Biography ==
Devils Whorehouse were formed in 2000 as a Misfits/Samhain cover band but soon started to write own material.

In March 2011 they decided to change their original name and are now continuing under the name Death Wolf because "the music and philosophy behind the orchestra has outgrown its name". The name change was followed by a self-titled album released through now defunct label Regain Records

== Musical style and lyrics ==
The early Devils Whorehouse material is stylistically close to the bands Misfits and Samhain whom they originally covered. The name they adopted in 2011, Death Wolf, symbolises "the strength, dedication and will shown in its creations". The first album under the new name deals with "Northern end themes and death hymns". Their music still pays homage to Misfits and Samhain founder Glenn Danzig, though in a more subtle way than on early recordings, with "high speed metal punk" tracks like "Sudden Bloodletter" as well as doom tracks like "Rothenburg".

== Band members ==
=== Current ===
- Martin Gustafsson - vocals
- Morgan Håkansson - bass
- Hrafn - drums
- Makko - guitar

=== Former ===
- Roger Svensson: bass
- Zwedda: vocals

=== Live musicians ===
- Lars Broddesson: drums
- Jeff Tandy: bass
- Calle Larsson: drums

== Discography ==
- 2000 - The Howling (EP) (as Devils Whorehouse - Blooddawn Productions)
- 2003 - Revelation Unorthodox (as Devils Whorehouse - Blooddawn Productions)
- 2008 - Werewolf (EP) (as Devils Whorehouse - Blooddawn Productions and Regain Records)
- 2009 - Blood & Ashes (as Devils Whorehouse - Blooddawn Productions and Regain Records)
- 2011 - Death Wolf (Blooddawn Productions and Regain Records)
- 2012 - Snake Mountain (Single) (Century Media Records)
- 2013 - II: Black Armoured Death (Century Media Records)
- 2014 - Liksjöns Drickare (Single) (Century Media Records)
- 2014 - III: Östergötland (Century Media Records)
- 2019 - IV: Come The Dark (Regain Records)
