= Arditi (band) =

Swedish band

Background information
- Origin: Linköping, Östergötland, Sweden
- Genres: Martial industrial; Dark ambient; Neofolk; neoclassical dark wave
- Years active: 1997–present
- Members: Henry Möller, Mårten Björkman

Arditi is a Swedish martial industrial and neoclassical dark wave band. It consists of Henry Möller (Puissance and Leidungr) and Mårten Björkman from black metal bands Algaion and Octinomos.

== History ==
Arditi formed in 1997, deriving their name from the early 20th century Italian special forces unit known as the Arditi. They released their first EP, Unity of Blood in 2002, following it soon after was their first full-length album, Marching on to Victory in 2003. Since then Arditi has released nine more full-length albums, Spirit of Sacrifice in 2005, Standards of Triumph in 2006, Omne Ensis Impera in 2008, Leading the Iron Resistance in 2011 as well as three more EPs, including a limited edition split album with Toroidh.

== Content of the letters ==
Möller and Björkman themselves situate their project in the tradition of Italian Futurism and its founder Filippo Tommaso Marinetti; Allerseelen and Der Blutharsch are mentioned as early musical influences. The leitmotifs of Arditi's music derive from this line of tradition, according to the Futurist Manifesto: exaltation of danger and daring, propagation of "heroic realism" and tonal creation of a warlike atmosphere - consequently, exaltation of war as an extreme form of Art.

On the cover of the album Omne Ensis Impera (in English: 'Master all with the sword') is the following postulate:

"We sing the Praise of War. Not for the Way it makes People die, but for the Way it makes People come alive.".

— Arditi.

To implement this artistic claim, Arditi's songs use a wealth of historical samples, such as those from newsreels (Nicht mehr Schande; Der Angriff geht weiter; Sieg durch Zwecksetzung; Militant Fate) or transcriptions of speeches by fascist leaders such as Corneliu Zelea Codreanu (Legionaries) and Benito Mussolini (Sun of Predappio). In some cases, recordings of speeches or excerpts from written works translated into English are used, including those of Carl von Clausewitz (Military Virtue), Ioannis Metaxas (False Mask of Freedom), BUF politician Arthur K. Chesterton (Profound Truths), Alfred Rosenberg (Religion of the Blood - from "The Myth of the 20th Century") and Adolf Hitler (Sons of God; Bless our Arms - both titles contain passages from Mein Kampf). Some songs also use samples from television documentaries, such as about the Leibstandarte SS Adolf Hitler (That Day of Infamy) or the Swedish volunteer units in the Finnish Winter War against the Soviet Union (Volunteers). Relatively rarely, own texts, mostly of culturally pessimistic content, are presented in spoken word style (The Measures of Our Age, Ploughshares into Swords, The Sinking Ship, The Absolute Essence). The song Marching on to Victory is an alienated recording of the Prussian march Gloria.

This fixation of content on war and totalitarian systems, together with a constant "monumental and cold image " of its releases, create an atmosphere peculiar to Arditi, which is perceived as immensely threatening and ominous, in which the ambivalent music leaves it up to the listener's choice whether to understand it as a glorification of war or as an admonitory implementation of the great conflicts of the 20th century: "You can tell: there is a powerful fascination with the dark side of history, especially war".

== Collaborations ==
There are close contacts with Swedish industrial musician Henrik "Nordvargr" Björkk, well known within the scene. Nordvargr not only played an important role on the 2008 album Omne Ensis Impera, but also contributed to the 2004 split album United in Blood with his project Toroidh.

Another musical collaboration was with the well-known Swedish black metal band Marduk: The melody of the song Deathmarch from the Marduk album Plague Angel comes from Arditi, who re-released the title as an instrumental version without the vocal track of Marduk singer Mortuus on his Standards of Triumph album. The 1651 title music from the Marduk album Rom 5:12 also comes from Arditi, as does Warschau III: Necropolis from the 2015 limited edition Frontschwein album.

They have also collaborated with the French black metal band Baise Ma Hache on the track Aux modernes from the album F.E.R.T.

== Discography ==
=== Albums ===
Year	Title	Format
2003	Marching on to Victory	CD
2004	United in Blood	CD
2004	Spirit of Sacrifice	CD
2006	Standards of Triumph	CD
2008	Omne Ensis Impera	CD
2011	Leading the Iron Resistance	CD
2014	Pylons of the Adversary	CD
2014	Imposing Elitism	CD
2020	Insignia of the Sun	CD
2023	Emblem of Victory	CD

=== EPs and singles ===
Year	Title
2002	Unity of Blood
2003	Jedem das Seine
2005	Arditi
2006	Destiny of Iron
2009	Statues of Gods
2011	One Will
2014	Templets Heliga Härd
2015	March for the Gods
2019	Sanctum Regnum
2020	Religion of the Blood
2020	Words Made of Stone
2021	Gloria victis

=== Collaborations ===
Year	Title
2004	United In Blood
2009	Statues of Gods
2014	Templets Heliga Härd
2014	Pylons of the Adversary
2021	Gloria Victis

== See also ==
- Puissance - related group
