= World Funeral =

Studio album by Marduk
- Released: 25 March 2003
- Recorded: September – November 2002
- Studio: The Abyss, Pärlby, Sweden
- Genre: Black metal
- Length: 48:14
- Label: Regain Records
- Producer: Marduk

Marduk chronology
Blackcrowned (2002)	World Funeral (2003)	Plague Angel (2004)

Alternative Cover
- Reissue cover

Professional ratings
Review scores
Source	Rating
AllMusic	3/5 stars

World Funeral is the eighth studio album by Swedish black metal band Marduk. It was recorded and mixed at The Abyss between September and November 2002 and released on 25 March 2003 by Regain Records.

Many fans suggested the band was going for a more commercial "mainstream" approach while others complimented its attempt to broaden its sound. World Funeral is the first Marduk album to feature Emil Draguntinovic on drums, the last to feature Legion on vocals and B. War on bass, and the last to feature mixing by Peter Tägtgren.

A music video was released for the title song.

== Track listing ==
No.	Title	Length
1.	"With Satan and Victorious Weapons"	3:51
2.	"Bleached Bones"	5:20
3.	"Cloven Hoof"	3:26
4.	"World Funeral"	3:31
5.	"To the Death's Head True"	3:58
6.	"Castrum Doloris"	3:34
7.	"Hearse"	4:54
8.	"Night of the Long Knives"	5:31
9.	"Bloodletting"	5:49
10.	"Blessed Unholy"	5:02
11.	"Blackcrowned" (instrumental)	2:18

Bonus tracks
No.	Title	Length
12.	"Phantasm" (Possessed cover; Japan bonus track)
13.	"The Black..." (Live; Japan bonus track)

== Composition ==
- "Blackcrowned" is an adaptation of Music for the Funeral of Queen Mary by English Baroque composer Henry Purcell.
- The song "Hearse" is based upon the horror film Phantasm by Don Coscarelli.
- The band used Fredman's Epistle No. 81, Märk hur vår skugga by the Swedish 18th century poet and composer Carl Michael Bellman for the mid-paced track "Castrum Doloris".
- The intro for the song "With Satan and Victorious Weapons" is a sample from the movie The Name of the Rose.

== Personnel ==
Marduk

- Legion – vocals
- Morgan Steinmeyer Håkansson – lead guitars
- B. War – bass
- Emil Dragutinovic – drums

Guest

- Peter Tägtgren – mixing
