= Satariel (band) =

Swedish death metal band

- Origin: Sweden
- Genres: Black metal Melodic death metal Blackened death metal
- Years active: 1993–present
- Label: None
- Members: Pär Johansson; Mikael Granbacke; Magnus Alakangas; Robert Sundelin; Mikael Granqvist
- Past members: Andreas Nilzon; Fredrik Andersson; Mats Ömalm; Simon Johansson
- Website: www.satariel.com

Satariel is a Swedish death metal band founded in 1993 in Boden.

== History ==
Satariel recorded the demo Thy Heavens' Fall in 1994, consisting of traditional black metal. The band released their debut album, Lady Lust Lilith, in 1998 on Pulverised Records. Over its first four albums up to 2007, the band mixed melodic death metal with black metal and technical death metal, sometimes drawing comparisons to Opeth and Insomnium. After a seven-year hiatus, Satariel released the three-song EP White Ink: Chapter 1 in 2014.

== Members ==
=== Current members ===
- Pär Johansson – vocals
- Magnus Alakangas – guitar
- Mikael Granqvist – guitar
- Mikael Granbacke – bass guitar
- Robert Sundelin – drums

=== Past members ===
- Mats Ömalm – guitar
- Andreas Nilzon – drums
- Fredrik Andersson – guitar
- Simon Johansson – guitar

== Discography ==
- Lady Lust Lilith (Pulverised Records, 1998; re-released by Hammerheart Records, 2003)
- Phobos & Deimos (Hammerheart Records, 2002)
- Hydra (Cold Records/Regain Records/Candlelight Records, 2005)
- Chifra (Pulverised Records, 2007)
- White Ink: Chapter 1 (Alakangas Media, 2014)
