= Setherial =

Swedish musical band

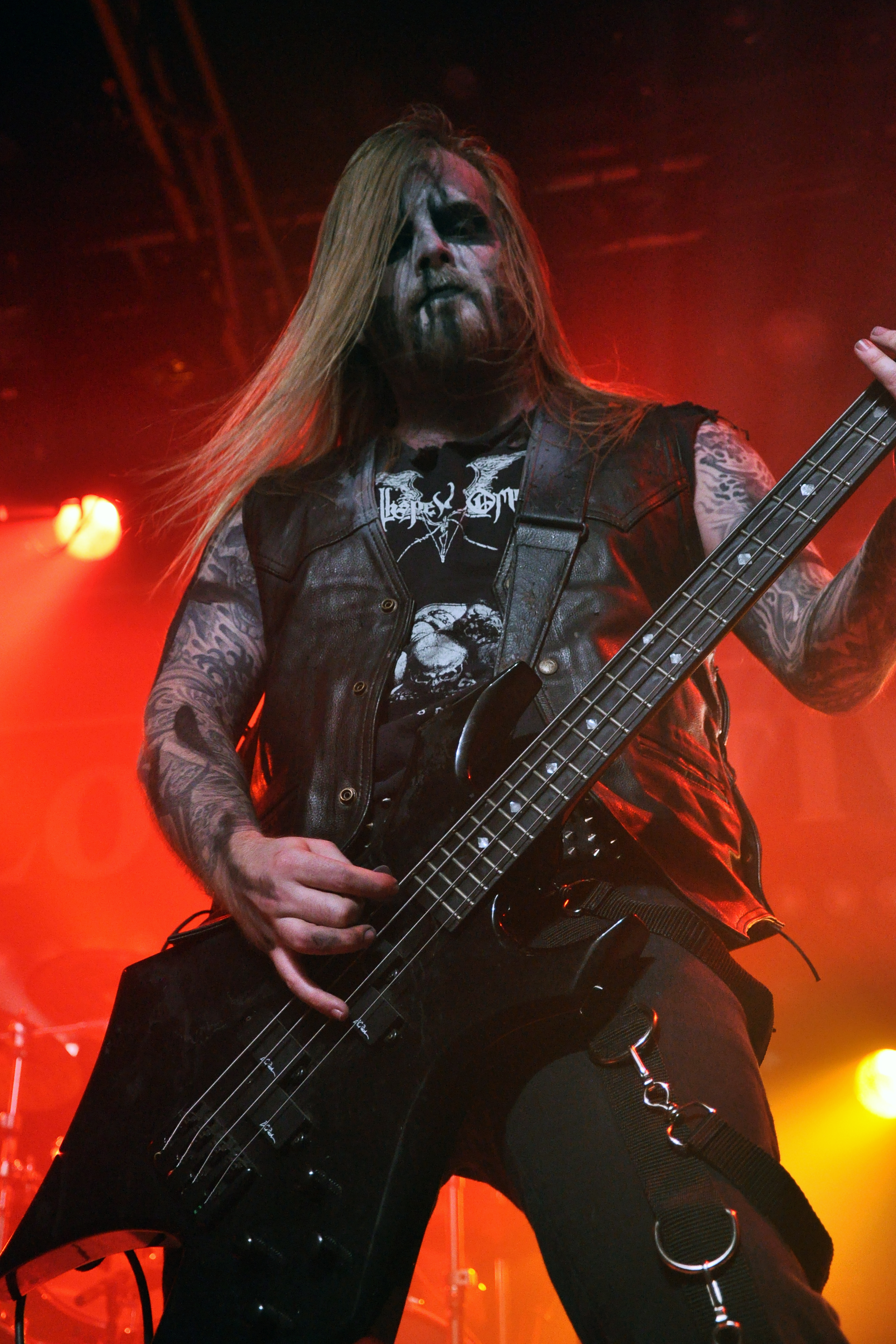

Background information
- Origin: Sundsvall, Sweden
- Genres: Black metal
- Years active: 1993-present
- Labels: Regain Records
- Members: Infaustus; Kraath; Mysteriis; Funestus
- Past members: Kheeroth; Wrath; Thorn; Sasrof; Zathanel; Funestus Infernis; Moloch; Choronzon; Devothan; Thurz

Setherial is a Swedish black metal band founded in 1993 by guitarists Alastor Mysteriis and Devothan. They play a faster style of black metal like certain popular bands Marduk and Dark Funeral. They have released 6 albums, with Ekpyrosis having been released in 2010.

== Discography ==
=== Demos and EPs ===
- A Hail to the Faceless Angels [Demo] - (1994)
- För Dem Mitt Blod [EP] - (1995)

=== Studio releases ===
- Nord... - (1996)
- Lords of the Nightrealm - (1998)
- Hell Eternal - (1999)
- From The Ancient Ruins (Re-release of old material and previously unreleased tracks) - (2003)
- Endtime Divine - (2003)
- Death Triumphant - (2006)
- Ekpyrosis - (2010)

== Band members ==
=== Current ===
- Infaustus - vocals (2003-present)
- Kraath - guitars, bass guitar (1994-present), vocals (1994-1996, 1998)
- Alastor Mysteriis - bass guitar, drums (1998-present), guitar (1993-1998)
- Empyrion - drums, (2010-present)

=== Former ===
Vocals

- Kheeroth - (1993–1995) (Midvinter)
- Wrath - (1999–2003) (Naglfar)

Bass guitar

- Thorn - (1994–1996) (Blot Mine, Egregori)
- Sasrof - (1998–2001) (Bloodline, Diabolicum, Hyena)
- Zathanel (Anders Löfgren) - ((previously drums 1993-1995); bass 2001–2005) (Blot Mine, Blackwinds, Sorhin, Midvinter)
- Funestus Inferis (Daniel Lindgren) - (2005-2009) (Apostasy, Divine Souls)

Drums

- Moloch (Otto Wiklund) - (1996–1998) (R.I.P. October 18, 1976 - August 13, 2006, heart failure) (In Battle, Odhinn)

Guitars

- Thurz - (2007-2010) (Conquest, In Aeturnum)
- Choronzon (G. Johansson) - (1996-2006) (Torchbearer, Chaosdaemon, Slightly Satanic, Soulcinders)
- Devothan - (1993–1995)
- Guh.Lu - (2010)
