= Toroidh =

- Origin: Sweden
- Genres: Martial industrial, Neofolk, Experimental
- Years active: 2001–2015 (intermittent)
- Labels: Eternal Soul Records, Cold Spring, Neuropa Records, 205 Recordings
- Members: Henrik Nordvargr Björkk

Toroidh was a martial music project by Swedish musician Henrik Nordvargr Björkk (of industrial band Maschinenzimmer 412 fame). Bjorkk has described it as a continuation of Folkstorm, his previous project. In 2015 the project continued.

== Releases ==
- For The Fallen Ones (Eternal Soul Records, 7")
- Europe Is Dead (Cold Spring, 2001, CD)
- Those Who Do Not Remember The Past Are Condemned To Repeat It (205 Recordings, 2001, CD & LP)
- Enter Nordvargr, one track on compilation (Old Europa Cafe, 2002, 2xCD)
- Start Over (Neuropa Records, 2003, 2x7")
- Testament (205 Recordings, 2003, CD)
- Chamber, one track on compilation (Cold Spring, 2003, CD)
- United in Blood (together with Arditi) (Neuropa Records, 2004, CD)
- A Final Testimony, one track on compilation (Seküencias De Culto, 2004, 2xCD)
- Offensiv! (Eternal Soul Records, 2004, CD)
- European Trilogy (War Office Propaganda, 2006, 3-CD boxset)
- The Final Testament (Eternal Pride Productions, 2006, CD)
- Segervittring (Neuropa Records, 2007, CD)
