= Viktoria (Marduk album) =

Marduk album

Studio album by Marduk
- Released: 22 June 2018
- Genre: Black metal
- Length: 32:54
- Label: Century Media
- Producer: Marduk

Marduk chronology
Frontschwein (2015)	Viktoria (2018)	Memento Mori (2023)

Singles from Viktoria
- 1. "Werwolf" Released: 27 April 2018; 2. "Equestrian Bloodlust" Released: 11 May 2018

Professional ratings
Review scores
Source	Rating
Metal Hammer	3.5/5
Metal Storm	7.5/10
Sputnikmusic	2.5/5

Viktoria is the fourteenth studio album by Swedish black metal band Marduk. It was released on 22 June 2018. The album's lyrics follow in a similar vein to some of their previous albums, focusing on historical World War II lyrical themes. It is the band's last album to feature bassist Magnus "Devo" Andersson and drummer Fredrik Widigs.

== Track listing ==
No.	Title	Length
1.	"Werwolf"	2:02
2.	"June 44"	3:49
3.	"Equestrian Bloodlust"	2:51
4.	"Tiger I"	4:12
5.	"Narva"	4:31
6.	"The Last Fallen"	4:25
7.	"Viktoria"	3:26
8.	"The Devil's Song"	3:46
9.	"Silent Night"	4:12
Total length:		32:54

== Credits ==
Credits adapted from Metal Force.

- Daniel "Mortuus" Rostén – vocals
- Morgan Steinmeyer Håkansson – guitars
- Magnus "Devo" Andersson – bass
- Fredrik Widigs – drums

== Charts ==
Chart (2018)	Peak position
Austrian Albums (Ö3 Austria)	26
Belgian Albums (Ultratop Flanders)	50
Belgian Albums (Ultratop Wallonia)	90
Dutch Albums (Album Top 100)	154
Finnish Albums (Suomen virallinen lista)	17
French Albums (SNEP)	141
German Albums (Offizielle Top 100)	10
Swedish Albums (Sverigetopplistan)	29
Swiss Albums (Schweizer Hitparade)	30
US Heatseekers Albums (Billboard)	15
