= Fuck Me Jesus =

Album by Marduk

Demo album by Marduk
- Released: June 1991
- Recorded: 1991
- Studio: Gorysound Studios
- Genre: Black metal, death metal
- Length: 12:40
- Label: Osmose Productions
- Producer: Marduk

Marduk chronology
Fuck Me Jesus (1991)	Dark Endless (1992)

Fuck Me Jesus is the first demo by Swedish metal band Marduk. It was recorded and mixed at Gorysound Studios, and released in June 1991.

The musical style for this album is straightforward death metal influenced by black metal, but not as fast and intense as the band's later signature sound.

It was re-released by Osmose Productions on 21 April 1995 on CD and 7-inch vinyl limited to 700 hand-numbered copies, again on CD in 1999 with three bonus tracks, and again in 2006 on a 10-inch mLP limited to 500 copies.

Fuck Me Jesus was banned in seven countries following its CD release, due to its controversial title and explicit cover art.

Three songs, "Departure from the Mortals", "The Black..." and "Within the Abyss" were all re-recorded for the band's 1992 debut, Dark Endless.

== Track listing ==
No.	Title	Length
1.	"Intro/Fuck Me Jesus"	0:38
2.	"Departure from the Mortals"	3:18
3.	"The Black..."	4:04
4.	"Within the Abyss"	3:39
5.	"Outro/Shut Up and Suffer" (instrumental)	0:59
Total length:		12:40

Reissue bonus tracks
No.	Title	Length
6.	"Dark Endless" (Demo version)	3:51
7.	"In Conspiracy with Satan" (Bathory cover)	2:16
8.	"Woman of Dark Desires" (Bathory cover)	4:30
Total length:		23:19

== Musical style ==
In his book Swedish Death Metal, Daniel Ekeroth describes Fuck Me Jesus as "a very death metal–sounding recording with a heavy and fat sound. The song structures are basically death metal as well, combining heavy riffs with hammering two-beats. What makes a difference are some occasional grind parts, melodic guitars, and of course the hellish vocals of Andreas."

== Personnel ==
- Andreas Axelsson – vocals
- Morgan Steinmeyer Håkansson – guitar
- Rikard Kalm – bass
- Joakim Göthberg – drums, vocals
- Dan Swanö – mixing
