= La Grande Danse Macabre =

Studio album by Marduk
- Released: March 5, 2001
- Recorded: December 2000
- Studio: The Abyss, Pärlby, Sweden
- Genre: Black metal
- Length: 46:00
- Label: Regain Records; Century Media
- Producer: Marduk

Marduk chronology
Infernal Eternal (2000)	La Grande Danse Macabre (2001)	Blackcrowned (2002)

Alternative Cover
- Alternative cover

Professional ratings
Review scores
Source	Rating
AllMusic	3/5 stars

La Grande Danse Macabre is the seventh studio album by Swedish black metal band Marduk. It was recorded and mixed at The Abyss in December 2000 and released on March 5, 2001, by Regain Records. La Grande Danse Macabre is the last Marduk album with Fredrik Andersson on drums.

The Century Media release has different cover art, one found on T-shirts.

The album's title is French for "The Great Dance of Death".

The title track ends with a quote from Johan Olof Wallins poem "Angel of Death".

== Themes ==
On La Grande Danse Macabre, the theme is death. The lyrical themes are primarily reflective of this, with litterings present of the Satanic themes on which the band initially based themselves. The band's previous albums had been themed on blood (Nightwing) and fire (Panzer Division Marduk), forming a trilogy of "Blood, Fire and Death". This trio of albums are considered as Marduk's tribute to Bathory, and their 1988 breakthrough album, Blood Fire Death.

== Track listing ==
No.	Title	Length
1.	"Ars Moriendi" (instrumental)	1:51
2.	"Azrael"	3:06
3.	"Pompa Funebris 1660" (instrumental)	2:36
4.	"Obedience unto Death"	3:16
5.	"Bonds of Unholy Matrimony"	7:03
6.	"La Grande Danse Macabre"	8:11
7.	"Death Sex Ejaculation"	5:11
8.	"Funeral Bitch"	4:58
9.	"Summers End"	4:41
10.	"Jesus Christ... Sodomized"	4:33
Total length:		45:25

Limited edition bonus track
No.	Title	Length
11.	"Samhain" (Samhain cover)	1:29
Total length:		47:04

== Personnel ==
Marduk

- Legion – vocals
- Morgan Steinmeyer Håkansson – guitar
- B. War – bass guitar
- Fredrik Andersson – drums

Guest

- Peter Tägtgren – mixing
