= Mother of Disease =

Studio album by Puissance
- Released: 1998
- Recorded: 1997–1998
- Genre: Martial industrial, neoclassical dark wave
- Producer: Fredrik Söderlund, Henry Möller

Mother of Disease is a full-length album by Puissance in 1998. A remastered reissue was released in 2008 with one bonus track called The Dancing Clowns.

It was rated a seven out of ten by Release Magazine.

== Track listing ==
1. "Light of a Dead Sun" 05:05
2. "Reign of Dying Angels" 05:02
3. "Mother of Disease" 05:56
4. "In Shining Armour" 04:34
5. "Post Ruin Symphony" 06:49
6. "Core of Revelation" 05:07
7. "Human Error" 05:03
8. "The Voice of Chaos" 06:55
9. "The Dancing Clowns" 04:03 [Only available on 2008 version]
