= Amorous Anathema =

Studio album by Embraced
- Released: April 1998
- Recorded: 1997 at Studio Fredman
- Genre: Melodic black metal
- Length: 47:08
- Label: Regain
- Producer: Anders Fridén

Embraced chronology
Amorous Anathema (1998)	Within (2000)

Amorous Anathema is the debut studio album by the Swedish melodic black metal band Embraced, released in 1998 through Regain Records. It was recorded in November 1997 at Studio Fredman and mastered at Masteringroom. In 2003 Regain Records re-released the album with two bonus tracks recorded during the Within session.

== Track listing ==
No.	Title	Length
1.	"A Dying Flame"	6:33
2.	"The End... And Here We All Die"	8:35
3.	"Nightfall"	5:26
4.	"Princess of Twilight"	5:00
5.	"Into the Unknown"	4:12
6.	"Memento of Emotions"	7:04
7.	"The Beautiful Flow of an Autumn Passion"	3:14
8.	"Dirge of the Masquerade"	7:04
9.	"Big in Japan" (Alphaville cover) (2003 re-release bonus track)	3:27
10.	"Book of Keys" (2003 re-release bonus track)	6:54
Total length:		57:29

== Personnel ==
- Kalle Johansson - vocals, didgeridoo on "The End... And Here We All Die"
- Daniel Lindberg - drums
- Julius Chmielewski - keyboards
- Sven Karlsson - keyboards, piano, mastering
- Michael Håkansson - bass, vocals, mastering, cover art and layout concept
- Davor Tepic - guitars
- Peter Mårdklint - guitars

== Additional personnel ==
- Kalle Metz - additional vocals on "The Beautiful Flow of an Autumn Passion"
- Lasse Hejll - photography
- Helene Toresdotter - cover art, photography
- Göran Finnberg - mastering
- Anders Fridén - producer, mixing
- Fredrik Nordström - engineering
- Ron Boldsurfer - logo
