= Warschau (disambiguation) =

Warschau may refer to:

- German and Dutch name of Warsaw, Poland
- Warschau (album)
- KL Warschau, or Warsaw concentration camp, Nazi concentration camp in the city
