= Nightwing (album) =

Studio album by Marduk
- Released: 6 April 1998
- Recorded: October–November 1997
- Studio: The Abyss, Pärlby, Sweden
- Genre: Black metal
- Length: 47:23
- Label: Osmose Productions
- Producer: Marduk

Marduk chronology
Here's No Peace (1997)	Nightwing (1998)	Panzer Division Marduk (1999)

Nightwing is the fifth studio album by Swedish black metal band Marduk. It was recorded and mixed at The Abyss between October and November 1997 and released in April 1998 by Osmose Productions. The theme of the album was blood, as the band's following, war-related studio album's Panzer Division Marduk would be fire, and La Grande Danse Macabre would be death, forming a trilogy of "Blood, Fire and Death," an homage to Bathory's Blood Fire Death album.

In 2008, Nightwing was re-released by Regain Records with a new mastering, an alternative cover artwork and a live DVD of a show in Rotterdam 1998.

== Music and lyrics ==
John Serba of AllMusic characterized the music on Nightwing as "spewing forth the ugliest, fastest, nastiest, most blasphemous music humanly possible."

On Nightwing, the theme is blood, divided in two parts: The first in the Satanic ways customary of Marduk's lyrics, but the second part tells the history of Vlad 'Tepes' Draculea, the Impaler of Wallachia who fought against the Ottoman invasion on Europe, giving continuity to the history started on "Deme Quaden Thyrane", a track from their third studio album, Opus Nocturne, and continued with "Dracul Va Domni Din Nou in Transylvania" from Heaven Shall Burn... When We Are Gathered. The last verses of "Dracul Va Domni Din Nou in Transylvania" are not sung, but they say "Greater stories are yet to be told". "Deme Quaden Thyrane" appears also here, rearranged, with Legion's vocals and a little change in the lyrics at the end.

The introduction to the track "Slay The Nazarene" is a line from the 1973 film The Wicker Man. The main musical theme of the track "Nightwing" is a variation on the main musical theme recurring in the Subspecies films released by Full Moon Features. The final song of the album, "Anno Domini 1476", ends with a sample from the fascist march "La Luptă, Muncitori" ("The Legionary Worker's March") by the Romanian Iron Guard.

== Artwork ==
In 2024, Joe DiVita of Loudwire said of the album's cover artwork: "Just imagine walking through a barren city at night, dimly lit with a cold breeze rustling the leaves. You hear something and look skyward to see this menacing creature rapidly closing in on you and you know there’s only precious seconds left before it begins eviscerating you. Marduk’s artillery fire sound is the sonic equivalent of death and they channeled it in visual form on Nightwing." He included the artwork among "the 31 scariest metal album covers of all time."

== Reception and legacy ==
Professional ratings
Review scores
Source	Rating
AllMusic	2.5/5 stars
Chronicles of Chaos	7.5/10
Collector's Guide to Heavy Metal	7/10
Rock Hard	8.0/10

John Serba of AllMusic wrote: "For the most part, riffs, verses, choruses, intros, and outros are interchangeable from song to song (possibly album to album, in Marduk's case), and ultimately lack definition. Admirable only for its overall audaciousness, Nightwing is, at best, a fair "true black metal" album (read: no keyboards) with decent production values, but ultimately plays second (or third) fiddle to better releases by fellow Scandinavian hellraisers Mayhem, Emperor, and Immortal." Canadian journalist Martin Popoff appreciated Peter Tatgren's mix and found in the music "lots of layers, pretty cool drumming, and a sound that is still just like ten others bands."

== Track listings ==
All tracks are written by Marduk.

Chapter I - Dictionnaire Infernal
No.	Title	Length
1.	"Preludium" (instrumental)	2:09
2.	"Bloodtide (XXX)"	6:43
3.	"Of Hells Fire"	5:22
4.	"Slay the Nazarene"	3:48
5.	"Nightwing"	7:34

Chapter II - The Warlord of Wallachia
No.	Title	Length
6.	"Dreams of Blood and Iron"	6:19
7.	"Dracole Wayda"	4:07
8.	"Kaziklu Bey (The Lord Impaler)"	4:02
9.	"Deme Quaden Thyrane"	5:06
10.	"Anno Domini 1476"	2:13

Note: The chapter to which the title track belongs is uncertain, as "Nightwing" is completely absent from the track listing on the back cover of the album, despite being track 5 on the disc. Probably it is an interlude between the fast blast beat of the first chapter and the darker, slower second chapter.

=== Re-Issue bonus DVD ===
Live in Rotterdam 1998

1. "Of Hells Fire"
2. "Those of the Unlight"
3. "Slay the Nazarene"
4. "The Black..."
5. "Still Fucking Dead"
6. "Sulphur Souls"
7. "Dreams of Blood and Iron"
8. "Beyond the Grace of God"

== Personnel ==
Marduk

- Legion – vocals
- Morgan Steinmeyer Håkansson – guitar
- B. War – bass
- Fredrik Andersson – drums

Production

- Peter Tägtgren – engineer, mixing
