= Iron Dawn (EP) =

EP by Marduk
- Released: 27 May 2011
- Recorded: March 2011 at Endarker Studio
- Genre: Black metal
- Length: 13:03
- Label: Regain Records
- Producer: Marduk, Devo Andersson

Marduk chronology
Wormwood (2009)	Iron Dawn (2011)	Serpent Sermon (2012)

Iron Dawn is the fifth EP by Swedish black metal band Marduk. It was recorded and mixed at Endarker Studio in March 2011 and released that May by Regain Records on CD and limited vinyl.

== Track listing ==
No.	Title	Length
1.	"Warschau 2: Headhunter Halfmoon"	4:01
2.	"Wacht am Rhein: Drumbeats of Death"	4:17
3.	"Prochorovka: Blood And Sunflowers"	4:45

== Personnel ==
Marduk

- Mortuus – vocals
- Morgan Steinmeyer Håkansson – guitar
- Magnus "Devo" Andersson – bass, mixing
- Lars Broddesson – drums
