= Puissance (band) =

Swedish musical group

Puissance is a Swedish martial neoclassical music group formed in 1993 consisting of members Henry Möller (who also plays in Arditi) and Frederik Söderlund.

== Overview ==
Due to their aesthetic approach and past member associations, Puissance are often associated with black metal. However, Puissance do not use guitars but rather electronic instruments such as synthesizers and samplers, resulting in a militant approach somewhere between industrial music and bombastic neoclassical music. Later albums display more of an emphasis on rhythm and a more pop music-based approach.

Nuclear holocaust and misanthropy are commonly explored themes. Lyrics are sung in English although they made some Swedish songs in the beginning of their career on their demo tapes (and most recently, a bonus track on the 2007 album "Grace of God").

== Discography ==
=== Albums and EPs ===
Year	Title	Format, Special Notes
1995	Krig	Demo
1995	Obey, Hate, Die	Demo
1996	Let Us Lead	CD, LP
1997	Totalitarian Hearts	EP
1998	Back in Control	CD
1999	Mother of Disease	CD, LP
1999	War On	CD
2000	A Call to Arms	EP 7"
2000	Genocidal	EP
2000	Hail the Mushroom Cloud	EP
2001	Total Cleansing	CD
2003	To Give Death by the Sword of Christ	split EP with Sorhin
2004	State Collapse	CD
2007	Grace of God	CD
