= Frontschwein =

Studio album by Marduk
- Released: 19 January 2015
- Recorded: September – October 2014
- Studio: Endarker (Norrköping, Sweden)
- Genre: Black metal
- Length: 52:39
- Label: Century Media
- Producer: Marduk

Marduk chronology
Serpent Sermon (2012)	Frontschwein (2015)	Viktoria (2018)

Frontschwein (German slang for "front pig"; see glossary of German military terms) is the thirteenth studio album by Swedish black metal band Marduk. It was released on 19 January 2015 through Century Media Records. It is the band's first album to feature drummer Fredrik Widigs.

== Track listing ==
All music and lyrics written by Marduk.

No.	Title	Length
1.	"Frontschwein"	3:13
2.	"The Blond Beast"	4:26
3.	"Afrika"	4:00
4.	"Wartheland"	4:17
5.	"Rope of Regret"	3:52
6.	"Between the Wolf-Packs"	4:28
7.	"Nebelwerfer"	6:17
8.	"Falaise: Cauldron of Blood"	4:58
9.	"Doomsday Elite"	8:11
10.	"503"	5:12
11.	"Thousand-Fold Death"	3:45
12.	"Warschau III - Necropolis"	2:48

== Credits ==
=== Marduk ===
- Mortuus – vocals; Holy Poison Design – layout
- Morgan (Patrik Niclas Morgan Håkansson) – guitar
- Devo (Dan Evert Magnus Andersson) – bass guitar; engineering
- Fredrik Widigs – drums

=== Additional personnel ===
- Jens Rydén – photography

== Charts ==
Chart (2017)	Peak position
Austrian Albums (Ö3 Austria)	63
Belgian Albums (Ultratop Flanders)	81
Belgian Albums (Ultratop Wallonia)	126
Dutch Albums (Album Top 100)	83
Finnish Albums (Suomen virallinen lista)	25
French Albums (SNEP)	123
German Albums (Offizielle Top 100)	34
Swedish Albums (Sverigetopplistan)	23
Swiss Albums (Schweizer Hitparade)	74
US Heatseekers Albums (Billboard)	25
