= Marduk (band) =

Swedish black metal band

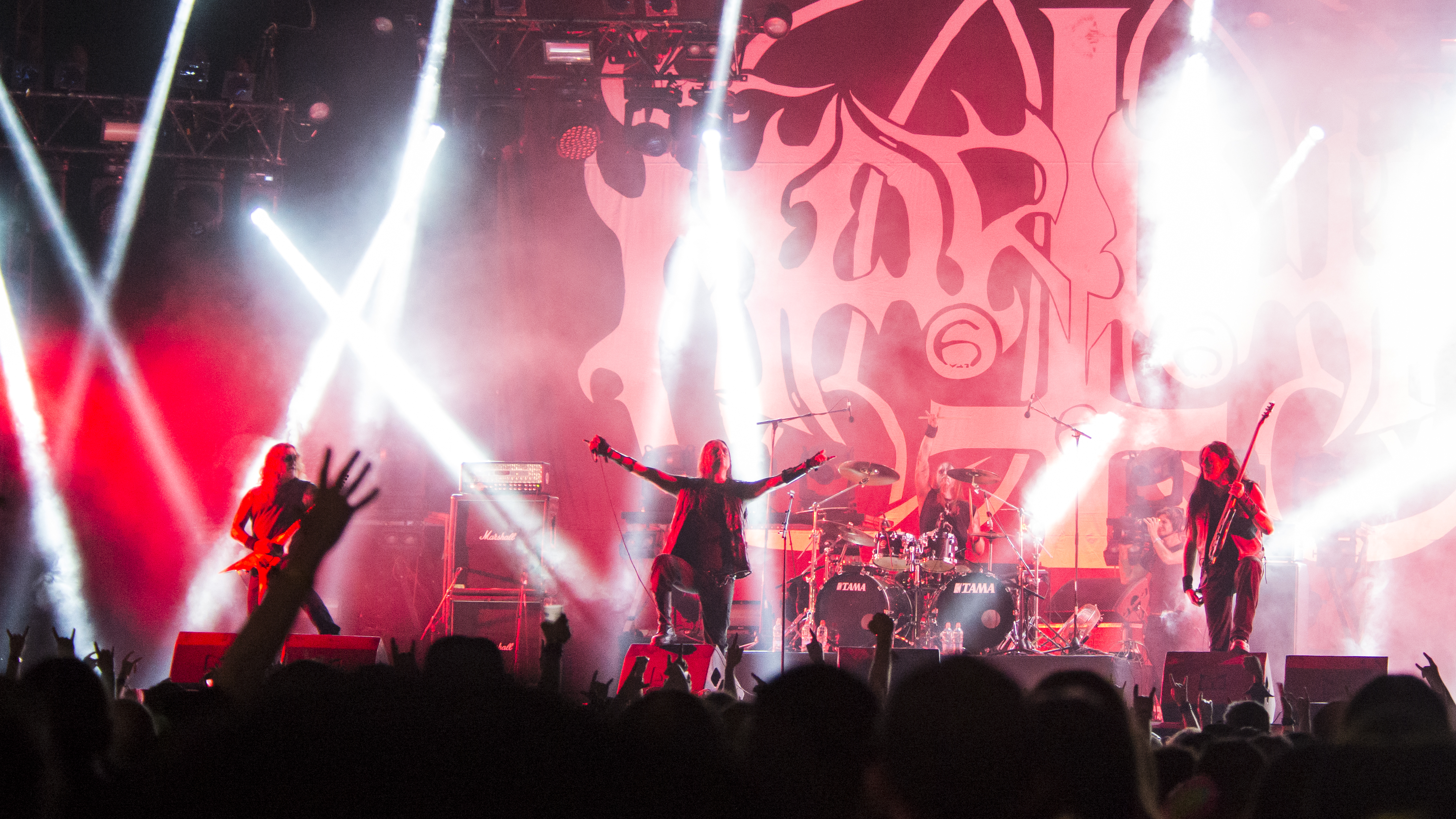
- Marduk at Hellfest 2017

Background information
- Origin: Norrköping, Sweden
- Genres: Black metal; death metal (early)
- Years active: 1990–present
- Labels: No Fashion, Osmose, Regain, Blooddawn, Century Media
- Members: Morgan Håkansson; Mortuus; Simon Wizén; Simon “Bloodhammer” Schilling
- Website: marduk.nu

Marduk (/ˈmɑːrdʊk/) is a Swedish black metal band formed in Norrköping in 1990. The band released their debut full-length album, Dark Endless, in 1992 on No Fashion Records. They are named after Ancient Babylonian deity Marduk.

== History ==
Guitarist Morgan Steinmeyer Håkansson formed Marduk to be the "most blasphemous band in the world". In Marduk's first two releases, the 1991 EP Fuck Me Jesus and their debut album, Dark Endless the following year, they played black metal with death metal influences. For these releases, the lineup consisted of Håkansson, vocalist Andreas 'Dread' Axelsson, guitarist Magnus 'Devo' Andersson, bassist Rikard Kalm and drummer Joakim 'Av Gravf' Göthberg. Dan Swanö of Edge of Sanity mixed both albums.

Following Dark Endless, Axelsson and Kalm left the band. Göthberg took over vocals, while Roger 'B. War' Svensson joined as bassist. This lineup recorded their second album, Those of the Unlight, in April 1993, mixed by Swanö. Those of the Unlight featured a more melodic black metal sound and lacked the previous death metal undertones. The band continued this style on Opus Nocturne, released on 12 December 1994, which featured drummer Fredrik Andersson, while Göthberg focused on vocals. It was the first album without Magnus Andersson, who left earlier that year.

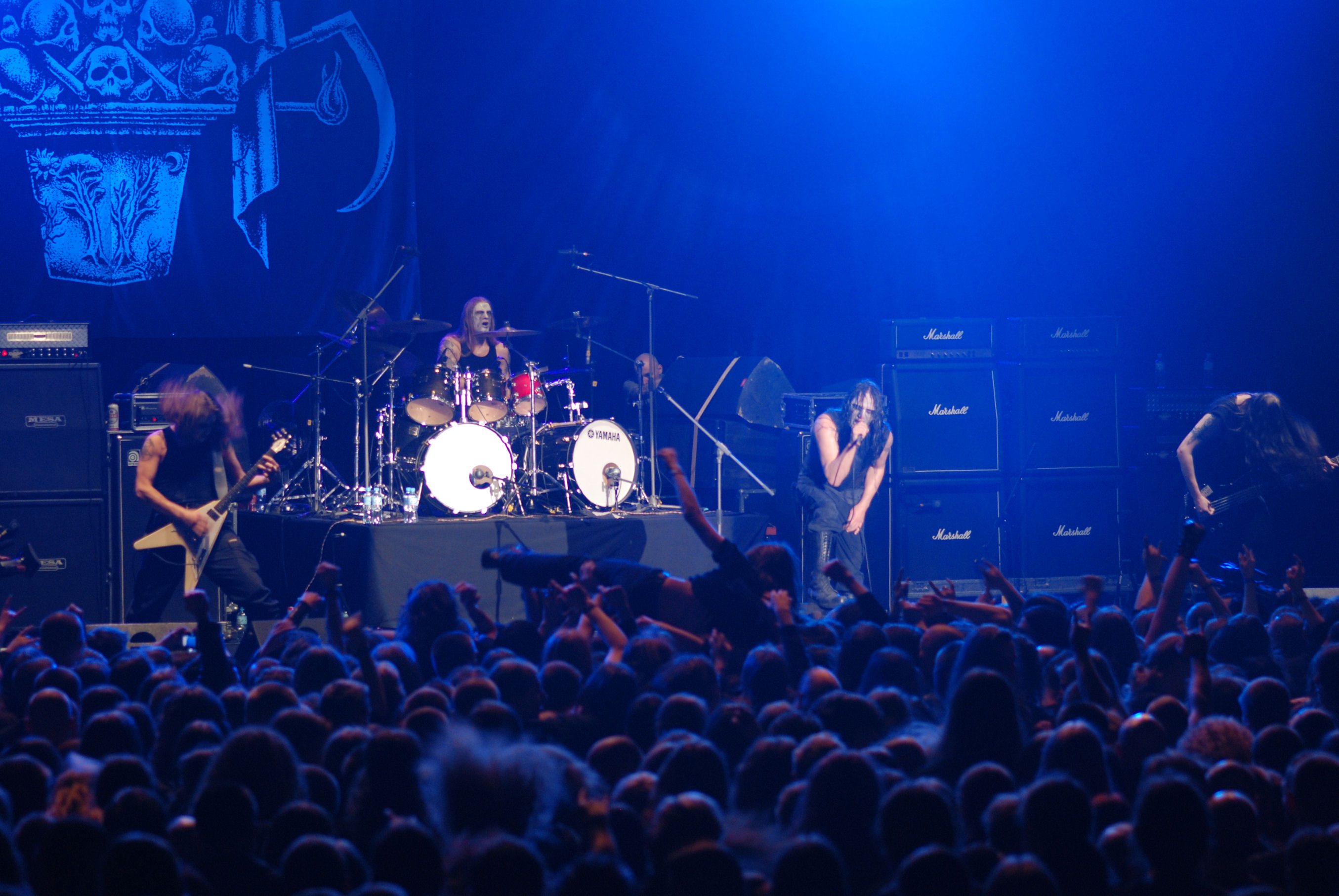
Marduk performing live at Metalmania, 2008

Göthberg left Marduk in 1995, citing boredom. Marduk recruited singer Erik 'Legion' Hagstedt, formerly of Swedish black metal band Ophthalamia. This was followed by their fourth full-length album, Heaven Shall Burn... When We Are Gathered, with Peter Tägtgren of Hypocrisy at The Abyss Studio in January 1996. The album was released on 1 July 1996.

Aside from Emil Dragutinovic replacing Fredrik Andersson in 2002, this line-up remained largely unchanged. They released Nightwing, Panzer Division Marduk, La Grande Danse Macabre, and World Funeral between 1998 and 2003. Tägtgren mixed all those albums. Due to dissatisfaction with the band's direction and deteriorated personal relationships, Hagstedt departed the band in 2003, followed by Svensson the following year. Hagstedt was replaced with Daniel 'Mortuus' Rostén, known for Funeral Mist, while former second guitarist Magnus Andersson returned to the band as bassist.

Marduk planned to tour the United States in September 2016 with Carach Angren, Rotting Christ, and Necronomicon, but cancelled due to delays in acquiring visas. In late February 2017, a planned show at Oakland was cancelled by the venue for safety issues after a local anti-fascist group targeted the band and reportedly threatened the venue staff. Marduk toured the US in the summer of 2017 with Incantation and Abysmal Dawn.

In April 2018, accusations of neo-Nazi sympathies resurfaced when news site Dagens ETC published an article alleging that Fredrik Widigs and Daniel Rostén had placed orders from the Nordic Resistance Movement web shop, according to leaked files from NRM servers. The band denied these accusations and any connection to the Nordic Resistance Movement.

Marduk released their latest studio album, Viktoria, on 22 June 2018. In 2019, Magnus Andersson left the band to focus on studio work. Joel Lindholm replaced him in 2020.

Marduk toured the US with Incantation in early 2023. In May 2023, Lindholm left the band after a video showed him apparently making a Nazi salute during their performance at Incineration Fest in London. Håkansson called the incident "deplorable". The band said they were not aware until after the show, adding that Lindholm was "very drunk" and carried out "a variety of intolerable stage antics". The band was booked to play Bangkok, Thailand in 2023. The band performed at Milwaukee Metal Fest in June 2024.

Former bassist Roger Svensson died in July 2026.

== Musical style and lyrical themes ==
The band's two initial releases, the 1991 EP, Fuck Me Jesus, and their debut album, Dark Endless, combine black metal with death metal. The band's second and third albums, Those of the Unlight and Opus Nocturne, showed a more melodic black metal approach, with the latter hinting at a more chaotic, blast beat-driven style that would be further explored on subsequent albums like Heaven Shall Burn... When We Are Gathered, Nightwing, and Panzer Division Marduk.

Concerning the thematic nature of Marduk's lyrics, the lyrics primarily incorporate Satanism, anti-Christianity, blasphemy, death, Third Reich history, and World War II. Marduk began incorporating the war themes on their 1999 album, Panzer Division Marduk, which continued on in later years such as "The Hangman of Prague" on 2004's Plague Angel, the title being a reference to Reinhard Heydrich — second in command of the SS — in his capacity as the de facto Reichsprotektor of Bohemia and Moravia.

== Legacy ==
Thom Jurek of AllMusic wrote: "Marduk's unswerving commitment to blasphemy and extreme music, a catalog of well-regarded recordings, and a relentless touring schedule established them as one of Scandinavia's best known black metal acts."

== Members ==
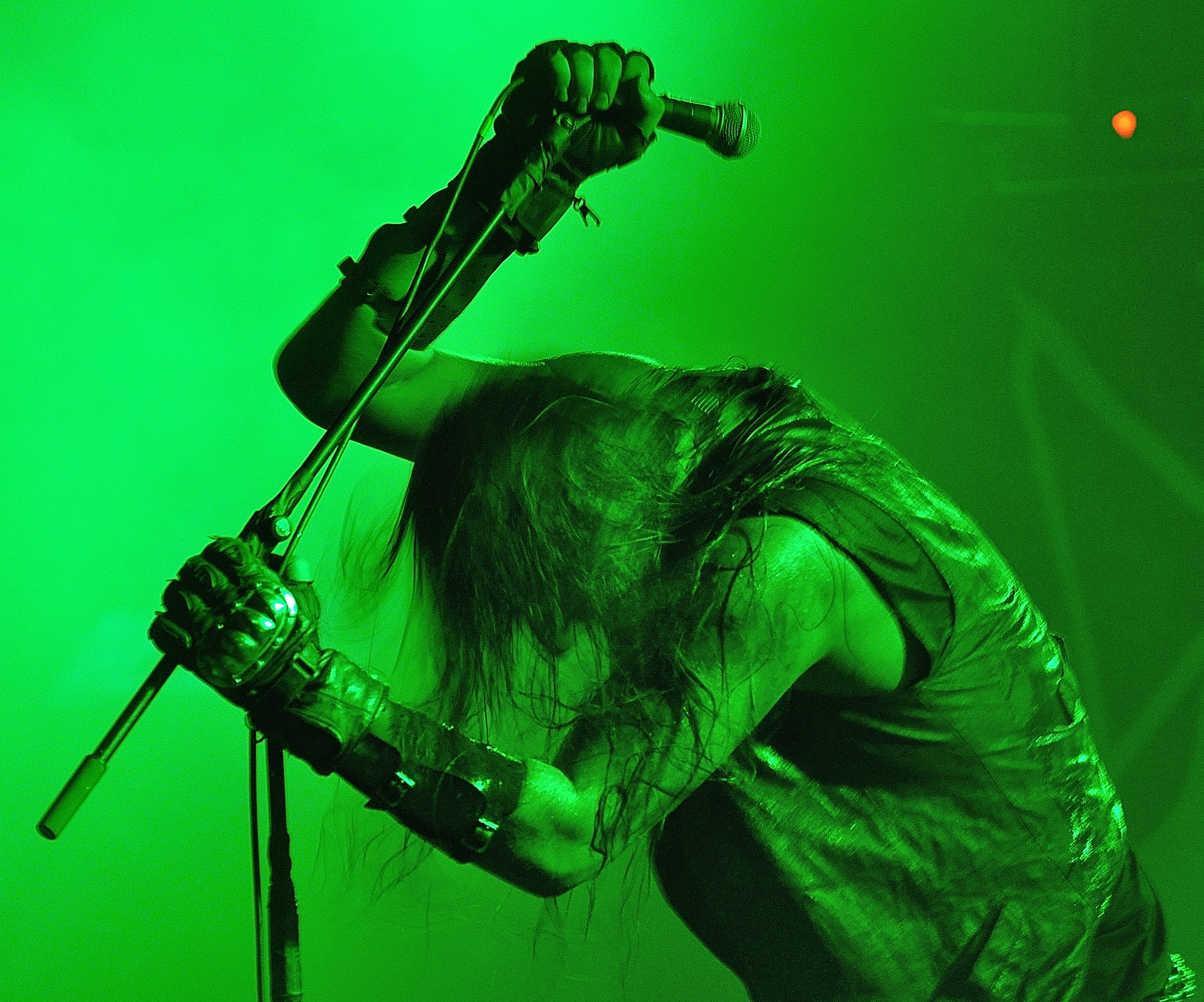
Vocalist Daniel "Mortuus" Rostèn in 2015

=== Current members ===
- Morgan Steinmeyer Håkansson – guitars (1990–present)
- Mortuus (Daniel Rostén) – vocals (2004–present)
- Bloodhammer (Simon Schilling) – drums (2019–present)

=== Former members ===
- Af Gravf (Joakim Göthberg) – drums (1990–1993), vocals (1993–1995)
- Dread (Andreas Axelsson) – vocals (1990–1993)
- Rikard Kalm – bass (1990–1992)
- B. War (Roger Svensson) – bass (1992–2004; died 2026)
- Devo (Magnus Andersson) – guitars (1992–1994), bass (2004–2019, 2023)
- Legion (Erik Hagstedt) – vocals (1995–2003)
- Froding (Fredrik Andersson) – drums (1993–2002)
- Emil Dragutinovic – drums (2002–2006)
- Lars Broddesson – drums (2006–2013)
- Fredrik Widigs – drums (2013–2018)
- Joel Lindholm – bass (2020–2023)

=== Live members ===
- Kim Osara – guitars (1995–1996)
- Peter Tägtgren – guitars (1996)
- Simon Wizén – bass (2023–present)

== Discography ==
=== Studio albums ===
- Dark Endless (1992)
- Those of the Unlight (1993)
- Opus Nocturne (1994)
- Heaven Shall Burn... When We Are Gathered (1996)
- Nightwing (1998)
- Panzer Division Marduk (1999)
- La Grande Danse Macabre (2001)
- World Funeral (2003)
- Plague Angel (2004)
- Rom 5:12 (2007)
- Wormwood (2009)
- Serpent Sermon (2012)
- Frontschwein (2015)
- Viktoria (2018)
- Memento Mori (2023)

=== Live albums and compilations ===
- Live in Germania (1997)
- Infernal Eternal (2000)
- Blackcrowned (2002)
- Warschau (2006)
- Beast of Prey: Brutal Assault (2024)

=== Demos and EPs ===
- Fuck Me Jesus (1991)
- Glorification (1996)
- Here's No Peace (1997)
- Obedience (2000)
- Deathmarch (2004)
- Iron Dawn (2011)

=== Singles ===
- "Slay the Nazarene" (2002)
- "Hearse" (2003)
- "Souls for Belial" (2012)
- "Werwolf" (2018)

=== DVDs ===
- Funeral Marches and Warsongs (2004)
- Blackcrowned (2005)
- Blood Puke Salvation (2006)
