= Regain Records =

Swedish record label

- Founded: 1997
- Founder: Per Gyllenbäck
- Distributor: Various
- Genre: Heavy metal, death metal, black metal, thrash metal
- Country of origin: Sweden
- Location: Hjärup, Sweden
- Official website: regainrecords.se

Regain Records is a Swedish-based independent record label focused on heavy metal and extreme metal. It was founded from what remained of the former label, Wrong Again Records, by Per Gyllenbäck in 1997. Wrong Again Records had such bands as In Flames, Cryptopsy, Arch Enemy, and Naglfar among its ranks.

Regain Records' first two releases were Deranged's High on Blood and Embraced's Amorous Anathema in late 1997. In the first two years of operation, business for the label was slow, due to lack of proper distribution. It was not until Regain Records re-released the first two in Flames albums, Lunar Strain and Subterranean, which were previously released under the name Wrong Again Records, that the label began to prosper.

In 2008, the label was involved in a legal dispute with the band Gorgoroth over their 2008 live album.

== Current and former acts ==
- Acid Drinkers
- Astaroth
- Behemoth
- Bewitched
- Blackwinds
- The Bronx Casket Co.
- Centinex
- The Colombos
- Cryptopsy
- The Curse of Sahara
- Danzig
- Dark Funeral
- Death SS
- Defleshed
- Deranged
- Devils Whorehouse
- Die Zombiejäger
- Dimension Zero
- Dismember
- Embraced
- Endstille
- Enthroned
- Entombed
- Fall Ov Serafim
- Gorgoroth
- Grave
- Hermano
- Karmakanic
- Machinery
- Marduk
- Mefisto
- Mephistofeles
- Merauder
- Murder Island
- Mustasch
- Nifelheim
- Ophiolatry
- Overkill
- Pro-Pain
- Ragnarok
- Reptilian
- Sahg
- Sargatanas Reign
- Satariel
- Setherial
- Space Odyssey
- Tenebre
- Thyrfing
- Time Has Come
- Time Requiem
- Tony Naima & the Bitters
- Torchbearer
- Totalt Jävla Mörker
- Trelldom
- Trendkill
- Trident
- Unanimated
- Vader
