= Kataklysm discography =

This is the discography for Canadian death metal band Kataklysm.

== Studio albums ==
List of studio albums, with selected chart positions
| Year | Album details | Peak chart positions | | | |
| Year | Album details | AUT | GER | SWI | US Heat. |
|---|---|---|---|---|---|
| 1995 | Sorcery: Released: February 10, 1995; Label: Nuclear Blast | — | — | — | — |
| 1996 | Temple of Knowledge: Released: June 26, 1996; Label: Nuclear Blast | — | — | — | — |
| 1998 | Victims of this Fallen World: Released: October 5, 1998; Label: Hypnotic | — | — | — | — |
| 2000 | The Prophecy (Stigmata of the Immaculate): Released: April 17, 2000; Label: Nuclear Blast | — | — | — | — |
| 2001 | Epic: The Poetry of War: Released: September 3, 2001; Label: Nuclear Blast | — | — | — | — |
| 2002 | Shadows & Dust: Released: October 15, 2002; Label: Nuclear Blast | — | — | — | — |
| 2004 | Serenity in Fire: Released: March 9, 2004; Label: Nuclear Blast | — | — | — | — |
| 2006 | In the Arms of Devastation: Released: February 21, 2006; Label: Nuclear Blast | — | 76 | — | — |
| 2008 | Prevail: Released: May 23, 2008; Label: Nuclear Blast | 44 | 38 | 83 | 15 |
| 2010 | Heaven's Venom: Released: August 13, 2010; Label: Nuclear Blast | 32 | 35 | 53 | 8 |
| 2013 | Waiting for the End to Come: Released: October 25, 2013; Label: Nuclear Blast | 63 | 55 | 62 | 20 |
| 2015 | Of Ghosts and Gods: Released: July 31, 2015; Label: Nuclear Blast | 37 | 27 | 31 | 6 |
| 2018 | Meditations: Released: June 1, 2018; Label: Nuclear Blast | 30 | 21 | 23 | 3 |
| 2020 | Unconquered: Released: September 25, 2020; Label: Nuclear Blast | 50 | 33 | 39 | - |
| 2023 | Goliath: Released: August 11, 2023; Label: Nuclear Blast | 46 | 11 | 29 | - |
"—" denotes a recording that did not chart in that territory.

== Live albums ==
List of live albums, with selected chart positions
| Year | Album details | Peak chart positions |
| Year | Album details | GER |
|---|---|---|
| 1998 | Northern Hyperblast Live: Released: 1998; Label: Hypnotic | — |
| 2007 | Live in Deutschland – The Devastation Begins: Released: February 20, 2007; Label: Nuclear Blast | — |
| 2012 | Iron Will: 20 Years Determined: Released: July 3, 2012; Label: Nuclear Blast | 98 |
"—" denotes a recording that did not chart in that territory.

== EPs ==
List of EPs
| Year | Album details |
|---|---|
| 1993 | The Mystical Gate of Reincarnation: Released: November 30, 1993; Label: Nuclear Blast |
| 1994 | Vision the Chaos: Released: 1994; Label: Boundless |

== Demos ==
List of Demos
| Year | Album details |
|---|---|
| 1992 | The Death Gate Cycle of Reincarnation: Released: February 1992; Label: Socan |
| 1993 | The Vortex of Resurrection: Released: 1993; Label: Nuclear Blast |
| 1993 | Rehearsal: Released: March 1993; Label: |

== Split albums ==
List of split albums
| Year | Album details |
|---|---|
| 1995 | Dream II: split with Katatonia, Therion, Dismember and Pan.Thy.Monium; Released: 1995; Label: Morbid Noizz Productions |

== Music videos ==
| Title | Year | Directed | Album | Ref |
|---|---|---|---|---|
| "The Awakener" | 1996 | Maurice Deverault | Temple of Knowledge | |
| "In Shadows & Dust" | 2002 | SVBell | Shadows & Dust | |
| "As I Slither" | 2004 | Joe Lynch | Serenity in Fire | |
| "Crippled & Broken" | 2006 | Maurice Swinkels | In the Arms of Devastation | |
| "To Reign Again" | 2006 | Maurice Swinkels | In the Arms of Devastation | |
| "Taking the World by Storm" | 2008 | David Brodsky | Prevail | |
| "Blood in Heaven" | 2009 | Maxime Hebert | Prevail | |
| "Push the Venom" | 2010 | Ivan Colic | Heaven's Venom | |
| "At the Edge of the World" | 2011 | Tommy Jones | Heaven's Venom | |
| "Iron Will" | 2012 | Tommy Jones | Iron Will | |
| "Elevate" | 2013 | — | Waiting for the End to Come | |
| "The American Way" | 2014 | Tommy Jones | Waiting for the End to Come | |
| "Breaching the Asylum" | 2015 | — | Of Ghosts and Gods | — |
| "The Black Sheep" | 2015 | — | Of Ghosts and Gods | — |
| "Marching Through Graveyards" | 2015 | — | Of Ghosts and Gods | — |
| "Thy Serpent's Tongue" | 2015 | — | Of Ghosts and Gods | — |
| "Vindication" | 2015 | — | Of Ghosts and Gods | — |
| "Soul Destroyer" | 2015 | — | Of Ghosts and Gods | — |
| "Carrying Crosses" | 2015 | — | Of Ghosts and Gods | — |
| "Shattered" | 2015 | — | Of Ghosts and Gods | — |
| "Hate Spirit" | 2015 | — | Of Ghosts and Gods | — |
| "The World Is a Dying Insect" | 2015 | — | Of Ghosts and Gods | — |
