= Jean-François Dagenais =

Canadian record producer and musician

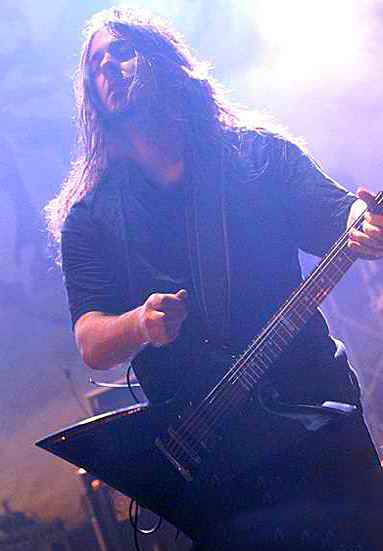
- Dagenais in 2012

Background information
- Also known as: J-F Dagenais
- Born: October 16, 1975 (age 50); Montreal, Quebec, Canada
- Genres: Heavy metal, death metal
- Occupations: Musician, recording engineer, record producer, mix engineer
- Instrument: Guitar
- Years active: 1991–present
- Member of: Kataklysm, Ex Deo
- Website: www.jfdstudio.net

Jean-François Dagenais (French pronunciation: [ʒɑ̃ fʁɑ̃swa daʒnɛ]; born October 16, 1975) is a Juno Award winner, French-Canadian record producer, mix engineer, guitarist and songwriter specializing in the rock and metal genres. Born and raised in Canada, Dagenais is now a naturalized citizen of the United States living in Dallas, Texas. He is best known as guitarist for the death metal band Kataklysm and for producing and mixing many heavy metal albums and its subgenres.

== Production work ==
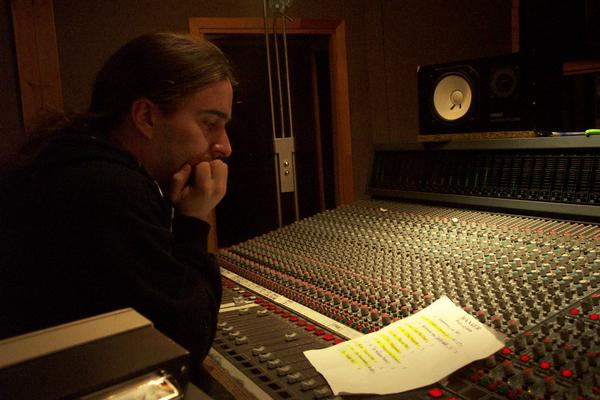
Dagenais in the studio

Currently, Jean-Francois Dagenais works out of his own studio, JFD Studio, which he founded in 2005. he received a Canadian GAMIQ award "Metal / Hardcore Album of the Year" for both his work on Kataklysm's 2010 Heaven's Venom and 2008 Prevail albums, as well as winning an award with Kataklysm for "Best Metal Group" at the Canadian Indie Music Awards.

Dagenais is also known for his mixing and audio mastering work with bands like Malevolent Creation, Misery Index, Despised Icon, Wind Rose, Man Must Die, Macabre, Thy Antichrist, Texas Murder Crew and Ex Deo.

== Kataklysm member ==
Dagenais is the guitarist for the Canadian death metal band Kataklysm. As opposed to many of the original members, he has been with Kataklysm since the band's inception in 1991. He has played guitar for all of these following albums:

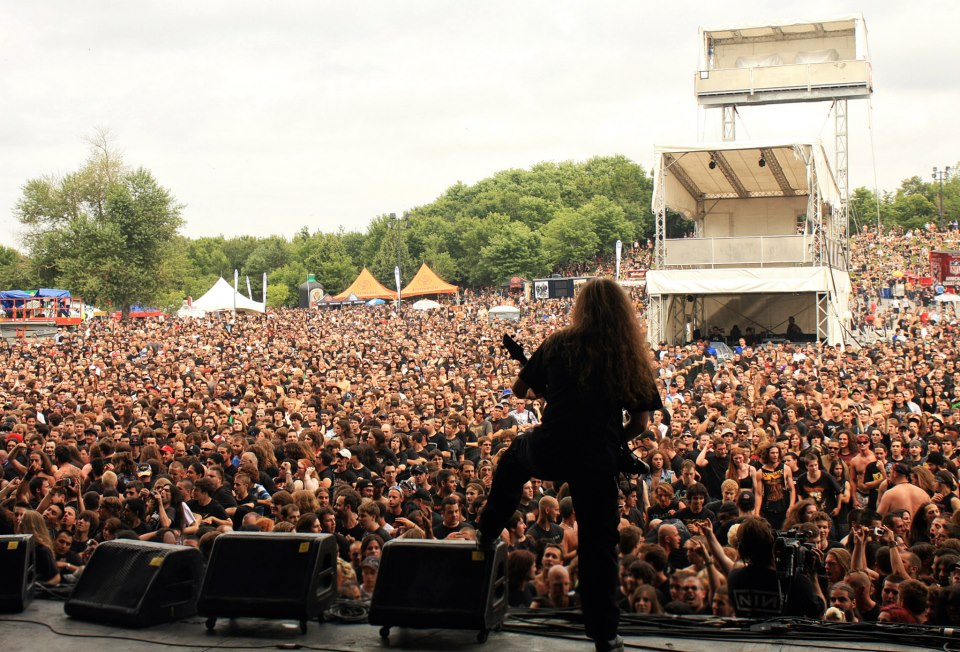
Jean-Francois Dagenais, Heavy MTL festival 2010

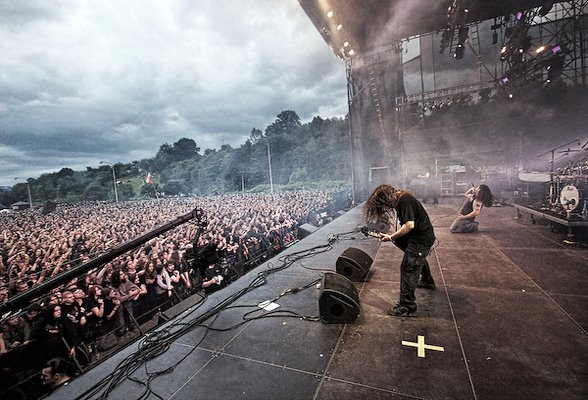
Jean-Francois Dagenais, Masters of Rock festival 2009

=== Albums ===
- Kataklysm The Mystical Gate of Reincarnation (1993)
- Kataklysm Sorcery (1995)
- Kataklysm Temple of Knowledge (1996)
- Kataklysm Victims of this Fallen World (1998)
- Kataklysm The Prophecy (Stigmata of the Immaculate) (2000)
- Kataklysm Epic: The Poetry of War (2001)
- Kataklysm Shadows & Dust (2002)
- Kataklysm Serenity in Fire (2004)
- Kataklysm In the Arms of Devastation (2006)
- Kataklysm Live in Deutschland DVD (2007)
- Kataklysm Prevail (2008)
- Ex Deo Romulus (2009)
- Kataklysm Heaven's Venom (2010)
- Ex Deo Caligvla (2012)
- Kataklysm Iron Will DVD (2012)
- Kataklysm Waiting for the End to Come (2013)
- Kataklysm Of Ghosts and Gods (2015)
- Ex Deo The Immortal Wars (2017)
- Kataklysm Meditations (2018)
- Kataklysm Unconquered (2020)
- Ex Deo The Thirteen Years of Nero (2021)
- Kataklysm Goliath (2023)
- Kataklysm The Rabbit Hole (Single) (2025)

=== Demos ===
- Kataklysm The Death Gate Cycle of Reincarnation (1992)
- Kataklysm Vision the Chaos (1994)

== Producer credits ==
P (Produced)

E (Engineered)

M (Mix)

MA (Mastered)

- Anonymus – Chapter Chaos Beguins – P-E-M
- Augury – Concealed- M
- Augury – Fragmentary Evidence- M
- Derelict – Versus Entropy – M-MA
- Doom's Day – The Unholy (Single 2022) – M-MA
- Devil's Trill – Rattle the Bones – M-MA
- Despised Icon – Split CD/Bodies in the Gears of the apparatus – P-E-M
- Despised Icon – The Healing Process – M
- Enmity – Demagoguery – M-MA
- Enmity – ReEvolution – M-MA
- Ex Deo – Romulus – P-E-M
- Ex Deo – CALIGVLA – P-E-M
- Ex Deo – The Immortal Wars – P-E
- Ex Deo – The Thirteen Years Of Nero – P-E-M-MA
- Ex Deo – Year of the Four Emperors – P-E-M-MA
- Fadrait – Numinous – M-MA
- Go Down Fighting – Anytime Now – M-MA
- Helsott – Will And The Witch – M-MA
- Infernäl Mäjesty – Demo'n God – M
- Ire – I Discern an Overtone of Tragedy in Your Voice – P-E-M
- Kataklysm – Temple of Knowledge – M
- Kataklysm – The Prophecy – P-E-M
- Kataklysm – Epic (The Poetry of War) – P-E-M
- Kataklysm – Shadows & Dust – P-E-M
- Kataklysm – Serenity In Fire – P-E-M
- Kataklysm – In The Arms of Devastation – P-E
- Kataklysm – Live in Deutschland DVD – M
- Kataklysm – Prevail – P-E
- Kataklysm – Heaven's Venom – P-E
- Kataklysm – Iron will DVD – M
- Kataklysm – Waiting For the End to Come – P-E
- Kataklysm – Of Ghosts and Gods – P-E
- Kataklysm – Meditations – P-E
- Kataklysm – Unconquered – P-E
- Kataklysm – Goliath – P-E
- Kataklysm – The Rabbit Hole (single) – P-E-M-MA
- Macabre – Discography Re-Mastered 2019 – MA
- Malevolent Creation – The Will to Kill – E-M
- Malevolent Creation – Warkult – M
- Man Must Die – ...Start Killing – P-E-M
- Man Must Die – The Human Condition – P-E-M
- Man Must Die – The Pain Behind it All – M-MA
- Misery Index – Retaliate – P-E-M
- Mythraeum – Oblivion Aeternam – M-MA
- Necronomicon – Rise of the Elder ones – M-MA
- Necronomicon – Advent of the Human God – M-MA
- Neuraxis – Live Progression – M
- Quo Vadis – Day into night – E
- Quo Vadis – Defiant Indoctrination DVD – E-M
- Redcore – Amyao – P-E-M
- Recurrence – The Exit – M-MA
- Recurrence – Art of Survival – M-MA
- Symbolic – Death tribute DVD – M
- Texas Murder Crew – Wrapped In Their Blood – M-MA
- Thy Antichrist – Wrath of the Beast – M-MA
- Wind Rose – Shadows Over Lothadruin (Remixed 2022) – M-MA
- Wind Rose – Wardens of the West Wind (Remixed 2022) – M-MA
- VARIOUS ARTISTS Nuclear Blast Records – Gathered At The Altar Of Blast (7" Box) – MA
- VARIOUS ARTISTS Nuclear Blast Records – Death ...is Just the Beginning MMXVIII Box Set – MA
