= Quo Vadis (band) =

Canadian metal band

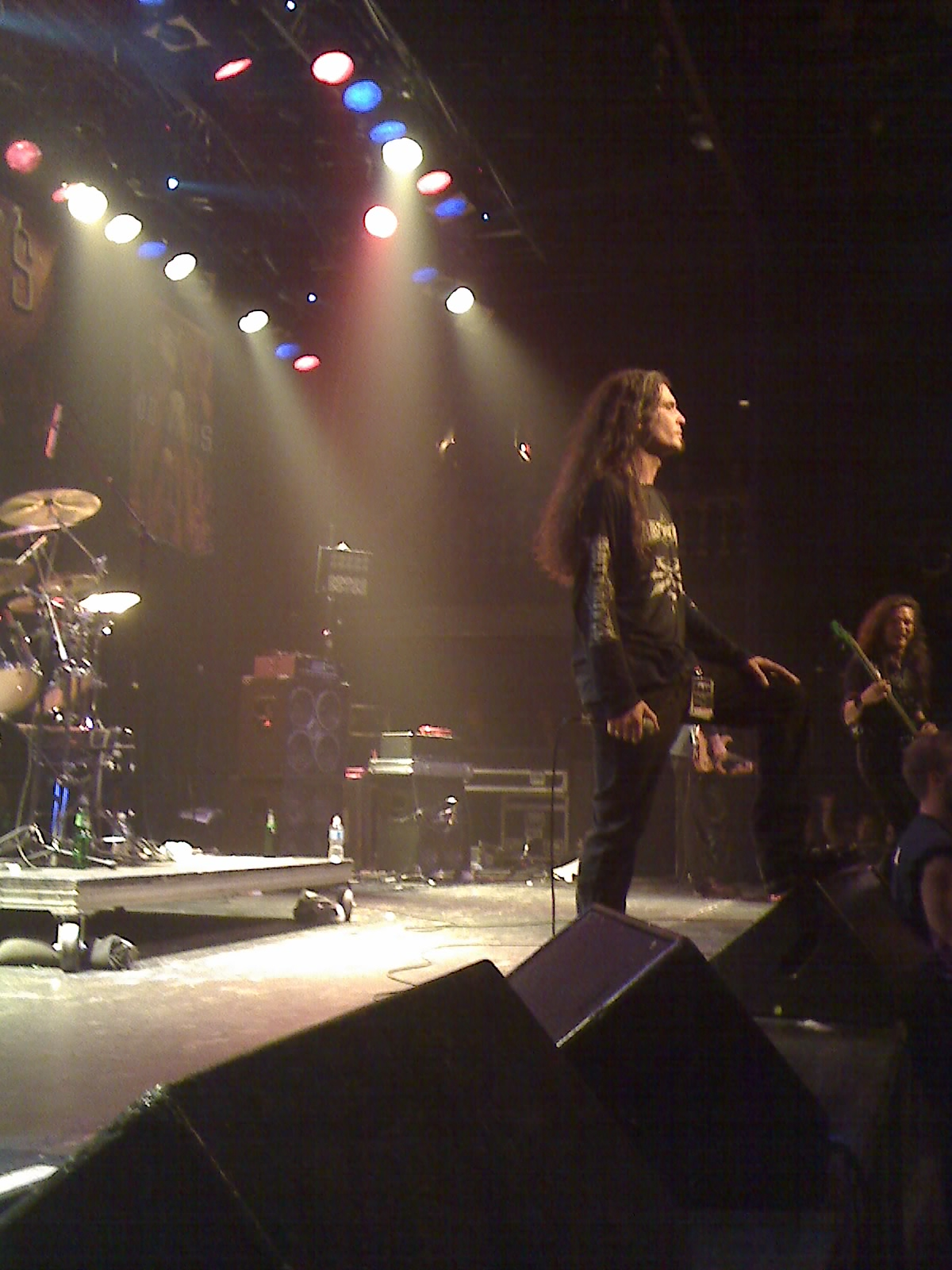
- Quo Vadis at their final show with Stéphane, Forest and Yanic in Montreal, 2008

Background information
- Origin: Montreal, Canada
- Genres: Melodic death metal Technical death metal Progressive metal
- Years active: 1992–2011
- Label: Skyscraper Music
- Past members: See below
- Website: quovadis.qc.ca

Quo Vadis was a Canadian melodic death metal band from Montreal, Quebec, formed in 1992 by Bart Frydrychowicz, Yanic Bercier, and Arie Itman, named after the novel by Polish writer Henryk Sienkiewicz. The band released three studio albums, one compilation album, one demo, one live DVD, one live album and two videos. Not to be confused with a Polish technical death metal band of the same name.

== History ==
=== Formation, Quo Vadis Demo (1992–1995) ===
Guitarists and vocalists Bart Frydrychowicz and Arie Itman and drummer Yanic Bercier formed Quo Vadis in 1992. They played Metallica and Megadeth covers. Over time, the band began to write and play original songs. By 1995, the band wanted to record a demo. Bassist Remy Beauchamp was recruited as a permanent member, and soprano vocalist Sebrina Lipari performed on certain songs live. The Quo Vadis Demo was released on cassette on March 21, 1995, through VomiT Productions and helped establish the band in the Montreal metal scene.

=== Forever... (1996–1998) ===
In early 1996, Quo Vadis recorded their debut album with producer Pierre Rémillard, who had worked with Cryptopsy. On April 10, 1996, Forever... was released and received favorably by fans and critics. Earth AD Records in Germany and Immortal Records in Poland to signed licensing deals with Quo Vadis. Frydrychowicz said of the album, "We recorded a demo which was released as an EP on cassette last year. The reaction was very positive. We were still searching for direction at that time, experimenting with keyboards and femme vox. The music is much more focused now as we have found our sound. Forever... is much more aggressive then the EP was, it's much more melodic and intricate. That may sound like a contradiction but that is the case. I think we had more to say as musicians this time in the studio as well. Our objective was to keep the aggression and not to loose our edge. I think we captured that quite well, at the same time setting free our artistic side. It's pretty weird. You have to listen to both to really understand."

=== Day into Night and Passage in Time (1999–2001) ===
After signing with Hypnotic Records in 1999, Quo Vadis received $20,000 to record their second album. Recorded at Victor Studios and produced by Quo Vadis and Rémillard, Day into Night was released on March 30, 2000, in Canada. Whereas Forever was credited to all members, Itman wrote most of the songs on Day Into Night. Due to logistical problems, the album was released in Europe in December. To promote the album, a video for "Dysgenics" was made. Beauchamp commented on the making of the video, "It was long! We did two days of shooting. It's not the most pleasant thing to do lipsing and pretend to be playing, but it's all worth it in the end. What's really fun is the editing, seeing the whole thing take shape. We did a video release in Music Plus studios in December, but what people saw that day wasn't the finished version. We changed it a lot since and it looks really cool." Day into Night sold better than Forever. Frydrychowicz compared the albums, "The reactions have been excellent, to give you an idea, we sold as many copies of the new album in the 6 months as of Forever... in 2 years."

The sound was different than Forever, without female vocals or violins. The band shifted away from melody towards technicality and progressiveness, featuring complex song structures and time signature changes. Beauchamp elaborated, "Basically, it was over three years between the recordings of both albums so within that time, the music we listen to has changed. Also, we all improved on our instruments... The female vocals are just something we tried a long time ago. The song was actually written in 1994, and then every band started doing it so we decided to drop it. The violin is not out definitely though, we might be putting some on our next album but for 'Day Into Night', we wanted to have a good heavy album, no extras." Frydrychowicz said that "the production is much better; we spent 3 months in the studio as opposed to a week and a half... Our budget helped as well – we basically spent ten times the amount that we spent on Forever..." He also said, "One thing that many fans asked about... was why there was no violin. At the time we wanted to distance ourselves from all the bands that filled space in their music with different instruments as opposed to writing good music that stood on its own. We did the violin thing five years ago when the idea was a new concept so we wanted to move in. In face, we did record a violin piece for the album but chose not to include it for the reason above. Too many bands with violins. We wanted Day into Night to be heavy and kick ass and not diluted by association."

In 2001, Quo Vadis released compilation album Passage in Time on Skyscraper Music. The album featured the Quo Vadis Demo, two live tracks, two remixes, one new song, and the "Dysgenics" video. Beauchamp commented on the album, "The demo hasn't been available for over three years and many fans were asking for it so we decided we might as well do something special if we were to re-release it. There will be a whole multimedia-section with it too. It will be an interesting package."

=== Line-up changes (2002–2003) ===
In 2002, Yanic Bercier relocated to Tennessee, United States but remained in the band, although not attending a single practice after August 2002. Frydrychowicz asserted, "Yanic is one of the most solid and reliable people I've ever known... We are in touch multiple times a day and he participates in the band... Our rehearsals are at the live shows we play... Yanic makes great efforts to stay in touch, practice, to fly in for all the shows, mixing, mastering, etc."

That year, vocalist and guitarist Itman as well as bassist Beauchamp quit. According to Frydrychowicz, several factors influence the decision; "I had wanted to bring in someone into the band for vocals all the way back in 2001, this was not possible at the time as some ex-members of the band felt that it would diminish their importance or feel threatened." He added, "...you see, back in 2002, we weren't expecting all this to happen a month before recording – and to have to write the other half of the album in 4 weeks... if there had been no changes at all, we would have had to deal with similar issues anyway. That's because, little did we know at the time, the other guitarist had only one song ready a month before studio (despite telling us he had material for four songs) so either way we would have had four weeks to write the rest of the album. Maybe he chose to deal with it by leaving the band, I don't know and I don't really care."

Quo Vadis recruited Cryptopsy guitarist Alex Auburn for the remainder of 2002. Will Seghers saw their first show after the line-up changes, at the Metropolis. After a year, he joined the band temporarily to replace Auburn, who left due to his commitments with Cryptopsy.

In 2003, Frydrychowicz emailed Steve Di Giorgio asking, "Would you be interested in doing session work in Canada?" Di Giorgio agreed and Frydrychowicz sent him info on the band and their music. After Di Giorgio finished touring with Testament, he met Frydrychowicz at the Montreal Airport.

Singer Stéphane Paré replaced Itman. Frydrychowicz praised his vocals, saying, "In any case, the most important issue was to fix the weak delivery of vocals live. And that's been addressed when Stéphane came in." Roxanne Constantin, formerly of Negativa, joined on keyboards, soprano, and alto vocals.

=== Defiant Imagination (2004) ===
Although released on November 4, 2004, Defiant Imagination was written earlier. By 2002, the song structures were finalized and the drums recorded in September 2002, and the bass in August 2003 at Wildsound Studios with Pierre Rémillard as sound engineer. Cellos were recorded in October 2003 by POJPOWJ. The guitars were recorded sporadically between September 2002 and January 2004 and the choir and the vocals were recorded in January 2004. By May 2004, the entire album had been mixed by Jim Morris and mastered by Bernard Belley between June and September 2004.

Because the drums were recorded prior to the guitars, Frydrychowicz had to write his guitar riffs so that they would complement the drums and not vice versa. Frydrychowicz elaborated, "Following the September sessions I went back to work out the harmonies and write a whole new set of guitars trying to see them from a different point of view. The main challenge was to stay within the parameters of the drums – either that or we would have to re-record them again. So I had to be very creative to make the songs interesting without introducing new sections or tempo changes. This is why there are so many harmonies and counter melodies. It was challenging – often I would just jam to the recorded tracks for a long time trying to find a different vibe then that already recorded... this is best apparent on To the Bitter End or Tunnel Effect. If you listen to both guitars, they're doing widely different things yet compliment [sic] each other really well."

The title of the album was initially "To the Bitter End" as the band intended to "record, or mix, or master until we're 100% happy and NOT settle for compromises". Frydrychowicz explained that the artwork did not fit with the title so the band thought of a newer title and decided upon Defiant Imagination.

=== Defiant Indoctrination, Live in Montreal (2005–2007) ===
In 2005, Defiant Indoctrination, a triple DVD documenting a concert in Montreal on May 7, 2005, was released. Produced by Frydrychowicz and Roxy, the first two DVDs featured the concert, in which Defiant Imagination was performed in its entirety along with various other tracks from previous albums, and the third DVD contained drum footage of the entire show, focusing entirely on Yanic Bercier. The mix was handled by Jean-Francois Dagenais (Kataklysm, Misery Index) and Bart. Several guest musicians were featured on the DVD including the famous Quebec cellist Claude Lamothe, Alex Auburn of Cryptopsy fame, bassist Dominic "Forest" Lapointe of Augury/Atheretic/Negativa, and a classical choir and violinist.

In early 2006, William Seghers left the band in order to concentrate on Neuraxis and local progressive metal guitarist Marc-André Gingras of the MAG project was brought in to replace him. In summer 2006, Bart built his own home studio, 40 West Studio, and began working as a producer there with Roxanne as the studio technician. In November 2006, the official Quo Vadis forum was launched. In January 2007, Quo Vadis, along with Kataklysm, toured both Western Europe and Eastern Europe for the first time.

On May 12, 2007, Quo Vadis released Live in Montreal, a live album containing the audio of the 2005 DVD Defiant Indoctrination. In November 2007, Bart released a guitar and bass tabulature book for Defiant Imagination and was sponsored by German amp manufacturer, ENGL.

=== Line-up changes ===
On September 6, 2008, Quo Vadis played a concert at The Medley in Montreal, at which Stéphane Paré confirmed that Yanic and him would be leaving the band, leaving Bart as the only original member still left in the band. Bart speculated that the distance between the band and Yanic contributed to his departure; "With regard to Yanic, I know it was a very difficult decision to make on his part. People change, priorities change, personal situations change and he's been flying in from Tennessee for all the shows so you can imagine with the recent developments in the US/gas prices/travel and the fact that we were working remotely on the new record had probably something to do with it. I guess sometimes you have to make difficult decisions and this one was Yanic's. For sure on my end I will miss him on stage and working with him because he's been like a brother to me for 15 years and we've been through so much together." At the same show, Bart's right knee, which had both ligaments torn away in a sports injury, gave in completely and he supported his entire weight on his left knee for the rest of the show. However, this was to no avail as eventually Rob "The Witch" from Necronomicon and Stephane from BCI had to carry Bart around for the rest of the set, eventually having him sit up on a chair for the remainder of the show. Stéphane proposed cutting the show short but Bart refused and played on till the end. In the following months, both his knees had to have surgery.

After the September 6 show, with Stéphane, Yanic and Forest now gone and Bart unable to walk, rumors began to surface on the internet about Quo Vadis being disbanded entirely. However, on September 15 Bart posted a video on YouTube confirming the departures and dismissing the rumors about the break-up, adding that "a new line-up is in place and we actually have some shows scheduled in October and November... I have been sitting on literally two albums worth of material for the past two years that we were not able to finish for various reasons."

This changed line-up consisted of Patrice Hamelin (of Martyr) as drummer, Trevor Birnie (of Damascus & Annex Theory) as vocalist and Roxanne Constantin (of Negativa) as bassist and keyboardist. A rough mix of a new track, "Equilibrium", was released on the band's Myspace page on October 25, 2008. In late 2009, Trevor Birnie left the band's line-up and was replaced with Matthew Sweeney in early 2010 on vocals.

== Musical style and influences ==
The band was heavily inspired by Metallica and Megadeth, since they started out by covering them, as well as Carcass, Death, hard rock, classical music, thrash metal. The Quo Vadis Demo and Forever... featured violin interludes and female operatic vocals, but by the band abandoned these for Day into Night as both those things had become prevalent in metal music, according to the band members. Day into Night was more aggressive and technical than the band's previous offerings, partially due to improved musicianship. Also, guitarist and vocalist Arie was taking guitar lessons from Alex Skolnick of Testament and as a result, he played a few solos on Day into Night and added a Testament influence to the band. One of Bart's biggest influences is Chuck Schuldiner, and Gene Hoglan's playing on Individual Thought Patterns and Sean Reinert's playing on Human are two of Yanic's biggest influences. The album Defiant Imagination features two songs written about Chuck which are also dedicated to him. For bass duties on Defiant Imagination, Bart had contacted Steve Di Giorgio who had played on Death's Individual Thought Patterns.

== Band members ==
Quo Vadis line-ups
(1992–1994)	Arie Itman – vocals, guitar; Bart Frydrychowicz – vocals, guitar; Yanic Bercier – drums
(1995–2002) Quo Vadis (Demo) Forever... Day into Night Passage in Time	Arie Itman – vocals, guitar; Bart Frydrychowicz – guitar; Remy Beauchamp – bass; Yanic Bercier – drums
(2003)	Stéphane Paré – vocals; Bart Frydrychowicz – guitar; William Seghers – guitar; Steve Di Giorgio – bass; Yanic Bercier – drums
(2004–2008) Defiant Imagination Defiant Indoctrination Live in Montreal	Stéphane Paré – vocals; Bart Frydrychowicz – guitar; William Seghers – guitar; Dominique "Forest" Lapointe – bass; Yanic Bercier – drums
(2008–2009)	Trevor Birnie – vocals; Bart Frydrychowicz – guitars; Marc-André Gringas – guitars; Roxanne Constantin – bass, keyboards; Patrice Hamelin – drums
(2010–2011) But Who Prays for Satan?	Matthew Sweeney – vocals; Bart Frydrychowicz – guitars; Marc-André Gringas – guitars; Roxanne Constantin – bass, keyboards; Patrice Hamelin – drums

=== Final line-up ===
- Matthew Sweeney – vocals (2010–2011)
- Bart Frydrychowicz – guitar (1992–2011), vocals (1992–2002)
- Marc-André Gingras – guitar (2008–2011)
- Roxanne Constantin – bass (2008–2011), keyboards (2003–2008)
- Patrice Hamelin – drums (2008–2011)

=== Former ===
- Arie Itman – guitar, vocals, violin (1992–2002)
- Yanic Bercier – drums, vocals (1992–2008)
- Remy Beauchamp – bass (1995–2002)
- Stéphane Paré – vocals (2003–2008)
- Trevor Birnie – vocals (2008–2009)
- Daniel Mongrain – guitar

=== Session and guests ===
- Alex Auburn – guitar (2002, 2005)
- Steve Di Giorgio – bass (2003)
- Dominic "Forest" Lapointe – bass (2004–2008)
- Sebrina Lipari – vocals
- William Seghers – guitar (2003–2008)

== Discography ==
- Quo Vadis Demo (1995)
- Forever... (1996)
- Day into Night (2000)
- Passage in Time (2001)
- Defiant Imagination (2004)
- Defiant Indoctrination (2005, DVD)
- Live in Montreal (2007)
