= Oli Beaudoin =

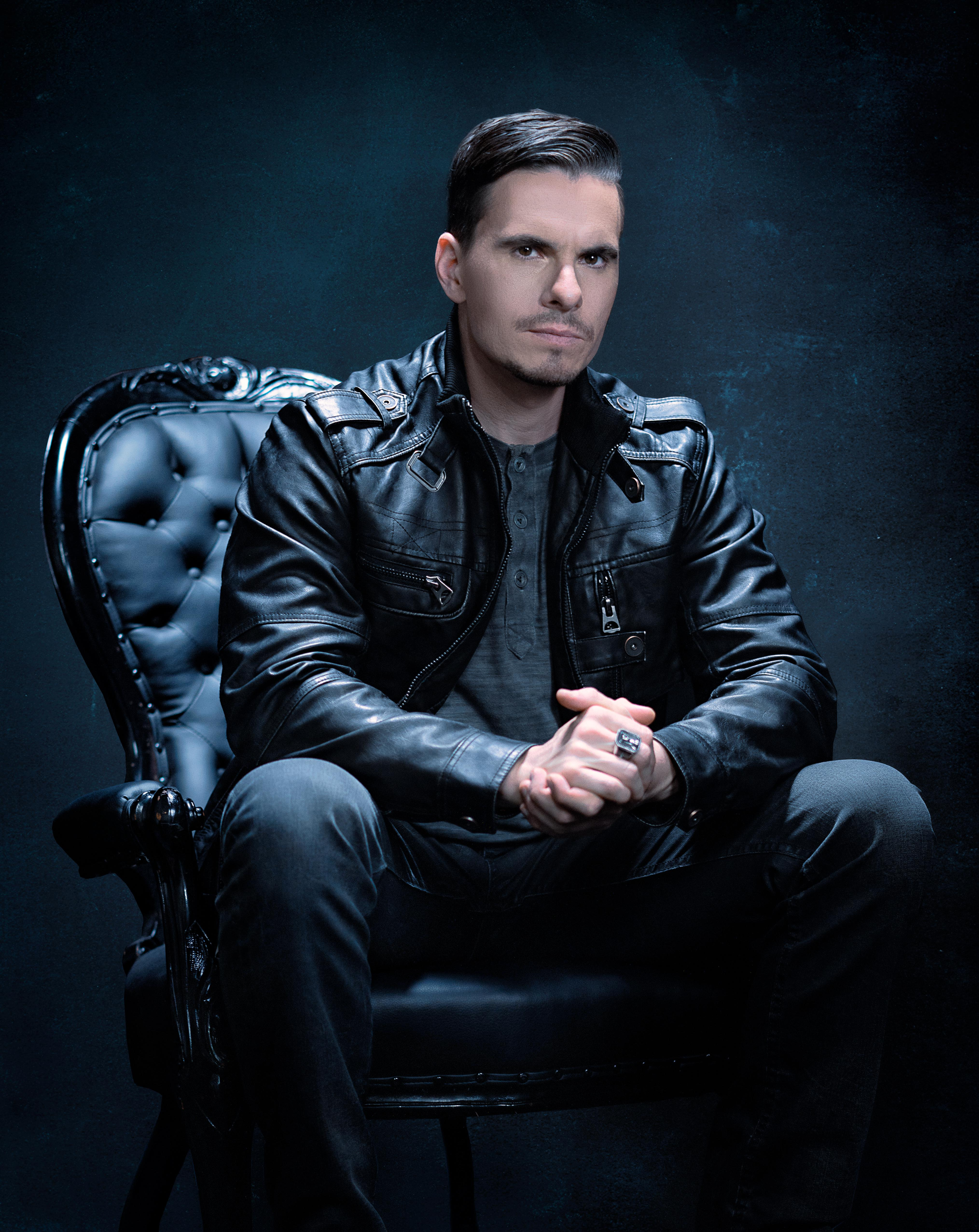
- Drummer, Producer, and Mixer at Pirate Studios Quebec

Background information
- Born: June 29, 1984 (age 42)
- Genres: Rock, Metal, Death metal, technical death metal, melodic death metal
- Occupations: Musician, drummer, producer, mixer
- Instruments: Drums, Bass guitar, Guitar
- Years active: 2000–present

Oli Beaudoin is a Canadian drummer, record producer, composer and mixer. He has won a Juno Award.

He is the former drummer for Kataklysm, Ex Deo, Neuraxis, and live drummer for Belphegor and Keep of Kalessin. Oli currently works as a producer and mixer out of his own studio, Pirate Studios Quebec. Oli is also a drum clinician and instructor, previously performing at the Montreal Drum Fest 2011. Beaudoin has been featured by several drumming magazines, including Drums Etc, Revolver, and Drumheads.

Oli is endorsed by Pearl Drums, Paiste cymbals, Vic Firth sticks, Evans Drumheads, Puresound Snare Wires, Sennheiser microphones, Humes & Berg drum cases, Roland V-Drums, Neural DSP plugins, GASP & Better Bodies clothing, 64 Audio in-ear monitors, Czarcie Kopyto drum pedals, SlapKlatz Gel Dampers, Native Instruments, Plugin Alliance, iZotope, Steinberg, Sonitus Acoustics kick dampers, Kelly SHU, Eventide, Soundtheory, and Sonible.

== Discography ==
- Oli Beaudoin - Redline to Mars (single) – 2026 – Cd Baby Music
- Alex Henry Foster – City On Fire (Live in Veruno) (2026) – Hopeful Tragedy Records
- Alex Henry Foster – From the City to the Ocean (Live in Bocholt) (2026) – Hopeful Tragedy Records
- MetalX – I Am The One – 2025 – Independent
- All Is Ashes – Systems Of Slavery – 2024 – Independent
- Exhorted – Sad Fiction – 2024 – Independent
- MetalX – Crossworld – 2022 – Independent
- Exhorted – Old Bastards Never Die (2021) – Independent
- All Is Ashes – 2021 – What Comes Next – Independent
- Kataklysm - "And Then I Saw Blood" Paiste Factory Instrumental Playthrough (2020)
- Kataklysm – Unconquered (2020) – Nuclear Blast Records
- Ex Deo – The Philosopher King - Single (2020) – Napalm Records
- Eyexist - Celebrated Chaos (2020) – Independent
- 100 Remords – Le Feu en Moi (2019) – Independent
- Kataklysm – A Moment In Time Live DVD (2018) – Nuclear Blast Records
- Kataklysm – Meditations (2018) – Nuclear Blast Records
- Ex Deo – The Immortal Wars (2017) – Napalm Records
- Eyexist - The Digital Holocaust (2016) - PRC Music
- 100 Remords – Blessures (2016) – Independent
- Conceived By Hate – Summoning The Graves (single) (2016) – Deathgasm Records
- Kataklysm – Of Ghosts and Gods (2015) – Nuclear Blast Records
- Kataklysm – Waiting for the End to Come (2013) – Nuclear Blast Records
- Neuraxis – Asylon (2011) – Prosthetic Records
- Stareblind – Something Left Unexplained (2009) – Independent

== Live ==
- Alex Henry Foster (2025-to now)
- Ex Deo (2012)-to (2020).
- Kataklysm (2012)-to (2020).
- Keep of Kalessin (2011) Mayhem North American Headlining tour
- Montreal Drum Festival (2011) Drum clinician/performance
- Belphegor (2011) South American Headlining tour
- Neuraxis (2011) Sepultura North American Headlining tour
- Neuraxis (2011) Deicide North American Headlining tour
- OVIF (2009–2011)

== Producer credits ==
- P (Produced)
- E (Engineered)
- M (Mix)
- MA (Mastered)
- A (Arranged)
- D (Drummer)
- B (Bass)
- P (Produced)

Redline to Mars (single) – Starship Flight 12 Cinematic Edit Soundtrack – 2026 – C-P-E-M-MA-A

Alex Henry Foster – City On Fire (Live in Veruno) – D

Alex Henry Foster – From the City to the Ocean (Live in Bocholt) – D

MetalX – I Am The One – 2025 – P-E-M-MA-D

All Is Ashes – Systems Of Slavery – 2024 – P-E-M-MA-D

Exhorted – Sad Fiction – 2024 – P-E-M-MA-D

MetalX – Crossworld – 2022 – P-E-M-MA-A-D

All Is Ashes – 2021 – What Comes Next – P-E-M-MA-A-D-B

Exhorted – Old Bastards Never Die (2021) – P-M-MA

Kataklysm - "And Then I Saw Blood" Paiste Factory Drum Playthrough (2020) – M - MA - D

Kataklysm – Unconquered (2020) – E-D

Ex Deo – The Philosopher King (2020) – Napalm Records - E-D

Eyexist – Celebrated Chaos (2020) – Independent - P-E-M-MA-A-D-B

100 Remords – Le Feu en Moi (2019) – Independent – E-M-MA

Kataklysm – Meditations (2018) – P-E-A-D

Kataklysm – A Moment In Time Live DVD (2018) – E (Digital Editing)-D

Ex Deo – The Immortal Wars (2016) – Napalm Records - E-A-D

Eyexist – The Digital Holocaust (2016) – PRC MUSIC - P-E-M-MA-A-D-B

100 Remords – Blessures (2016) – Independent – P-E-M-MA-A

Conceived By Hate – Summoning The Graves (single) (2016) – Deathgasm Records – M-MA

Kataklysm – Of Ghosts and Gods (2015) – Nuclear Blast Records - E-A-D

Kataklysm – Waiting for the End to Come (2013) – Nuclear Blast Records - E-A-D

Neuraxis – Asylon (2011) – Prosthetic Records – A-D

Stareblind – Something Left Unexplained (2009) – A-D
