= Independent Music Awards =

Independent Music Awards may refer to:

- AIM Independent Music Awards
- Canadian Independent Music Awards
- AIR Independent Music Awards
- PLUG Independent Music Awards
