= Trilateral Progression =

Studio album by Neuraxis
- Released: September 13, 2005
- Recorded: May 2005 at Victor Studio (drums) and TNT Studio (guitar, bass and vocals)
- Genre: Melodic death metal, technical death metal
- Length: 35:11
- Label: Willowtip
- Producer: Neuraxis

Neuraxis chronology
Truth Beyond... (2002)	Trilateral Progression (2005)	Live Progression (2007)

Professional ratings
Review scores
Source	Rating
Allmusic	4.5/5 stars
Bravewords	8/10
Exclaim!	favorable
Metalreview.com	9/10 stars
Rock Hard	8/10
RocknWorld	9.2/10
Teufel's Tomb	Excellent

Trilateral Progression is the fourth studio album by Canadian death metal band Neuraxis. It was released on September 13, 2005, by Earache Records in the United Kingdom, and by Willowtip Records in North America.

== Track listing ==
All lyrics are written by Ian Campbell.

No.	Title	Music	Length
1.	"Introspect"	Guillaume Audet	4:38
2.	"Clarity"	Rob Milley	3:30
3.	"Thought Adjuster"	Steven Henry	5:16
4.	"Shatter the Wisdom"	Milley	4:28
5.	"Monitoring the Mind"	Milley	3:43
6.	"A Curative Struggle"	Henry	3:42
7.	"Chamber of Guardians"	Henry	4:26
8.	"Caricature"	Henry, Milley	5:12
9.	"Axioms"	Milley, Tommy McKinnon, Henry	1:52
10.	"The Apex"	Milley	5:59
Total length:			35:11

== Personnel ==
=== Neuraxis ===
- Ian Campbell – vocals
- Steven Henry – guitar
- Robin Milley – guitar, 12-string acoustic guitar
- Yan Thiel – bass
- Tommy McKinnon – drums

=== Additional musicians ===
- Guillaume Audet – music on "Introspect", intro and outro on "The Apex"
- Patrick Loisel – backing vocals on "Thought Adjuster"
- Jason Netherton – backing vocals on "Thought Adjuster", "Shatter the Wisdom", "Caricature"
- Maynard Moore – backing vocals on "Thought Adjuster", "Caricature"
- Alexandre Erian – backing vocals on "Shatter the Wisdom", "Monitoring the Mind", "Caricature", "The Apex"

=== Production ===
- Jason Suecof – mixing
- Scott Hull – mastering
- Yannick St-Amand – engineering
- Tony Fortin – assistant engineering
- Carlos "C Man" – assistant engineering

=== Additional personnel ===
- Sam Dufour – lyric revision
- Robin Milley – lyric revision
- Mike Harrison – artwork
- Mark Riddick – graphic execution
- Gab.357 – logo design
- Melany Champagne – band photo
