= Day into Night =

Day Into Night

Studio album by Quo Vadis
- Released: March 30, 2000
- Recorded: June 30th to September 17th 1999 at Victor Studios, Montreal, Canada
- Genres: Melodic death metal, technical death metal
- Length: 52:21
- Label: Hypnotic Records
- Producers: Quo Vadis, Pierre Remillard

Quo Vadis chronology
| Forever... (1996) | Day Into Night (2000) | Passage in Time (2001) |

Day Into Night is the second full-length album by the Canadian melodic death metal band Quo Vadis. It was released on March 30, 2000. The album was accompanied by a music video for the song "Dysgenics".

== Critical reception ==
Professional ratings
Review scores
| Source | Rating |
|---|---|
| BW&BK | 8/10 stars |
| Metal Storm | 9/10 stars |
| Metal.de | 9/10 stars |
| Rock Hard | 9/10 stars |

Greg Platt for Brave Words & Bloody Knuckles spoke highly of the album, comparing the album's sound to that of Kataklysm and Carcass. He also praised the production, with the "double-bass drums pounding heavy and proud and vocalist Yanic growling, whispering, speaking and screaming nicely over the whole thing." Metal Storm also spoke highly of the album and called Quo Vadis "one of the best bands to come from North America in the last years, and an underrated act also." Metal.de cited the album as being "played at a high technical level and implemented with a transparent production" but criticized the vocals, stating they "lag behind the rest of the instrumentation in terms of quality."

== Track listing ==
| No. | Title | Lyrics | Music | Length |
|---|---|---|---|---|
| 1. | "Absolution (Element of the Ensemble III)" | Yanic Bercier | Arie Itman, Bercier | 5:43 |
| 2. | "Dysgenics" | Itman | Itman | 5:55 |
| 3. | "Hunter/Killer" | Itman | Itman | 5:18 |
| 4. | "Hunter/Killer: Endgame" | Instrumental | Itman | 2:02 |
| 5. | "Let It Burn" | Itman | Itman | 6:21 |
| 6. | "Dream" | Instrumental | Itman | 5:11 |
| 7. | "On the Shores of Ithaka" | Frydrychowicz | Frydrychowicz | 6:51 |
| 8. | "Night of the Roses" | Instrumental | | 0:37 |
| 9. | "I Believe" | Itman | Itman | 5:08 |
| 10. | "Point of No Return : Mute Requiem" | Frydrychowicz | Frydrychowicz | 4:03 |
| 11. | "Point of No Return : Cadences of Absonance" | Frydrychowicz | Frydrychowicz | 5:12 |
| Total length: | | | | 52:21 |

== Personnel ==
=== Quo Vadis ===
- Arie Itman – vocals, guitar, solo on tracks 2, 3, 4, 5, 6, 9
- Bart Frydrychowicz – guitars, solo on tracks 7 and 10
- Remy Beauchamp – bass
- Yanic Bercier – drums, backing vocals

=== Guest musicians ===
- Claude Picard - keyboards
