= A Passage in Time =

A Passage in Time may refer to:

- A Passage in Time (Dead Can Dance album), 1991
- A Passage in Time (Authority Zero album), 2002
- Passage in Time, an album by Quo Vadis, 2001
- The Passage of Time (日光流年, Rìguāng liúnián), a book by Yan Lianke, 1998
