= Temple of Knowledge =

Studio album by Kataklysm
- Released: June 26, 1996
- Recorded: December 1995 – January 1996
- Studio: Morin-Heights Studios
- Genre: Death metal
- Length: 39:32
- Language: English, French
- Label: Nuclear Blast
- Producer: Jean-François Dagenais

Kataklysm chronology
Sorcery (1995)	Temple of Knowledge (1996)	Victims of This Fallen World (1998)

Professional ratings
Review scores
Source	Rating
Chronicles of Chaos	9/10

Temple of Knowledge (Kataklysm Part III) is the second full-length by Kataklysm released in 1996 by Nuclear Blast. Each of the tracks on the original 9-song disc was part of a "trilogy/trinity"; thus, tracks 1–3 were "The Transenflamed Memories (Trinity)", tracks 4–6 were "Through The Core Of The Damned (Trinity)" and track 7–9 were known as "Era Of The Aquarius (Trinity)". It was re-issued in 2003 as a digipak and included their demo The Vortex of Resurrection.

== Track listing ==
No.	Title	Length
1.	"The Unholy Signature (Segment I: Utterly Significant)"	6:19
2.	"Beckoning of the Xul (Segment II: In the Midst of the Azonei's Dominion)"	5:53
3.	"Point of Evanescence (Segment III: Of Sheer Perseverance)"	3:41
4.	"Fathers from the Suns (Act I: The Occurred Barrier)"	4:23
5.	"Enhanced by the Lore (Act II: Scholarship Ordained)"	3:41
6.	"In Parallel Horizons (Act III: Spontaneous Aura Projection)"	4:01
7.	"The Awakener (Epoch I: Summon the Legends)"	4:06
8.	"Maelstrom 2010 (Epoch II: Omens About the Great Infernos)"	3:20
9.	"Exode of Evils (Epoch III: Ladder of Thousand Parsecs)"	4:06
Total length:		39:32

2003 Digipak Edition
No.	Title	Length
10.	"L'Odyssée..."	3:15
11.	"Mould in a Breed" (original uncut version)	6:03
12.	"Whirlwind of Withered Blossoms" (Demo version)	5:15
13.	"Feeling the Netherworld" (Demo version)	5:58
14.	"The Orb" (original uncut version)	2:32

== Kataklysm ==
- Sylvain Houde – vocals
- Jean-François Dagenais – guitar
- Maurizio Iacono – bass, backing vocals
- Nick Miller – drums

== Production ==
- Produced and mixed by Jean-Francois Dagenais
- Recorded by Glen Robinson and Jocelyn Daoust; assisted by Don Hackey
