= Defiant Imagination =

Studio album by Quo Vadis
- Released: November 4, 2004
- Recorded: September 2002 – March 2004 at Wildsound Studio and BR Studios
- Genres: Melodic death metal; technical death metal
- Length: 39:18
- Label: Skyscraper Music
- Producers: Bart Frydrychowicz; Yanic Bercier; Bernard Belley

Quo Vadis chronology
Passage in Time (2001)	Defiant Imagination (2004)	Defiant Indoctrination (2005)

Professional ratings
Review scores
Source	Rating
Sputnikmusic	4/5
BW&BK	8.5/10 stars
Metal Storm	8.7/10 stars

Defiant Imagination is the third and final full-length studio album by the Canadian melodic death metal band Quo Vadis. It was released on November 4, 2004 by Skyscraper Music.

== Track listing ==
All music is composed by Bart Frydrychowicz, except for "Tunnel Effect (Element of the Ensemble IV)" by Frydrychowicz and Yanic Bercier.

No.	Title	Lyrics	Length
1.	"Silence Calls the Storm"	Bercier	5:03
2.	"In Contempt"	Frydrychowicz	3:35
3.	"Break the Cycle"	Frydrychowicz	6:05
4.	"Tunnel Effect (Element of the Ensemble IV)"	Bercier	5:39
5.	"To the Bitter End"	Frydrychowicz	6:59
6.	"In Articulo Mortis"	Frydrychowicz	1:07
7.	"Fate's Descent"	Bercier	4:35
8.	"Dead Man's Diary"	Bercier	5:25
9.	"Ego Intuo et Servo te"	Frydrychowicz	0:51
Total length:			39:19

== Personnel ==
Quo Vadis

- Bart Frydrychowicz – lead and rhythm guitars
- Yanic Bercier – drums, backing vocals
- Stéphane Paré – vocals

Guest musicians

- Steve Di Giorgio – bass
- William Seghers – lead guitar
- Roxanne Constantin – keyboard, soprano, alto
- Elizabeth Giroux – cello

Quo Vadis Choir

- Roxanne Constantin
- Bart Frydrychowicz
- Marco Calliari
- Sophie Martin
- Arianne Fleury
- Marc Vaillancourt
- Oscar Souto
- Julie Bélanger Roy
- Mathieu Groulx
- Carlos Lopez

Guest vocals

- Marco Calliari – guest vocals in "Tunnel Effect"
- Oscar Souto – guest vocals in "Tunnel Effect"
- Ian Campbell – guest vocals in "To the Bitter End"
- Alexandre Erian – guest vocals in "To the Bitter End"
- Armen – guest vocals in "To the Bitter End"
