= Imagery (album) =

Studio album by Neuraxis
- Released: February 6, 1997
- Recorded: May 1996 at Peter Pan Studios
- Genre: Melodic death metal, technical death metal
- Length: 30:02
- Label: Neoblast
- Producer: Neuraxis

Neuraxis chronology
Imagery (1997)	A Passage into Forlorn (2001)

Imagery is the debut studio album by Canadian death metal band Neuraxis. It was released in 1997, through the band's own record label, Neoblast Records.

== Track listing ==
No.	Title	Lyrics	Music	Length
1.	"Intro" (instrumental)		Henry	0:17
2.	"A Temporal Calamity"	Moore	Henry	3:28
3.	"Oscillated to Intelligence"	Moore	Henry	3:10
4.	"Cyberwar"	Henry, Moore	Henry	1:58
5.	"Inquisition on Mortality"	Moore	Henry	3:02
6.	"Lid to Your Soul"	Moore	Henry, Thiel	3:46
7.	"Reasons of Being"	Moore	Henry, Thiel	3:17
8.	"Atmospheric Holocaust" (instrumental)		Henry	1:59
9.	"Psycho - Waves"	Henry, Moore	Henry, Thiel	4:14
10.	"A Drift..." (instrumental)		Henry	0:44
11.	"Driftwood"	Moore	Henry, Thiel	3:20
12.	"The Drop"	Moore	Henry	0:47
Total length:				30:02

== Personnel ==
=== Neuraxis ===
- Maynard Moore – vocals
- Steven Henry – guitars, backing vocals, artwork
- Felipe Quinzanos – guitars
- Yan Thiel – bass
- Mathieu Royale – drums

=== Production ===
- J-F Dagenais – sound engineering
