= Forever... (Quo Vadis album) =

Studio album by Quo Vadis
- Released: April 10, 1996
- Recorded: 1996 at Studio Peter Pan and Gilles Peltier Studio
- Genres: Melodic death metal, technical death metal
- Length: 38:54
- Label: VomiT Productions
- Producers: Quo Vadis, Pierre Remillard, Robert Grimand

Quo Vadis chronology
Forever... (1996)	Day Into Night (2000)

Professional ratings
Review scores
Source	Rating
Metal Crypt	4.25/5
Sputnikmusic	3.7/5

Forever... is the debut full-length studio album by the Canadian melodic death metal band Quo Vadis. It was released on April 10, 1996. The last track is taken from the Quo Vadis Demo.

== Track listing ==
All music written by Quo Vadis.

No.	Title	Lyrics	Music	Length
1.	"Legions of the Betrayed"	Frydrychowicz	Quo Vadis	6:16
2.	"As I Feed the Flames of Hate"	Frydrychowicz	Quo Vadis	6:06
3.	"Carpae Deum"	Frydrychowicz	Quo Vadis	3:11
4.	"Mystery"	Bercier	Quo Vadis	0:57
5.	"Inner Capsule (Element of the Ensemble Part II)"	Bercier	Quo Vadis	3:57
6.	"Pantheon of Tears"	Frydrychowicz	Quo Vadis	3:50
7.	"Zero Hour"	Itman	Quo Vadis	3:15
8.	"The Day the Universe Changed"	Instrumental	Quo Vadis	5:29
9.	"Nocturnal Reflections"	Itman	Quo Vadis	1:20
10.	"Sans Abris"	Frydrychowicz	Quo Vadis	4:31
Total length:				38:54

== Personnel ==
Quo Vadis

- Arie Itman – guitars, vocals, violin, solo on tracks 1, 7, 8
- Bart Frydrychowicz – guitars, vocals, acoustic guitar, solo on tracks 1, 2, 6
- Remy Beauchamp – bass
- Yanic Bercier – drums, backing vocals

Guest musicians

- Corelli - violin on Carpe Deum
- Stepehen Henry - scream on "Legions of the Betrayed"
- Sebrina Lipari - soprano on track 10
