= Truth Beyond... =

Studio album by Neuraxis
- Released: November 1, 2002
- Recorded: March – August 2002 at Studio Zsound
- Genre: Melodic death metal, technical death metal
- Length: 41:07
- Label: Neoblast, Galy
- Producer: Neuraxis

Neuraxis chronology
A Passage into Forlorn (2001)	Truth Beyond... (2002)	Trilateral Progression (2005)

Professional ratings
Review scores
Source	Rating
Allmusic	4/5 stars
Metal.de	8/10
Rock Hard	7/10

Truth Beyond... is the third album by Canadian death metal band Neuraxis. It was released on November 1, 2002, by Canadian music labels Neoblast and Galy Records. It was re-released through Morbid Records in 2003.

== Track listing ==
No.	Title	Lyrics	Music	Length
1.	"...Of Divinity"	Campbell	Milley, Henry	3:41
2.	"Impulse"	Campbell	Henry, Milley	4:15
3.	"Fractionized"	Campbell	Henry	4:38
4.	"Xenobiotic"	Campbell	Milley, Henry	2:57
5.	"Reflections"	Campbell	Henry, Thiel	4:23
6.	"Imagery"	Henry, Alsop	Henry	3:47
7.	"Momento"	instrumental	Milley	1:32
8.	"Structures"	Campbell	Henry, Milley	3:31
9.	"Mutiny"	Campbell	Henry, Milley	3:58
10.	"Essence"	Campbell	Milley	5:29
11.	"Neurasthenic"	Campbell	Henry, Erian	0:38
12.	"Truth Beyond Recognition..."	Henry	Henry	3:49
Total length:				41:07

== Personnel ==
=== Neuraxis ===
- Ian Campbell – vocals
- Steven Henry – guitars
- Robin Milley – guitars, 12 string acoustic guitar
- Yan Thiel – bass
- Alexandre Erian – drums

=== Additional musicians ===
- Lenzig Leal – backing vocals on "Impulse", "Fractionized", "Xenobiotic", "Neurasthenic"
- Zac Joe – backing vocals on "Impulse", "Essence", "Neurasthenic"
- Jawsh Mullen – backing vocals on "Impulse", "Neurasthenic"
- Steve Marois – backing vocals on "Impulse", "Fractionized"
- Youri – backing vocals on "Impulse", "Structures"

=== Production ===
- Yannick St-Amand – mixing, mastering, sound engineering
- Bernard Belley – mastering

=== Additional personnel ===
- Mike Harrison – artwork
- Pat Loisel – lyrics revision
- Robin Milley – lyrics revision
- Steven Henry – cover concept, computer layout
- Louis-Charles Levasseur – photography
- Melissa Malboeuf – photography
