= The Thin Line Between =

Studio album by Neuraxis
- Released: July 15, 2008
- Recorded: February–March 2008 at Badass Studio
- Genre: Technical death metal, melodic death metal
- Length: 47:41
- Label: Prosthetic
- Producer: Jeff Fortin and Neuraxis

Neuraxis chronology
Live Progression (2007)	The Thin Line Between (2008)	Asylon (2011)

Professional ratings
Review scores
Source	Rating
Allmusic	3.5/5 stars
About.com	4/5 stars

The Thin Line Between is the fifth studio album by Canadian death metal band Neuraxis. It was released on July 15, 2008, by Prosthetic Records. The album was the first studio album recorded with guitarist William Seghers and vocalist Alex Leblanc, who replaced Steven Henry and Ian Campbell respectively. In April 2009, the band released a music video for "Darkness Prevails". Neuraxis uploaded three videos of the recording sessions on their official YouTube channel.

Bassist Yan Theil and drummer Tommy Mckinnon left some time after the release of the album. The departure of Theil left Neuraxis with no remaining founding members. Robin Milley is now the longest-serving member of the band.

== Track listing ==
No.	Title	Lyrics	Music	Length
1.	"Darkness Prevails"	Leblanc	Milley	4:32
2.	"Wicked"	Mckinnon	Milley, Mckinnon	5:00
3.	"Versus"	Leblanc	Milley	4:34
4.	"Deviation Occurs"	Leblanc	Seghers	5:05
5.	"The Thin Line Between"	Leblanc	Milley	8:32
6.	"Dreaming the End"	Leblanc	Seghers	4:22
7.	"Standing Despite"	(Instrumental)	Seghers	1:29
8.	"Oracle"	Mckinnon	Seghers	3:52
9.	"Phoenix"	Leblanc	Milley, Mckinnon, Seghers	5:12
10.	"The All and the Nothing"	Mckinnon	Milley	5:07
Total length:				47:41

== Reception ==
Ox-Fanzine called the songs catchy and instantly memorable.

== Personnel ==
=== Neuraxis ===
- Alex Leblanc – vocals
- Robin Milley – guitar
- Will Seghers – guitar
- Yan Theil – bass
- Tommy McKinnon – drums

=== Additional musicians ===
- Luc Lemay – vocals on "The Thin Line Between" and "Oracle"
- Chris Alsop – vocals on "The All and the Nothing"
- Sebastian Croteau – vocals on "Standing Despite..."

=== Production ===
- Jef Fortin – production, mixing, sound engineering
- Alan Douches – mastering

=== Additional personnel ===
- Dennis Sibeijn – artwork, layout
- Fred Laroche – photography
