= Live Progression =

Live album by Neuraxis
- Released: November 6, 2007
- Recorded: April 7, 2007, at L'Imperial, Quebec City, QC, Canada
- Genre: Melodic death metal, technical death metal
- Length: 46:43
- Label: Galy, Willowtip, Earache

Neuraxis chronology
Trilateral Progression (2005)	Live Progression (2007)	The Thin Line Between (2008)

Professional ratings
Review scores
Source	Rating
AllMusic	4/5 stars
About.com	4/5 stars
Blabbermouth.net	(7.5/10)
Exclaim!	favorable
Metal Storm	(8.9/10)

Live Progression is the first live album by Canadian death metal band Neuraxis. It was recorded live at L'Imperial in Quebec City, QC, Canada, on April 7, 2007. It was released on November 6, 2007, by Galy Records and Willowtip Records in North America, and by Earache Records in the UK.

Live Progression was meant to introduce the new line-up to fans, following the departures of founding member and guitarist Steven Henry and long-time vocalist Ian Campbell. It is the first release featuring vocalist Alex Leblanc and guitarist Will Seghers.

== Track listing ==
No.	Title	Lyrics	Music	Length
1.	"The Apex"	Campbell	Milley	4:12
2.	"Fractionized"	Campbell	Henry	5:22
3.	"A Curative Struggle"	Campbell	Henry	3:55
4.	"The Art of Sadness"	Alsop, Campbell	Henry, Milley	4:21
5.	"Thought Adjuster"	Campbell	Henry	5:14
6.	"Monitoring the Mind"	Campbell	Milley	5:08
7.	"Neurasthenic"	Campbell	Henry, Erian	0:40
8.	"Reasons of Being"	Moore	Henry, Thiel	5:08
9.	"Clarity"	Campbell	Milley	3:31
10.	"Shatter the Wisdom"	Campbell	Milley	4:59
11.	"...Of Divinity"	Campbell	Milley, Henry	4:55
Total length:				46:43

== Personnel ==
=== Neuraxis ===
- Alex Leblanc – vocals
- Robin Miley – guitar
- Will Seghers – guitar
- Yan Theil – bass
- Tommy McKinnon – drums

=== Additional personnel ===
- David Gendrom – instrument recording at New Roch Studio
- Jean-Yves Theriault – front of house sound
- J-F Dagenais – mixing at JFD Studio
- Jeff Fortin – mastering at Badass Studio
- Svencho – cover art, layout
- Fred Laroche – photography
- Caroline Traiter – photography
- Yves Gagnon – photography
- Patryk Pigeon – photography
