= Roxanne Constantin =

- Genres: Melodic death metal, technical death metal
- Occupation: Musician
- Instrument(s): Keyboard, bass guitar, vocals

Roxanne Constantin is a Canadian musician who is formerly the member of the bands Quo Vadis, Negativa and Rostrum. She has a B.A. in piano performance from the Montreal Conservatory of Music.

== Biography ==
In December 2007, Roxanne Constantin was added to Negativa as a vocalist. She left Negativa's line-up afterwards.

Roxanne Constantin had been a supporter and assistant of Quo Vadis since 2002 (for instance donating keyboards and vocals previously), but became an official member of the band in 2008. She joined the band as a bassist, along with drummer Patrice Hamlin and vocalist Trevor Birnie.

== Discography ==
=== As a guest musician ===
- Quo Vadis – Defiant Imagination (full-length, 2004)
- Aven Aura – The Shadow of Idols (full-length, 2005)
- The Plasmarifle – While You Were Sleeing the World Changed in an Instant (full-length, 2008)
- Necronomicon – The Return of the Witch (full-length, 2010)
