= Nefastus Dies =

Canadian black/death metal band

- Origin: Montreal, Quebec, Canada
- Genres: Black metal, death metal
- Years active: 2005−present
- Labels: Siege of Amida Records; Candlelight USA
- Members: Seb Painchaud; Frank Lebeau; Fred Desmeules; Tim Sanders; Max Ducharme
- Past members: Guillaume Audet; Tommy Mckinnon
- Website: www.myspace.com/nefastusdies

Nefastus Dies is a Canadian black/death metal band from Montreal, Quebec.

== History ==
The band formed in 2002 and completed its final lineup in 2005. Two months later, they released the promo CD Prelude. They embarked on a promotional tour to support the recording in January 2006. In March 2006, they entered Yannick St-Amand's studio to record their first full-length album. They signed with an underground label but realised that this label did not have the resources to promote this album.

In 2008, they released their first and only album, Urban Cancer. Allmusic rated it 2.5 stars.

In early 2009, the band released the two-song promo EP Interlude exclusively over the internet. Shortly after this, singer and main composer Seb Painchaud left the band.

== Band members ==
=== Current ===
- Fred Desmeules − guitar (2003−present)
- Frank lebeau − guitar (2003−present)
- Tim Sanders − bass guitar (2008−present)
- Max Ducharme − drums (2005−present)

=== Former ===
- Christian Gauthier - vocals, guitar (2000–2007)
- Seb Painchaud − vocals (2005−2009)
- Guillaume Audet − keyboards (2003−2007)
- Tommy Mckinnon − drums (2003−2005)

== Discography ==
=== Studio albums ===
- Urban Cancer (2008)

=== Miscellaneous ===
- Prelude (2005, promo)
- Interlude (2009, promo)
