= The Prophecy (Stigmata of the Immaculate) =

Studio album by Kataklysm
- Released: April 17, 2000
- Genre: Death metal
- Length: 40:00
- Label: Nuclear Blast
- Producer: Jean-François Dagenais

Kataklysm chronology
Victims of this Fallen World (1998)	The Prophecy (Stigmata of the Immaculate) (2000)	Epic: The Poetry of War (2001)

The Prophecy (Stigmata of the Immaculate) is the fourth studio album by the Canadian death metal band Kataklysm.

== Track listing ==
No.	Title	Length
1.	"1999:6661:2000"	3:53
2.	"Manifestation" (featuring Rob "The Witch" Tremblay)	3:57
3.	"Stormland"	3:13
4.	"Breeding the Everlasting"	3:54
5.	"Laments of Fear & Despair" (featuring Mike DiSalvo)	4:13
6.	"Astral Empire"	3:32
7.	"Gateway to Extinction"	5:25
8.	"Machiavellian"	3:44
9.	"The Renaissance"	8:10
Total length:		40:00

== Personnel ==
Kataklysm

- Maurizio Iacono – Vocals
- Jean-François Dagenais – Guitar, record producer
- Stéphane Barbe – Bass
- Max Duhamel – Drums

Guest musicians

- Mike DiSalvo – Guest vocals on "Laments of Fear and Despair"
- Rob "The Witch" Tremblay – Guest vocals "Manifestation"

Production

- Jean-François Dagenais – Producer, Mixing, Engineering
- Sylvain Brisebois – Mastering
- Francis Beaulieu – Engineering Assistant
- Maurizio Iacono – Lyrics
