= Of Ghosts and Gods =

Studio album by Kataklysm
- Released: 31 July 2015
- Genre: Death metal, melodic death metal
- Length: 46:05
- Label: Nuclear Blast

Kataklysm chronology
| Waiting for the End to Come (2013) | Of Ghosts and Gods (2015) | Meditations (2018) |

Of Ghosts and Gods is the twelfth studio album by the Canadian death metal band Kataklysm. It was released on 31 July 2015.

Professional ratings
Review scores
| Source | Rating |
|---|---|
| Exclaim! | 7/10 |
| MetalSucks | 4/5 stars |

== Track listing ==
All tracks are written by Kataklysm.

| No. | Title | Length |
|---|---|---|
| 1. | "Breaching the Asylum" | 4:04 |
| 2. | "The Black Sheep" | 4:32 |
| 3. | "Marching Through Graveyards" | 5:22 |
| 4. | "Thy Serpent's Tongue" | 4:10 |
| 5. | "Vindication" | 3:42 |
| 6. | "Soul Destroyer" | 3:28 |
| 7. | "Carrying Crosses" | 4:31 |
| 8. | "Shattered" | 5:03 |
| 9. | "Hate Spirit" | 4:36 |
| 10. | "The World Is a Dying Insect" | 6:39 |

Live In Cape Town '4 Bonus Tracks
| No. | Title | Length |
|---|---|---|
| 1. | "Fire" | 6:06 |
| 2. | "Push The Venom" | 3:33 |
| 3. | "Elevate" | 4:07 |
| 4. | "Blood In Heaven" | 5:57 |
| Total length: | | 19:43 |

== Credits ==
=== Personnel ===
- Maurizio Iacono - vocals
- Jean-François Dagenais - guitar
- Stephane Barbe - bass guitar
- Oli Beaudoin - drums

=== Production ===
- Andy Sneap - mixing, mastering

== Charts ==
| Chart (2015) | Peak position |
|---|---|
| Austrian Albums (Ö3 Austria) | 37 |
| Belgian Albums (Ultratop Flanders) | 81 |
| Belgian Albums (Ultratop Wallonia) | 86 |
| German Albums (Offizielle Top 100) | 27 |
| Swiss Albums (Schweizer Hitparade) | 31 |

== Notes ==
A music video has been made for every track on the album.
