= Epic: The Poetry of War =

Epic: The Poetry Of War

Studio album by Kataklysm
- Released: September 17, 2001
- Recorded: Victor Studio, February - March 2001
- Genre: Death metal
- Length: 39:35
- Language: English
- Label: Nuclear Blast
- Producer: Jean-François Dagenais

Kataklysm chronology
The Prophecy (Stigmata of the Immaculate) (2000)	Epic: The Poetry Of War (2001)	Shadows & Dust (2002)

Professional ratings
Review scores
Source	Rating
AllMusic	3/5 stars

Epic: The Poetry of War is the fifth studio album by the Canadian death metal band Kataklysm.

== Track listing ==
No.	Title	Length
1.	"Il Diavolo in Me"	3:25
2.	"Damnation Is Here"	4:34
3.	"Era of the Mercyless"	3:31
4.	"As the Glorious Weep"	4:12
5.	"Shivers of a New World"	4:06
6.	"Manipulator of Souls"	3:41
7.	"Wounds"	4:53
8.	"What We Endure"	4:56
9.	"When Time Stands Still"	6:15
Total length:		39:35

Bonus tracks
No.	Title	Length
10.	"Mould in a Breed"	6:03
11.	"Whirlwind of Withered Blossoms"	5:15
12.	"Feeling the Neverworld"	5:58
13.	"The Orb"	2:32
Total length:		59:23

== Personnel ==
Kataklysm

- Maurizio Iacono – vocals
- Stéphane Barbe – Bass
- Jean-François Dagenais – Guitar, record producer
- Max Duhamel – drums

Production

- Jean-François Dagenais - produced, engineered, mixed
- Louis Legault - engineering assistant
- Stéphane Barbe - engineering assistant
- Bernard Belly - mastering
- Maurizio Iacono - lyrics
