= Man Must Die =

Scottish technical death metal band

- Origin: Glasgow, United Kingdom
- Genres: Technical death metal
- Years active: 2002–2024
- Labels: Retribute, Relapse, Lifeforce, Grindscene
- Members: Joe McGlynn; Alan McFarland; James Wright; Michael Allan; Tony Corio
- Past members: John Lee; René Hauffe; David Sandford; Matt Holland; Danny McNab; Todd Hansen; James Burke; Daniel Firth

Man Must Die was a Scottish technical death metal band from Glasgow, formed in 2002.

== History ==
Man Must Die was formed in May 2002, with John Lee, Alan McFarland, Danny McNab and Joe McGlynn. The band members were known throughout the Scottish metal scene through other bands such as Regorge, Confusion Corporation, Co-Exist and Godplayer. They released a four-track demo, The Season Of Evil, in 2003 which attracted label Retribute Records who released their debut album ...Start Killing, in 2004. They released their second studio album through Relapse Records, titled The Human Condition. In 2007, Man Must Die parted ways with John Lee who was replaced by Matt Holland, the former drummer of Inversus, Zillah, Sons Of Slaughter and Madman Is Absolute. And in 2012, Matt Holland was replaced by Australian drummer Todd Hansen, of Canadian band Amplitusion, Australian bands Headkase, Rome, F.U.C., and formerly of The Berzerker.

In 2009 Man Must Die released their third studio album, entitled No Tolerance For Imperfection through Relapse Records. They toured extensively supporting the likes of Machine Head, Hatebreed, Decapitated, Dying Fetus, Suffocation, Cephalic Carnage, Kataklysm, The Rotted and Exodus.

Their 4th studio album, entitled Peace Was Never an Option was released on 11 November 2013.

Man Must die entered the studio in 2018 to record the "Gagging Order" EP. This included 2 covers and the "Slave to the Animal" single and was released in 2019.

On 20 January 2023, the band announced their fifth album, The Pain Behind It All, would be released on 17 February, and also released the music video for the album's title track.

On 30 July 2024, the band announced on Facebook that they were disbanding, stating "Thank you to everyone who has supported MMD throughout the years. It's now time we officially say goodbye. Love and respect."

== Musical style ==
Man Must Die are known and praised for their highly energetic music style, with early releases containing elements of technical death metal, melodic death metal and even influences from old-school hardcore punk. Later releases show much more melodic elements coupled with a deathgrind-based sound. Vocalist Joe McGlynn deploys a vast variety of techniques. Ranging from harsh death growls to a high-pitched shriek and even the occasional spoken word more akin to the aforementioned hardcore genre. The lyrics deal with religion, murder, death, hate and warfare, usually written in a very aggressive fashion.

== Personnel ==
Final lineup

- Joe McGlynn – vocals (2002–2024)
- Alan McFarland – guitar (2002–2024)
- James Wright – bass (2017–2024)
- Tony Corio – drums (2017–2024)
- Michael Allan – guitar (2018–2024)

Former members

- Danny McNab – bass (2002–2012)
- John Lee – drums (2002–2008)
- Matt Holland – drums (2008–2011)
- René Hauffe – guitar (2009)
- Davy Sandford – guitar (2009–2010)
- James Burke – drums (2012–2017)
- Daniel Firth – bass (2012–2017)

Live members

- Todd Hansen – drums (2012)
- JJ McGowan – guitar (2010–2017)

== Discography ==
Studio albums

- ...Start Killing (2004)
- The Human Condition (Man Must Die album)|The Human Condition (2007)
- No Tolerance for Imperfection (2009)
- Peace Was Never an Option (2013)
- The Pain Behind It All (2023)

EPs

- Gagging Order (2019)

Demos

- The Season of Evil (2003)
