= Waiting for the End to Come =

Studio album by Kataklysm
- Released: October 25, 2013
- Recorded: 2013
- Genre: Death metal, melodic death metal
- Length: 45:04
- Label: Nuclear Blast
- Producer: Kataklysm

Kataklysm chronology
Heaven's Venom (2010)	Waiting for the End to Come (2013)	Of Ghosts and Gods (2015)

Waiting for the End to Come is the eleventh studio album by Canadian death metal band Kataklysm. The album was released on October 25, 2013 in the European Union. In the United Kingdom, it was released on October 28, 2013 and in the United States – on October 29, 2013.

== Track listing ==
All tracks are written by Kataklysm

No.	Title	Length
1.	"Fire"	5:27
2.	"If I Was God... I'd Burn It All"	4:38
3.	"Like Animals"	3:25
4.	"Kill the Elite"	4:15
5.	"Under Lawless Skies"	3:29
6.	"Dead & Buried"	3:12
7.	"The Darkest Days of Slumber"	3:52
8.	"Real Blood, Real Scars"	4:32
9.	"The Promise"	4:28
10.	"Empire of Dirt"	3:46
11.	"Elevate"	3:56
Total length:		45:04

Digipack bonus track
No.	Title	Length
12.	"The American Way (Sacred Reich cover)"	3:37
Total length:		48:41

== Credits ==
=== Personnel ===
- Maurizio Iacono – vocals
- Jean-François Dagenais – guitar
- Stephane Barbe – bass guitar
- Oli Beaudoin – drums

=== Production ===
- Zeuss – mixing, mastering
- Mircea Gabriel Eftemie – layout

=== Notes ===
In the music video for The American Way, Maurizio is seen playing bass while JF and Stephane both play guitar.
