= Heaven's Venom =

Studio album by Kataklysm
- Released: (Europe) August 13, 2010 (United States) August 24, 2010
- Recorded: JFD Studio, Ste-Marthe sur le lac, Quebec, Canada.
- Genre: Death metal, melodic death metal
- Length: 46:38
- Label: Nuclear Blast
- Producer: Kataklysm

Kataklysm chronology
Prevail (2008)	Heaven's Venom (2010)	Waiting for the End to Come (2013)

Singles from Heaven's Venom
- 1. "Determined (Vows Of Vengeance)" Released: July 13, 2010

Heaven's Venom is the tenth studio album by Canadian death metal band Kataklysm. It was released on August 13, 2010 (Europe) and August 24, 2010 (America) through Nuclear Blast.

== Track listing ==
No.	Title	Length
1.	"A Soulless God"	5:42
2.	"Determined (Vows of Vengeance)"	4:48
3.	"Faith Made of Shrapnel"	5:37
4.	"Push the Venom"	3:27
5.	"Hail the Renegade"	5:27
6.	"As the Walls Collapse"	4:51
7.	"Numb & Intoxicated"	3:26
8.	"At the Edge of the World"	3:59
9.	"Suicide River"	4:02
10.	"Das Feuer lebt (Exclusive Bonus Track)"	3:24
11.	"Blind Savior"	5:19
Total length:		50:02

== Personnel ==
Kataklysm

- Maurizio Iacono - Vocals
- Jean-François Dagenais - Guitars
- Stéphane Barbe - Bass
- Max Duhamel - Drums

Production

- Katja Michaelsen - Photography
- Tue Madsen - Mastering, Mixing
- John Huff - Cover Art, Layout
- Jean-François Dagenais - Engineering, Producer

== Chart performance ==
Chart (2010)	Peak position
German Albums Chart	35
