= Meditations (Kataklysm album) =

Kataklysm album

Studio album by Kataklysm
- Released: June 1, 2018
- Recorded: 2017–2018
- Genre: Melodic death metal
- Length: 38:47
- Label: Nuclear Blast

Kataklysm chronology
Of Ghosts and Gods (2015)	Meditations (2018)	Unconquered (2020)

Singles from Meditations
- 1. "Guillotine" Released: March 30, 2018; 2. "Narcissist" Released: May 5, 2018

Meditations is the thirteenth studio album by Canadian death metal band Kataklysm. The album was produced by the band's guitarist and drummer, Jean-François Dagenais and Oli Beaudoin respectively, and mixed by Jay Ruston, who helmed Anthrax and Stone Sour's latest records. Paul Logus mastered the album. The album was released on June 1, 2018. The band released a lyric video of the single 'Guillotine' on March 30, 2018, and another for the song 'Narcissist' on May 5, 2018. Singer Maurizio Iacono commented to Blabbermouth:

"This is a very personal album to me with old wounds being revisited — I felt a big urge to pour my soul into this release. The boys and I were isolated under the same roof during the writing process, just like we did in the early days... with no worries except having fun, being honest and delivering a serious album that represents us today but respects our past. Our new story is coming and we are eager to share it with you!”

== Reception ==
Professional ratings
Review scores
Source	Rating
Distorted Sound	9/10
Metal Hammer UK	7/10
Rock Hard	8.5/10

The album has received positive reviews by critics. Metal Injection gave the album 7.5/10. Dom Lawson of Metal Hammer gave the album 3.5/5 stars in his review. Distorted Sound Magazine gave the album 9/10 in their reviews.

== Track listing ==
All tracks written by the band:

No.	Title	Length
1.	"Guillotine"	2:56
2.	"Outsider"	3:57
3.	"The Last Breath I'll Take Is Yours"	3:14
4.	"Narcissist"	2:41
5.	"Born to Kill and Destined to Die"	3:57
6.	"In Limbic Resonance"	4:51
7.	"And Then I Saw Blood"	4:37
8.	"What Doesn't Break Doesn't Heal"	3:21
9.	"Bend the Arc and Cut the Cord"	3:48
10.	"Achilles' Heel"	5:19
Total length:		38:47

== Credits ==
Personnel

- Maurizio Iacono - vocals
- J-F Dagenais - lead, rhythm and all guitars
- Stéphane Barbe - bass guitar
- Oli Beaudoin - drums, percussion

Guest Session

- Francis Bouillon - samples

Production

- Jay Ruston - mixing
- Paul Logus - mastering
- J-F Dagenais - engineering
- Oli Beaudoin - engineering
- Ocvlta Designs by Surtsey - cover artwork, design and layouts
