= Victims of this Fallen World =

Studio album by Kataklysm
- Released: October 5, 1998
- Genre: Death metal
- Length: 45:28
- Label: Hypernotic
- Producer: Jean-François Dagenais

Kataklysm chronology
Northern Hyperblast Live (1998)	Victims of this Fallen World (1998)	The Prophecy (Stigmata of the Immaculate) (2000)

Professional ratings
Review scores
Source	Rating
Chronicles of Chaos	6.5/10

Victims of this Fallen World is the third studio album by Canadian death metal band Kataklysm. It is the first Kataklysm album to feature Maurizio Iacono as frontman and lead vocalist. The album was eventually re-recorded in 2005.

== Track listing ==
No.	Title	Length
1.	"As My World Burns"	5:41
2.	"Imminent Downfall"	4:31
3.	"Feared Resistance"	3:54
4.	"Caged In"	3:36
5.	"Portraits of Anger"	2:51
6.	"Extreme to the Core"	2:43
7.	"Courage Through Hope"	4:19
8.	"A View from Inside"	5:13
9.	"(God)head"	4:45
10.	"Embracing Europa"	3:44
11.	"I Remember"	3:42
12.	"World of Treason II" (Instrumental)	4:10
Total length:		45:28

== Personnel ==
- Maurizio Iacono – Vocals
- Stephane Barbe – Bass
- Jean-François Dagenais – Guitar, record producer
- Max Duhamel – drums
