= Augury (band) =

Canadian progressive death metal band

- Origin: Montreal, Quebec, Canada
- Genres: Progressive death metal
- Years active: 2002-present
- Labels: The Artisan Era, Nuclear Blast, Galy
- Members: Patrick Loisel; Mathieu Marcotte; Dominic "Forest" Lapointe; Antoine Baril
- Past members: Étienne Gallo; Arianne Fleury; Gabrielle Borgia; Mathieu Groulx; Philipe Cousineau
- Website: www.augurymetal.com

Augury is a progressive death metal band from Montreal, Quebec who released their debut album, Concealed in September 2004 on Galy Records, and a follow-up, Fragmentary Evidence, in July 2009 on Nuclear Blast Records. Their third album was released in 2018 on The Artisan Era.

== History ==
Although the idea to create the band had been in discussions between members since they met in 1997, the formation of Augury did not take place until 2002 when lead guitarist Mathieu Marcotte left his band Spasme, and began to audition drummers. He was soon joined by Dominic "Forest" Lapointe of Atheretic fame on bass, and Arianne Fleury on vocals. Vocalist and guitarist Patrick Loisel joined in February 2002 after leaving the band Kralizec. Ex-Adenine drummer Mathieu Groulx joined the band in June 2002.

With this line-up, Augury wrote their first six songs and played their first show, but soon Mathieu Groulx departed due to a lack of time and different musical taste. The band continued to write more songs and began to add strings to their compositions. Étienne Gallo joined as a drummer and in September 2004 their debut album Concealed was recorded and released by Galy Records.

Although work began on the second album soon after the release of Concealed, it was spread over four years due to line-up changes. In 2006, drummer Étienne Gallo left and Augury decided to work with another drummer for a year, but scheduling problems led to Gallo being called back. Gallo learned all the songs and helped record them, but since it was a temporary situation, drummer Antoine Baril was recruited. As Patrick, Forest, and Mathieu each wrote a third of the album, the band also diversified their sound.

It was during the writing of their second album that members of the band Kataklysm introduced Augury's songs to Nuclear Blast, who signed Augury to the label and let them retain their sound. Fragmentary Evidence was released in July and August 2009 in Europe and North America respectively. Due to songs like "Jupiter to Ignite" and "Oversee the Rebirth" being very layered, complex and lengthy, Augury do not play the former and only play the first half of the latter in live performances.

Between the end of 2009 and the beginning of 2010, the band parted ways with drummer Antoine Baril and long-time bassist Dominic Lapointe. Former Neuraxis drummer Tommy McKinnon (who joined full-time since then) and MAG bassist Christian Pacaud were recruited as temporary replacements for The American Defloration North American tour with The Black Dahlia Murder, Obscura, and Hatesphere.

Étienne Gallo and Dominic Lapointe rejoined the band in 2013. In 2018, Augury released the digital album Illusive Golden Age

== Band members ==
=== Current ===
- Patrick Loisel – Vocals, Guitars (2002–present)
- Mathieu Marcotte – Guitars (2002–present)
- Dominic "Forest" Lapointe – Bass (2002–2010, 2012–present)
- Antoine Baril – Drums (2009, 2011-2012, 2015–present)

=== Former ===
- Sébastien Pittet - Bass (2010-2012)
- Étienne Gallo – Drums (2003–2006, 2007-2009, 2012–2015)
- Mathieu Groulx – Drums (2002)
- Philipe Cousineau – Drums (2006-2007)
- Arianne Fleury – Vocals (2002-2005)

=== Live ===
- Christian Pacaud – Bass (2010)
- Robin Stone – Drums (2009)
- Tommy McKinnon - Drums (2010)

== Discography ==
- Concealed (2004), Galy Records
- Promo 2006 (2006), Independent
- Fragmentary Evidence (2009), Nuclear Blast
- Illusive Golden Age (2018), The Artisan Era
