= Serenity in Fire =

Studio album by Kataklysm
- Released: March 9, 2004
- Recorded: Victor Studio, Montreal, Canada (November 2003)
- Genre: Death metal
- Length: 38:26
- Label: Nuclear Blast
- Producer: Jean-François Dagenais

Kataklysm chronology
Shadows & Dust (2002)	Serenity in Fire (2004)	In the Arms of Devastation (2006)

Professional ratings
Review scores
Source	Rating
AllMusic	3/5 stars
Gryphon Metal.Ch	9/10
Rock Hard	9.5/10

Serenity in Fire is the seventh studio album by the Canadian death metal band Kataklysm. The spoken passage in the track The Ambassador of Pain is a quote from Paul Newman's character in the film, Road to Perdition. Peter Tägtgren contributed guest vocals on the album.

The song "As I Slither" was featured on the soundtrack for the film Alone in the Dark (2005) via Nuclear Blast, which is considered one of the worst movies ever made, starring actress Tara Reid.

The song "The Night They Returned" was originally composed for the feature film (also titled The Night They Returned) by independent filmmaker Sv Bell. Ultimately, Nuclear Blast did not authorize the use of the track for the film. Members of the band make a brief cameo in the movie, which was released in 2004.

== Track listing ==
All songs written by Maurizio Iacono, Jean-François Dagenais, Stephane Barbe and Martin Maurais.

No.	Title	Length
1.	"The Ambassador of Pain"	2:33
2.	"The Resurrected"	3:26
3.	"As I Slither"	2:57
4.	"For All Our Sins" (featuring Peter Tägtgren of Hypocrisy)	6:14
5.	"The Night They Returned"	3:53
6.	"Serenity in Fire"	4:38
7.	"Blood on the Swans"	2:44
8.	"10 Seconds from the End"	2:46
9.	"The Tragedy I Preach"	4:43
10.	"Under the Bleeding Sun"	4:32
Total length:		38:26

== Personnel ==
Kataklysm

- Maurizio Iacono – Vocals
- Jean-François Dagenais – Guitar
- Stephane Barbe – Bass
- Martin Maurais – Drums

Guest musicians

- Peter Tägtgren – Guest vocals on "For All Our Sins"
- Jordan Dare – Guest vocals on "10 Seconds from the End"

Production

- Jean-François Dagenais – Producer, engineering, mixing
- Bernard Belly – Mastering
- Yannick St. Amand – Engineering
- Maurizio Iacono – Lyrics
- Markus Staiger – Executive producer
