= Shadows & Dust =

Studio album by Kataklysm
- Released: October 15, 2002
- Recorded: June 2002 at Victor Studio, Montreal
- Genre: Death metal
- Length: 40:17
- Language: English
- Label: Nuclear Blast

Kataklysm chronology
Epic: The Poetry of War (2001)	Shadows & Dust (2002)	Serenity in Fire (2004)

Professional ratings
Review scores
Source	Rating
AllMusic	4/5 stars

Shadows & Dust is the sixth studio album by Canadian death metal band Kataklysm.

== Track listing ==
No.	Title	Length
1.	"In Shadows & Dust"	2:46
2.	"Beyond Salvation"	4:10
3.	"Illuminati"	4:59
4.	"Chronicles of the Damned"	3:14
5.	"Bound in Chains"	3:24
6.	"Where the Enemy Sleeps..."	5:20
7.	"Centuries (Beneath the Dark Waters)"	5:57
8.	"Face the Face of War"	5:10
9.	"Years of Enlightment / Decades in Darkness"	5:15
Total length:		40:17

== Personnel ==
Kataklysm

- Maurizio Iacono - Vocals
- Jean-François Dagenais - Guitar
- Stephane Barbe - Bass
- Max Duhamel - Drums

Production

- Jean-François Dagenais - Produced, engineered and mixed
- Yannick St-Amant - Additional engineering
- Bernard Belley - Mastering
- Maurizio Iacono - Lyrics
- Alan Douches - Mastering (Re-Release)
