= Fragmentary Evidence =

Studio album by Augury
- Released: July 17th, 2009
- Recorded: 2008 at Northern Studio and Surgeon's Lab Studio
- Genre: Progressive death metal
- Length: 55:02
- Label: Nuclear Blast
- Producers: Hugues Deslauriers, Yannick St-Amand and Augury

Augury chronology
Concealed (2004)	Fragmentary Evidence (2009)

Professional ratings
Review scores
Source	Rating
About.com	4/5 stars
Allmusic	4/5 stars

Fragmentary Evidence is the second full-length album by the Canadian progressive death metal band Augury. It was released in Europe on July 17, 2009 and in North America on August 11, 2009.

== Track listing ==
All lyrics written by Patrick Loisel.

No.	Title	Music	Length
1.	"Aetheral"	Marcotte	4:18
2.	"Simian Cattle"	Lapointe	5:38
3.	"Orphans of Living"	Marcotte	5:10
4.	"Jupiter to Ignite"	Lapointe	8:24
5.	"Sovereigns Unknown"	Loisel	5:13
6.	"Skyless"	Lapointe	6:30
7.	"Faith Puppeteers"	Loisel	4:07
8.	"Brimstone Landscapes"	Loisel	4:30
9.	"Oversee the Rebirth"	Marcotte	11:12
Total length:			55:02

== Personnel ==
Augury

- Patrick Loisel – vocals, electric guitar, 12-string acoustic guitar
- Mathieu Marcotte – electric guitar, 12-string acoustic guitar
- Dominic (Forest) Lapointe – 4-string fretless bass, 6-string bass
- Étienne Gallo – drums

Guest Vocalists

- Sven De Caluwe (Aborted) - "Aetheral"
- Eric Fiset - "Aetheral"
- Sébastien Croteau - "Orphans of Living"
- Syriak - "Sovereigns Unknown" and "Brimstone Landscapes"
- Leilindel (UneXpect) - "Sovereigns Unknown" and "Brimstone Landscapes"
- Youri Raymond - "Faith Puppeteers" and "Oversee the Rebirth"
- Filip Ivanovic - "Oversee the Rebirth"

Production

- Hugues Deslauriers - Producer, Assistant mixing, recording for vocals, bass, 12-string acoustic guitar, guitar solos and clean electric guitars
- Yannick St-Amand - producer, recording for drums and rhythm guitar
- J-F Dagenais - mixing
- Antoine Lussier - assistant engineer on drum editing
- James Murphy - mastering

Additional

- Sven - cover artwork and layout
- Martin Lacroix - logo design
- Mélany Champagne - photography
- Ethan Djankovich - sound effects
