= Asylon =

Studio album by Neuraxis
- Released: February 15, 2011
- Recorded: Wildsound Studio (drums) and Garage Studio (guitar, bass, vocals) in June 2010
- Genre: Technical death metal, melodic death metal
- Length: 39:34
- Label: Prosthetic
- Producer: Chris Donaldson, Neuraxis

Neuraxis chronology
The Thin Line Between (2008)	Asylon (2011)

Professional ratings
Review scores
Source	Rating
AllMusic	4.5/5 stars
Blabbermouth.net	(7/10)
Bravewords	(8/10)
Chronicles of Chaos	(6.5/10)
Exclaim!	favorable
Rock Hard	8.5/10

Asylon is the sixth studio album by Canadian death metal band Neuraxis. It was released on February 15, 2011, by Prosthetic Records.

== Track listing ==
All lyrics are written by Alex Leblanc; all music is composed by Rob Milley except where noted.

No.	Title	Length
1.	"Reptile"	2:45
2.	"Asylum"	4:45
3.	"Savior and Destroyer"	4:38
4.	"By the Flesh"	4:16
5.	"Sinister"	3:31
6.	"Trauma"	3:51
7.	"Resilience"	2:23
8.	"Purity"	4:20
9.	"V" (Milley, Olivier Pinard)	3:33
10.	"Left to Devour" (Milley, Pinard)	5:32
Total length:		39:34

== Personnel ==
=== Neuraxis ===
- Alex Leblanc – vocals
- Rob Milley – guitar
- Olivier Pinard – bass
- Olivier Beaudoin – drums

=== Additional musician ===
- Bill Robinson – vocals on "Savior and Destroyer"

=== Production ===
- Neuraxis – production
- Chris Donaldson – production, mixing, sound engineering
- Alan Douches – mastering

=== Additional personnel ===
- Dennis Sibeijn – artwork, layout
- Ben Von Wong – photography
