= Prevail (album) =

Studio album by Kataklysm
- Released: May 23, 2008
- Genre: Death metal, melodic death metal
- Length: 44:10
- Label: Nuclear Blast
- Producer: Jean-François Dagenais

Kataklysm chronology
In the Arms of Devastation (2006)	Prevail (2008)	Heaven's Venom (2010)

Singles from Prevail
- 1. "Taking the World by Storm" Released: May 30, 2008

Professional ratings
Review scores
Source	Rating
About.com	4/5 stars
AllMusic	3/5 stars

Prevail is the ninth studio album by Canadian death metal band Kataklysm, released May 23, 2008 in Europe and June 6, 2008, in North America. Music videos were filmed for the tracks "Taking The World By Storm" and "Blood in Heaven".

== Track listing ==
All tracks written by Maurizio Iacono, Jean-François Daganais, Stéphane Barbe and Max Duhamel

No.	Title	Length
1.	"Prevail"	3:54
2.	"Taking the World by Storm"	3:59
3.	"The Chains of Power"	3:19
4.	"As Death Lingers"	3:30
5.	"Blood in Heaven"	5:15
6.	"To the Throne of Sorrow"	4:49
7.	"Breathe to Dominate"	3:59
8.	"Tear Down the Kingdom"	4:21
9.	"The Vultures Are Watching"	5:57
10.	"The Last Effort (Renaissance II)"	5:01
Total length:		44:10

A bonus DVD was included containing the "Taking the World by Storm" video, a photo gallery and a live performance in December 2007 at DeepRockDrive studios in Las Vegas. The songs were voted for by fans watching the performance online.

No.	Title	Length
1.	"Like Angels Weeping (The Dark)"
2.	"As I Slither"
3.	"In Shadows & Dust"
4.	"Crippled and Broken"
5.	"The Ambassador of Pain"
6.	"Let Them Burn"
7.	"Manipulator of Souls"
8.	"The Resurrected"
9.	"Face The Face of War"
10.	"Where The Enemy Sleeps"
11.	"The Road To Devastation"

Bass player Stéphane Barbe was replaced by François Mongrain from the band Martyr for the performance, as he was home for the birth of his daughter.

== Personnel ==
Kataklysm

- Maurizio Iacono - Vocals
- Jean-François Dagenais - Guitar
- Stéphane Barbe - Bass
- Max Duhamel - Drums

Guest musicians

- Pat O'Brien (Cannibal Corpse) - Guitars
- Dave Linsk (Overkill) - Guitars
- Jason Suecof - Guitars

Production

- Jean-François Dagenais - Producer, Engineering
- Jason Suecof - Mixing
- Mark Lewis - Engineering
- Alan Douches - Mastering, Engineering
- Pascal Laquerre - Cover art
