= In the Arms of Devastation =

Studio album by Kataklysm
- Released: February 21, 2006
- Recorded: Mixart Studio (July 2005); JFD Studio in Laval, Quebec, Canada (August–September 2005)
- Genre: Death metal, melodic death metal
- Length: 41:07
- Label: Nuclear Blast
- Producer: Jean-François Dagenais

Kataklysm chronology
Serenity in Fire (2004)	In the Arms of Devastation (2006)	Prevail (2008)

Professional ratings
Review scores
Source	Rating
About.com	4.5/5
AllMusic	3.5/5
Rock Hard	10/10

In the Arms of Devastation is the eighth studio album by the Canadian death metal band Kataklysm.

== Track listing ==
No.	Title	Length
1.	"Like Angels Weeping (The Dark) "	4:27
2.	"Let Them Burn"	3:19
3.	"Crippled & Broken"	4:32
4.	"To Reign Again"	4:25
5.	"It Turns to Rust"	4:04
6.	"Open Scars"	4:06
7.	"Temptation's Nest"	3:46
8.	"In Words of Desperation"	5:10
9.	"The Road to Devastation"	7:14
Total length:		41:07

=== Notes ===
1. The quote "Revenge is a meal best served cold" on Like Angels Weeping (The Dark) is taken from Man on Fire.

== Personnel ==
Kataklysm

- Maurizio Iacono – vocals
- Jean-François Dagenais – guitar, producer
- Stéphane Barbe – bass guitar
- Max Duhamel – drums

Guest musicians

- Morgan Lander – guest vocals on It Turns to Rust
- Tim Roth – guest appearance on The Road to Devastation
- Rob Doherty – guest appearance on The Road to Devastation

Production

- Jean-François Dagenais – producer, engineered
- Tue Madsen – mixing, mastering
- Maurizio Iacono – lyrics
- Anthony Clarkson – cover art
- Jean Luc Lavoie – photography
