= The Mystical Gate of Reincarnation =

EP by Kataklysm
- Released: November 30, 1993
- Recorded: Peter Pan Studios, Montreal, Canada
- Genre: Death metal
- Length: 21:00
- Label: Nuclear Blast
- Producer: Kataklysm and Markus Staiger

Kataklysm chronology
The Mystical Gate of Reincarnation (1993)	Sorcery (1995)

The Mystical Gate of Reincarnation is an EP by Canadian death metal, Kataklysm and contains their demo, The Death Gate Cycle of Reincarnation and the bonus track The Orb of Uncreation. It was released in 1993.

== Track listing ==
No.	Title	Length
1.	"Frozen in Time (Chapter I: Will of Suicide)"	7:23
2.	"Mystical Plane of Evil (Chapter II: Enigma of the Unknown)"	5:31
3.	"Shrine of Life (Chapter III: Reborn Through Death)"	4:53
4.	"The Orb of Uncreation"	3:13
Total length:		21:00

== Personnel ==
- Sylvain Houde – lead vocals
- Jean-François Dagenais – lead guitar
- Stéphane Côté – rhythm guitar
- Maurizio Iacono – bass, backing vocals
- Ariel Saïed – drums
- Max Duhamel - drums on The orb of uncreation

Production

- Marcus Staiger - Producer
- Pierre Rémillard - Engineering, Mixing
- Sv Bell – Cover artwork
- Terry Petrilli – Photography
