= Passage in Time =

Compilation album by Quo Vadis
- Released: September 2001
- Recorded: At various locations between 1995 and 2001
- Genres: Melodic death metal Progressive death metal Technical death metal
- Length: 40:54
- Label: Skyscraper Records
- Producers: Quo Vadis and others

Quo Vadis chronology
Day into Night (2000)	Passage in Time (2001)	Defiant Imagination (2004)

Professional ratings
Review scores
Source	Rating
Sputnik	3.9/5 link

Passage in Time is a compilation album by the Canadian melodic death metal band Quo Vadis and was released in 2001 by Skyscraper Music. It contains their entire 1995 Demo, a rerecorded version of Vital Signs, a remixed version of the Hunted, and two live songs recorded at Foufounes Electriques in Montreal and the music video for Dysgenics.

== Track listing ==
No.	Title	Lyrics	Music	Notes	Length
1.	"Vital Signs 2000"	Arie Itman	Itman, Bart Frydrychowicz	Vital Signs 2000, As One, The Hunted (Hunter-Killer Remix) were recorded, mixed and mastered at Victor Studios, Montreal, Canada from June 30th to September 17th 1999. Recorded by Pierre Remillard, Louis Legault, and Jean-Francois Dagenais. Mixed by Pierre Remillard and Quo Vadis.	3:11
2.	"As One"	Itman	Itman		4:07
3.	"The Hunted (Hunter-Killer Remix)"	Itman	Itman		3:51
4.	"Dysgenics (Live)"	Itman	Itman	Live tracks recorded at Foufounes Electriques, Montreal on March 11th, 2001 by Yannick St-Amant. Mixed by JF Dagenais at Victor Studios.	6:09
5.	"Point of no Return - Mute Requiem (Live)"	Frydrychowicz	Frydrychowicz		5:29
6.	"Element of the Ensemble (1995)"	Yanic Bercier	Itman, Frydrychowicz	1995 Demo tracks were recorded at Gilles Peltier Studio between January 4–5, and Bass was recorded at Peter Pan Studio in July 1995. Tracks mixed by Tom MacDonald and mastered by Sylvain Brisebois.	3:25
7.	"Sons of Greed (1995)"	Frydrychowicz	Frydrychowicz, Itman		5:22
8.	"Vital Signs (1995)"	Itman	Itman, Frydrychowicz		5:01
9.	"Sadness (1995)"	Instrumental	Frydrychowicz		4:48
Total length:					40:54

== Personnel ==
- Arie Itman – vocals, guitar, violin, solo on track 4
- Bart Frydrychowicz – guitar, vocals, solo on track 5 and 7
- Remy Beaucahmp– bass, backing vocals
- Yanic Bercier – drums, backing vocals
