= Concealed (album) =

Studio album by Augury
- Released: September 14, 2004
- Recorded: Wild Studio & Victor Studio
- Genre: Technical death metal
- Length: 47:18
- Label: Galy
- Producers: Jean-Fancois Dagenais, Yannick St-Amand and Augury

Augury chronology
Concealed (2004)	Fragmentary Evidence (2009)

Concealed is the full-length debut album by the Canadian progressive death metal band Augury. It was released on September 14, 2004, through Galy Records.

== Track listing ==
No.	Title	Length
1.	"Beatus"	4:04
2.	"...Ever Know Peace Again"	3:34
3.	"Cosmic Migration"	5:56
4.	"Nocebo"	5:21
5.	"Alien Shores"	4:13
6.	"In Russian Dolls Universes"	4:40
7.	"Becoming God"	4:00
8.	"The Lair of Purity"	7:27
9.	"From Eden Estranged..."	4:11
10.	"...As Sea Devours Land"	3:49
Total length:		47:18

== Personnel ==
Augury

- Arianne Fleury - soprano and choir voices
- Patrick Loisel – Main vocals, electric guitar, 12-string acoustic guitar
- Mathieu Marcotte – electric guitar, 12-string acoustic guitar
- Dominic (Forest) Lapointe – 4-string fretless bass, 6-string bass
- Étienne Gallo – drums

Production

- Yannick St-Amand - recording, mixing
- Jean-Francois Dagenais - recording, mixing
- Bernard Belley - mastering
