= Canadian Independent Music Awards =

Canadian music award

The Canadian Independent Music Awards, also known as the Independent Music Awards or Indies, are national awards presented annually to musicians to acknowledge their artistic and technical achievements in all aspects of music. They were first inaugurated in 2000, and are awarded in Toronto as part of Canada Music Week.
