= Neuraxis (band) =

Canadian technical death metal band

- Origin: Montreal, Quebec, Canada
- Genres: Technical death metal, melodic death metal
- Years active: 1994–2015 (On hiatus)
- Labels: Willowtip, Prosthetic
- Members: Robin Milley; Alex Leblanc; Olivier Pinard
- Past members: Yan Thiel; Tommy McKinnon; Felipe Angel Q. Maynard Moore; Chris Alsop; Alex Erian; Julien Mercier; Steven Henry; Ian Campbell; Will Seghers; Oli Beaudoin
- Website: www.neuraxis.org

Neuraxis was a Canadian technical death metal band formed in Montreal in 1994. They have released six studio albums: Imagery (1997), A Passage into Forlorn (2001), Truth Beyond... (2002), Trilateral Progression (2005), The Thin Line Between (2008), and Asylon (2011).

In 2007, the band participated in the Domination Tour alongside Rotting Christ, Incantation and Malevolent Creation. After touring, the band released a live album entitled Live Progression. Neuraxis participated in the Montreal Assault Tour with Despised Icon, Beneath the Massacre, Carnifex and Plasmarifle to promote their album The Thin Line Between.

The band released their sixth studio album, Asylon, on February 15, 2011.

== Members ==
Neuraxis lineups
1994–1997	Maynard Moore – vocals; Steven Henry – guitar; Felipe A. Quinzanos – guitar; Yan Thiel – bass; Mathieu Royal – drums
1997–1999 Imagery	Maynard Moore – lead vocals; Steven Henry – guitars; Rob Milley – guitars; Yan Thiel – bass guitar; Mathieu Royal – drums
1999 In Silence (demo)	Chris Alsop – vocals; Steven Henry – guitars; Rob Milley – guitars; Yan Thiel – bass guitar; Martin Auger – drums
1999–2003 Virtuosity (demo) A Passage into Forlorn Truth Beyond...	Ian Campbell – vocals; Steven Henry – guitars; Rob Milley – guitars; Yan Thiel – bass guitar; Alex Erian – drums
2003–2004	Ian Campbell – vocals; Steven Henry – guitars; Rob Milley – guitars; Yan Thiel – bass guitar; Etienne Gallo – drums
2004–2006 Trilateral Progression	Ian Campbell – vocals; Steven Henry – guitars; Rob Milley – guitars; Yan Thiel – bass guitar; Tommy McKinnon – drums
2006	Ian Campbell – vocals; William Seghers – guitars; Rob Milley – guitars; Yan Thiel – bass guitar; Tommy McKinnon – drums
2007–2009 Live Progression The Thin Line Between	Alex Leblanc – vocals; William Seghers – guitars; Rob Milley – guitars; Yan Thiel – bass guitar; Tommy McKinnon – drums
2009–2013	Alex Leblanc – vocals; Rob Milley – guitars; Olivier Pinard – bass guitar; Oli Beaudoin – drums

=== Current ===
- Rob Milley – guitar (1996–present)
- Alex Leblanc – vocals (2007–present)
- Olivier Pinard – bass (2009–present)

=== Former ===
Vocals

- Maynard Moore (Plasmarifle) (1994–1999)
- Chris Alsop (Torn Within) (1999)
- Ian Campbell (Descend into Nothingness) (1999–2007)

Guitar

- Felipe A. Quinzanos (1994–1996)
- Steven Henry (Urban Aliens, Empathy Denied, Idiotpathetics) (1994–2006)
- Will Seghers (2006–2010)

Bass

- Yan Thiel (Exult) (1994–2009)

Drums

- Mathieu Royal (1995–1998)
- Alex Erian (Despised Icon) (1999–2003)
- Tommy McKinnon (Humanoid) (2004–2009)
- Oli Beaudoin – drums (2009–2013)

Session musicians

- Etienne Gallo (Augury, Negativa) – drums (2003–2004)
- Martin Auger – drums (1999)
- Julien Mercier – drums (1998)

== Discography ==
=== Studio albums ===
- Imagery (1997)
- A Passage into Forlorn (2001)
- Truth Beyond... (2002)
- Trilateral Progression (2005)
- The Thin Line Between (2008)
- Asylon (2011)

=== Live albums ===
- Live Progression (2007)

=== Compilations ===
- Imagery/A Passage into Forlorn (2004)
- Truth/Imagery/Passage (2004)

=== Demos ===
- Le Promo d'Imagery (1996)
- In Silence (1999)
- Virtuosity (1999)
- Promo (2001)
- Promo 2007 (2007)
