= Kataklysm =

Canadian death metal band

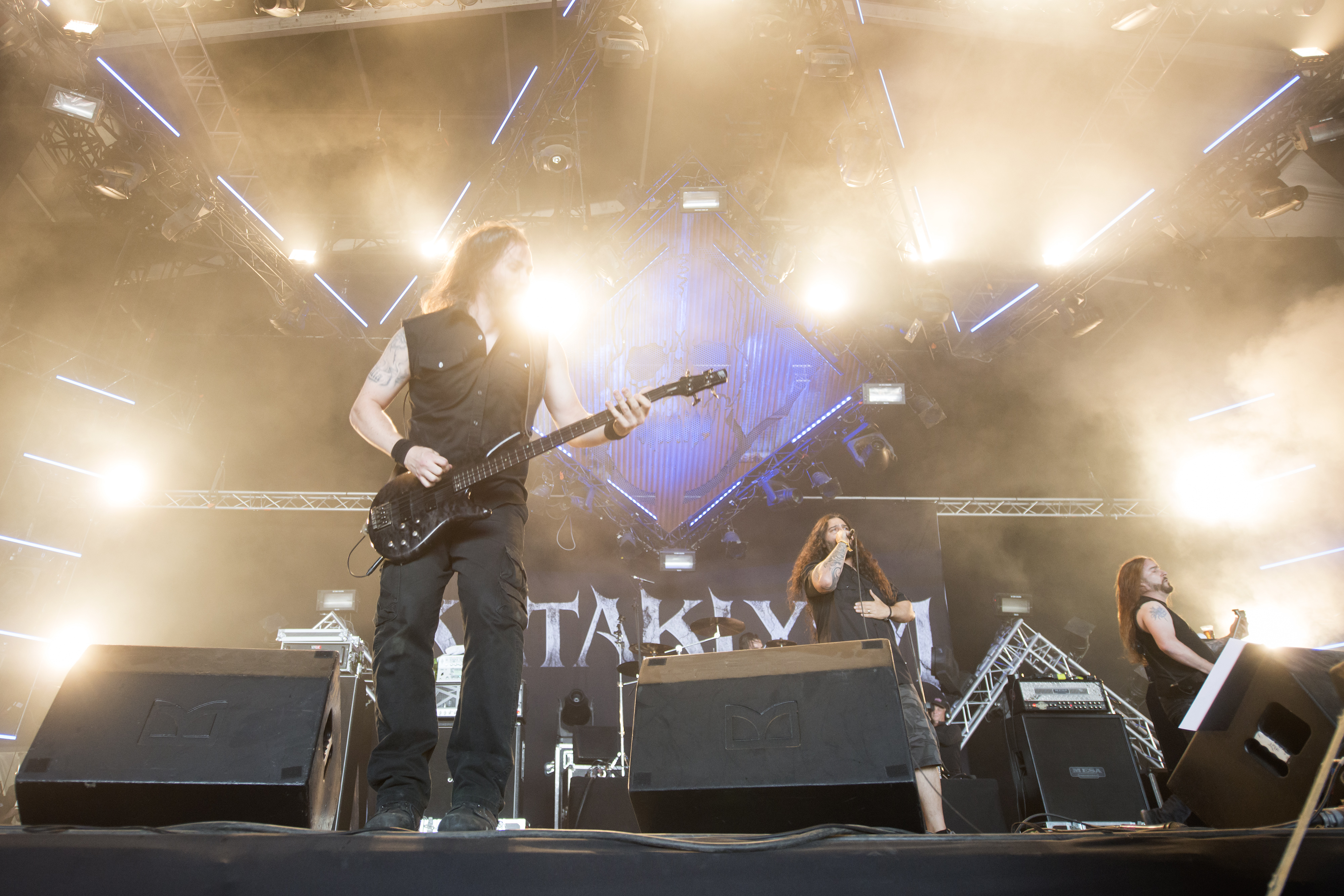
- Kataklysm performing at the 2018 edition of Hellfest in France

Background information
- Also known as: Northern Hyperblast
- Origin: Montreal, Quebec, Canada
- Genres: Death metal, melodic death metal
- Years active: 1991–present
- Label: Nuclear Blast
- Members: Maurizio Iacono; Jean-François Dagenais; Stephane Barbe; James Payne
- Past members: Sylvain Houde; Stéphane Côté; Martin Maurais; Nick Miller; Ariel Saied Martinez; Max Duhamel; Oli Beaudoin
- Website: www.kataklysm.ca

Kataklysm is a Canadian death metal band. As of 2024, they have released fifteen studio albums, two EPs, and two DVDs. Kataklysm received their first Juno Award (the Canadian equivalent of the Grammy) for Best Album of the Year in the "Heavy Metal" category for their 2015 album Of Ghosts and Gods.

== History ==
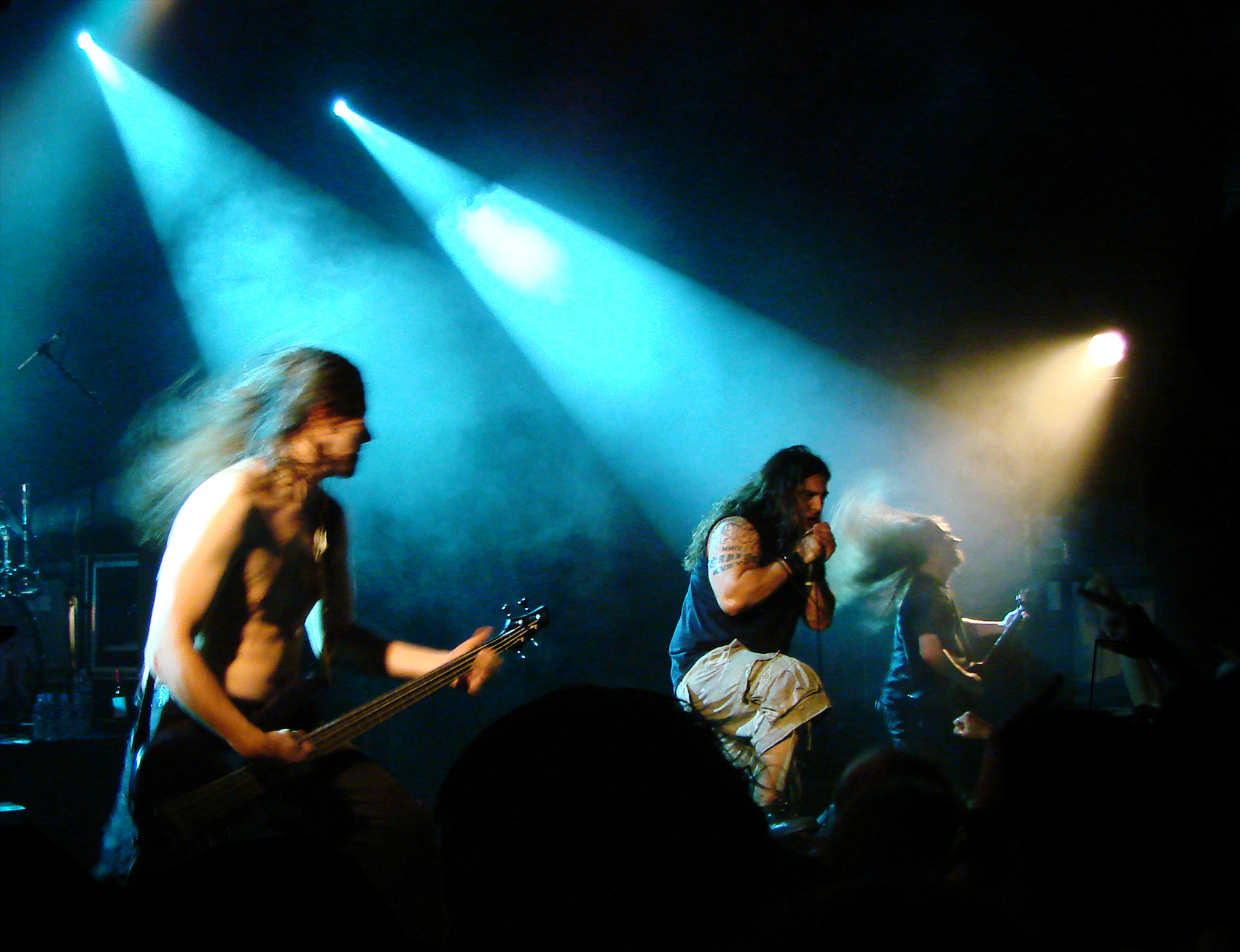
Kataklysm performing in 2007

Kataklysm was formed in Montreal, Quebec in September 1991. Early in their career, the band became known for their fast and technical brand of death metal, referred to as the Northern Hyperblast. Nuclear Blast discovered the band in 1992 after the release of their debut demo, The Death Gate Cycle of Reincarnation, which received significant acclaim in the underground metal scene. In 1994, Kataklysm signed with Nuclear Blast and released their first EP, The Mystical Gate of Reincarnation, followed by their debut album, Sorcery, in 1995. In 1996, they released their second full-length album, Temple of Knowledge, which included their first music video for the track "The Awakener". However, following the album's release, founding member and lead vocalist Sylvain Houde left the band, citing emotional difficulties related to the end of a romantic relationship. Bassist Maurizio Iacono subsequently took over as vocalist, with Stephane Barbe replacing him as bassist. This shift also marked a change in the band's musical direction, with Iacono and founding guitarist JF Dagenais assuming creative leadership.

In 1998, Kataklysm released their third studio album, Victims of this Fallen World—Iacono's first as vocalist—which saw the begin to hint at a more melodic approach to death metal. The 2000 album The Prophecy (Stigmata of the Immaculate) further refined this style, reducing the chaotic elements of their earlier work and incorporating stronger thrash metal influences. Their 2001 release, Epic: The Poetry of War, continued to add melodic elements to their death metal sound, earning them further critical acclaim. In 2002, the band released Shadows & Dust, widely regarded as one of their most successful albums. It received overwhelmingly positive reviews and marked an increase in sales compared to their previous releases. This album was also their first to chart in countries such as Germany, Austria, and Switzerland, and included one of their most recognisable tracks: "In Shadows & Dust".

Two years later, in 2004, the band released Serenity in Fire. The album was notable for the temporary absence of drummer Max Duhamel, who was replaced by Martin Maurais due to an injury. Serenity in Fire was well received and included two of the band's most iconic tracks: "As I Slither" and "The Ambassador of Pain". Duhamel recovered in time to perform on the band's eighth studio album, In the Arms of Devastation, released in 2006. This album was a significant success, with sales exceeding 50,000 units and achieving the band's highest charting positions up to that point.

The subsequent album, Prevail, demonstrated Kataklysm's continued rise in popularity, with sales again surpassing 50,000 units. The single "Taking the World by Storm" became the band's most-watched track on YouTube, garnering over three million views. In 2008, Kataklysm performed at the UK's Bloodstock festival, sharing the stage with headliners Nightwish and Dimmu Borgir.

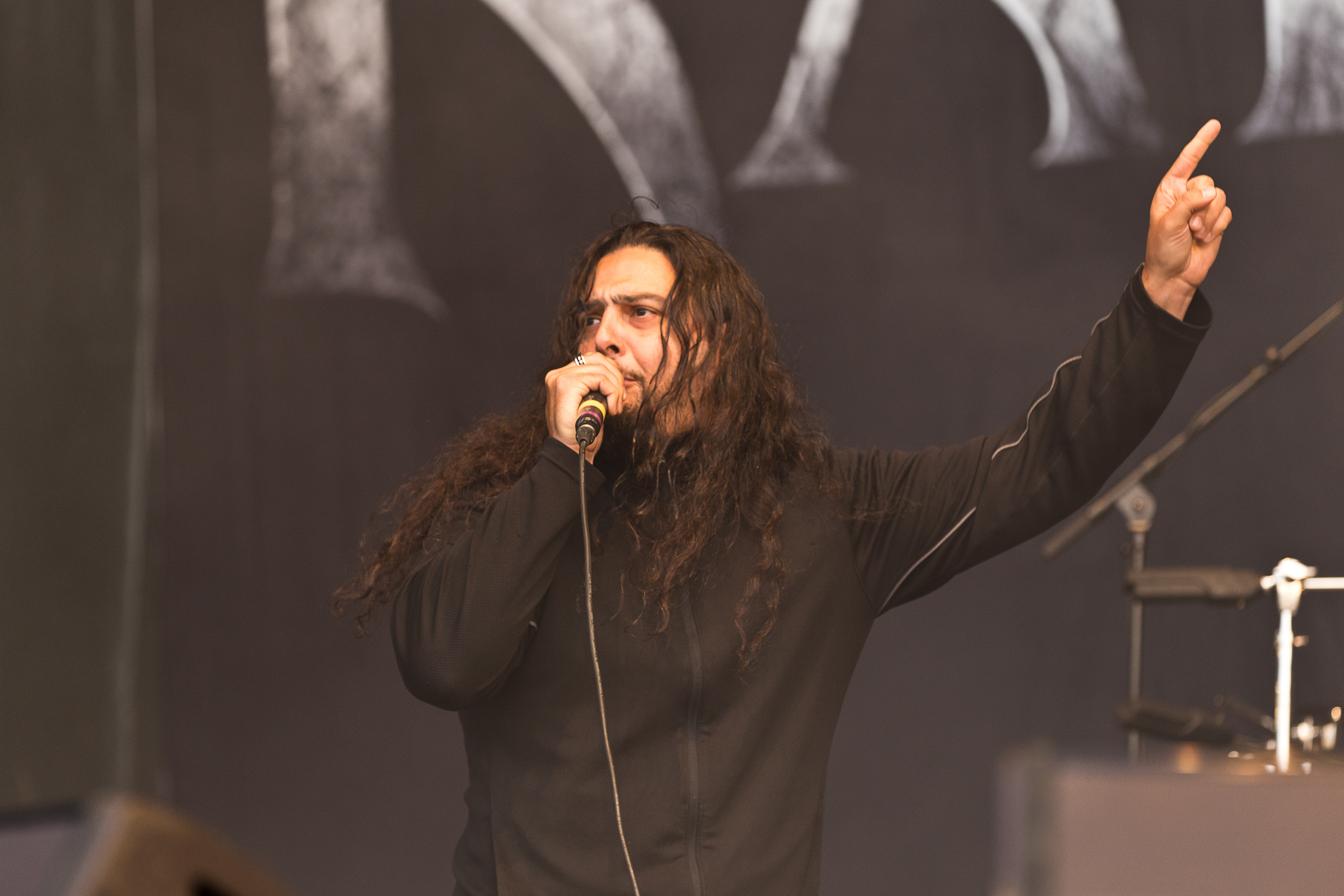
Maurizio Iacono in 2015

The band released their eleventh studio album, Waiting for the End to Come, on October 29, 2013, followed by their twelfth album, Of Ghosts and Gods, on July 31, 2015. Both albums received widespread acclaim. Kataklysm supported In Flames on their tour of North America in May 2017. Kataklysm's thirteenth studio album, Meditations, was released in June 2018. Meditations became the band's first album to chart on the Billboard Top 100, peaking at #61. It also marked their highest charting positions in Germany, Austria, Switzerland, and their native Canada.

Kataklysm released their fourteenth studio album, Unconquered, on September 25, 2020. Three weeks prior to the album's release, the band announced that drummer Oli Beaudoin had departed and was replaced by James Payne. The band continued touring Europe in 2023.

Their fifteenth album, Goliath, was released on August 11, 2023.

== Members ==
Kataklysm live at With Full Force 2018

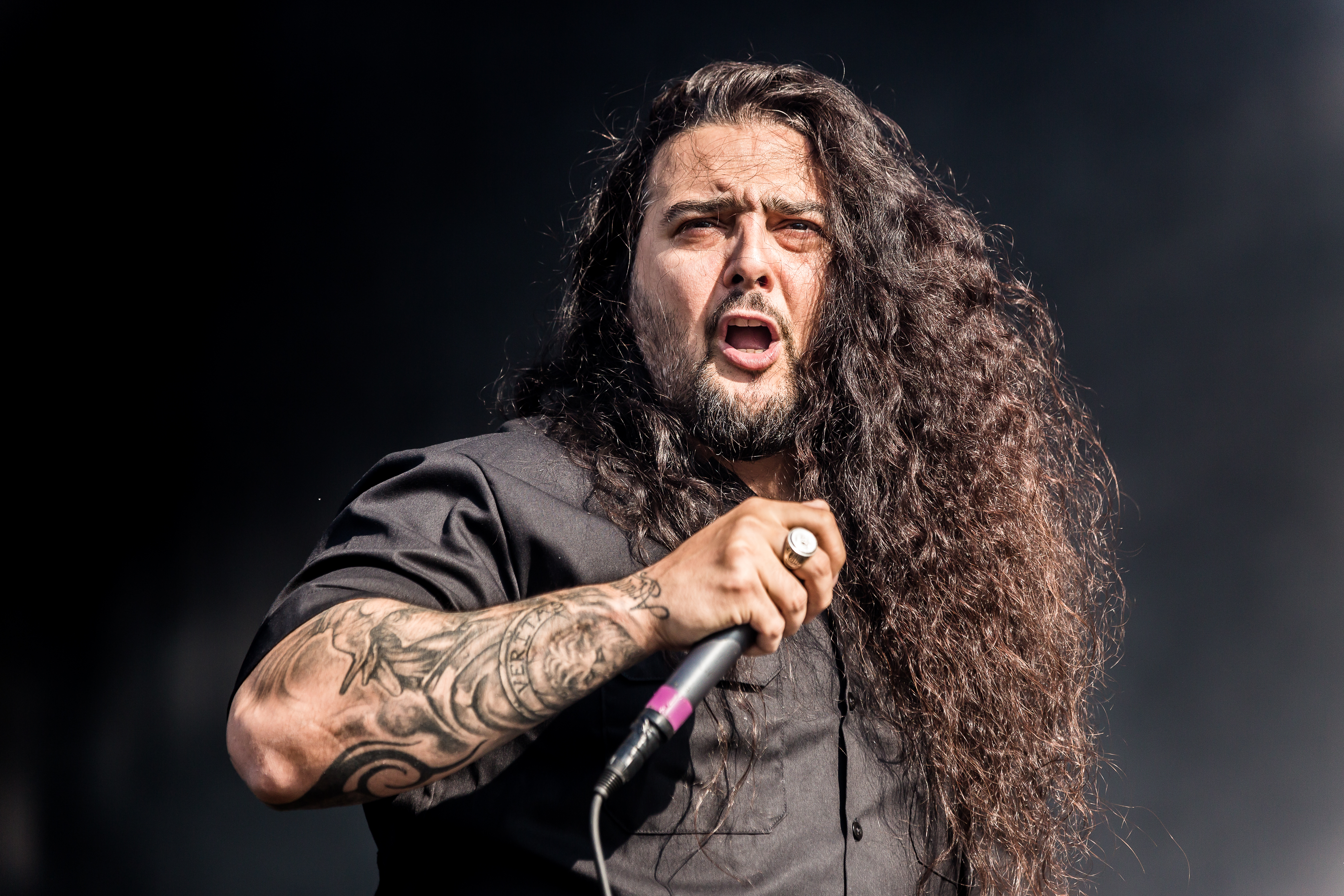
Maurizio Iacono

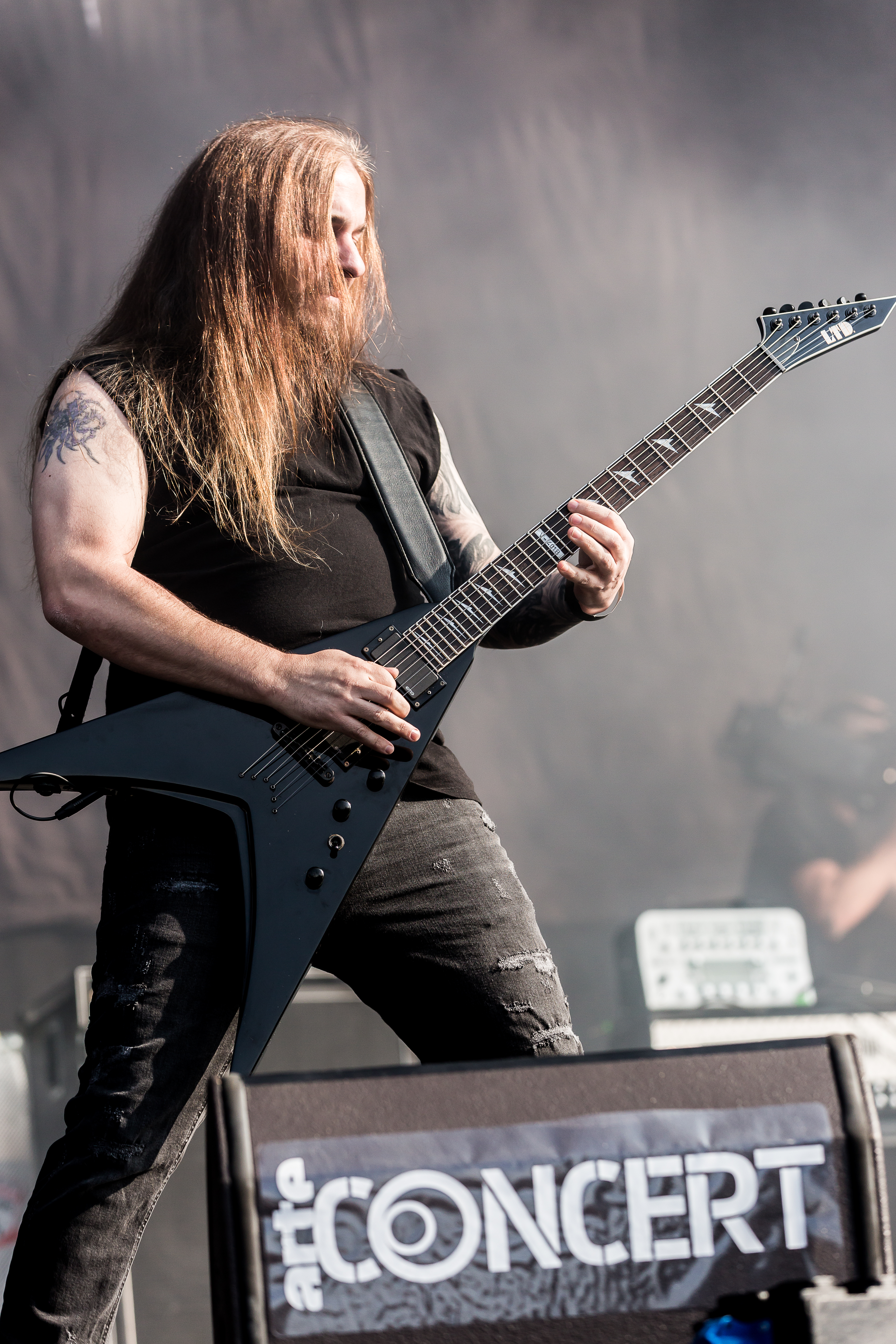
Jean-François Dagenais

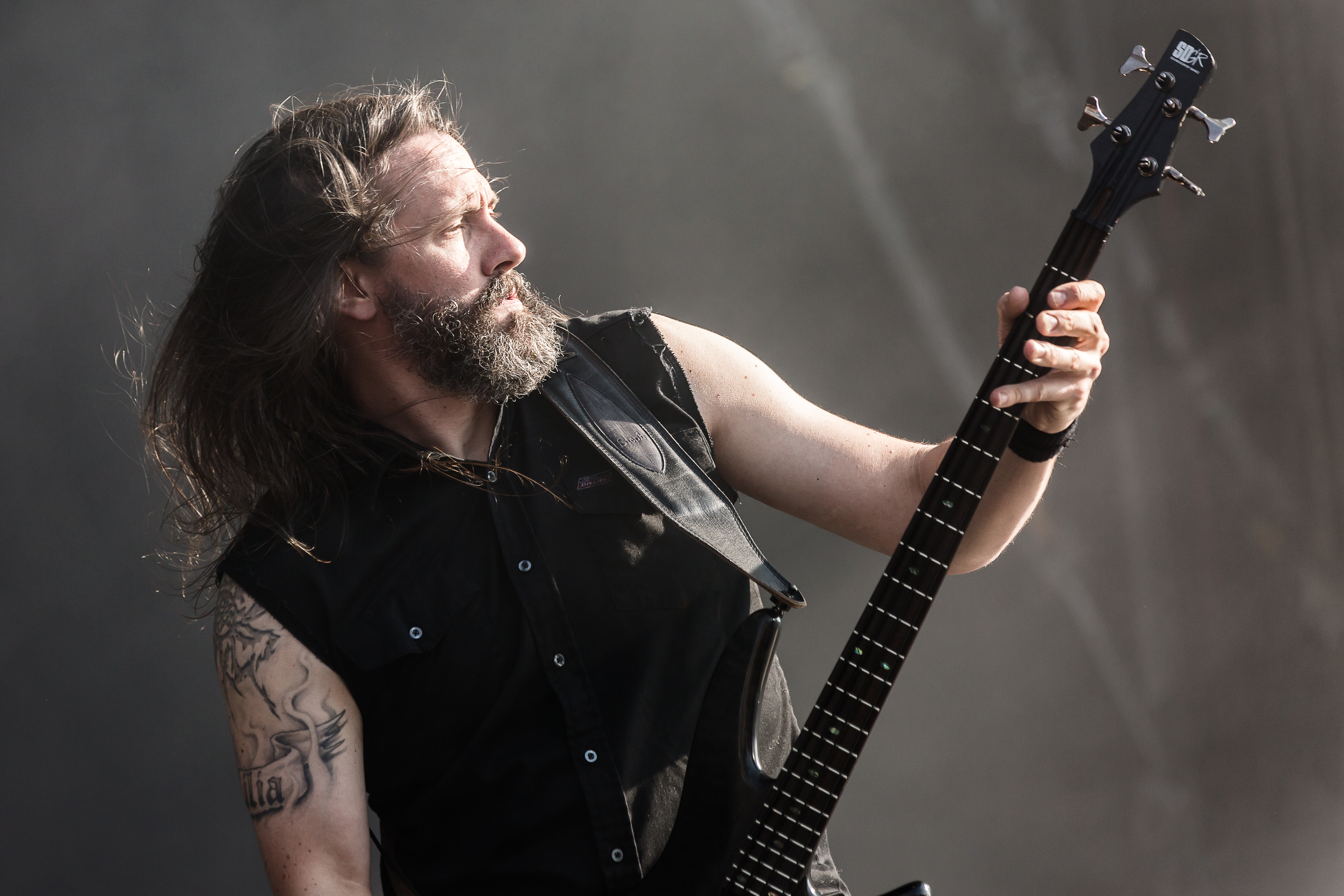
Stéphane Barbe

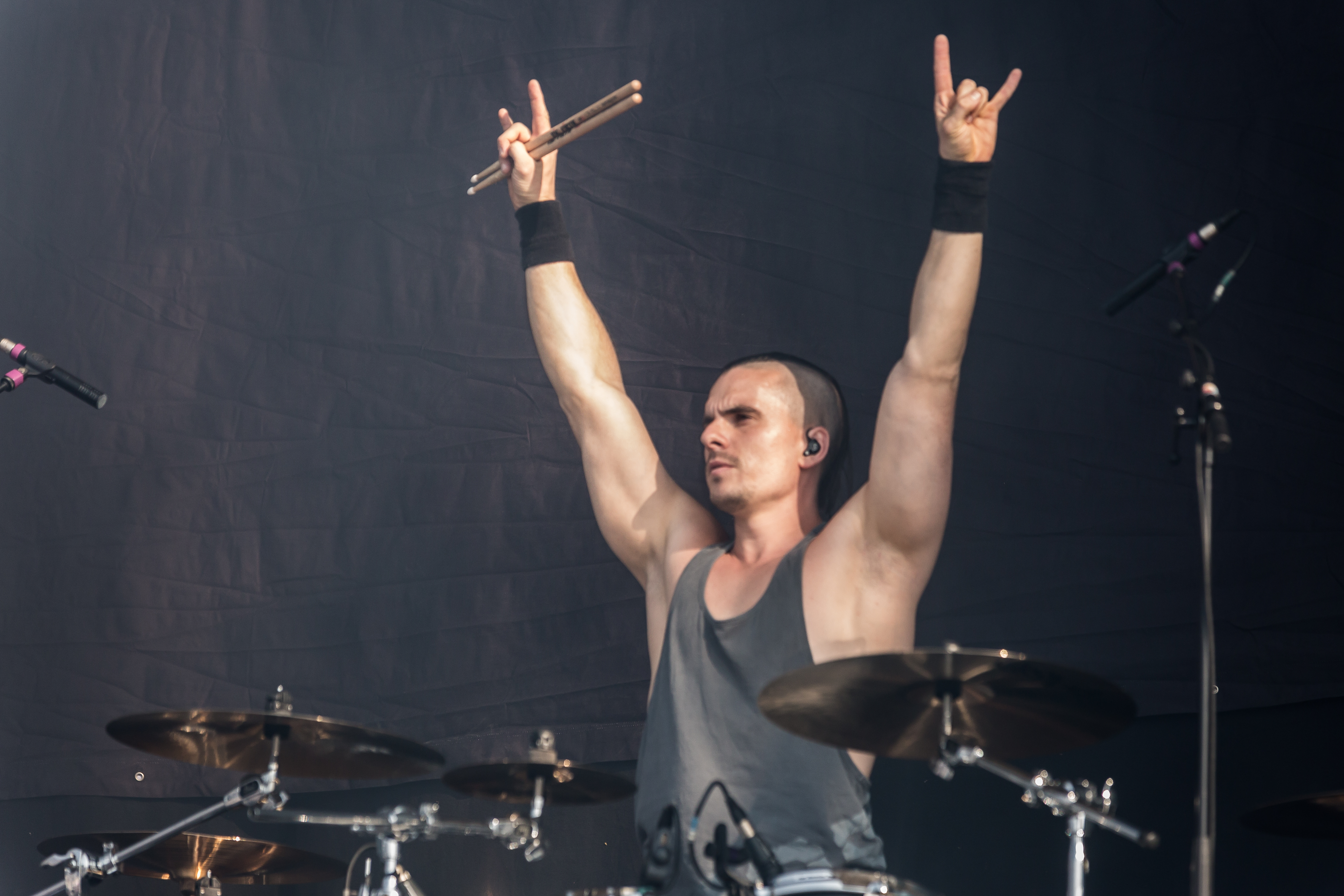
Oli Beaudoin

Current members

- Maurizio Iacono – vocals (1998–present), bass (1991–1998)
- Jean-François Dagenais – guitars (1991–present)
- Stephane Barbe – bass (1998–present)
- James Payne – drums (2020–present)

Former members

- Sylvain Houde – vocals (1991–1998)
- Stephane Côté – guitars (1991–1992)
- Ariel Saied Martinez – drums (1991–1992)
- Max Duhamel – drums (1993–1995, 1998–2002, 2005–2013)
- Nick Miller – drums (1996–1998)
- Martin Maurais – drums (2003–2005)
- Oli Beaudoin – drums (2013–2020)

Timeline

== Discography ==
- Sorcery (1995)
- Temple of Knowledge (1996)
- Victims of this Fallen World (1998)
- The Prophecy (Stigmata of the Immaculate) (2000)
- Epic: The Poetry of War (2001)
- Shadows & Dust (2002)
- Serenity in Fire (2004)
- In the Arms of Devastation (2006)
- Prevail (2008)
- Heaven's Venom (2010)
- Waiting for the End to Come (2013)
- Of Ghosts and Gods (2015)
- Meditations (2018)
- Unconquered (2020)
- Goliath (2023)

== Awards and nominations ==
Year	Organization	Award	Work or author awarded	Result
2005	Canadian Independent Music Awards	Favourite Metal Artist/Group	Kataklysm	Nominated
2006	Canadian Independent Music Awards	Favourite Metal Artist/Group	Kataklysm	Winner
2008	fr:Gala alternatif de la musique indépendante du Québec	Album Métal/Hardcore de l'année	Prevail	Nominated
2011	fr:Gala alternatif de la musique indépendante du Québec	Album Métal/Hardcore de l'année	Heaven's Venom	Nominated
2013	Canadian Independent Music Awards	Metal Band of the Year	Kataklysm	Winner
2015	Juno Awards	Metal/Hard Music Album of the Year	Waiting for the End to Come	Nominated
2015	Canadian Independent Music Awards	Metal/Hard Music Album of the Year	Waiting for the End to Come	Nominated
2016	Juno Awards	Heavy Metal Album of the Year	Of Ghosts and Gods	Winner
2021	Juno Awards	Heavy Metal Album of the Year	Unconquered	Nominated
2024	Juno Awards	Metal/Hard Music Album of the Year	Goliath	Nominated
