= Dystopia (Beneath the Massacre album) =

Studio album by Beneath the Massacre
- Released: October 28, 2008
- Recorded: Northern Studio
- Genres: Technical death metal, deathcore
- Length: 32:14
- Label: Prosthetic
- Producer: Yannick St-Amand

Beneath the Massacre chronology
Mechanics of Dysfunction (2007)	Dystopia (2008)	Incongruous (2012)

Professional ratings
Review scores
Source	Rating
About.com	3.5/5 stars
Chart Attack	1.5/5 stars
Lambgoat	(7/10)
Southcoast247	(unfavorable)
SMNNews	(6.5/10)

Dystopia is the second studio album by Canadian death metal band Beneath the Massacre. It was released on October 28, 2008 through Prosthetic Records.

The song "Never More" is a re-recorded version of the track of the same name found on their first EP, Evidence of Inequity.

== Musical and lyrical themes ==
"The songs are by far the weirdest, most intense songs we have ever written. It's great to finally listen to all the crazy ideas we had... After six weeks of intense tracking, we're also relieved that's it's all done. The writing process was hard and exhausting since we wrote most of it on the road, but we can now say that it worth it and we cannot wait to release the album and play the new songs on our upcoming tour."

— Elliot Desgagnés

== Promotion ==
On July 3, 2008, a message was posted on Beneath the Massacre's official website about the first in a series of in-studio videos featuring footage from Northern Studio.

On August 14, 2008, a message was posted in Beneath the Massacre's official website regarding the second video for the making of Dystopia, featuring bass and guitar recording sessions, and also a link to Prosthetic Records pre-order the album, currently available on CD and vinyl formats.

== Track listing ==
No.	Title	Length
1.	"Condemned"	4:20
2.	"Reign of Terror"	3:33
3.	"Our Common Grave"	3:43
4.	"Harvest of Hate"	3:15
5.	"The Wasteland"	3:38
6.	"Bitter"	2:45
7.	"No Future"	0:52
8.	"Lithium Overdose"	3:41
9.	"Never More"	3:43
10.	"Procreating the Infection"	2:44
Total length:		32:14

== Personnel ==
Beneath the Massacre

- Elliot Desgagnés − vocals
- Christopher Bradley − guitar
- Dennis Bradley − bass
- Justin Rousselle − drums

Productions

- Yannick St-Amand – producer
- Felix Rancourt – artwork
- Alan Douches – master
- Jason Suecof – mixer
