= The Unspoken King =

2008 studio album by Cryptopsy

Studio album by Cryptopsy
- Released: May 26, 2008
- Recorded: December 2007 – February 2008
- Studios: Garage Studio, Montreal
- Genre: Deathcore
- Length: 47:07
- Label: Century Media
- Producers: Christian Donaldson, Cryptopsy

Cryptopsy chronology
Once Was Not (2005)	The Unspoken King (2008)	Cryptopsy (2012)

The Unspoken King is the sixth studio album by Canadian death metal band Cryptopsy. The album was released on May 26, 2008 in Europe, and June 24, 2008 in the US by Century Media Records. It was the last album to feature guitarist Alex Auburn and bassist Eric Langlois. Keyboardist Maggie Durand was also removed from the band shortly after completion.

The Unspoken King is controversial for its deathcore sound, a huge departure from the technical death metal style the band had become known for over the previous decade. Because of this, the album garnered mostly negative reception from longtime fans. However, some critics praised the album.

== Background ==
The Unspoken King was originally to be called The Book of Suffering, and was to be a double album, but on April 23, 2007, Cryptopsy announced that lead vocalist Lord Worm had been fired from the band and they were looking for a replacement. Following this, Cryptopsy revealed the addition of vocalist Matt McGachy and keyboardist Maggie Durand. With these additions, the band's style incorporated more melodic elements and breakdowns, thus leading to a drastic, previously unexplored sound change.

During the album's recording sessions, a cover of Strapping Young Lad's "Oh My Fucking God" was recorded. A music video for the track "Worship Your Demons" debuted on MTV Headbangers Ball on June 14, 2008.

The then-new vocalist McGachy stated that he had trouble sleeping during the recording sessions of the album: "I would stay up lying in bed, rethinking all of the parts I had tracked, and was wondering if I was actually good enough to be in this band [...] But by the time we entered the mixing process, I saw the entire band singing along to my vocals, so I finally felt that I must have done something right."

McGachy remained with Cryptopsy following the record, however, synthesizer player Durand departed shortly before the album's release due to financial difficulties, thus leaving The Unspoken King the only album to include her.

== Musical style ==
Although The Unspoken King still carries their usual death metal sound, the shift in their style has been defined by the incorporation of metalcore elements such as breakdowns, clean singing vocals, hooks/choruses and keyboard accompaniments, as well as less of an emphasis on the time signature changes and polyrhythmic elements which thus lead to The Unspoken King to be widely considered a deathcore album.

The album is generally considered to be Cryptopsy's most eccentric and experimental release to date. It is also the only Cryptopsy album to feature clean vocals.

== Critical reception ==
Professional ratings
Review scores
Source	Rating
About.com	2.5/5 stars
AllMusic	2.5/5 stars
Chronicles of Chaos	8.5/10 stars
Grayowl Point	1.5/5 stars

Despite fan outcry against the band's change in sound, The Unspoken King ultimately received mixed reviews from critics with much of the positive remarks being awarded to Flo Mounier's drum performance. One critic remarked that the album "is an unsettling experience. It is literally like listening to a deathcore band trying and failing to replicate Whisper Supremacy", while Metal Storm claimed "the album shows flashes of the greatness that is mainly through Flo's [drumming] and the slight progressive touch that was also hinted on in the band's last album."

Canadian review site Grayowl Point was very critical of the album, accusing the band of abandoning technicality in favor for a more brutal sound. Reviewer Michael Rhombus went on to say "Believe it or not, the vast majority of metal fans couldn’t care less about brutality and are more concerned with musicianship. Matt McGeachy apparently thinks his audience are fourteen year olds jerking off looking for crunchy guitar noises and has for the most part ditched the abstract part of Cryptopsy."

Reviewer Kevin Stewart-Panko of Decibel gave some indifferent praise in a 2011 retrospective article about the record, stating that the opening track "'Worship Your Demons' is about as good a Cryptopsy album opener as there ever has been. It’s surprisingly catchy without sacrificing any technicality [...] However, when they conclude the typical Cryptopsy of [the song] 'Born Dead' [sic] with more singing and an anthemic, almost modern-rock chord workout, it seems more tacked-on than natural or flowing."

Chronicles of Chaos gave the album a positive review, praising the vocals and guitar riff performances while mildly shaming the six songs that contain clean vocal sections. They closed their review with "It may not sound like Blasphemy Made Flesh but I'd happily wager that if it did there would be another legion of nay-saying pantywaists complaining about that too."

== Track listing ==
All lyrics are written by Matt McGachy; all music is composed by Cryptopsy.

No.	Title	Length
1.	"Worship Your Demons"	2:12
2.	"The Headsmen"	5:14
3.	"Silence the Tyrants"	4:09
4.	"Bemoan the Martyr"	4:10
5.	"Leach"	4:48
6.	"The Plagued"	4:09
7.	"Resurgence of an Empire"	4:40
8.	"Anoint the Dead"	3:19
9.	"Contemplate Regicide"	5:29
10.	"Bound Dead"	6:26
11.	"(Exit) the Few"	2:31
Total length:		47:07

== Personnel ==
Cryptopsy

- Matt McGachy − lead vocals
- Alex Auburn − guitar, vocals
- Christian Donaldson – guitar
- Maggie Durand − keyboards, samples
- Eric Langlois − bass
- Flo Mounier − drums

Additional Personnel

- Gabriel McCaughry – vocals ("Anoint the Dead")
- Youri Raymond – vocals ("Leach")
- Christian Donaldson – production, mixing
- Jeff Fortin – re-amping
- Bernard Belley – mastering
