= Daniel Mongrain =

Canadian musician

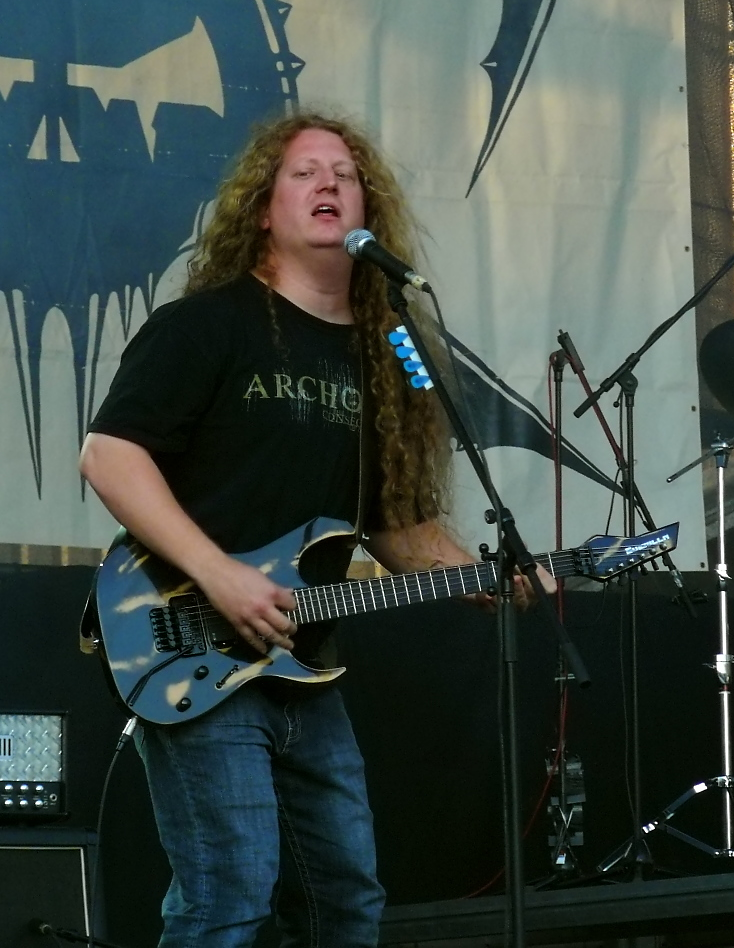

Background information
- Born: July 4, 1976 (age 50); Trois-Rivières, Quebec, Canada
- Genres: Technical death metal, progressive metal, progressive rock
- Occupations: Musician, songwriter
- Instruments: Guitars, vocals
- Label: Century Media
- Member of: Voivod, Martyr
- Formerly of: Cryptopsy, Gorguts, Capharnaum

Daniel Mongrain (born July 4, 1976), also known as Chewy, is a Canadian musician, known as a co-founder of the Quebec technical death metal band Martyr, in which he composes, sings and plays guitar. Mongrain is also currently guitarist for the Canadian thrash/progressive metal band Voivod since 2008, replacing late guitarist Denis D'Amour.

Before joining Voivod, Mongrain also joined a number of established technical death metal bands. He joined Gorguts in 1999 after the release of Obscura, toured for the album and recorded From Wisdom To Hate. He joined the band Capharnaum in 2003 and recorded their album Fractured, then he joined Cryptopsy in 2004 as a touring guitarist, filling in for Jon Levasseur. Around the same time he also played in Alcoholica, a Metallica tribute band from Quebec.

In addition to the metal genre, Mongrain plays guitar with several Quebec artists including Dan Bigras, Breen Leboeuf, Bruno Pelletier for the musical Dracula - Entre l'amour et la mort among others and played with more than 80 different formations, bands in numerous genres from Blues to rock to hip-hop to prog to metal, etc. His latest cover band project is a tribute band to progressive music from the 1970s called Jurassik Rock.

Mongrain has a bachelor's degree in Jazz Interpretation at University of Montreal and teaches jazz and pop guitar and theory courses at the Cégep régional de Lanaudière, Joliette Campus.

Mongrain is vegetarian.

In 2020, Mongrain contributed guitar to Big Scenic Nowhere's Lavender Blues EP.

== Equipment ==
=== Guitars ===
- Bond instruments guitars
- Guerilla Guitars
- Jackson Warrior
- Liberatore custom guitar, based on Jackson Warrior
- Ibanez Rocket Roll
- Gibson Explorer

=== Amps ===
- Marshall JCM800
- Mesa/Boogie Dual Rectifier/Mark V

== Discography ==
=== With Martyr ===
- Ostrogoth (1995) (Independent)
- Hopeless Hopes (1997) Re-release (Galy Records)
- Warp Zone (2000) (Warfare Records)
- Extracting the Core (2001) (Galy Records)
- Feeding the Abscess (2006) (Galy Records)
- Havoc in Quebec City DVD (2008) (Galy Records)

=== With Gorguts ===
- From Wisdom to Hate (2001)

=== With Capharnaum ===
- Fractured (2004)

=== With Voivod ===
- Tatsumaki (Live in Japan DVD) (2009)
- Warriors of Ice (Live in Mtl) (2011)
- Target Earth (2013)
- Post Society (2016)
- The Wake (2018)
- Synchro Anarchy (2022)
