= Quiet World (album) =

Studio album by Native Construct
- Released: April 17, 2015 (Austria, Czechia, Germany); April 20, 2015 (rest of Europe); April 21, 2015 (worldwide)
- Recorded: 2011–2013
- Genre: Progressive metal
- Length: 48:05
- Label: Metal Blade

Singles from Quiet World
- 1. "The Spark of the Archon" Released: March 30, 2015; 2. "Mute" Released: November 25, 2015

Quiet World is the debut and, as of 2026, only studio album by American progressive metal band Native Construct, released on April 21, 2015, via Metal Blade.

Two singles were released from the album, each with an accompanying video: "The Spark of the Archon", on March 30; and "Mute", on November 25.

== Background and recording ==
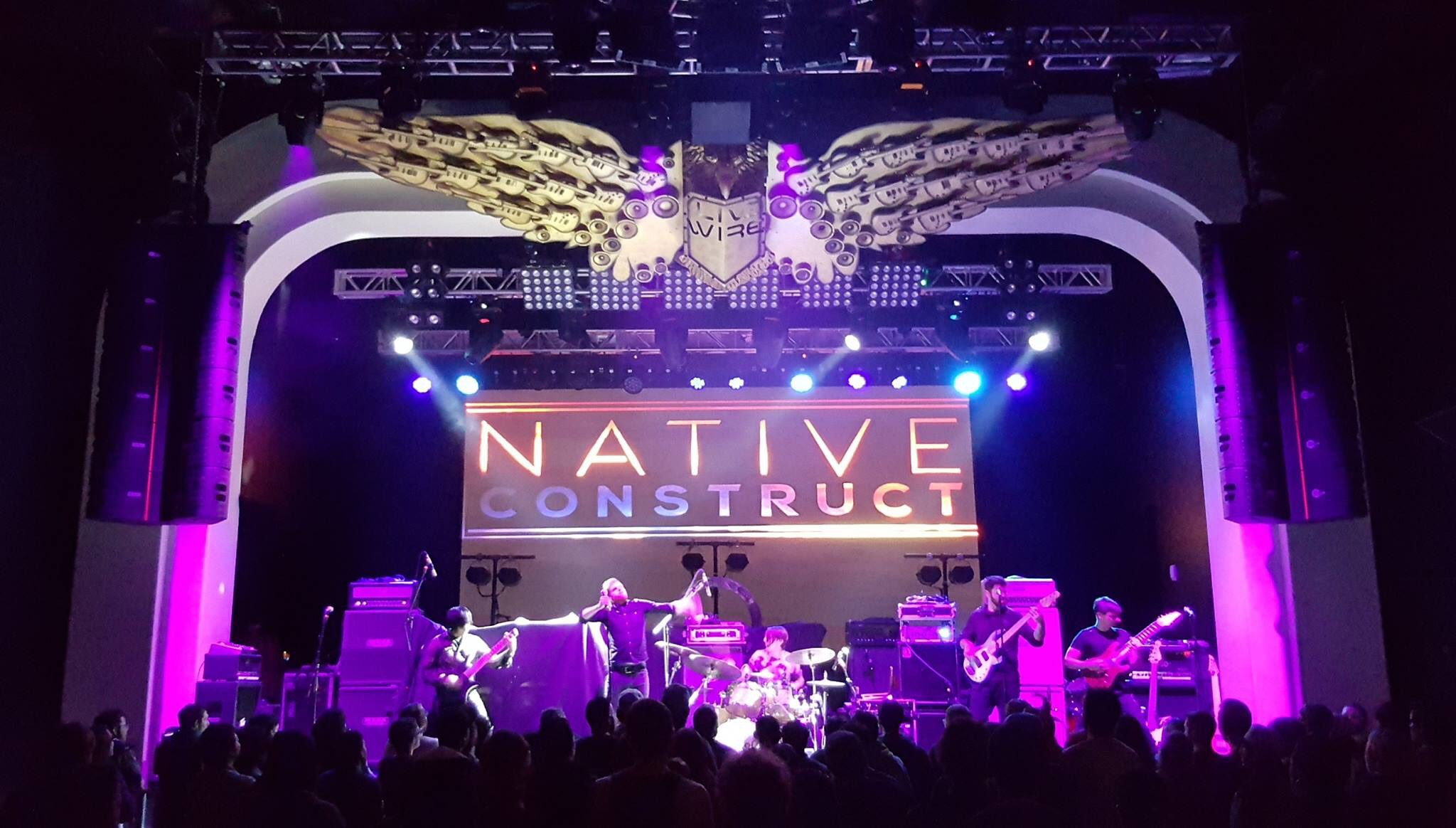
Native Construct live in 2017.

The three members of Native Construct (vocalist Robert Edens, guitarist Myles Yang and bassist Max Harchik) met at the Berklee College of Music in Boston, founded the group in 2011 after a number of jam sessions and wrote the album over the course of their studies there, as time allowed. Their place of birth led to comparisons with Dream Theater, another progressive metal band founded by a trio of Berklee alumni.

The album was recorded using programmed drums and orchestrations. The vocals were recorded in North Carolina, while all other instruments were recorded in the members' home studios.

The artwork was done by Mario Sánchez Nevado, who worked closely with the band "to make sure every bit of the imagery was representative of the story we're telling. We wanted to give our audience the opportunity to search for and find meaning in each detail of the artwork."

With help from Tommy Rogers, who heard their music while vocals were being recorded in North Carolina, the album was sent to some labels and caught Metal Blade's attention.

== Themes and musical style ==
According to vocalist Robert Edens, Quiet World is a concept album about a man who feels rejected and ignored and creates his own fantasy world that is his to control. Bassist Max Harchik further explained that the man, who is mute, is rejected by a girl he loves, and as a consequence he creates his own world "where no one is an outcast like he was, where everyone is sectioned off into their own groups of similar people, a much quieter world. The rest of the album covers the people of this world and their struggles against powers that keep them". It was written around the song "Chromatic Aberration", which the members had written years before.

The Prog Report described Native Construct as "Queen meets Between the Buried and Me or Dream Theater meets Beethoven" while PopMatters compared them favorably to BTBAM, Devin Townsend and uneXpect, describing their debut as possessing elements of jazz, musical theater and symphonic prog).

The band cites musical theater, heavy metal, progressive rock, classical music, jazz, BTBAM, The Beatles, Danny Elfman and Maurice Ravel as influences.

== Follow-up ==
By the time of the album release, guitarist Myles Yang said they wanted to start writing a second effort. In 2019, however, the band posted on their official Facebook page that they were on indefinite hiatus.

== Critical reception ==
Professional ratings
Review scores
Source	Rating
Metal.de	6/10
Prog	0/5 stars
Rebel Noise	5/5
Metal Hammer	3.5/5 stars

The album received generally favorable reviews from critics. Writing for Prog, Dom Lawson said Quiet World "contains plenty of familiar tropes to keep more traditionally-minded prog metal fans happy. But it also suggests that this band have gleefully embraced everything that the modern scene has to offer, from the scattershot arrangements and mischievous pomp of Haken through to the off-kilter extremity of Between The Buried And Me." He considered it "an album assembled from gloriously executed songs" and said the members "exhibit an intuitive grasp of the difference between self-indulgence and the maximisation of musical assets". He concluded by saying that the band had "a bright and limitless future ahead of them".

His Future plc peer Dave Ling, at Metal Hammer, said "the music is loud, colourful, intricate and smart" while also praising Rich Mouser's mixing work.

An unsigned review at Metal Injection called Quiet World "uniquely amazing" and "a lot to accept initially, but the structure and transitions are seamless". The instrumentation was considered "astounding at some points". The writer called Native Construct "one of the most tactful bands I have heard in a while. There is not a single moment where your left guessing, or attempting to digest what just occurred". They concluded by saying that the album "has nailed it".

On Rebel Noise, Jordan Blodum said "Native Construct has crafted a relentlessly varied, luscious, vibrant, and intricate gem that rivals anything being produced by their peers". He called the album "a masterpiece, plain and simple", reflected that "it would be an astounding accomplishment for any band at any time, so the fact that it's the first effort by a brand new outfit makes it even more remarkable" and concluded by saying that it is "the breath of fresh air progressive metal has needed for several years".

In a less favorable review for Metal.de, Michael though that Quiet World "truly feels like the wild fantasy of an introspective soul, which manifests itself in the music's vibrancy, versatility, and unpredictability". However, he detected "several issues", including a production that he deemed "far too sterile for such a vibrant album", the usage of synthesized drums and strings, and the attempt to "do too much at once. While the individual influences are virtuously showcased, they never truly coexist, but rather exist side by side. This makes the album feel very fragmented and – in its weaker moments – unfinished." He nevertheless concluded that the band delivered "a solid debut" and that they could be a new "force in the prog scene" if they solve what he perceived as faults.

In a retrospective review published on Everything Is Noise ten years after the album release, Dominik Böhmer said that the release "feels both written by students, with its relentless ambition and a theatrical grandiosity only born by youthful optimism, but also by masters – it is emotional, memorable, and mature at the same time" and that it "embraces a scope and execution [...] that few progressive acts accomplish, even with substantially larger discographies."

The album was ranked #3 at the Prog Report list of "Top 15 Prog Albums of 2015" and was also among the list of Best Progressive Rock/Metal of 2015 by PopMatters.

== Track listing ==
Quiet World track listing
No.	Title	Length
1.	"Mute"	6:21
2.	"The Spark of the Archon"	8:50
3.	"Passage"	8:07
4.	"Your Familiar Face"	4:11
5.	"Come Hell or High Water"	5:54
6.	"Chromatic Lights"	2:14
7.	"Chromatic Aberration"	12:28
Total length:		48:05

== Personnel ==
Per Ghost Cult Magazine

- Robert Edens — vocals
- Myles Yang — guitar, drum programming
- Max Harchik — bass
- Jamie King — vocals recording, mastering
- Rich Mouser — mixing
- Mario Sánchez Nevado — artwork
