= Cryptopsy =

Canadian death metal band

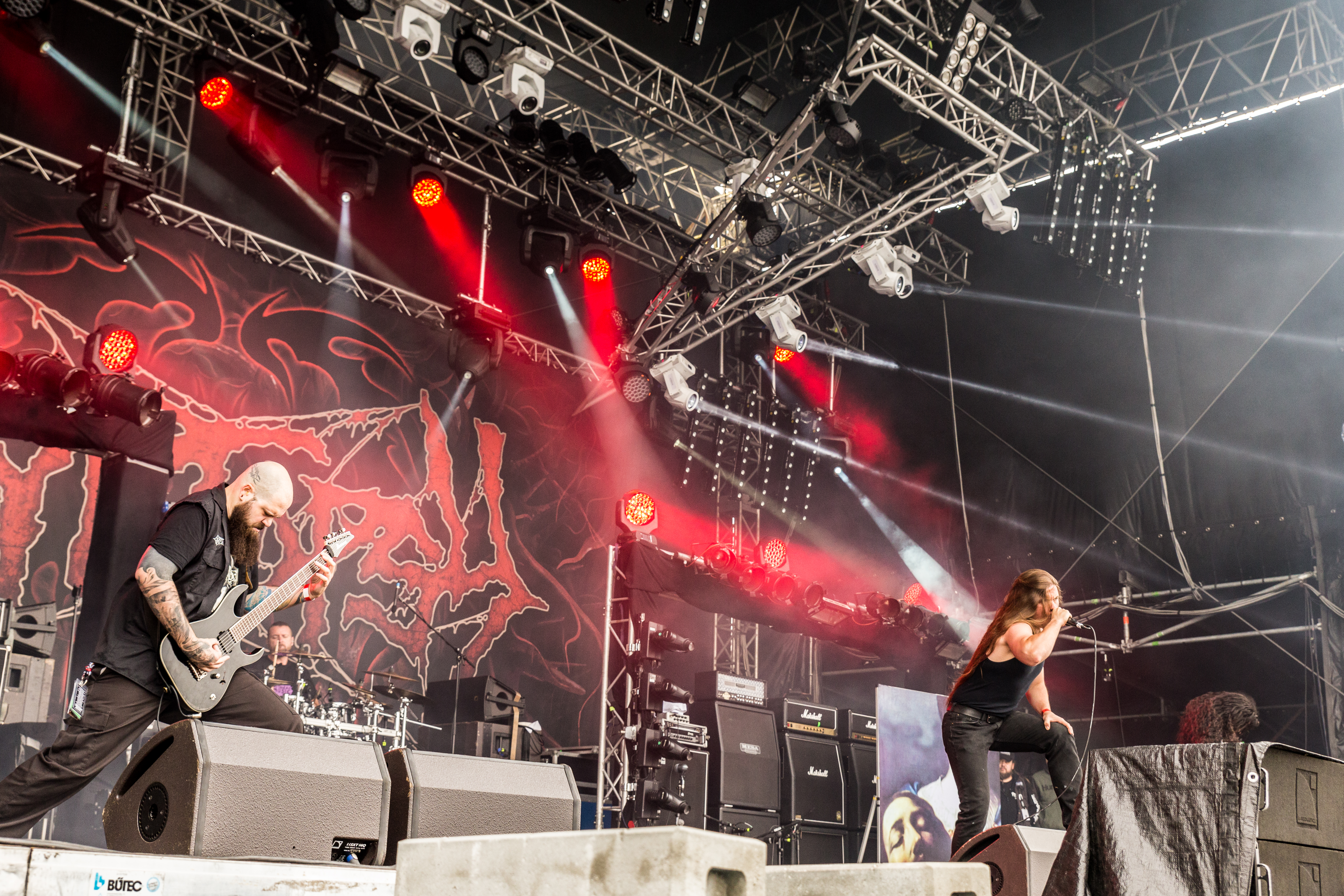
- Performing at 2017's Party.San Metal Open Air festival in Germany.

Background information
- Origin: Montreal, Quebec, Canada
- Genres: Technical death metal, brutal death metal
- Years active: 1992–present
- Labels: Century Media; Regain; Displeased; Nuclear Blast; Season of Mist
- Members: Flo Mounier; Christian Donaldson; Matt McGachy; Olivier Pinard
- Past members: Mike Atkin; John Todds; Steve Thibault; Lord Worm; Dave Galea; Kevin Weagle; Jon Levasseur; Martin Fergusson; Miguel Roy; Eric Langlois; Mike DiSalvo; Alex Auburn; Martin Lacroix; Daniel Mongrain; Maggy Durand; Youri Raymond; Dominic Grimard
- Website: cryptopsy.ca

Cryptopsy is a Canadian death metal band from Montreal. Founded in 1992, the band initially consisted of drummer Mike Atkin, guitarist Steve Thibault, and vocalist Dan "Lord Worm" Greening. An earlier incarnation of the band started in 1988 as Obsessive Compulsive Disorder, releasing numerous demos before disbanding and regrouping with a new lineup as Cryptopsy, debuting with a demo tape titled Ungentle Exhumation (1993).

Cryptopsy's debut album, Blasphemy Made Flesh was released the following year, followed by their second album, None So Vile (1996), which is regarded as an influential cult classic in the death metal underground. To date, the band have released nine albums, two EPs, and a live album. Cryptopsy is also notably the first ever foreign metal band to have performed live in Saudi Arabia, which occurred in December 2023, beating Metallica who played the country later that same month.

== History ==
=== Pre-Cryptopsy days and early years (1988–1994) ===
Canadian death/thrash metal band Obsessive Compulsive Disorder (O.C.D.) was formed in April 1988 by drummer Mike Atkin, guitarist Steve Thibault and vocalist Dan "Lord Worm" Greening, later renaming to Necrosis. John Todds later joined on bass. The band released several demos, including Mastication and Heterodontism (1989) and Realms of Pathogenia (1991). Mike Atkin announced his departure in the summer of 1991, after which the band was considered to be finished.

In October 1991, Dave Galea (ex guitarist of Montreal industrial metal band Reactor) and Steve Thibault decided to collaborate on a new band. The new lineup initially consisted of Steve Thibault on rhythm guitar and Dave Galea on lead guitar, vocalist Dan "Lord Worm' Greening and John Todds on bass (both of Necrosis). A friend of John Todds', drummer Flo Mounier, agreed to sit in temporarily until a permanent drummer could be found. At the time, Mounier did not play extreme metal but quickly began to adopt this style into his playing and decided to join full time in November 1991. A few gigs were played locally under the name Necrosis, the set comprising a mix of remaining Necrosis tracks and new originals written by Galea and Thibault, with arrangements by Mounier. A demo was recorded in January 1992 still using the name Necrosis, this being the black demo with a new logo. Soon afterwards, John Todds decided to leave, citing family obligations.

During the spring and summer of 1992, several songs were written by Galea and Thibault that would later comprise the majority of the tracks on their first full-length release Blasphemy Made Flesh. During the month of September 1992, it was decided that a new name was required owing to the radical change of style and the incorporation of drop tuning to B standard. The first choice, Gomorrah, only lasted two weeks until Lord Worm invented the name Cryptopsy. Soon afterwards Flo Mounier designed the now well-known logo.

The months-long search for a bass player finally resulted in Kevin Weagle joining the lineup. Shows were then played around Quebec and the Eastern U.S. after which plans were made to record a professional demo. Engineer Rod Shearer was hired to record the band in early 1993, culminating in the first official Cryptopsy release, Ungentle Exhumation in April 1993. The rest of 1993 was spent playing gigs and writing more tracks, some of which would feature on future Cryptopsy releases. In early 1994, Dave Galea left the band to pursue higher education, to be replaced by Jon Levasseur.

=== Ungentle Exhumation and Blasphemy Made Flesh (1993–1995) ===
In 1993, Cryptopsy released their debut demo, Ungentle Exhumation. This demo caught the attention of local label Gore Records, which re-released the demo and, for a brief period, managed the band. The demo garnered attention in the Canadian death metal underground, as well as from the German label Invasion Records.

By 1994, bassist Kevin Weagle had been replaced by Martin Fergusson, and Dave Galea was replaced by lead guitarist Jon Levasseur. This line-up recorded their debut album, Blasphemy Made Flesh, which at first was independently released and later licensed to Germany's Invasion Records. The album gained them a wide following in the Canadian underground.

Due to the dissolution of Invasion Records, Cryptopsy was left without a label to support their tour, but the album would be picked up by Dutch label Displeased Records. After successfully touring in support of Blasphemy Made Flesh, Steve Thibault resigned from his role on guitar and went on to be the band's manager. Bassist Martin Fergusson was replaced by Eric Langlois. The addition of Langlois incorporated funk-style bass slaps into the Cryptopsy sound.

=== None So Vile (1996–1997) ===
In 1996, the line-up of Worm, Mounier, Levasseur, and Langlois released the album None So Vile on the Swedish label Wrong Again Records. By this time, Levasseur was a very prominent songwriter in the band. His guitar leads consisted of very fast yet complex shreds, which were usually played in short bursts. Although Levasseur handled all the guitar parts on the album, the band would add Miguel Roy as a second touring guitarist.

In 1997, after the tour in support of None So Vile, Lord Worm left the band, citing both health and financial issues and started a new career as an English as a second language teacher for adults.

=== Whisper Supremacy (1998–1999) ===
The band hired the Boston native Mike DiSalvo, vocalist of death metal band Infestation and a long time friend of the band, after Lord Worm approved his hiring. In July 1997, Cryptopsy's appearance at the Milwaukee Metalfest XI gained the attention of many American metalheads, as well as that of the label Century Media.

Cryptopsy's next album, Whisper Supremacy, was released on Century Media in 1998, and featured Miguel Roy on second guitar. It took Cryptopsy's style further, incorporating some jazz and fusion elements. Some fans criticized the vocals of Mike DiSalvo, stating his style was too resminiscent of hardcore rather than the typical extreme metal vocalizations of Lord Worm. The tour in support of Whisper Supremacy took the band on their first tour through the United States, increasing their fan-base.

=== …And Then You'll Beg (2000–2002) ===
Cryptopsy released their fourth studio effort, …And Then You'll Beg, in 2000. The album featured a new guitarist, Alex Auburn, who replaced Miguel Roy. And Then You'll Beg was considered not-as-heavy as Cryptopsy's previous albums, but embraced further experimentations when compared to previous releases. After the first portion of the supporting tour, Mike DiSalvo departed the band. Martin LaCroix took over the position as singer for the European and Japanese tours. His style was viewed as being in between the styles of Lord Worm and Mike DiSalvo.

=== None So Live (2002–2004) ===
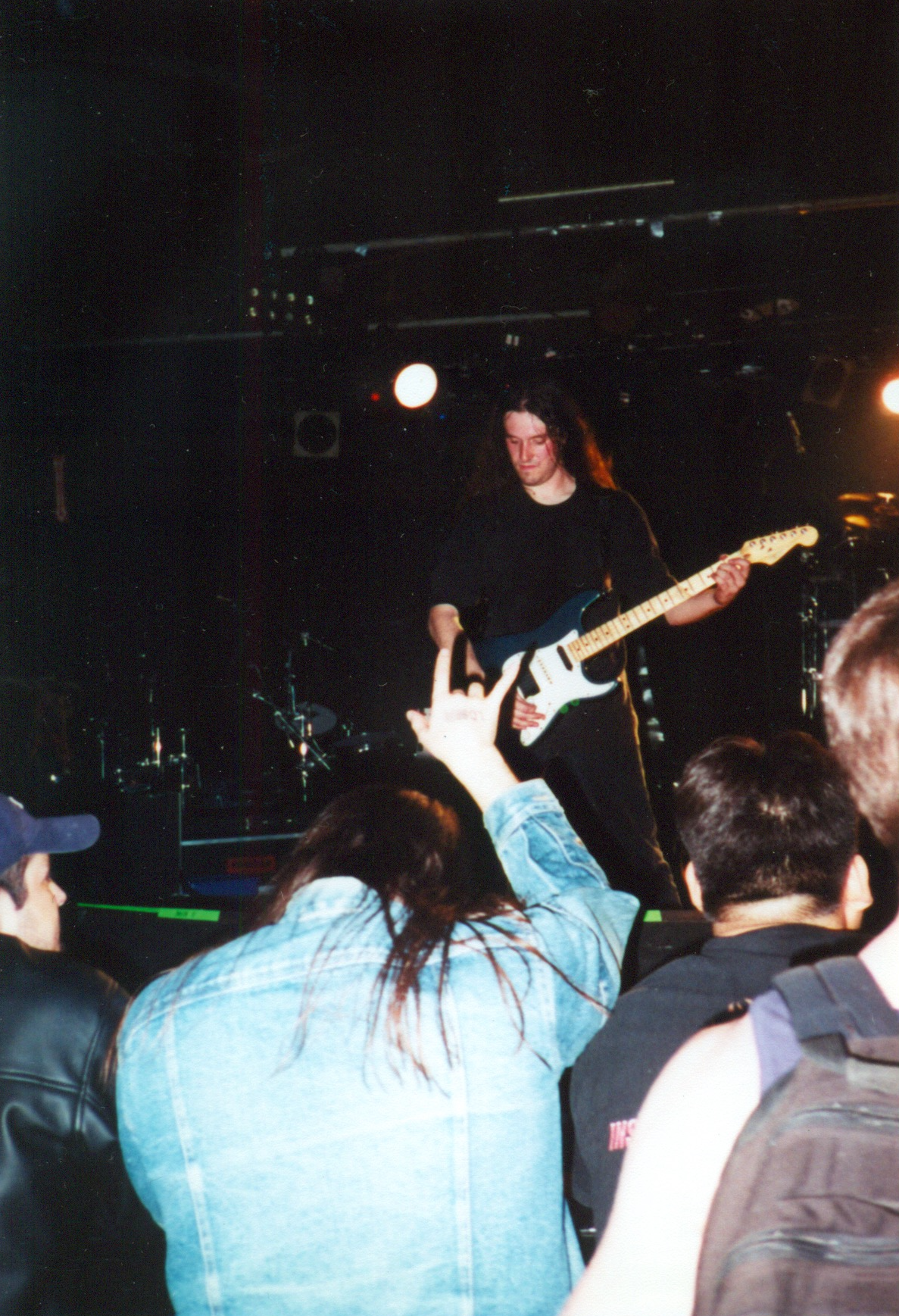
Founding guitarist Jon Levasseur (pictured in 2003) has received significant recognition for his distinctive and technically complex approach to songwriting and playing style.

In June 2001, Cryptopsy played their first concert in their hometown of Montreal in four years and attracted an audience of more than 2,000. The concert was recorded and, in 2003, released as a live album, None So Live. This release was LaCroix's only contribution to Cryptopsy's discography; he was not fluent enough in English to write lyrics on the same level as his predecessors.

Through summer 2004, Cryptopsy played shows in the Montreal area, and began a full Canadian tour in September, with former guitarist Miguel Roy filling in for the unavailable Jon Levasseur. In October, Martyr and former Gorguts guitarist Dan Mongrain took over second guitar duties for the live dates. The setlist for this tour began with the entire None So Vile album, followed by songs from Blasphemy Made Flesh and Whisper Supremacy. The Canada 2004 tour ended at Cryptopsy's performance on November 6 at the Trois-Rivieres Metalfest IV, which was filmed for a live DVD. The DVD Live at Trois-Rivieres Metalfest IV was released independently in 2005. The band sold the DVD at gigs.

=== Once Was Not (2005–2006) ===
After not being available for said tour, on January 31, 2005, Jon Levasseur announced that he had lost interest in extreme music and amicably departed Cryptopsy. Dan Mongrain remained on guitar duties for the Back to the Worms tour through the United States from February to May. After the tour's completion Mongrain also departed in order to continue his work with Martyr and eventually join Voivod. It was then announced that Cryptopsy's next album, Once Was Not, would be released on October 18, 2005.

The album features original vocalist Lord Worm, Flo Mounier, Eric Langlois, and Alex Auburn handling all guitar duties except the intro track "Luminum". On September 28 it was announced that the new touring guitarist would be Christian Donaldson of Mythosis. The album showed a heightened eccentric experimentation of the band's songwriting, introducing some slight elements of avant-garde, mathcore and Spanish classical guitar into their death metal sound. The band toured North America with Suffocation, Despised Icon, and Aborted. After a break, and the release of Flo Mounier's instructional drumming DVD Extreme Metal Drumming 101, the band toured Europe with Grave, Aborted, Dew-Scented, and others, then toured America and Australia. Following their second tour of Europe, UK, and Scandinavia, guitarist Christian Donaldson became a permanent member of the band.

=== The Unspoken King (2007–2011) ===
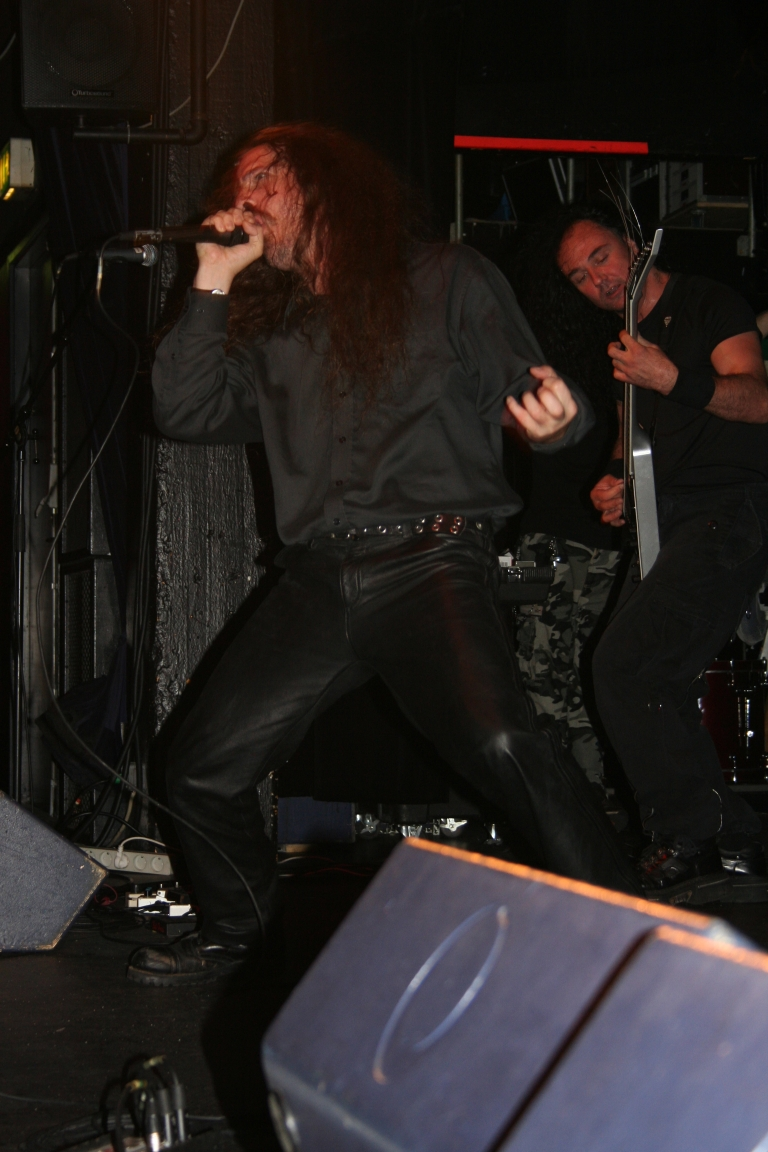
Once Was Not (2005) is original vocalist Lord Worm's final album with the band. He departed shortly before The Unspoken King (2008) was conceptualized.

In 2007 Cryptopsy had announced plans for their sixth studio album, however after this announcement Lord Worm stated that he left the group earlier than planned for health reasons and the dislike for touring, which contradicted the band's statement that he was kicked out. Lord Worm further stated that there were creative differences with the other band members over the direction the band would eventually take on their subsequent studio outing, and subsequently claimed that his 2003 re-joining of the band was out of monetary interest. On April 23, 2007, Cryptopsy announced that they were looking for a new vocalist.

The new album was originally to be called The Book of Suffering, and was to be a double album, this plan ended up being canceled, but the band would eventually pursue this concept several years later by releasing two EP's titled The Book of Suffering (subtitled as Tome I and Tome II in 2015 and 2018 respectively).

On December 4, 2007, Cryptopsy revealed the addition of vocalist Matt McGachy, who joined the band on the day he turned 24. Keyboard player, Maggy Durand was also inducted as a part of Cryptopsy. The band released The Unspoken King on June 24, 2008. This album saw the inclusion of previously-unheard elements such as melodic riffs, relatively sterile production and even clean vocals and has been widely regarded as being a deathcore release instead of the band's usual technical death metal style. The Unspoken King was met with mostly negative reception by fans but mixed reception by critics. The band's reaction was to open the shows of the following tour with "Dinner Time", a skit mocking fans who disliked the album's direction.

Due to financial difficulties, keyboardist Durand left Cryptopsy shortly before The Unspoken King's release, leaving the album the only one to include her—she never performed live during her short time in the band. In early February 2009, guitarist Alex Auburn also announced his departure from the band, saying that there were numerous reasons for his leaving, and that he and the rest of the band agreed with the departure.

=== Self-titled album and The Book of Suffering EPs (2011–2022) ===
On May 25, 2011, the band announced on their Facebook page that former lead guitarist and major contributor Jon Levasseur had returned to the band. Additionally, bassist Eric Langlois decided to take a break from Cryptopsy, and Youri Raymond took his place on bass. On December 9, 2011, Raymond announced his departure from the band. On January 15, 2012, Cryptopsy announced that Olivier Pinard, from Neuraxis and Vengeful, would be the new bassist.

On September 14, 2012, Cryptopsy released Cryptopsy, which turned away from the experimentation witnessed on The Unspoken King, in favour of a more technical death metal sound, closer to their older sound.

On May 8, 2015, it was announced that Cryptopsy would release The Book of Suffering - Tome I in mid-2015, the first in a series of EPs. An Indiegogo campaign was launched the same day. Regarding the recording process, it was stated that Jason Suecof would handle mixing duties, while Alan Douches would handle the mastering process.

On August 31, 2018, the band announced the second part of The Book of Suffering on their Facebook page. Pre-sales of the EP began on September 7 along with a music video of their new song "Sire of Sin", which was to appear on Tome II. The EP was released on October 26.

=== As Gomorrah Burns and An Insatiable Violence (2023–present) ===
On May 8, 2023, Cryptopsy announced that they signed with Nuclear Blast Records and revealed the art and details of their eighth album entitled As Gomorrah Burns, the band's first full-length in 11 years. It was released on September 8, 2023. The album was the album of the month on Metallian.com. The band began touring in support of the album upon its release.

Cryptopsy, in December 2023, performed a show in Riyadh, Saudi Arabia, the performance was the first time a metal band from the Western Hemisphere had ever played in the country.

In June 2025, Cryptopsy released their ninth studio album, An Insatiable Violence, through Season of Mist. The album received widespread critical acclaim, with outlets such as Decibel, Blabbermouth, and Lambgoat praising its technical brutality and modernized sound.

Cryptopsy toured Europe in early 2026. It was later announced that the band would headline the 2026 Decibel Tour in North America with support from Fulci, Necrot and Blood Monolith. This tour is in celebration of the 30th anniversary of None So Vile.

== Musical style ==
Categorized as both technical death metal and brutal death metal, Cryptopsy's music is described as having an "oppressive atmosphere" and a "grimier" approach to technical songwriting. Daniel Gioffre of AllMusic describes the band's style of death metal as having "sacrificed" melody, harmony, rhythmic clarity and song structure in pursuit of "one overriding goal [...] extreme brutality." James Christopher Monger of AllMusic made note of Cryptopsy's "uncompromising sonic attack" and "technical acuity". According to Albert Mudrian in the book Choosing Death, "Crypotopsy added complex twists and turns into their arrangements that would even challenge accomplished jazz musicians." Gioffre characterizes the band's music by "about-to-fall-off-the-edge playing." Cryptopsy drummer Flo Mounier has been called "one of the fastest drummers to play death metal," and is known for his "eccentric" accents with his cymbal work. Graham Hartmann of Loudwire wrote: "Foregoing any trace of enunciation, Lord Worm becomes increasingly unhinged with every passing word and attempting to follow along with a lyric sheet is utterly futile."

== Band members ==
Cryptopsy live at Party.San Metal Open Air 2017

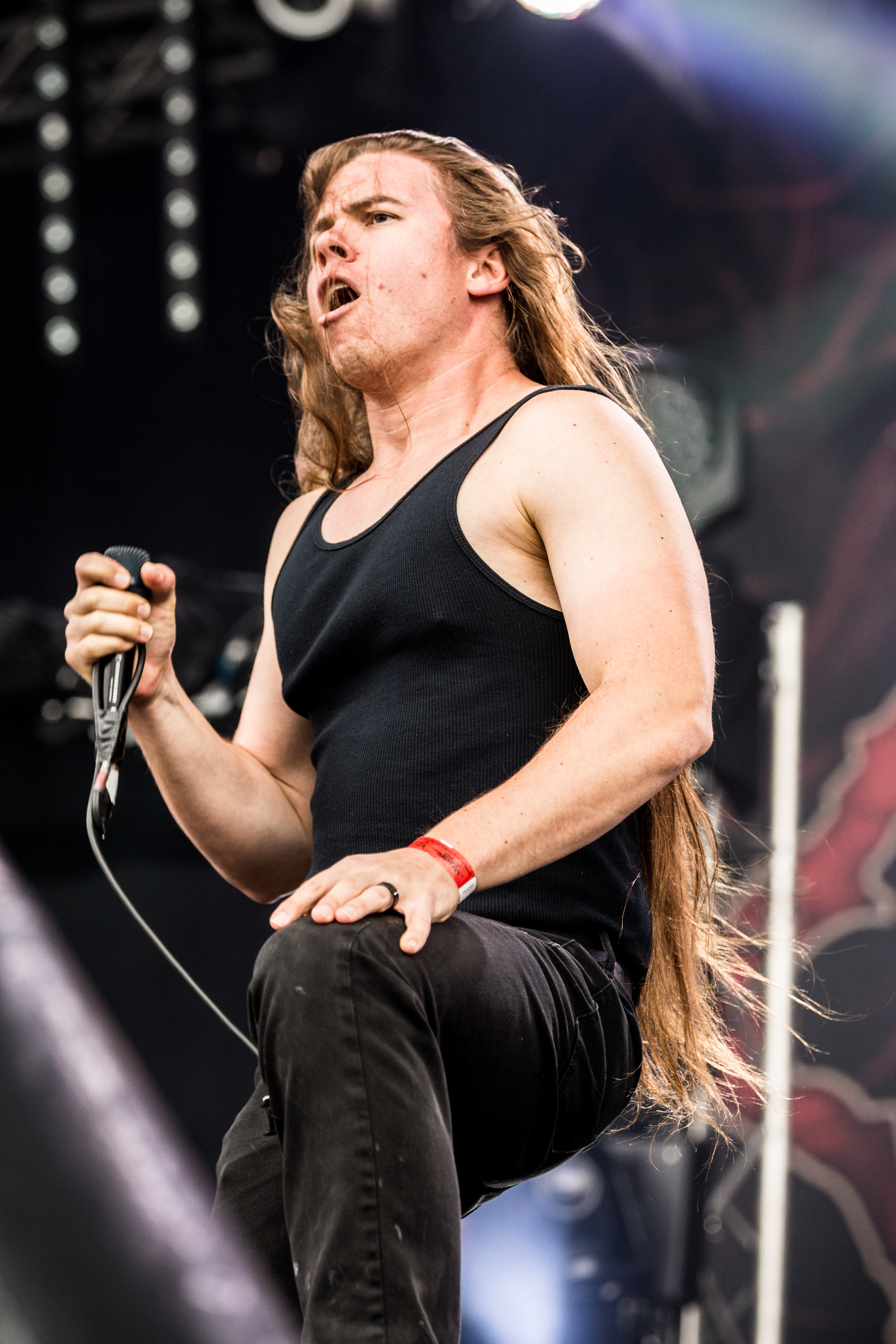
Vocalist Matt McGachy

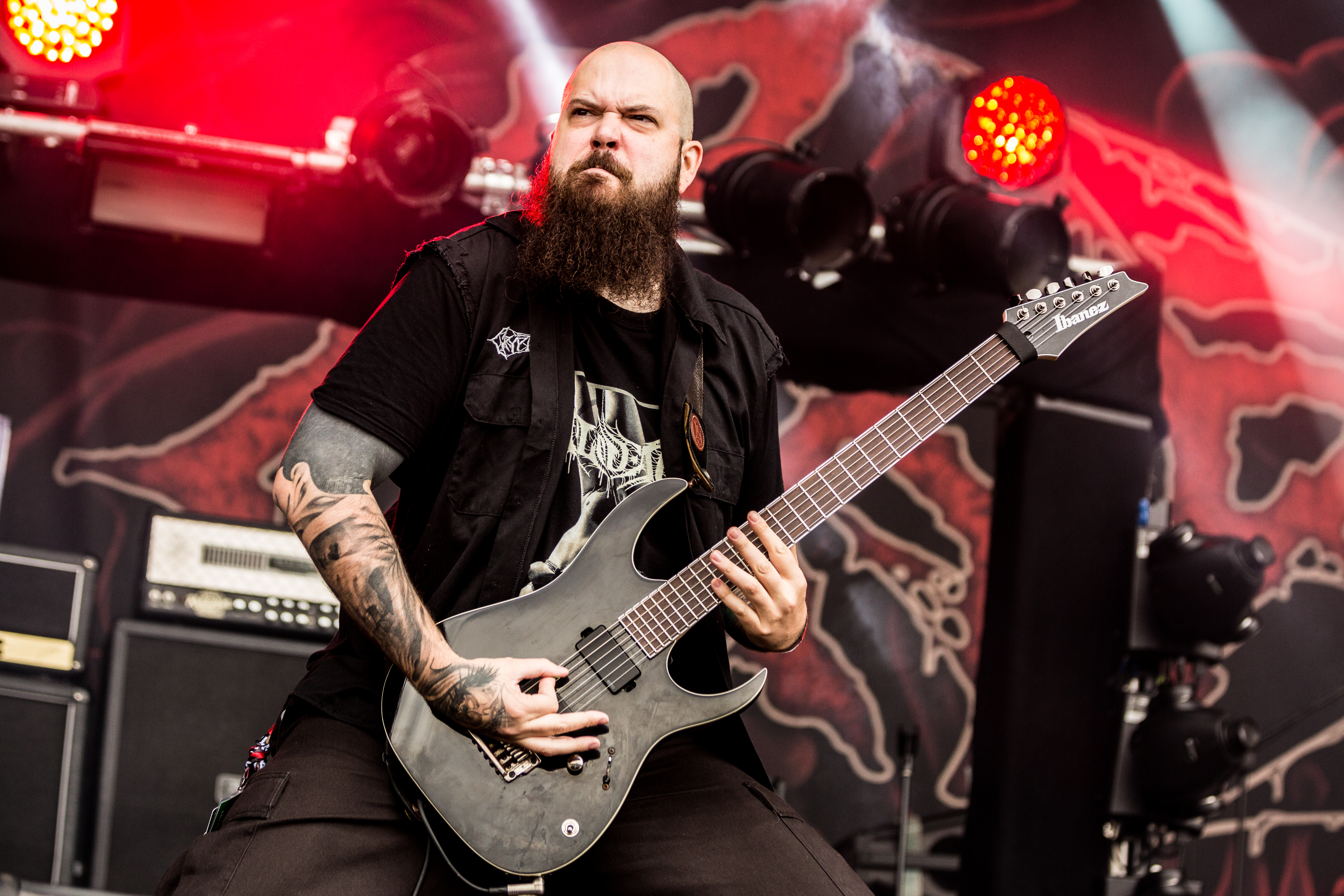
Guitarist Christian Donaldson

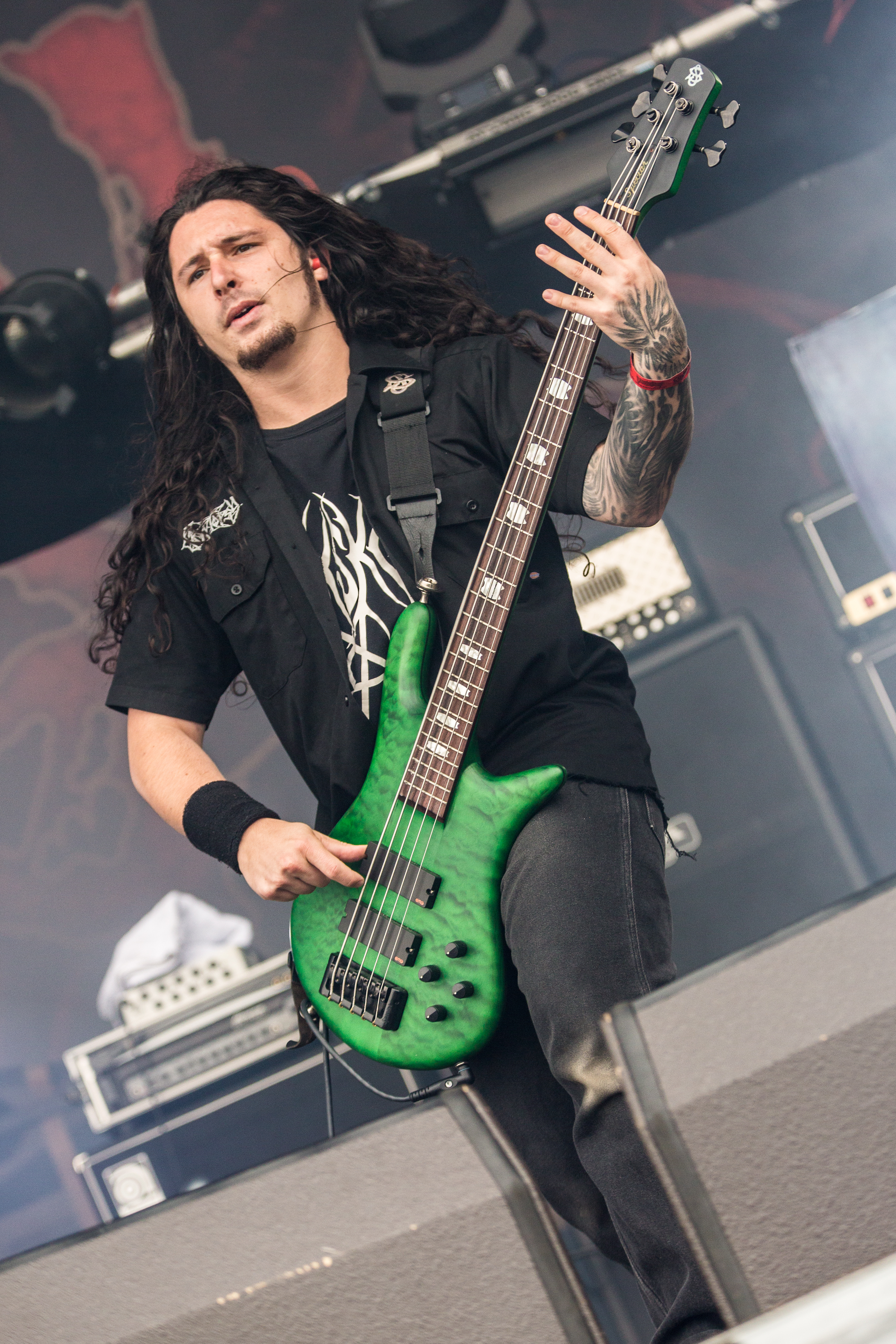
Bassist Olivier Pinard

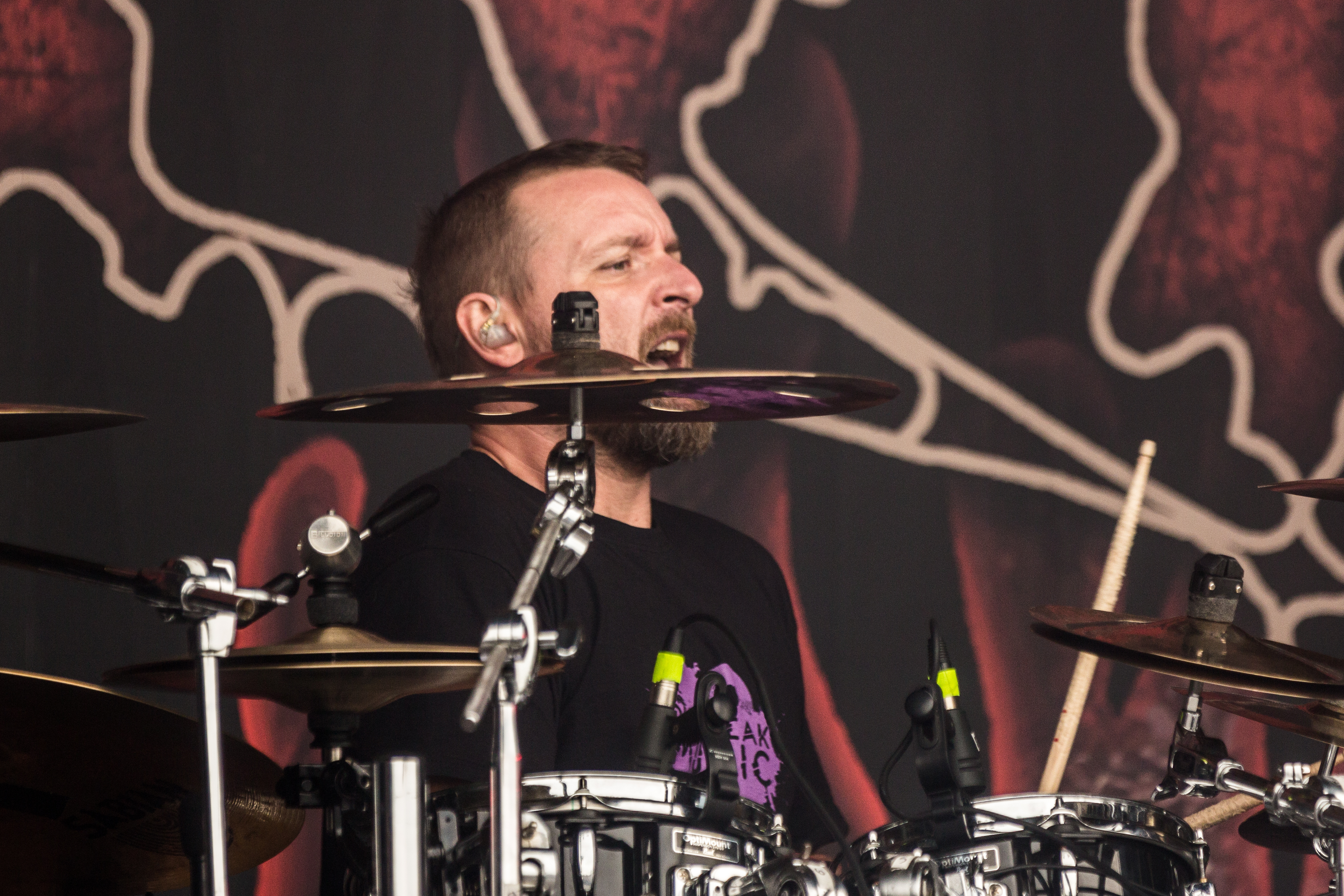
Drummer Flo Mounier

=== Current ===
- Flo Mounier – drums, backing vocals (1992–present)
- Christian Donaldson – guitars (2005–present)
- Matt McGachy – lead vocals (2007–present)
- Olivier Pinard – bass (2012–present)

=== Touring ===
- Daniel Mongrain – rhythm guitar (2004–2005)
- Dominic Grimard – bass (2018–2019)

=== Former ===
- Mike Atkin – drums (1988–1992)
- John Todds – bass, backing vocals (1988–1992)
- Steve Thibault – rhythm guitar, backing vocals (1988–1995), lead guitar (1988–1992)
- Lord Worm – lead vocals (1988–1997, 2003–2007) (ex-Rage Nucléaire)
- Dave Galea – lead guitar (1992–1993)
- Kevin Weagle – bass (1992–1994)
- Jon Levasseur – lead guitar (1993–2005, 2011–2012)
- Martin Fergusson – bass (1994)
- Miguel Roy – rhythm guitar (1995–1999)
- Eric Langlois – bass (1995–2011)
- Mike DiSalvo – lead vocals (1997–2001) (Coma Cluster Void, Akurion, Conflux, ex-Infestation, ex-Mabbus)
- Alex Auburn – rhythm guitar (1999–2003), lead guitar (2004–2009), backing vocals (1999–2009)
- Martin Lacroix – lead vocals (2001–2003, died 2024) (ex-Serocs, ex-Spasme)
- Maggy Durand – keyboards (2007–2008)
- Youri Raymond – rhythm guitar (2009–2011), bass (2011), backing vocals (2009–2011)

== Discography ==
=== Studio albums ===
- Blasphemy Made Flesh (1994)
- None So Vile (1996)
- Whisper Supremacy (1998)
- ...And Then You'll Beg (2000)
- Once Was Not (2005)
- The Unspoken King (2008)
- Cryptopsy (2012)
- As Gomorrah Burns (2023)
- An Insatiable Violence (2025)

=== EPs ===
- The Book of Suffering – Tome I (2015)
- The Book of Suffering – Tome II (2018)

=== Live albums ===
- None So Live (2003)

Demos

- Ungentle Exhumation (1993)

Compilations

- The Best of Us Bleed (2012)
