= Warp Zone (album) =

Studio album by Martyr
- Released: March 11, 2000 (Galy), July 1st, 2026 (Relapse Reissue)
- Recorded: 1999
- Studio: Victor Studio
- Genre: Technical death metal
- Length: 38:38
- Labels: Independent, Sekhmet Records, Europe (2002), Galy Records (2006), Relapse Records (2026)
- Producer: Pierre Rémillard

Martyr chronology
Hopeless Hopes (1997)	Warp Zone (2000)	Extracting the Core (2001)

Professional ratings
Review scores
Source	Rating
Metaluniverse.net	(9.5/10)

Warp Zone is Martyr's 2nd full-length album. It was self-released on March 11, 2000.

Warp Zone was remixed and remastered on vinyl & CD for Relapse Records 10 years later. The album was remixed by Francis Perron at RadicArt Studio with assistance from Daniel and François Mongrain & Remastered by Maor Applebaum at Maor Applebaum Mastering.

Matt Heafy of Trivium called it one of his favorite albums and said "This has been a hugely influential album on me, and they’re a band that I feel are way underrated. They’re a band so many people haven’t heard about but this album is truly a gem. Everyone’s putting technical and jazz elements of things like virtuoso guitarist Allan Holdsworth in there, but these guys were doing it before all of them and Martyr don’t do it for the sake of it, they do it for the sake of new sounding songs. The band incorporate jazz, thrash, death and tech and so much more. They really have their own sound."

== Track listing ==
Warp Zone - Original edition and 2026 reissue
No.	Title	Lyrics	Music	Length
1.	"Warp Zone"	Mongrain, François	Mongrain, Daniel/Lampron, Pier-Luc	3:04
2.	"Virtual Emotions"	Mongrain, Daniel	Mongrain, Daniel	4:07
3.	"Endless Vortex Towards Erasing Destiny"	Mongrain, Daniel	Mongrain, Daniel	3:18
4.	"Deserted Waters"	Mongrain, François	Mongrain, Daniel	4:11
5.	"Carpe Diem"	Mongrain, Daniel	Mongrain, Daniel	4:21
6.	"The Fortune-Teller"	Mongrain, François/Mongrain, Daniel	Mongrain, Daniel	4:22
7.	"Speechless"	Mongrain, François	Mongrain, Daniel	5:02
8.	"Retry? Abort? Ignore?"	Mongrain, François	Mongrain, François	4:28
9.	"Realms of Reverie" (narration by Luc Lemay)	Mongrain, Daniel/Mongrain, François	Mongrain, Daniel	5:45

2002 European edition bonus tracks
No.	Title	Length
10.	"Ostrogoth (Live 2001)"	4:35
11.	"Endless Vortex Towards Erasing Destiny (Live 2001)"	3:36
12.	"Osgoroth (demo version)"	4:38
13.	"Non Conformis (demo version)"	6:56

2006 Galy Records re-issue bonus tracks
No.	Title	Length
10.	"Warp Zone" (1999 demo)	2:38
11.	"Virtual Emotions" (1999 demo)	4:21
12.	"Deserted Waters" (1999 demo)	4:11
13.	"Carpe Diem" (1999 demo)	4:25

== Personnel ==
Martyr

- Daniel Mongrain – lead vocals, guitar
- Pier-Luc Lampron – guitar
- François Mongrain – bass, death growls
- Patrice Hamelin drums, percussion

Special Guest

- Luc Lemay – narration on Realms of Reverie

Production

- Pierre Rémillard - producer and mixing (2000)
- Sébastien Buissières - engineer (2000)
- Francis Perron - mixing (2026)
- Maor Applebaum - mastering (2026)
