= ...And Then You'll Beg =

And Then You'll Beg

Studio album by Cryptopsy
- Released: October 31, 2000
- Recorded: 2000
- Studios: Victor, Montreal, Quebec, Canada
- Genre: Technical death metal
- Length: 39:03
- Label: Century Media
- Producers: Pierre Remillard; Cryptopsy

Cryptopsy chronology
Whisper Supremacy (1998)	And Then You'll Beg (2000)	Once Was Not (2005)

Professional ratings
Review scores
Source	Rating
AllMusic	4/5 stars

And Then You'll Beg is the fourth studio album by Canadian technical death metal band Cryptopsy. It is the first album with guitarist Alex Auburn, and the last album with vocalist Mike DiSalvo and guitarist Jon Levasseur, until Levasseur returned in 2011. "Back to the Worms" was the only track from Ungentle Exhumation that was not re-recorded for the debut album Blasphemy Made Flesh, which was then included into this album. The album starts with a sample from the movie The Matrix.

== Track listing ==
No.	Title	Length
1.	"...And Then It Passes"	5:06
2.	"We Bleed"	6:18
3.	"Voice of Unreason"	2:54
4.	"My Prodigal Son"	2:15
5.	"Shroud"	4:05
6.	"Soar and Envision Sore Vision"	3:29
7.	"Equivalent Equilibrium"	4:17
8.	"Back to the Worms"	3:19
9.	"Screams Go Unheard"	7:20
Total length:		39:03

== Personnel ==
=== Cryptopsy ===
- Mike DiSalvo – lead vocals
- Jon Levasseur – guitars
- Alex Auburn – guitars, vocals
- Eric Langlois – bass guitar
- Flo Mounier – drums, backing vocals

=== Additional personnel ===
- David M. Hughes – didgeridoo (track 9)
- Dave Galea – technical adviser
- Graves – mastering
- Louis Legault – engineering assistant
- Pierre Rémillard – production, engineering, mixing
- Francois Quevillon – design, illustration, photography
