= Fulci (band) =

Death metal band

- Origin: Caserta, Campania, Italy
- Genre: Death metal
- Years active: 2013-present
- Labels: 20 Buck Spin, Maggot Stomp, Time to Kill, CBC
- Members: Clemente "Klem" Diglio; Domenico "Dome" Diego; Fiore Stravino; Edoardo Nicoloso; Ando Ferraiuolo

Fulci is a death metal band from Caserta, Italy. The band is named after Italian film director Lucio Fulci.

== History ==
Formed in 2013, the initial lineup of Fulci consisted of Clemente "Klem" Diglio on bass, Domenico "Dome" Diego on guitars and, Fiore Stravino on vocals. They released their first demo Incubus in the Surgery Room in 2014.

The band's debut studio album Opening the Hell Gates was released in 2015 by CBC Records. In 2019, they released their second studio album Tropical Sun, which received critical acclaim and brought the band significant international attention.

Following the success of Tropical Sun, Fulci released their third studio album Exhumed Information in 2021. The band started touring in Europe and the United States extensively to promote this album. While on tour in the US, they recorded a live/compilation album titled The Morrisound Session at the prestigious Morrisound Recording studio in Tampa, Florida.

In 2023, additional guitarist Ando Ferraiuolo and drummer Edoardo Nicoloso joined the main lineup. They were signed with the American extreme metal label 20 Buck Spin to release their fourth studio album Duck Face Killings in 2024.

In 2025, the band played in the Obscene Extreme festival in Czechia. Subsequently, in 2026, Fulci was announced as support for Cryptopsy on the 13th iteration of the Decibel Magazine Tour in North America.. However, due to visa issues, the band was unable to attend, and their festival slot was replaced with Spirit Adrift.

== Musical style and influences ==
Rich Hobson of Metal Hammer said Fulci sounds like "suppurating sarcomas of gurgling old-school carnage, engorged with samples, synths and subterranean gangsta flow." Thematically, the band's music draws influence from horror films. The band has drawn comparisons to Cannibal Corpse, Mortician and Fluids.

== Discography ==
=== Studio albums ===
- Opening the Hell Gates (2015)
- Tropical Sun (2019)
- Exhumed Information (2021)
- Duck Face Killings (2024)

== Band members ==
- Clemente "Klem" Diglio - bass (2013-present)
- Domenico "Dome" Diego - guitars, synthesizers (2013-present)
- Fiore Stravino - vocals (2013-present)
- Edoardo Nicoloso - drums (2023-present)
- Ando Ferraiuolo - guitars (2023-present)
