= WE, Invaders =

_wE, Invaders

EP by uneXpect
- Released: November 2003
- Genre: Avant-garde metal Extreme metal Progressive metal
- Length: 26:36
- Label: Galy Records
- Producer: uneXpect

UneXpect chronology
Utopia (1999)	_wE, Invaders (2003)	In a Flesh Aquarium (2006)

_wE, Invaders is the second release, and first EP by Canadian avant-garde extreme metal band uneXpect.

== Track listing ==
1. "Novaë" – 6:52
2. "Rooted Shadows" – 6:08
3. "In Velvet Coffins We Slept" (re-recording) – 8:22
4. "Chromatic Chimera" – 5:14

== Personnel ==
- syriaK – Vocals, guitars
- Artagoth – Vocals, guitars
- Le bateleur – Violins
- Leïlindel – Vocals
- ExoD – Keyboards, synthesizers, sampling
- ChaotH – 7 and 9 string bass
- Dasnos – Drums on "Rooted Shadows" and "In Velvet Coffins We Slept"
- Anthony Trujillo – Drums on "Novaë"

Guest musicians

- Nathalie Duchesne – additional violin and cello
- Stéphanie Colerette – additional violin and cello
