= Beneath the Massacre =

Canadian technical death metal band

- Origin: Montreal, Quebec, Canada
- Genres: Technical death metal, deathcore
- Years active: 2004–present
- Labels: Century Media, Prosthetic, Galy
- Members: Elliot Desgagnés; Christopher Bradley; Dennis Bradley; Anthony Barone
- Past members: Justin Rousselle; Christian Pepin; Patrice Hamelin

Beneath the Massacre is a Canadian technical death metal band from Montreal, Quebec. Their debut EP, Evidence of Inequity, was released in 2005, under Galy Records. In early 2006, the band signed with Prosthetic Records and released their first full-length album, Mechanics of Dysfunction, on the label on February 20, 2007. They were on the 2007 Brutalitour with Animosity, As Blood Runs Black, and the Faceless. They played the Summer Slaughter Tour with Decapitated, Necrophagist, As Blood Runs Black, the Faceless, Ion Dissonance, and Cephalic Carnage. They were on the 2007 Radio Rebellion Tour with Job for a Cowboy, Behemoth, and Gojira.

== History ==
Beneath the Massacre was formed in the summer of 2004, consisting of vocalist Elliot Desgagnés, guitarist Christopher Bradley, bassist Dennis Bradley, and drummer Justin Rousselle. In May 2005, they released a five-track EP, Evidence of Inequity, through Canadian label Galy Records. Yannick St-Amand produced the EP and Alan Douches mastered it. Beneath the Massacre announced a Canadian tour to promote the album in September 2005 supporting Neuraxis, but had to cancel due to an accident with their van outside Thunder Bay, Ontario.

In May 2006, Beneath the Massacre signed a deal with Prosthetic Records, and soon after, they started a Canadian tour with Leng Tch'e and Fuck the Facts. The band began to work with St-Amand on a new album in June that same year, in parallel several dates were announced, including shows at the Toronto Terrorfest with over 60 bands at the three-day festival between July 14–16, the Robot Mosh Fest in Milwaukee, then in the same month Trails Unto the Sick concerts with Neuraxis, which included the San Antonio Better off Dead Fest and Albuquerque's Gathering of the Sick Fest. Beneath the Massacre contributed the track "Profitable Killcount" to a 2006 Japanese-only compilation album titled Canadian Metal in Japan, released by Cyclone Records. The band's full-length debut album, Mechanics of Dysfunction, also produced by St-Amand and mixed by Pierre Rémillard, was released in February 2007 through Prosthetic Records.

In 2008, the group released their second full-length album, Dystopia, through Prosthetic label on October 28, 2008. The album was recorded in the Northern Studio in Montreal, Quebec by St-Amand, and mixed by Jason Suecof with artwork by Felix Rancourt. Beneath the Massacre toured with Darkest Hour and Bleeding Through, among others, in the Thrash and Burn European Tour 2009 in April and May 2009 in Europe. In April 2009, Beneath the Massacre was nominated as "Best Underground Band" at the Metal Hammer Golden Gods Awards.

Beneath the Massacre finished recording an EP in July 2010, which was confirmed to be named Marée Noire (French: "black tide"). Vocalist Desgagnés stated, "It's going to be two years since our last album and we had the idea of a short release while we keep writing for the next full length. We picked five songs to go on the EP and I feel like these are by far the best songs we've ever written. Nothing that different from our other releases but we're always getting a little closer to the sound we want. So we're all satisfied with the result and are looking forward to share it." By late 2011, the band had finished their third full-length album and on February 14, 2012, it was released through Prosthetic. The album's name is Incongruous. To support the release, they toured Europe in early 2012 as part of the Bonecrusher fest with Carnifex, Molotov Solution, Within the Ruins, and Betraying the Martyrs.

After 2012, the band was quiet for several years. In 2018, it was revealed that Beneath the Massacre planned to record and release new material by 2019, as well as return to touring. The news was confirmed by the band's manager, who confirmed that the band never broke up. Following the news, the band announced a tour for June 2019. On February 28, 2020, Beneath the Massacre released their fourth album, Fearmonger.

== Band members ==
Current

- Christopher Bradley – guitar (2004–present)
- Dennis Bradley – bass (2004–present)
- Elliot Desgagnés – vocals (2004–present)
- Anthony Barone – drums (2019–present)

Former

- Christian Pepin – guitar (2004–2005)
- Justin Rousselle – drums (2004–2011)
- Patrice Hamelin – drums (2012–2019)

Timeline

== Discography ==
Studio albums

- Mechanics of Dysfunction (2007)
- Dystopia (2008)
- Incongruous (2012)
- Fearmonger (2020)

Extended plays

- Evidence of Inequity (2005)
- Marée Noire (2010)

== Music videos ==
- "Society's Disposable Son" (2007)
- "Rise of the Fearmonger" (2020)
- "Treacherous" (2020)
- "Autonomous Mind" (2021)
