= Feeding the Abscess =

Studio album by Martyr
- Released: October 31st, 2006 (Galy), July 1st, 2026 (Relapse Reissue)
- Recorded: 2006 at Wild Studio, Breen Leboeuf Studio and Note-Studio
- Studios: Wild Studio (Guitars, Drums, Bass), Breen Leboeuf Studio (Vocals), Note-Studio (violins), RadicArt Studio (remix)
- Genre: Technical death metal
- Length: 42:51
- Labels: Galy Records (2006), Relapse Records (2026)
- Producers: Pierre Rémillard and Yannick St-Amand (2006)

Martyr chronology
Extracting the Core (2001)	Feeding the Abscess (2006)	Havoc in Quebec City (2008)

Professional ratings
Review scores
Source	Rating
Metaluniverse.net	(9.8/10)
Metalstorm.net	(9.3/10)

Feeding The Abscess is Martyr's 3rd full-length album. It was released by Galy Records in 2006.

== Track listing ==
Feeding the Abscess - Original edition and 2026 reissue
No.	Title	Lyrics	Music	Length
1.	"Perpetual Healing (Infinite Pain)"	Mongrain, Daniel/Papirakis, Philippe	Mongrain, Daniel/Papirakis, Philippe	5:31
2.	"Lost in Sanity"	Mongrain, François/Papirakis, Philippe	Mongrain, Daniel/Carboneau, Martin	4:56
3.	"Feast of Vermin"	Papirakis, Philippe/Mongrain, François	Mongrain, François	3:36
4.	"Desolate Ruins"		Mongrain, François	1:01
5.	"Havoc"	Papirakis, Philippe/Mongrain, François	Mongrain, François	3:34
6.	"Nameless, Faceless, Neverborn"	Mongrain, Daniel/Papirakis, Philippe	Mongrain, Daniel/Carbonneau, Martin	5:34
7.	"Silent Science"	Mongrain, François/Papirakis, Philippe	Mongrain, Daniel/Mongrain, François	4:27
8.	"Felony"	Mongrain, François/Papirakis, Philippe	Mongrain, Daniel	5:30
9.	"Dead Horizon, Pt. 1: Echoes of the Unseen"	Papirakis, Philippe	Carbonneau, Martin/Mongrain, Daniel/Hamelin, Patrice	2:22
10.	"Dead Horizon, Pt. 2: Romancing Ghouls"	Papirakis, Philippe	Mongrain, François/Mongrain, Daniel	2:34
11.	"Dead Horizon, Pt. 3: Stasis Field"		Mongrain, Daniel	0:35
12.	"Dead Horizon, Pt. 4: Shellshocked"	Papirakis, Philippe	Mongrain, François/Mongrain, Daniel/Carbonneau, Martin	3:01

2006 Galy Records bonus track
No.	Title	Music	Length
13.	"Brain Scan" (Voivod Cover)	Bélanger, Denis/D'Amour, Denis/Langevin, Michel/Thériault, Jean-Yves/Voivod	5:30

== Personnel ==
Martyr

- Daniel Mongrain – lead vocals, guitar
- Martin Carbonneau - guitar
- François Mongrain - bass, death growls
- Patrice Hamelin - drums

Guest lyricist

- Philippe Papirakis

Guest musicians

- Pier-Luc Lampron - lead guitar (track #3)
- Antoine Bareil - violins (track #2, #5, #12)
- Breen Leboeuf - narration (track #8)

Production

- Pierre Rémillard - producer and mixing (2006)
- Yannick St-Amand - engineer (2006)
- Martin Grandbois - violins recording (2006)
- Breen Leboeuf - vocals recording (2006)
- Francis Perron - mixing (2026)
- Alan Douches - mastering (2006)
- Maor Applebaum - mastering (2026)
