= In a Flesh Aquarium =

Studio album by uneXpect
- Released: August 22, 2006
- Genre: Avant-garde metal, extreme metal, progressive metal
- Length: 60:32
- Label: The End
- Producer: Syriak and Unexpect

UneXpect chronology
wE, Invaders (2003)	In a Flesh Aquarium (2006)	Fables of the Sleepless Empire (2011)

Professional ratings
Review scores
Source	Rating
About.com	3.5/5 stars
Sputnikmusic	4/5 stars

In a Flesh Aquarium is the second full-length album by Canadian avant-garde extreme metal band uneXpect. It was released on August 22, 2006 through The End Records. This is the first album to include Landryx as the new drummer and the last album to feature Le Bateleur on violin.

SyriaK wrote all lyrics, except "Megalomaniac Trees" by Artagoth and "The Shiver" by ChaotH. The lyrics to "Another Dissonant Chord" were translated to Hungarian by the Hegyesy family (relatives of Leïlindel); the booklet also includes the English translation.

The album was re-released in Europe in 2007 by Ascendance Records and distributed worldwide by Plastic Head, with a different album cover and also including the 2003 release wE, Invaders as a bonus CD, which includes a bonus track entitled "Puppet's Strange Vision" composed by ExoD.

== Track listing ==
In a Flesh Aquarium

- All lyrics by SyriaK, all music by UnexpecT (unless otherwise noted).
1. "Chromatic Chimera" – 5:52
2. "Feasting Fools" – 6:17
3. "Desert Urbania" – 7:30
4. "Summoning Scenes" – 7:47
5. "Silence 011010701" – 5:14 (music: ExoD)
6. "Megalomaniac Trees" – 5:57 (lyrics: Artagoth)
7. "The Shiver - Another Dissonant Chord" – 3:00
8. "The Shiver - Meet Me at the Carrousel" – 4:08
9. "The Shiver - A Clown's Mindtrap" – 3:41
10. "Psychic Jugglers" – 11:10

== Personnel ==
- Leïlindel – vocals
- SyriaK – vocals, guitar, piano on "Psychic Juggle"
- Artagoth – vocals, guitar
- ExoD – keyboard, piano, sampling
- Le Bateleur – violin
- ChaotH – 7- and 9-stringed bass guitar
- Landryx – drums

=== Guest musicians ===
- Amélie Blanchette – clarinet on "Psychic Juggle"
- Nathalie Duchesne – additional violin and cello on "Summoning Scenes", "The Shiver", and "Psychic Juggle"
- Stéphanie Colerette – additional violin and cello on "Summoning Scenes", "The Shiver", and "Psychic Juggle"
- Benjamin Proulx-Mathers – saxophone on "Megalomaniac Trees"

== Production ==
- Produced By UnexpecT
- Engineered, Mixed & Mastered By Serge Cossette
