= Unorthodox Creative Criteria =

Studio album by Coprofago
- Released: June 20, 2005
- Recorded: 2004
- Genre: Technical death metal, jazz fusion
- Length: 49:25
- Label: Sekhmet/Galy

Coprofago chronology
Genesis (2000)	Unorthodox Creative Criteria (2005)

Professional ratings
Review scores
Source	Rating
BW&BK	8/10

Unorthodox Creative Criteria is the third studio album by Chilean technical death metal band Coprofago. The album was originally released through Sekhmet Records with 10 tracks. This was rushed because of the outbreak in various festivals with the band. But the band was unhappy with the result of this version and the album was remixed and re-released a year later with full acceptance of the band members. This new version contains 3 bonus tracks and the album artwork is different.

== Track listing ==
1. "Crippled Tracker" – 3:19
2. "The Inborn Mechanics" – 3:52
3. "Neutralized" – 3:28
4. "Merge Into" – 1:27
5. "Fractures" – 2:17
6. "Hostile Silent Raptures" – 5:09
7. "Streams" – 2:10
8. "Isolated Through Multiplicity" – 5:12
9. "Individual Choice" – 3:10
10. "Glimpses" – 2:45
11. "Constriction" – 2:25
12. "Motion" – 7:09
13. "Wavelength" – 7:02
