= Galy Records =

- Founded: 2002
- Founder: Eric Galy
- Status: Active
- Distributor(s): F.A.B.
- Genre: Extreme metal
- Country of origin: Canada
- Location: Verdun, Quebec
- Official website: www.galyrecords.com

Galy Records is a Canadian independent record label based in Verdun, Quebec, founded by Eric Galy in 2002. The label includes albums released for bands such as Dead Brain Cells, Neuraxis, Despised Icon, Gorguts, Unexpect, Infernäl Mäjesty, Anvil, Beneath the Massacre, Coprofago, Ion Dissonance, Martyr, Anonymus, Fuck the Facts and Infected Malignity.

== Catalog ==
Year	No.	Artist	Title
	1	—	—
2002	2	Dead Brain Cells	Unreleased
2002	3	Ghoulunatics	Mystralengine
2002	4	Unquintessence	Ruined
2002	5	Neuraxis	Truth Beyond...
2002	6	Despised Icon	Consumed by Your Poison
2002	7	various artists	Trois-Rivières MetalFest 2002
2003	8	Blinded by Faith	Under an Occult Sun
2003	9	various artists	Galy Records 2003 Sampler
2003	10	Gorguts	...And Then Comes Lividity / Demo Anthology
2003	11	Fate	Odyssey
2003	12	Descend into Nothingness	Darkened Reality
2003	13	various artists	Trois-Rivières MetalFest 2003
2003	14	Unexpect	WE, Invaders
2003	15	Eradykate	Rektaliation
2004	16	Magister Dixit	Infernal Martyrism
2004	17	Neuraxis	Imagery / A Passage into Forlorn
2004	18	Infernäl Mäjesty	One Who Points to Death
2004	19	Ghoulunatics	Sabacthany
2004	20	Ghoulunatics	It's a Live!
2004	21	Anvil	Back to Basics
2004	22	Bloodshoteye	Without Any Remorse
2005	23	various artists	Galy Records – Sampler Vol. 2
2004	24	Horfixion	Self Inflicted Hell
2004	25	various artists	Trois-Rivières MetalFest 2004
2004	26	Augury	Concealed
2004	27	Torn Within	Allied with Bitterness
2004	28	Disphoria	Sleep and Fly Away... You'll Be Tortured Forever
2004	29	Anhkrehg	Against You All...
2004	30	Soulscar	Victim Impact Statement
2004	31	Eclipse Eternal	Reign of the Unholy Blackened Empire
2005	32	Ghoulunatics	Blood Curdling Years
2005	33	Beneath the Massacre	Evidence of Inequity
2005	34	Camilla Rhodes	Like the Word Love on the Lips of a Harlot
2005	35	Vortex	Imminence of Death
2005	36	various artists	Trois-Rivières MetalFest 2005
2006	37	Blinded by Faith	Veiled Hideousness
2006	38	Coprofago	Unorthodox Creative Criteria
2006	39	Shades of Dusk	Caress the Despair
2006	40	Bloodshoteye	An Unrelenting Assault
2006	41	Shaolin	Gaining Freedom at the Expense of Virtue
2006	42	Atheretic	Apocalyptic Nature Fury
2006	43	Quills	Quills
2006	44	Ion Dissonance / Despised Icon	Demos 2002 & 2004 (split)
2006	45	Soulscar	Endgame
2006	46	Ghoulunatics	Cryogénie
2007	47	Reanimator	Thrashin' the Neighborhood
2006	48	Martyr	Feeding the Abscess
2006	49	Anonymus	Chapter Chaos Begins
2006	50	various artists	Trois-Rivières MetalFest 2006
2007	51	Blinded by Faith	Imperial Collapse – Live in Quebec City (DVD)
2007	52	Blinded by Faith	Imperial Collapse – Live in Quebec City
2007	53	Soothsayer	To Be a Real Terrorist
2007	54	Fuck the Facts	Collection of Splits 2002-2004
2007	55	Blinded by Faith	Weapons of Mass Distraction
2007	56	The Truckers	Get Rich or Drive Trying
2007	57	Covenance	The Wasting
2007	58	Point Blank Rage	Sound of Resistance
2007	59	Infected Malignity	Re:Bel
2007	60	L'Esprit du Clan	Chapitre III: Corpus Delicti
2007	61	Neuraxis	Live Progression
2007	62	various artists	Trois-Rivières MetalFest 2007
2008	63	Martyr	Havoc in Quebec City (DVD)
2008	64	Ghoulunatics	The Beast of 1994–2008
2008	65	The Last Felony	Aeon of Suffering
2008	66	various artists	Trois-Rivières MetalFest 2008
2009	67	Vatican	Shotgun Evangelium
2009	68	Reanimator	Ignorance Is No Excuse
2009	69	various artists	Trois-Rivières MetalFest 2009
2010	70	Vortex	Enemies
2010	71	various artists	Trois-Rivières MetalFest 2010
2011	72	Apocalyptic Fear	Dawn Of The Ritual
2011	73	Unbreakable Hatred	Total Chaos
74	??	??	
75	Riotor	Fucking Metal + Death and Destruction	
All albums were released on Compact Disc (CD) format, except where noted; "—" denotes unassigned catalog numbers
