= Cryptopsy (album) =

Studio album by Cryptopsy
- Released: September 14, 2012
- Recorded: Garage Studio, Montreal, Quebec, Canada. Drums at Mounier's studio.
- Genre: Technical death metal
- Length: 34:53
- Producer: Christian Donaldson

Cryptopsy chronology
The Unspoken King (2008)	Cryptopsy (2012)	As Gomorrah Burns (2023)

Professional ratings
Review scores
Source	Rating
Blabbermouth	9.0/10

Cryptopsy is the seventh studio album by Canadian technical death metal band Cryptopsy. It was released on September 14, 2012. The album marks a return to the band's original technical death metal style, following the pivot to deathcore on their previous album, The Unspoken King (2008).

== Track listing ==
All lyrics are written by Matt McGachy; all music is composed by Cryptopsy except where noted

No.	Title	Length
1.	"Two-Pound Torch"	5:04
2.	"Shag Harbour's Visitors" (Cryptopsy, Youri Raymond)	4:22
3.	"Red-Skinned Scapegoat"	5:57
4.	"Damned Draft Dodgers"	3:58
5.	"Amputated Enigma"	4:03
6.	"The Golden Square Mile" (Cryptopsy, Raymond)	3:13
7.	"Ominous"	3:47
8.	"Cleansing the Hosts"	4:36
Total length:		34:53

== Personnel ==
=== Cryptopsy ===
- Matt McGachy – vocals
- Jon Levasseur – lead guitar
- Christian Donaldson – rhythm guitar
- Olivier Pinard – bass
- Flo Mounier – drums

=== Production ===
- Jef Fortin – mastering
- Christian Donaldson – production, engineering, mixing
- Anthony Dubois – photography
- Mircea Gabriel Eftemie – cover art, artwork, design
