= Marco Calliari =

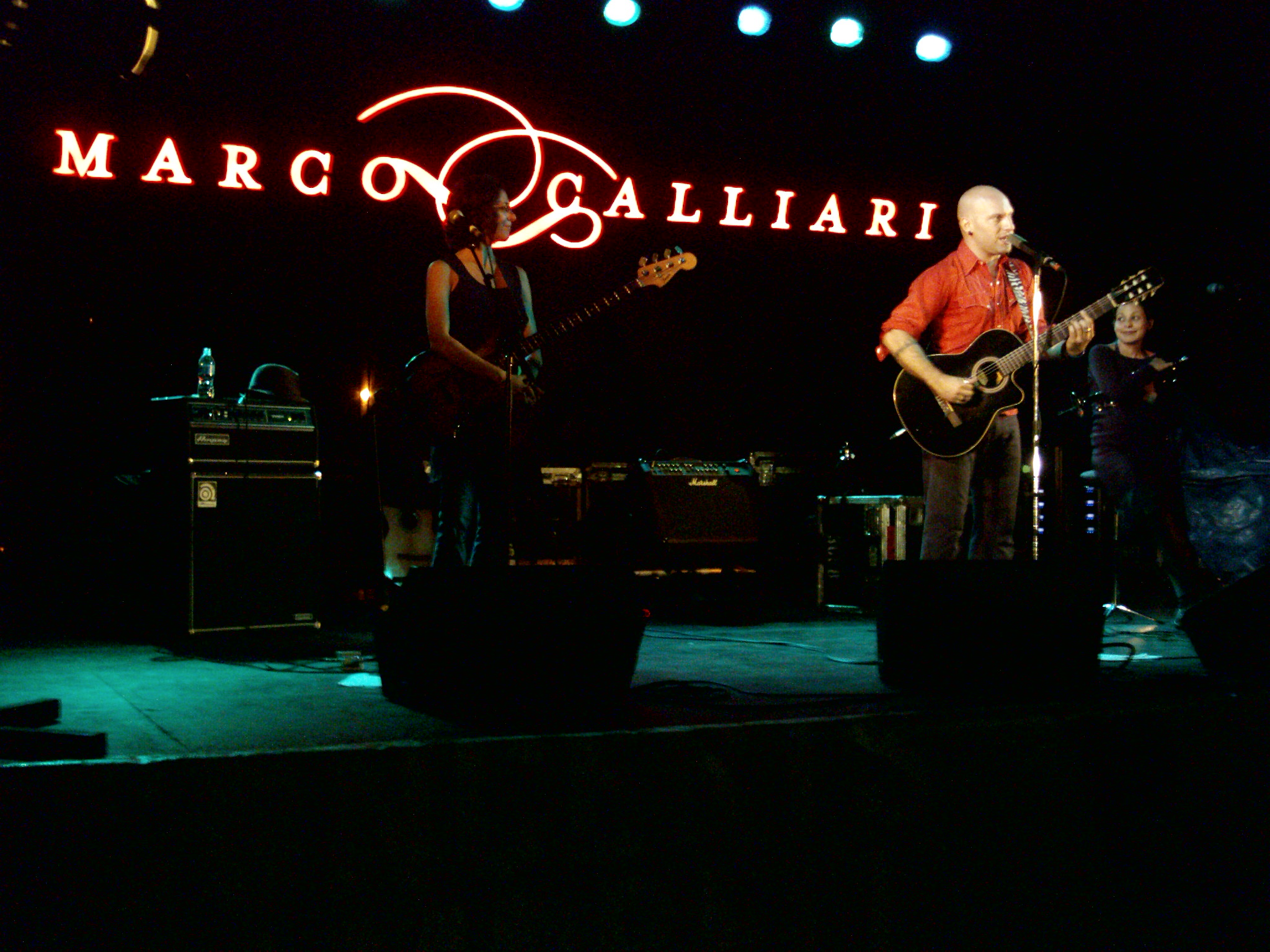
- Calliari Live in Montreal

Background information
- Origin: Montreal, Quebec, Canada
- Years active: 1989–present
- Formerly of: Anonymus
- Website: marcocalliari.com

Marco Calliari is a singer-songwriter born in Quebec from Italian parents. He began his career in 1989 in forming the thrash metal group Anonymus alongside Carlos Araya and brothers Daniel and Oscar Souto. Since 2003, he pursued a solo career that has so far released three albums: Che la vita, Mia dolce vita, and Al faro est.

With his first album, Che la vita, Calliari found a way to reconnect with his parents' country of origin. The album, based on Italian folklore and jazz influences, won Calliari the Galaxy award in the summer of 2004, given by the CBC at a music festival in Abitibi-Témiscamingue and was nominated at the Gala MIMI in 2005. An active member of the Italian community in Montreal, he has also participated in first two editions of Ritalfest, a festival honoring Italian music in Quebec.

== Discography ==
=== Albums ===
- Che la vita, 2003
1. Bella luna
2. Angelo
3. Che la vita... (camminar)
4. Il scelto
5. Lacrime
6. Queste parole
7. Amore
8. Tierra
9. Solo
10. Matta ma sana
11. Paura
12. Ô
13. Torna a Surriento
14. Lontana
- Mia dolce vita, 2006
1. L'americano
2. L'italiano
3. Leggenda di natale
4. Chi è, e non è
5. 'O sole mio
6. Recitar! (Vesti la giubba)
7. Caruso
8. I due fannulloni
9. Chitarra romana
10. Bella ciao
11. La montanara
12. Cosa nostra (The Godfather Medley)
13. Mattinata
- Al dente, DVD double, 2006
- Al faro est, 2010
1. Sierras, cielo y almas
2. Per fortuna
3. Bino di Bedonia
4. Andare, camminare, lavorare
5. Ho un amico
6. Flamenka
7. Ladro di pensieri
8. Freddo
9. Il valzer dell'amore infinito
10. Come se fosse
11. La Rabbia
12. Tango Porco
13. Al faro est

=== Singles ===
Year	Single	Peak chart positions
Year	Single	UK
2010	"We No Speak Americano"	26

== Other interests ==
- Le Monde de Belle et Bum, 2004 : "Che la vita"
- Les Rythmes de Belle et Bum, 2005 : "Quand le soleil dit bonjour aux montagnes" (avec Lynda Thalie)
- Serge Fiori : Un musicien parmi tant d'autres, 2006 : "Che la vita" (Dixie)
- Cooking 3, 2006 : "Bella luna"
- Le Noël Angélique de Sœur Angèle, 2006 : "Tu scendi dalle stelle"
