= Fables of the Sleepless Empire =

Studio album by uneXpect
- Released: May 31, 2011
- Genres: Avant-garde metal, extreme metal, progressive metal
- Length: 55:46
- Label: Independent
- Producers: Syriak and Unexpect

UneXpect chronology
In a Flesh Aquarium (2006)	Fables of the Sleepless Empire (2011)

Fables of the Sleepless Empire is the third and final full-length album by Canadian avant-garde extreme metal band uneXpect. It was released independently on May 31, 2011.

Rae Amitay of Your Last Rites described the album as "a gorgeously grotesque journey into total insanity."

== Track listing ==
1. "Unsolved Ideas of a Distorted Guest" – 6:54
2. "Words" – 5:57
3. "Orange Vigilantes" – 4:55
4. "Mechanical Phoenix" – 6:55
5. "The Quantum Symphony" – 6:04
6. "Unfed Pendulum" – 7:55
7. "In the Mind of the Last Whale" – 2:58
8. "Silence this Parasite" – 5:19
9. "A Fading Stance" – 2:06
10. "When the Joyful Dead are Dancing" – 4:38
11. "Until Yet a Few More Deaths Do Us Part" – 2:05

== Personnel ==
- Leïlindel – vocals
- SyriaK – vocals, guitar
- Artagoth – vocals, guitar
- ExoD – keyboard, piano, sampling
- Borboen – violin
- ChaotH – 9-stringed bass guitar
- Landryx – drums

=== Production ===
- Mixed by Jef Fortin with the assistance of Syriak, Leïlindel & Unexpect at Badass Studio.
- Mastered, Engineered, Edited and Re-amped by Jef Fortin at Badass Studio.
- Drums, Vocals & Bass Recorded at Badass Studio by Jef Fortin.
- Guitars, Keyboard & Violins recorded at home studios.
- Additional Vocal track recorded at J-C Desjardins (Caraan & Shy Shit) home studio.
- All inside graphic work and modifications have been done by Éric Charron; cover art by Mario Sanchez Nevado.
- Photographies by Élaine Phaneuf .
