= None So Vile =

Studio album by Cryptopsy
- Released: 3 July 1996
- Recorded: December 1995 – January 1996
- Studios: Studio Victor, Montreal
- Genres: Technical death metal; brutal death metal
- Length: 32:03
- Label: Wrong Again
- Producers: Pierre Rémillard; Cryptopsy

Cryptopsy chronology
Blasphemy Made Flesh (1994)	None So Vile (1996)	Whisper Supremacy (1998)

None So Vile is the second studio album by Canadian death metal band Cryptopsy, released on 3 July 1996 by Wrong Again Records. The album was later reissued by Displeased Records and Century Media Records. It was re-released on vinyl in 2012 by War on Music. The album is stylistically a technical death metal and brutal death metal album, described as "absolutely chaotic." The album features lyrical themes largely regarding violence, blasphemy, gore, and occult horror.

None So Vile is the first album to feature bassist Eric Langlois, and the last to feature vocalist Lord Worm, until his return on 2005's Once Was Not.

The album has gained a cult following since its release, and is now considered a classic within the death metal genre.

== Background ==
After the release of the band's previous album, Blasphemy Made Flesh, the band toured to support the album but struggled financially. Lord Worm would explain: "Some fall shows it got to the point where it was 'pay-to-play'. We had to rent a vehicle, pay for that, pay for the gas, pay for food, and pay for the space, pay for this, pay for that, it always came out of our pocket. Pay for merchandise, people would buy merchandise so we'd have to buy more, and the money was also being reinvested into Cryptopsy, but not the musicians. We weren't living off the money; Cryptopsy the entity was like a vampire sucking all the money out of our existence."

== Music and lyrics ==
William York of AllMusic described None So Vile's sound as "almost entirely relentless," and Ultimate Guitar senior editor David Slavković said "It's really hard to find anything as raw and brutal as Cryptopsy". Kerrang! described the album's style as "technical without being bloated, blasphemous without being cheesy, [and] brutal without being predictable." Joe DiVita of Loudwire characterized the sound as "almost sounding as if two albums are being played on top of one another."

Decibel characterized the album's sound as demonstrating "monstrous groove, maniacal tempos, savagely bangable riffs and scorched-throat vocals." Kevin Stewart-Panko of Decibel described Cryptopsy vocalist Lord Worm's vocals as "the most artful use of the death growl ever put on record," and his lyrics as "literate, profane, wryly funny, [and] Burroughs-esque". William York of AllMusic described Lord Worm's vocals as "a mix of psychotic low-end growls and tortured screams" and called them "suitably intense and scary." Worm's vocals are largely unintelligible, and he "blatantly" omits syllables from his pronunciation of words.

Daniel Lake of Decibel said None So Vile is instrumentally "brimming with technical ability that nevertheless always feels a half-second away from fraying, fragmenting and falling apart." The album features downtuned guitars, complex time signatures, dissonant harmonies, "mid-paced chugging", and "blistering" guitar solos. William York of AllMusic described the album's sound as "tight, fast, and complex" and the riffs as "darkly catchy." Some of the tracks have drawn comparisons to thrash metal. The album makes use of samples. The album's sixth track, "Phobophile", features a piano intro that draws influence from classical music.

Some of the album's lyrical themes include dismemberment and cannibalism. Sociologist Natalie Purcell stated the album's lyrics are "equally [as] chilling" as the lyrics written by Chris Barnes on Cannibal Corpse's third studio album, Tomb of the Mutilated. She said the lyrics "not only describe gruesome acts, but also offer speculation as to the feelings, drives and desires that would motivate a person to commit such acts."

The long scream on the opening track "Crown of Horns" was notably performed on the album, and occasionally live, by drummer Flo Mounier instead of lead vocalist Lord Worm.

== Artwork ==
The cover art is from a classical painting by Italian Baroque painter Elisabetta Sirani titled Herodias with the Head of John the Baptist. Travis Marmon of Vice noted that Cryptopsy used classical artwork for album artwork "before it became a cliché to do so."

== Reception and legacy ==
Professional ratings
Review scores
Source	Rating
AllMusic	4.5/5 stars
Stylus Magazine	A

None So Vile is regarded as one of the most influential death metal albums of the 1990s, inspiring many later acts and musicians in both the technical death and brutal death metal subgenres. Metal Hammer contended that the album is a "must-have for any extreme metal fan’s collection" and William York of AllMusic called the album "near perfection" by the genre's standards. In congruence, Ultimate Guitar senior editor David Slavković called the album "technical perfection," and expressed his belief that Cryptopsy drummer Flo Mounier could be one of the greatest death metal drummers of all time.

In 2016, Travis Marmon of Vice referred to None So Vile as "32 minutes of arguably the most brutal, technically demanding metal ever made." He said: "This group of high-caliber musicians created something completely savage: a combo of brutality and technicality that few could touch before or since, with a distinct image and theatricality that separated them from the likes of Suffocation or Cannibal Corpse. Along with their more avant-garde contemporaries Gorguts, Cryptopsy set the bar for extreme metal in Quebec. The province has become a tech-death haven in the past two decades, producing bands like Neuraxis and First Fragment, who have pushed the instrumental skill of their forefathers even further. But even beyond eastern Canada, any slam death band who can make music with actual replay value must have None So Vile on heavy rotation."

In 2022, Metal Hammer named None So Vile as one of the greatest metal releases of 1996. The site's staff wrote: "It's impossible to talk about technical death metal without mentioning this second album from Montreal’s Cryptopsy. Sit back and revel in the twisted lyricism of vocalist Lord Worm - served via an unholy torrent of inhuman gutturals and demonic shrieks - whilst the hyper blasts of 'Crown Of Horns' and 'Slit Your Guts' disturbing tremolo picking offset by relentless breakdowns pound your cranium into ruthless submission. Brutal and beautifully chaotic, None So Vile remains the pinnacle in the band's discography and is a must-have for any extreme metal fan’s collection." In 2025, Joe DiVita of Loudwire named None So Vile as the best death metal album of 1996, saying: "This is death metal at its most untamed."

=== Accolades ===
Publication	Country	Accolade	Year	Rank
Decibel	US	The Top 100 Death Metal Albums of All Time	2012	10
Loudwire	US	10 Best Metal Albums of 1996	2016	4

== Track listing ==
All lyrics are written by Lord Worm.

No.	Title	Length
1.	"Crown of Horns"	3:57
2.	"Slit Your Guts"	4:02
3.	"Graves of the Fathers"	4:11
4.	"Dead and Dripping"	3:53
5.	"Benedictine Convulsions"	4:00
6.	"Phobophile"	4:38
7.	"Lichmistress"	2:31
8.	"Orgiastic Disembowelment"	4:51
Total length:		32:03

== Personnel ==
Writing, performance and production credits are adapted from the album liner notes.

=== Cryptopsy ===
- Lord Worm – vocals
- Jon Levasseur – guitar
- Eric Langlois – bass guitar, piano
- Flo Mounier – drums, backing vocals

=== Additional musicians ===
- Eric Fiset – backing vocals
- Steve Thibault – backing vocals

=== Production ===
- Pierre Rémillard – production, engineering
- Co-produced by Cryptopsy

=== Visual art ===
- Elisabetta Sirani (Herodias with the Head of John the Baptist) – cover art
- Flo Mounier – photography
- Simon Marsden – photography
