= Once Was Not =

Studio album by Cryptopsy
- Released: October 18, 2005
- Studio: Vortex, St. Constant, Quebec, Canada
- Genre: Technical death metal
- Length: 49:40
- Language: English, French, German
- Label: Century Media
- Producer: Sebastien Marsan; Cryptopsy

Cryptopsy chronology
...And Then You'll Beg (2000)	Once Was Not (2005)	The Unspoken King (2008)

Embossed digipack slipcover

Professional ratings
Review scores
Source	Rating
AllMusic	3.5/5 stars
Alternative Press	5/5 stars
Blabbermouth	9/10
BW&BK	9/10
Chronicles of Chaos	8.5/10
Stylus Magazine	B+

Once Was Not is the fifth album by Canadian technical death metal band Cryptopsy.

Once Was Not is the first album to feature original vocalist Lord Worm since 1996's None So Vile, and would be his last with the band. It is also the first album not to feature original guitarist Jon Levasseur (Levasseur does however perform a featured appearance on opening track "Luminum").

Unlike previous albums, where Lord Worm's lyrical content consisted of gore, blasphemy, and sex, his lyrics on Once Was Not dealt with topics that affect the human race, such as war, famine, plague, and death.

A digipak edition was released, limited to 10,000 copies, which comes in an embossed digipak with an entirely gold-ink-printed booklet.

A video was filmed for the track "The Pestilence That Walketh in Darkness".

== Track listing ==
No.	Title	Length
1.	"Luminum"	1:45
2.	"In the Kingdom Where Everything Dies, the Sky Is Mortal"	5:21
3.	"Carrionshine"	3:22
4.	"Adeste Infidelis"	4:38
5.	"The Curse of the Great"	5:21
6.	"The Frantic Pace of Dying"	4:33
7.	"Keeping the Cadaver Dogs Busy"	5:58
8.	"Angelskingarden"	7:07
9.	"The Pestilence that Walketh in Darkness (Psalm 91: 5-8)"	3:26
10.	"The End"	2:49
11.	"Endless Cemetery"	5:20
Total length:		49:40

== Personnel ==
=== Cryptopsy ===
- Lord Worm – vocals
- Alex Auburn – guitar, backing vocals
- Eric Langlois – bass guitar
- Flo Mounier – drums, backing vocals

=== Additional personnel ===
- Jon Levasseur – guitar on "Luminium"
- François Quévillon – artwork, design
- Martin Lacroix – artwork, illustration
- Ange E. Curcio – engineering (drums)
- U.E. Nastasi – mastering
- Sébastien Marsan – production, engineering, mixing
- Filip Ivanovic – booklet cover, back cover illustrations
