= Anonymus (band) =

Canadian metal band

- Origin: Montreal, Quebec, Canada
- Genres: Thrash metal
- Years active: 1989–present
- Labels: Galy Records, Disques MPV/Kafka, Productions Rhizome, Bam&Co - Heavy
- Members: Carlos Araya; Daniel Souto; Oscar Souto; Jef Fortin
- Past members: Marco Calliari
- Website: https://www.anonymusmetal.com

Anonymus is a Canadian thrash metal band from Montreal, Quebec, founded in 1989. Its members are Carlos Araya (drums), Oscar Souto (bass and vocals), Daniel Souto (guitar) and Jef Fortin (guitar).

== History ==
The five musicians (the current members plus Marco Calliari) grew up together in Montreal and started their band in high school. In 1992, they independently released the EP The Dream That Lies and, in 1992, the EP Anonymus. In 1994, also independently, they released their first album, Ni Vu, Ni Connu (Not Seen, Not Known).

In 1995, they were signed to the new Montreal label Disques MPV, which paired them with the band Overbass to release the 10-track split Live Crash. In 1996, they re-released Ni Vu, Ni Connu which, despite being all in French, had received excellent reviews. At the 1996 MIMI (Montreal Independent Music Industry) awards, the band won Best Metal/Rock Group.

In 1997, Anonymus released the album Stress, whose songs are in English, Spanish, Italian and French.

In 1998, they played Quebec's Festival Polliwog; their performance was included on the concert's compilation CD.< That November, they toured Mexico with Blind Guardian and, in 1998 and 1999, played the Milwaukee Metalfest. They also toured France with the French metal band Watcha.

In 1999, Anonymus released the album Instinct which, critics noted, was a departure from their earlier music. It was more mainstream, and more English-oriented, and appeared to be an attempt to break in to the American metal scene. 2002's Daemonium, released by Disques MPV's new division Kafka, got very good reviews but this was the last of the band's releases with Disques MPV, which went out of business soon after Daemonium's release.

In 2003, Anonymus collaborated with Quebec satirical singer Serge Robert, aka Mononc' Serge, to record the album L'Académie du massacre, which Robert released independently. They would do this again in 2008, with Robert releasing their joint album Musique Barbare. It was nominated for Best Metal Album at the 2009 GAMIQ Awards.

Their fifth studio album, Chapter Chaos Begins, was released by Galy Records in 2006, to mainly positive reviews.

The band was nominated for a Canadian Music Week Indie Award for Favorite Metal Artist/Group Or Duo of the Year in 2008.

Still without a label, Anonymus decided to release their own music and formed Groupe Anonymus. They released the 2009 compilation album *XX Metal. That was followed in 2011 by État Brute and, in 2015, Envers et contre tous (Against All Odds).

In 2016, Anonymus collaborated with the poets Bertrand Laverdure, Roger Des Roches, Erika Soucy, Thierry Dimanche and Benoît Jutras to create "Poésie Oralité Métal Musique Écrit" (Poetry Orality Metal Written Music). They toured France in support of it, then took park in Ottawa's poetry festival, VERSeFest.

In 2019, Anonymus released the album Sacrifices then, in 2020 and on the new label Bam&Co-Heavy, La Bestia, their first album which is entirely in Spanish (all band members but Fortin are of Chilean descent). It includes one new song and 11 songs from previous albums which the band members translated into Spanish. The concept came from their desire to move into Latin America, South America and Spain. Founding member Marco Calliari left the band in 2003 to pursue a solo career in Worldbeat music but, for this album, he returned to re-record the song "Tierra", which is sung in Spanish and Italian. The album, which was released via livestream, won the 2020 GAMIQ Award for Metal Album of the Year. It also won the first-ever "Piggy Award", named in honour of the late Voivod guitarist Denis D'Amour, aka 'Piggy', and awarded in recognition to those who have forged successful careers in the Quebec music industry.

Aside from the band, Fortin is a producer and the other members have played with several other bands. Oscar Souto is featured in two songs, "Inner Capsule" and "Tunnel Effect" on the Quo Vadis DVD "Defiant Indoctrination", for which he also does guest vocals on the studio versions. The band can be seen in B.A.R.F.'s DVD From The Grave. Carlos is on the drum for half of the show and the band members make an appearance in "Taper Du Pied".

== Discography ==
=== Albums ===
- Ni Vu, Ni Connu (1994), Independent. Reissued 1996.
- Stress (1997), Disques MPV
- Instinct (1999), Disques MPV
- Daemonium (2002), Kafka/Disques MPV
- L'Académie Du Massacre with Serge Robert aka Mononc' Serge (2003), Mononc' Serge Independent
- Chapter Chaos Begins (2006), Galy Records
- Musique Barbare with Serge Robert aka Mononc' Serge (2008), Mononc' Serge Independent
- XX Metal (2009), Groupe Anonymus
- État Brute (2011), Groupe Anonymus
- Envers et contre tous (2015), Groupe Anonymus
- Poesie Oralite Metal Musique Ecrit (2016), Productions Rhizome
- Sacrifices (2019), Groupe Anonymus
- La Bestia (2020), Bam&Co - Heavy

=== EPs ===
- The Dream That Lies (1992), Independent
- Anonymus (1993), Independent
- Live Crash, split with Overbass (1996), Disques MPV
