= Mechanics of Dysfunction =

Studio album by Beneath the Massacre
- Released: February 20, 2007
- Genre: Technical death metal; deathcore
- Length: 29:57
- Label: Prosthetic
- Producer: Yannick St-Ammand

Beneath the Massacre chronology
Evidence of Inequity (2005)	Mechanics of Dysfunction (2007)	Dystopia (2008)

Professional ratings
Review scores
Source	Rating
About.com	3.5/5 stars
Blabbermouth.net	7.5/10 stars
Sputnikmusic	(3/5)

Mechanics of Dysfunction is the debut studio album by Canadian death metal band Beneath the Massacre. It was released on February 20, 2007 through Prosthetic Records.

It was produced by Despised Icon guitarist Yannick St-Ammand.

== Track listing ==
No.	Title	Length
1.	"The Surface"	2:41
2.	"Society′s Disposable Son"	3:28
3.	"The System′s Failure"	3:29
4.	"The Stench of Misery"	2:57
5.	"Untitled"	0:58
6.	"Modern Age Slavery"	3:22
7.	"The Invisible Hand"	3:07
8.	"Better Off Dead"	2:36
9.	"Long Forgotten"	3:33
10.	"Sleepless"	3:46
Total length:		29:57

== Personnel ==
Beneath the Massacre

- Dennis Bradley − bass guitar
- Justin Rousselle − drums
- Christopher Bradley − guitar
- Elliot Desgagnés − vocals

Productions

- Yannick St-Ammand − producing and audio recording
- Alan Douches − audio mastering
- Pierre Rémillard − audio mixing
