= Extracting the Core =

Live album by Martyr
- Released: 2001
- Recorded: Summer 2001 in Rouyn-Noranda, Quebec, Canada
- Genre: Technical death metal
- Length: 41:20
- Label: Skyscraper Music

Martyr chronology
Warp Zone (2000)	Extracting the Core (2001)	Feeding the Abscess (2006)

Professional ratings
Review scores
Source	Rating
Metaluniverse.net	(8/10)
Metal-archives.com	

Extracting the Core is Martyr's only live album. It was recorded in Summer 2001 in Rouyn-Noranda, Canada and was released by Skyscraper Music. The album came in a multimedia disk which contained the songs, live photos, and videos.

== Track list ==
No.	Title	Length
1.	"Warp Zone"	3:05
2.	"Speechless"	5:04
3.	"Inner Peace"	5:18
4.	"Virtual Emotions"	4:20
5.	"Endless Vortex Towards Erasing Destiny"	3:20
6.	"Hopeless Hopes"	5:41
7.	"Retry? Abort? Ignore?"	4:31
8.	"Carpe Diem"	4:24
9.	"Prototype"	5:37

== Personnel ==
Martyr

- Daniel Mongrain – lead vocals, guitar
- Pier-Luc Lampron - guitar
- François Mongrain - bass, death growls
- Patrice Hamelin - drums

Production

- Yannick St-Amand - recording, engineering and mixing
- Fernand Martel - mastering
