= Whisper Supremacy =

Studio album by Cryptopsy
- Released: September 22, 1998
- Recorded: June 1998
- Studios: Victor, Montreal, Quebec, Canada
- Genres: Technical death metal; brutal death metal; progressive metal
- Length: 31:10
- Label: Century Media
- Producers: Pierre Remillard; Cryptopsy

Cryptopsy chronology
None So Vile (1996)	Whisper Supremacy (1998)	...And Then You'll Beg (2000)

Whisper Supremacy is the third studio album by Canadian technical death metal band Cryptopsy, released by Century Media, their first for the label. It is the first Cryptopsy album to not include vocalist Lord Worm, who had left due to health and finance-related reasons. He was replaced by vocalist Mike DiSalvo, while the band also recruited guitarist Miguel Roy for his only album with the band.

On the US release the band logo is in the upper left, whereas on the German (European) release it is larger and centred.

== Background ==
By this point in their career, Cryptopsy had established a following in the Canadian metal underground with their albums Blasphemy Made Flesh and None So Vile. However, due to reasons relating to his health and financial difficulties as a member of the band, original vocalist Lord Worm would depart, becoming an English teacher, teaching the language to adults in the largely French-speaking Quebec province. The band then replaced him with ex-Infestation vocalist Mike DiSalvo, who had been personally approved by Lord Worm.

== Music ==
Aside from Cryptopsy's usual relentless brutal death and technical-infused style that is displayed on the record, Whisper Supremacy has also been noted for its progressive musical elements. The album's mix has been criticized for its guitar lines being quieter in volume compared to the band's first two albums, and was consequently referred to as "all vocals and drums." Daniel Gioffre of AllMusic suggested that the riffs "aren't the focal point," of the album so much as "Cryptopsy's desire for aural devastation." The album demonstrates brief instances of melody with Levasseur's guitar playing being called "conventional."

== Critical reception ==
Professional ratings
Review scores
Source	Rating
AllMusic	4/5 stars

Daniel Gioffre of AllMusic gave the album four stars out of five. He wrote: "Whisper Supremacy is a better album than is apparent upon first listen, as Cryptopsy's progressive tendencies add a pleasing amount of depth to the record. For example, the tricky rhythms of 'Flame to the Surface' or the stop-on-a-dime fits of 'Emaciate' reveal a great deal of thought and precise execution. A fine progressive death metal album from a band at the top of its game."

== Track listing ==
No.	Title	Length
1.	"Emaciate"	5:00
2.	"Cold Hate, Warm Blood"	3:54
3.	"Loathe"	4:53
4.	"White Worms"	3:41
5.	"Flame to the Surface"	3:05
6.	"Depths You've Fallen"	3:58
7.	"Faceless Unknown"	3:19
8.	"Serpent's Coil"	3:18
Total length:		31:10

== Personnel ==
=== Cryptopsy ===
- Mike DiSalvo – vocals
- Jon Levasseur – guitars
- Miguel Roy – guitars
- Eric Langlois – bass guitar
- Flo Mounier – drums, backing vocals

=== Additional personnel ===
- François Quévillon – artwork, design, illustration
- Sébastien Bussières – engineering
- Pierre Rémillard – production
- Annie Grenier – photography
- Lord Worm – additional backing vocals on "Cold Hate, Warm Blood" and "Loathe"
