= Utopia (Unexpect album) =

Studio album by Unexpect
- Released: 1999
- Recorded: 1998
- Genres: Avant-garde metal, black metal, progressive metal, melodic death metal
- Length: 65:34
- Label: self-released
- Producers: Syriak and Unexpect

Unexpect chronology
Utopia (1999)	wE, Invaders (2003)

Utopia is the first full-length album by Canadian avant-garde extreme metal band Unexpect. It was released in 1999 by the band itself and is recorded and mixed by the band with help of Serge Cosette.

Adrian Bromley of Chronicles of Chaos rated it an 8 out of 10.

== Track listing ==
1. "Vespers Gold" – 7:32
2. "Constellations and Mysticism" – 5:37
3. "Metamorphosis" – 2:45
4. "Shades of a Forbidden Passion" – 6:44
5. "Palace of Dancing Souls" – 2:54
6. "The Fall of Arthrone" – 7:28
7. "Ethereal Dimensions" – 7:46
8. "The Flames of Knowledge Forever Lost" – 7:16
9. "In Velvet Coffins We Sleep" – 8:53
10. "The Revival" – 8:34

== Personnel ==
- syriaK – vocals, guitar
- Zircon – bass guitar
- Lunorin (Exod) – drums
- Merzenya - keyboard
- Le bateleur – violin
- Artagoth - vocals, guitar
- Elda – vocals
