= Evidence of Inequity =

EP by Beneath the Massacre
- Released: May 31, 2005
- Recorded: Victor Studio in 2004
- Genre: Technical death metal, deathcore
- Length: 17:03
- Label: Galy
- Producer: Yannick St-Amand

Beneath the Massacre chronology
Evidence of Inequity (2005)	Mechanics of Dysfunction (2007)

Evidence of Inequity is an EP by Canadian death metal band Beneath the Massacre. It was released on May 31, 2005, through Galy Records. This EP was recorded and mixed at Victor Studio by Yannick St-Amand and mastered by Alan Douches at West West Side Studio in 2005. The lyrics of the album deal with subjects such as politics and social inequality.

== Track listing ==
No.	Title	Length
1.	"Comforting Prejudice"	2:32
2.	"Profitable Killcount"	3:21
3.	"Totalitarian Hypnosis"	3:04
4.	"Regurgitated Lullaby for the Born Dead"	4:00
5.	"Nevermore"	4:06
Total length:		17:03

== Personnel ==
- Elliot Desgagnés – vocals
- Christopher Bradley – guitar
- Dennis Bradley – bass
- Justin Rousselle – drums
- Christian Pépin – guitar
