= Southcoast247 =

- Editor-in-chief: Jamie Despres, 2004-2008; Raleigh Dugal (2008–2009)
- Frequency: Monthly
- Publisher: SouthCoast Media Group
- Total circulation: 5,000 (60,000)
- First issue: September 2007
- Final issue: January 2009
- Company: SouthCoast Media Group
- Country: United States
- Based in: New Bedford, Massachusetts
- Language: English
- Website: southcoast247.com

Southcoast247, a subsidiary of the SouthCoast Media Group, is an arts & entertainment magazine and online web site based in New Bedford, Massachusetts.

== Online ==
Southcoast247.com launched on October 4, 2004 to "fill in the gap for a comprehensive Arts & Entertainment site to serve the 18- to 34-year-old demographic of the SouthCoast region of Massachusetts." Southcoast247.com covers a wide spectrum of entertainment, both locally and nationally, including music, movies, technology, arts, sports, and fashion. In July 2009, its staff was liquidated. Today, the South Coast Media Group largely uses the brand to recycle mainstream media content.

=== Online Awards ===
- 2005: Best Web Site Idea, Circulation 20,001 - 60,000, New England Newspaper Advertising Executives Association, Advertising Awards.
- 2008: Finalist for Best Local Guide or Entertainment Site, Circulation Less Than 75,000 — The Newspaper Association of America.
- 2008: CoolHomePages Design Award in Entertainment, Color Schemes, Ezine, Usability, and Very Clean categories.

== Print ==
The first issue of Southcoast247 PRINT was released in September 2007. The magazine was a free monthly publication available in 12 Southeastern Massachusetts towns and cities.

In January 2009, Southcoast247 PRINT was cancelled due to budget cuts. Southcoast247 is now a web portal used to recycle South Coast Today content.
