= Coprofago =

Chilean technical death metal band

- Origin: Santiago, Chile
- Genres: Technical death metal Thrash metal (early)
- Years active: 1993–present
- Label: Candlelight
- Members: Pablo Alvarez; Felipe Castro; Marcelo Ruiz; Sebastián Vergara
- Past members: Rodrigo Castro; Pablo Solari; Ignacio Suit
- Website: www.coprofago.com

Coprofago is a technical death metal band that Sebastián Vergara, Pablo Alvarez, Pablo Solari and Ignacio Suit formed in Santiago, Chile, in June 1993. The name of the band is taken from the Greek "copro" ("feces") and "fago" ("eat").

== Biography ==
Coprofago was formed while all founding members were in school. They recorded a standard death metal demo that sold out immediately, attracting the attention of some magazines in Chile, but generally without good reviews. With the addition of Marcelo Ruiz on drums and Felipe Castro on bass guitar, the band released Images of Despair in 1997. Genesis, released in 2000, attracted more attention. They were invited to share the stage with death metal band Krisiun, local band Criminal, and other Chilean bands. A growing reputation and praise from bands like Atheist, Darkane and Watchtower led to a deal with French record label Sekhmet, which released Genesis in Europe.

A few weeks before the European release, Ruiz and Solari moved to Sweden, which gave the band to a period of inactivity until mid-2003, when they started to write music for their following album, Unorthodox Creative Criteria, released in July 2005. The album was a mix of death metal and progressive rock, bordering on jazz fusion.

The band released a remixed version of 2002's Genesis as Genesis 22 in 2022.

== Band members ==
=== Current members ===
- Pablo Alvarez – vocals, guitar, keyboards (1993–2005, 2014–present), bass (1998, 2003–2004)
- Sebastián Vergara – vocals, guitar, keyboards (1993–2005, 2014–present)
- Marcelo Ruiz – drums (1995–2005, 2014–present)
- Rodrigo Castro – bass (2000–2003, 2014–present)

=== Former members ===
- Felipe Castro – bass (1998–1999, 2004–2005)
- Pablo Solari – bass (1993–1998)
- Ignacio Suit – drums (1993–1995)

== Discography ==
- Images of Despair (1999)
- Genesis (2000)
- Unorthodox Creative Criteria (2005)
- Genesis 22 (2022)
