= Unexpect =

Canadian extreme metal band

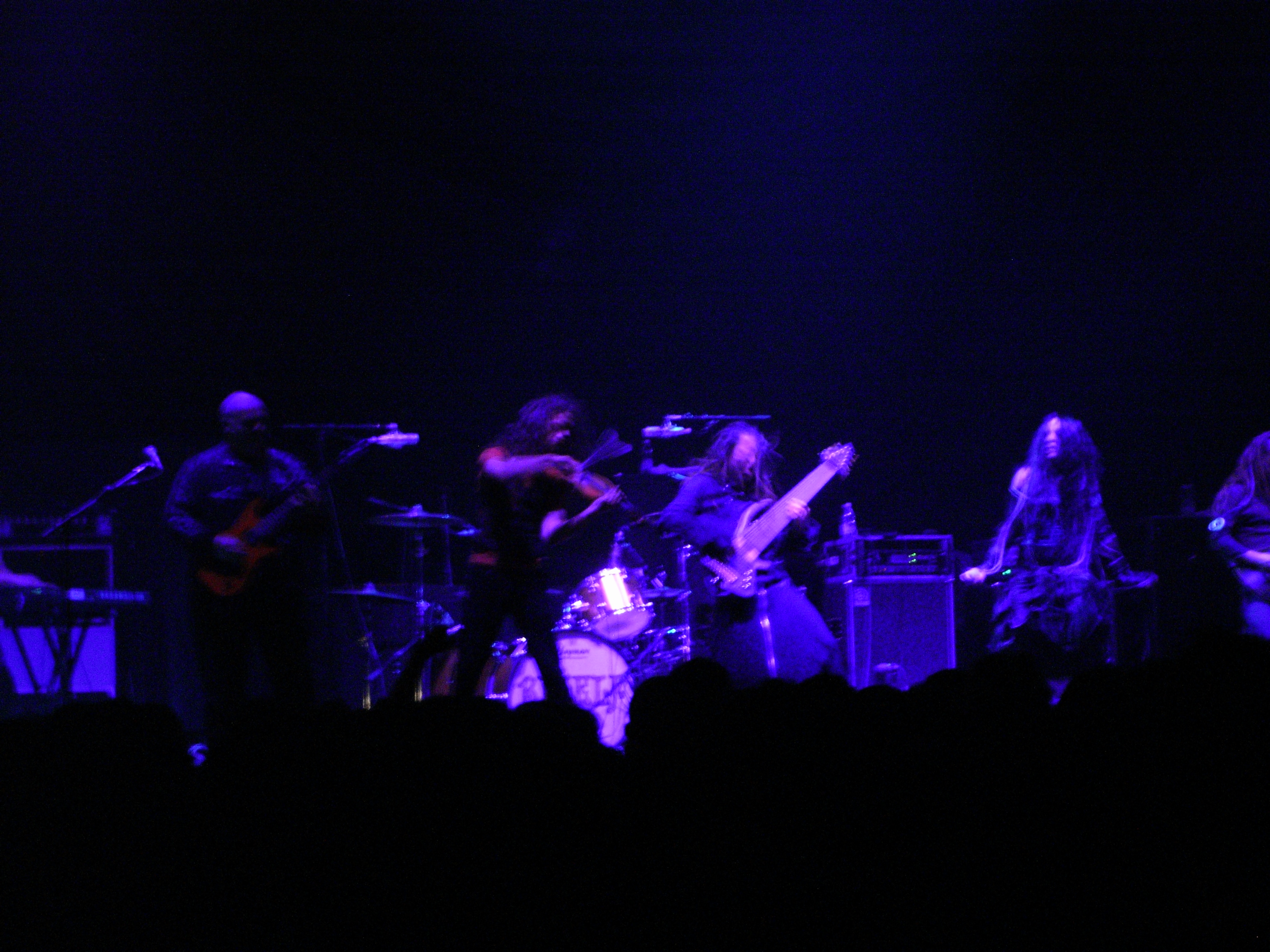
- Unexpect on the Progressive Nation European tour in 2009

Background information
- Origin: Montréal, Québec, Canada
- Genres: Avant-garde metal, extreme metal
- Years active: 1996–2015
- Labels: The End, Galy Records
- Members: Syriak; Artagoth; ChaotH; Leïlindel; Landryx; Blaise Borboën-Léonard
- Past members: ExoD; Le Bateleur; Elda; Zircon; Merzenya; Dasnos; Anthony Trujillo

Unexpect (often stylized as uneXpect, unexpecT, and UnexpecT) was a Canadian avant-garde extreme metal band from Montréal, featuring an amalgamation of progressive metal, death metal, black metal, melodic heavy metal, and other styles including European classical, medieval, opera, gypsy jazz, electro, ambient, noise, and circus music.

The band's debut album, Utopia, was independently released. With unorthodox distribution and online support, the album sold successfully. They released their two following albums via The End Records, before returning to independent releases.

== History ==
Two of the founding members had a long tenure with the band: Artagoth and SyriaK. Unexpect recorded their first album, Utopia, in 1998, and released it in 1999 independently. The 2003 EP _We, Invaders was released in November 2003 on the Canadian label Galy Records. They then signed with New York-based The End Records and the band's second album In a Flesh Aquarium was released on August 22, 2006, in North America. Unexpect released their third album, Fables of the Sleepless Empire, on May 31, 2011. The band won the 7th annual Independent Music Awards Vox Pop vote for best Hard Rock/Metal Album with In a Flesh Aquarium.

On August 22, 2015, after the band had been inactive for almost three years, and with few updates, an announcement was made on their official Facebook page stating the members had decided to disband for good and pursue their own personal musical endeavours.

== Members ==
Last line-up

- Eryk "Syriak" Chapados – lead vocals, guitar (1996–2015) (ex-Ekinox, ex-Magister Dixit)
- Stéphane "Artagoth" English – lead vocals, guitar (1996–2015)
- Roxanne "Leïlindel" Hegyesy – lead vocals (2001–2015)
- Frédérick "ChaotH" Filiatrault – bass (2001–2015) (Humanoid)
- Landryx – drums (2004–2015) (ex-Decadawn, ex-Eclipse Prophecy)
- Blaise Borboën-Léonard – violin (2007–2015)

Session members

- Nathalie Duchesne – additional violin, cello (2003–2015)
- Stéphanie Colerette – additional violin, cello (2003–2015)
- Amélie Blanchette – clarinet (2006–2015)

Former members

- Véronique "Elda" Michaud – lead vocals (1996–2001)
- Mathieu "Zircon" Phaneuf – bass (1996–2001)
- Olivier "Merzenya" Genest – keyboards (1996–2001)
- Anthony Trujillo – drums (2002)
- Dasnos – drums (2003)
- Charles "Le Bateleur" Crépeau – violin (1996–2006)
- Stéphane "ExoD" Primeau – drums (1996–2002), keyboards, piano, sampling (2002–2010)

== Discography ==
- Utopia (1999, self-released)
- _wE, Invaders EP (2003, Galy Records; distributed by The End Records)
- In a Flesh Aquarium (2006, The End Records)
- Fables of the Sleepless Empire (2011, self-released)
