= Martyr (band) =

Canadian death metal band

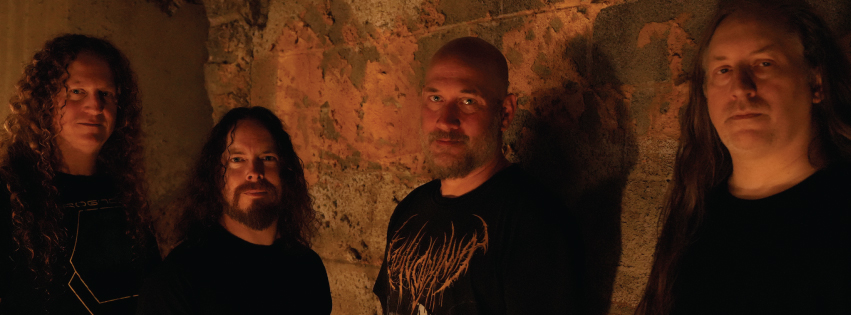
- Martyr in 2024

Background information
- Origin: Trois-Rivières, Quebec, Canada
- Genres: Technical death metal, death metal
- Years active: 1989–2012, 2023–present
- Label: Relapse Records (license)
- Members: Daniel Mongrain; Martin Carbonneau; François Mongrain; Patrice Hamelin
- Past members: Pier-Luc Lampron; François Richard
- Website: www.martyr-canada.com

Martyr is a Canadian extreme metal band from Trois-Rivières, Québec. Their style consists of progressive use of melodics and variations of thrash and death metal. In June 2026, Martyr announced the remixed and remastered reissues of their first three studio albums on Relapse Records.

== History ==
Martyr is a Canadian technical death metal band formed in 1989 by brothers Daniel Mongrain (guitar, lead vocals) and François Mongrain (bass, lead and backing vocals). Guitarist Pier-Luc Lampron joined the band in 1993. Martyr recorded a demo tape in September 1995, Ostrogoth. Drummer François Richard joined the band in 1996 and left 1997, replaced with Patrice Hamelin. In November 1997, the band self-released its debut full-length album, Hopeless Hopes.

Martyr self-released their second album, Warp Zone, in 2000, and a live album, Extracting the Core 2001, a year later.

In 2006, the band released a third studio album, Feeding the Abscess. In 2008, the band released the DVD Havoc in Quebec City.

Daniel Mongrain joined Voivod in 2008, under the nickname "Chewy".

Martyr went on hiatus in 2012 due to internal disagreements.

The band reformed in 2023 and headlined the Trois-Rivières Metalfest in November, playing their second album, Warp Zone, in full.

In June 2026, Martyr announced the remixed and remastered reissues of their first three studio albums on Relapse Records.

== Band members ==
Current

- Daniel Mongrain (1989–2012, 2023-present) – guitar, lead vocals
- François Mongrain (1989–2012, 2023-present) – bass, backing vocals, death growls
- Patrice Hamelin (1997–2012, 2023-present) – drums
- Martin Carbonneau (2002–2012, 2023-present) – guitar

Former

- François Richard (1996–1997) – drums
- Pier-Luc Lampron (1993–2001) – guitar
- Éric Beauchemin (1989–1992) – guitar
- Martin Alarie (1993-1994) – drums
- Stéphane Bélanger (1991-1992, 1994–1995) – drums
- Guylaine Boucher (1992) – guitar

== Discography ==
=== Studio albums ===
- Hopeless Hopes (1997)
- Warp Zone (2000)
- Feeding the Abscess (2006)

=== Live albums ===
- Extracting the Core (2001)

=== Video albums ===
- Havoc in Quebec City DVD (2008)
