= Blasphemy Made Flesh =

Studio album by Cryptopsy
- Released: November 25, 1994
- Recorded: April 1994
- Studios: Piranha Studio, Montreal
- Genres: Brutal death metal; technical death metal
- Length: 39:42
- Label: Invasion
- Producer: Cryptopsy

Cryptopsy chronology
Ungentle Exhumation (1993)	Blasphemy Made Flesh (1994)	None So Vile (1996)

Alternative cover
- Century Media reissue

Blasphemy Made Flesh is the debut album by Canadian death metal band Cryptopsy, released on November 25, 1994 through Invasion Records. It was re-released in 1997 by Displeased Records, and in 2001 by Century Media with a different cover. The album was recorded at Piranha Studio in Montreal. It is the only album to feature bassist Martin Fergusson.

== Background ==
Cryptopsy was originally formed as the band Obsessive Compulsive Disorder in 1988, eventually renaming to Necrosis, then Gomorrah, and later Cryptopsy. The band would release numerous demos in the years following their formation, including Ungentle Exhumation, which would catch the attention of local labels and lead to them eventually being signed.

== Music ==
These songs are essentially linear, as each riff is run through a variety of tempos before undergoing a slight mutation to carry the song forward. Then, a new musical idea is introduced suddenly through a stuttering transition or a slapped bassline.

— Todd Nief of AllMusic

The music on Blasphemy Made Flesh has been described as "sophisticated" and as having an "off-kilter personality." Its style has been described as a more "maniacal" and "chaotic" approach to the "technical, percussive" style of Suffocation. The album contains many tempo changes, and has been noted for its "extreme speed". Todd Nief of AllMusic described the musicianship as "technically impressive, but occasionally sloppy in an almost punk way," and music journalist T Coles assessed that the band "uses the momentum to elevate their ideas from complex to just plain overwhelming." The guitar and bass work has been described as "complex and dramatic". Lord Worm's vocal style on the album incorporates death growls and high shrieks. His vocal performance has been described as "all over the place," and his choices of vocal rhythms to punctuate phrases as "awkward". The album also contains melodic guitar riffs that have drawn comparisons to Iron Maiden.

== Reception ==
Professional ratings
Review scores
Source	Rating
AllMusic	4/5 stars

Todd Nief of AllMusic said, "The switch between technical death metal, rhythmic pounding, and sped-up Iron Maiden riffing is occasionally jarring, but this album "works" as a whole. Cryptopsy's ear for catchy rhythm and desire to push the boundaries of an aesthetic make Blasphemy Made Flesh a resounding success."

== Track listing ==
- All songs written and arranged by Cryptopsy.

No.	Title	Length
1.	"Defenestration"	4:32
2.	"Abigor"	3:52
3.	"Open Face Surgery"	4:25
4.	"Serial Messiah"	4:01
5.	"Born Headless"	4:29
6.	"Swine of the Cross"	3:06
7.	"Gravaged (A Cryptopsy)"	2:47
8.	"Memories of Blood"	3:34
9.	"Mutant Christ"	4:21
10.	"Pathological Frolic"	4:35
Total length:		39:42

== Personnel ==
=== Cryptopsy ===
- Lord Worm – vocals
- Jon Levasseur – lead and rhythm guitars
- Steve Thibault – rhythm guitar, backing vocals
- Martin Fergusson – bass
- Flo Mounier – drums, backing vocals, photography, logo art

=== Additional personnel ===
- François Quévillon – cover art (original cover)
- Jacky Mounier – photography
- Rod "The God" Shearer – engineering
- Kevin Weagle – design
