= The Immortal Wars =

2017 studio album by Ex Deo

Studio album by Ex Deo
- Released: 24 February 2017
- Recorded: June–September 2016
- Genre: Symphonic death metal
- Length: 38:21
- Label: Napalm Records

Ex Deo chronology
Caligvla (2012)	The Immortal Wars (2017)	The Thirteen Years of Nero (2021)

Professional ratings
Review scores
Source	Rating
Ghost Cult Magazine	8.5/10
Maximum Volume Music	10/10

The Immortal Wars is the third album by Canadian death metal band Ex Deo, released on 24 February 2017.

== Background and release ==
Ex Deo first announced its third album on 27 October 2015, continuing to work on it as going on hiatus for a year and a half. They began the writing process in late 2015. Carach Angren keyboardist Clemens Wijers was announced to handle orchestrations for the album. On 4 January 2016 the band revealed the new album's title The Immortal Wars.

In June 2016, the band began to record for the album, with mixing scheduled for September and its release scheduled for February 2017. In November 2016, the band revealed the final track listing, artwork, and release date of The Immortal Wars. The album was mixed by Jens Bogren, known for his work with Amon Amarth, Kreator, and Arch Enemy, and the artwork was made by Eliran Kantor, known for working with Testament, Hatebreed, Kataklysm, and Fleshgod Apocalypse.

In December 2016, the band announced the release of the song "The Rise of Hannibal". On 10 February 2017, two weeks before the album's release, they uploaded a music video for "The Roman" on YouTube, where it was age-restricted due to scenes of violence, sex, and nudity.

== Track listing ==
No.	Title	Length
1.	"The Rise of Hannibal"	4:49
2.	"Hispania (The Siege of Saguntum)"	5:51
3.	"Crossing of the Alps"	5:30
4.	"Suavetaurilia (Intermezzo)"	1:47
5.	"Cato Major: Carthago Delenda Est!"	4:50
6.	"Ad Victoriam (The Battle of Zama)"	5:35
7.	"The Spoils of War"	4:00
8.	"The Roman"	5:59

== Personnel ==
Ex Deo

- Maurizio Iacono – vocals, composer, lyricist
- Stéphane Barbe – lead guitar
- Jean-Francois Dagenais – rhythm guitar, engineer
- Dano Apekian – bass guitar
- Oli Beaudoin – drums, engineer

Guests

- Clemens Wijers – keyboards, orchestration

Additional personnel

- Eliran Kantor – cover art
- Ocvlta Designs – cover layout
- Jens Bogren – mixing, mastering
