= The Thirteen Years of Nero =

2021 studio album by Ex Deo

Studio album by Ex Deo
- Released: 27 August 2021
- Recorded: 2021
- Genre: Symphonic death metal
- Length: 48:32
- Label: Napalm Records
- Producer: Jean-Francois Dagenais

Ex Deo chronology
The Immortal Wars (2017)	The Thirteen Years of Nero (2021)

Professional ratings
Review scores
Source	Rating
Metal Injection	8/10
Sonic Perspective	8.1/10

The Thirteen Years of Nero is the fourth album by Canadian death metal band Ex Deo, released on 27 August 2021.

== Release and promotion ==
On June 14, 2021, Ex Deo announced its fourth album, The Thirteen Years of Nero, about the Roman Emperor Nero, with Carach Angren keyboardist Clemens Wijers handling orchestrations once again for the album. In the months between the album's announcement and release, the band uploaded music videos for the songs "Imperator", "Boudicca (Queen Of The Iceni)" (featuring Unleash the Archers vocalist Brittney Slayes), and "The Head of the Snake".

== Track listing ==
No.	Title	Length
1.	"The Fall of Claudius"	6:32
2.	"Imperator"	4:07
3.	"The Head of the Snake"	4:05
4.	"Boudicca (Queen of the Iceni)"	5:06
5.	"Britannia: The 9th at Camulodonum"	4:37
6.	"Trial of the Gods (Intermezzo)"	2:57
7.	"The Fiddle & the Fire"	5:00
8.	"Son of the Deified"	5:13
9.	"What Artist Dies in Me..."	6:13
10.	"The Revolt of Galba"	4:42

== Personnel ==
Ex Deo

- Maurizio Iacono – vocals, lyricist
- Stéphane Barbe – lead guitar
- Jean-Francois Dagenais – rhythm guitar, engineer, mixing, mastering, producer
- Dano Apekian – bass guitar
- Jeramie Kling – drums, recording

Guests

- Clemens Wijers – keyboards, orchestration
- Brittney Slayes – vocals on track 4

Additional personnel

- Seth Siro Anton – cover art
- Ocvlta Designs – cover layout
