= Johann Konrad Dippel =

German theologian and alchemist (1673–1734)

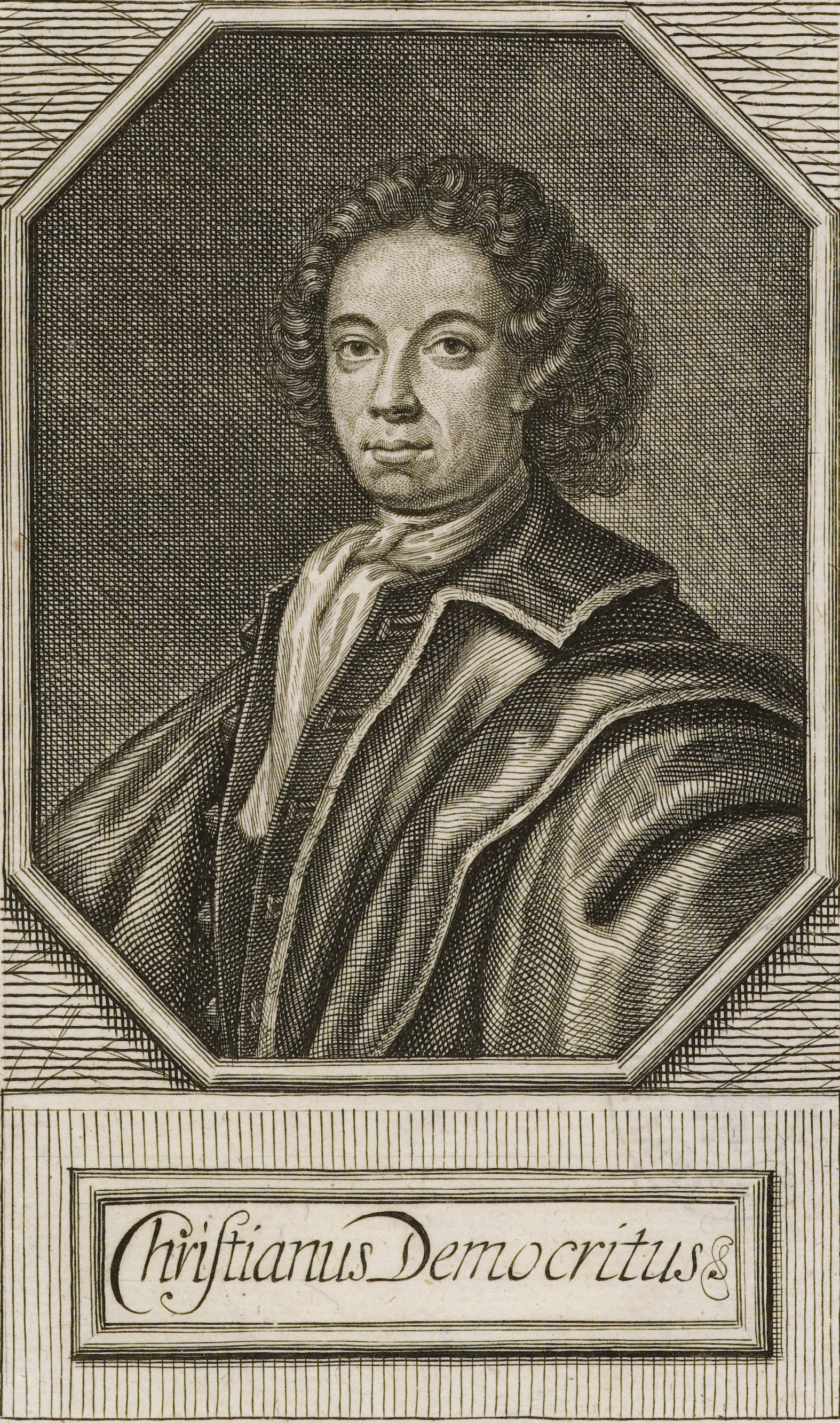
Johann Konrad Dippel

Johann Konrad Dippel, also spelled Johann Conrad Dippel (10 August 1673 – 25 April 1734), was a German Pietist theologian, physician, and alchemist.

== Life ==
Dippel was born at Castle Frankenstein near Mühltal and Darmstadt, thus, when he entered school, the addendum Franckensteinensis was attached to his name, and once at university, the addendum Franckensteina-Strataemontanus was used.

He studied theology, philosophy and alchemy at the University of Giessen, obtaining a master's degree in theology in 1693. He published many theological works under the name Christianus Demócritus, and most of them are still preserved. Around 1700, he turned to Hermetic studies and alchemy as a key to nature. Between 1700 and 1702, he engaged in a bitter dispute with the Reformed Court Preacher Conrad Broeske in Offenbach, with whom he shared millenarian hopes for soon-coming renewal in Christendom. He accused Broeske of compromise and collusion with the authorities after Broeske refused to publish Dippel's "The Scourging Papacy of the Protestants" on the Offenbach press.

Dippel's reputation as a controversial theologian earned him both defenders and enemies throughout all of Europe. Emanuel Swedenborg was probably both his most notable supporter and, later, staunch critic: Swedenborg began as a disciple of Dippel, but eventually dismissed him as a "most vile devil ... who attempted wicked things." Swedenborg clarified that he was at first enamored by Dippel's emotionally charged writings and agreed with his attempts to dissolve traditional churches for a more personal faith and rejection of the Bible as the literal Word of God; however, he eventually criticized Dippel as "bound to no principles, but was in general opposed to all, whoever they may be, of whatever principle or faith ... becoming angry with any one for contradicting him." Swedenborg went so far as to suggest that Dippel was merely a cultish opportunist who used his theological charisma for his own financial gain and social influence, actively leading people away from traditional faith in order to "take away all their intelligence of truth and good, and leaving them in a kind of delirium."

Dippel led an adventurous life, often getting into trouble because of his disputed opinions and his problems with managing money. He was eventually imprisoned for heresy, where he served a seven-year sentence. He created an animal oil known as "Dippel's oil," which was supposed to be the equivalent to the alchemists' dream of the "elixir of life." At one point, Dippel attempted to purchase Castle Frankenstein in exchange for his elixir formula, which he claimed he had recently discovered; the offer was turned down.

According to Stahl, Dippel and the pigment maker Diesbach used potassium carbonate contaminated with this oil in producing red dyes. To their surprise, they obtained a blue pigment "Berliner Blau," also called "Preussisch Blau" or "Prussian blue."

There are claims that during his stay at Castle Frankenstein, he practiced alchemy and anatomy. He was allegedly working with nitroglycerin, which led to the destruction of a tower at the Castle Frankenstein. But this seems to be a modern myth, for it is an anachronism. Nitroglycerin hadn't been discovered in Dippel's time. And although the history of the castle during Dippel's lifetime is well documented, the destruction of a tower—though surely a remarkable event—is nowhere mentioned.

Other rumours about Dippel appear to be modern inventions, too. For example, that which said he performed experiments with cadavers, in which he attempted to transfer the soul of one cadaver into another. Soul-transference with cadavers was a common experiment among alchemists at the time and was a theory that Dippel supported in his writings, thus making it possible that Dippel pursued similar objectives, but there is no direct evidence to link him to these specific acts. There is also no evidence to the rumour that he was driven out of town when word of his activities reached the ears of the townspeople—though he was often banned from countries, notably Sweden, for his controversial theological positions. He also eventually had to flee to Giessen after killing a man in a duel.

Dippel did, however, experiment quite frequently with dead animals, of which he was an "avid dissector." In his dissertation Maladies and Remedies of the Life of the Flesh, Dippel claims to have discovered both the elixir of life and the means to exorcize demons through potions that he concocted from boiled animal bones and flesh. This is the same essay in which Dippel claimed to believe that souls could be transferred from one corpse to another by using a funnel.

Some of Dippel's contemporaries, notably Johann Heinrich Jung, believed that toward the end of his life, Dippel lost his faith altogether after years of bitter disputes with other Christian leaders. Calling Christ "an indifferent being," Dippel shifted all of his energy exclusively on his alchemical experiments. He set up a lab near Wittgenstein (which was eventually converted into a pub named after him, Dippelshof), and at this point in his life historical records are vague on his activities and thus grew folkloric in nature. During this time, at least one local minister apparently accused Dippel of grave-robbing, experimenting on cadavers, and keeping company with the Devil. For the most part, Dippel kept to himself and his work; he perhaps even actively perpetuated the rumours that he had sold his soul to the Devil in exchange for secret knowledge, as relying on his reputation as a dark sorcerer better enabled him to find audiences with those willing to pay for his knowledge of the philosopher's stone and the elixir of life.

He died at Castle Wittgenstein near Bad Laasphe, probably from a stroke, though some contemporaries suspected poisoning. A year before his death, he wrote a pamphlet in which he claimed to have discovered an elixir that would keep him alive until the age of 135.

== Connection to the novel Frankenstein; or, The Modern Prometheus ==
Dippel's connection to the Castle Frankenstein gave rise to the theory that he was a model for Mary Shelley's 1818 novel Frankenstein; or, The Modern Prometheus, although that idea remains controversial. This hypothesis was probably first suggested by Radu Florescu in his book In Search of Frankenstein (1975), which speculated that Shelley (then Mary Godwin) visited the castle during her travels on the Rhine with Percy Shelley, where they might have heard local stories about Dippel, which by then would have grown legendary and notorious. Florescu also notes that the Shelleys reference a brief interaction while touring the countryside around Castle Frankenstein with students of the University of Strasbourg, of which Dippel was once a student; these students could have told them stories about the infamous alumnus. In addition, the Shelleys knew several members of the so-called "Kreis der Empfindsamen," a literary circle that met in Darmstadt from 1769 to 1773; Castle Frankenstein was frequently used as a location for their public readings, thus making it possible that Dippel's legends could have come up during conversations between those in the circle and the Shelleys.

A local historian, Walter Scheele, believes that the legends told in the villages surrounding the castle were transmitted by Jacob Grimm to Mary Jane Clairmont, translator of Grimm's fairy tales and stepmother of Mary Wollstonecraft Godwin. Scheele also claims that, in 1814, Mary, her stepsister Claire Clairmont, and Percy Bysshe Shelley are said to have visited Castle Frankenstein, on their way to Lake Geneva. Other historians, whether their field of research is Grimm, Shelley, or the Castle Frankenstein, do not see any evidence for this. Scheele's claimed letter of Grimm is nowhere to be found. And no evidence can be found that Clairmont was considered the translator for Grimm's Fairy Tales.

Several nonfiction books on the life of Mary Shelley also confirm Dippel as a possible influence. In particular, Miranda Seymour finds it curious that Mary speaks of "gods [making entirely] new men" in her journal so soon after her travels through the regions surrounding Castle Frankenstein; if rumors indeed existed throughout the area that Dippel experimented on cadavers in an attempt to create life, Seymour argues, Mary's phrasing could be more than merely coincidental. In his book Frankenstein: The First 200 Years, Christopher Frayling refers to a passage in Mary's diaries later in her life in which she expresses a desire to return to the region surrounding Castle Frankenstein to take in more of its folklore—implying that she is already familiar with at least some of the local legends. For now, however, the connection remains a subject of an ongoing debate.

=== Later Dippel–Frankenstein connections ===
Regardless of the historical validity of the connection, however, Dippel's status as Frankenstein's prototype seems assured in current popular culture (similar to Count Dracula's equally controversial interchangeability with the historical Vlad the Impaler). In addition to Florescu's speculative work, the Dippel/Frankenstein merging has appeared in several works of fiction: Robert Anton Wilson's fantasy novel The Earth Will Shake features Dippel as a monster-making, globe-hopping magician who calls himself Frankenstein; the science fiction novel The Frankenstein Murders portrays Dippel as an assistant to Victor Frankenstein; Topps' three-part comic book miniseries The Frankenstein-Dracula War lists Dippel as one of Dr. Frankenstein's chief inspirations; Warren Ellis's graphic novel Frankenstein's Womb hypothesizes that Shelley indeed visited Castle Frankenstein and heard of Dippel before writing her famous work; Christopher Farnsworth's debut novel Blood Oath features a vampire trying to stop an immortal Dippel (who had once worked for Adolf Hitler) from creating a Frankenstein-like army; G.M.S. Altman's novel Dippel's Oil features a kindhearted Dippel living in modern times, bemused at his influence on the Frankenstein myth; Larry Correia's novel Monster Hunter Vendetta makes reference to Dippel as the creator of an enigmatic character, 'Agent Franks'; Kenneth Oppel's 2011 novel This Dark Endeavor: The Apprenticeship of Victor Frankenstein includes several homages to Shelley's influences, including the naming of Victor Frankenstein's twin brother Konrad, after the alchemist; Stan Major's novel Rimms of Khaos features Dippel as an immortal criminal mastermind, forced to make Frankensteinian monsters for a master vampire bent on world domination. Johann Dippel is mad-doctor Lord Hervey's hero in the Frankenstein Chronicles TV series, and Dippel's reanimated son becomes Hervey's partner in crime. Also more recently in Jeanette Winterson's 2019 novel Frankissstein, which dramatizes the Shelleys' visit to Castle Frankenstein, where they hear the story of Conrad Dippel's determination to learn the secret of life in order to reanimated his beloved deceased wife.

== In popular culture ==
Johann Dippel is mentioned as the teacher of one of the characters in the episode "Lost and Found" of the TV series The Frankenstein Chronicles (2015). In season 2, Laurence Fox plays Dippel's son, who is involved in resurrections, but he is not mentioned as having met the Shelleys.

Dippel appears as a minor character in Larry Correia's Monster Hunter series of novels as Konrad Dippel. He is credited with the creation of the Frankenstein monster, and contrary to Mary Shelley's novel, he is credited with teaching the monster human mannerisms and the German language.

Dutch symphonic black metal band Carach Angren released a concept album inspired by Dippel, titled Franckensteina Strataemontanus, in 2020.

== See also ==
- Animism
- Astral projection
- Dippel's oil
- Frankenstein
- Frankenstein Castle
- List of alchemists
- Necromancy
- Spiritualism
