= Christ Church Parish =

Christ Church Parish may refer to:

- Christ Church parish, Barbados
- Christ Church Parish Church, Oistins, Christ Church, Barbados
- Old Christ Church, Pensacola, Florida
