= The Chase Vault Tragedy =

Demo album by Carach Angren
- Released: 1 September 2004
- Recorded: by Carach Angren at Carachvan-studios August 2004
- Genre: Symphonic black metal
- Length: 12:35
- Label: Independent
- Producer: Carach Angren

Carach Angren chronology
The Chase Vault Tragedy (2004)	Ethereal Veiled Existence (2005)

The Chase Vault Tragedy is the first demo by Dutch symphonic black metal band Carach Angren. The CD was released on 1 September 2004; it is a concept album about the mystery of the burial vault of Chase Vault in Barbados. Pro-printed CD-R comes without back cover artwork. It was limited to 100 copies.

== Track listing ==
- All music and impressions by Carach Angren 2003/2004
- All lyrics by Seregor

No.	Title	Length
1.	"In Death It Began... (Intro)" (Instrumental)	1:08
2.	"The Chase Vault Mystery"	3:46
3.	"Paranormal Kinetic Activity"	4:09
4.	"Sepulchral Disequilibrium"	3:32
Total length:		12:35

== Personnel ==
- Dennis "Seregor" Droomers – vocals and guitars
- Clemens "Ardek" Wijers – keyboards and piano, backing vocals
- Ivo "Namtar" Wijers – drums and percussion
