= This Is No Fairytale =

Studio album by Carach Angren
- Released: 23 February 2015
- Recorded: Tidalwave Studios
- Genre: Symphonic black metal
- Length: 44:16
- Label: Season of Mist
- Producer: Patrick Damiani, Carach Angren

Carach Angren chronology
Where the Corpses Sink Forever (2012)	This Is No Fairytale (2015)	Dance and Laugh Amongst the Rotten (2017)

This Is No Fairytale is the fourth studio album by Dutch symphonic black metal band Carach Angren. It was released on 23 February 2015 via Season of Mist. The witch's hand on the cover art of the album is actually the hand of Dennis "Seregor" Droomers' grandmother.

== Plot ==
The album is a modern interpretation of the Hansel and Gretel fairy tale with themes of domestic abuse, drug addiction, alcoholism, sexual child abuse, suicide, child abduction and cannibalism.

A violent alcoholic father and heroin-addicted mother have two children. One night, following a parental dispute, the father sexually abuses his daughter. Four nights later, while the father is beating his wife, the children attempt to run away but are recaptured by the father. The father violently beats the children for trying to escape. After her beating the daughter finds her mother's body, who committed suicide by cutting her wrists. The children attempt to escape again while the father is asleep. This time the children successfully escape only to be drugged and abducted by a man dressed as a clown who promised them a house made of gingerbread and gave them sweets. The clown is a serial killer who hears a voice in his head he calls "The Witch". This voice convinces him to make a ritual sacrifice of the boy. After dismembering the boy the clown makes the girl bury the boy's body parts and clean the mess made during the killing. The clown and the girl then eat a meal together after which the clown reveals the food was made from the boy's heart. The clown plans to keep the girl as a slave until the witch asks for another sacrifice. While in captivity the girl considers suicide but chooses escape or die fighting. During another meal she stabs the clown in the throat with a fork and smashes a bottle of wine on his head. As the clown falls he knocks over a kerosene lantern, setting the room on fire. The girl escapes, leaving the clown to burn, but in her panic runs into a tree and knocks herself out. When she regains consciousness she is in an otherworldly place with twisted trees, ghostly clouds and a toxic blood sky. In this place the girl believes to be purgatory she meets the clown again, now heavily burned. As the clown grabs her and holds his hand over her mouth the smell of his burned flesh turns to alcohol. The girl realizes she has been dreaming to escape the reality of her father's abuse.

== Track listing ==
- All music by Carach Angren.
- Main compositions by Ardek. All lyrics by Seregor.
- All guitars written by Seregor and recorded by Patrick Damiani.

No.	Title	Length
1.	"Once Upon a Time..." (Instrumental)	1:36
2.	"There's No Place Like Home"	4:32
3.	"When Crows Tick on Windows"	6:15
4.	"Two Flies Flew into a Black Sugar Cobweb"	7:49
5.	"Dreaming of a Nightmare in Eden"	2:37
6.	"Possessed by a Craft of Witchery"	6:10
7.	"Killed and Served by the Devil"	4:09
8.	"The Witch Perished in Flames"	5:46
9.	"Tragedy Ever After"	5:19
Total length:		44:13

Special edition bonus track
No.	Title	Length
10.	"Dreaming of a Nightmare in Eden (Orchestral version)" (Instrumental)	2:33
Total length:		46:46

== Personnel ==
Credits adapted from the album's liner notes.

Carach Angren

- Dennis "Seregor" Droomers - guitars and vocals
- Clemens "Ardek" Wijers - orchestra and keyboards; horror string orchestra, violin and violin effects on track 3
- Ivo "Namtar" Wijers - drums and percussion

Additional musicians

- Patrick Damiani - guitars and bass guitar; horror string orchestra on track 3
- Nikos Mavridis - violin on track 9; horror string orchestra, violin and violin effects on track 3

Team

- Correctura (Aida Grimrin) - lyrics edits
- Sylvy Notermans - lyrics proofread
- Patrick Damiani - recording and producing
- Peter Tägtgren - mixing
- Jonas Kjellgren - mastering
- Erik "Negakinu" Wijnands - artwork & design
- Pedro Ortiz IV - font and layout consulting
