= Romulus (album) =

2009 studio album by Ex Deo

Studio album by Ex Deo
- Released: June 19, 2009 (Europe); June 30, 2009 (North America)
- Genre: Symphonic death metal
- Length: 61:40
- Label: Nuclear Blast
- Producer: Jean-Francois Dagenais

Ex Deo chronology
Romulus (2009)	Caligvla (2012)

Professional ratings
Review scores
Source	Rating
Allmusic	4/5 stars

Romulus is the debut full-length album by Canadian death metal band Ex Deo. The album was released on June 19, 2009, through Nuclear Blast Records. The album was recorded with producer and Kataklysm guitarist Jean-Francois Dagenais.

The album title refers to Romulus, the traditional founder and, according to the legend, the first king of Rome.

== Recording and production ==
On December 5, 2008, the band announced they signed to Nuclear Blast Records for a record deal. This was the beginning of the creation of the forthcoming album. Shortly after, on December 31, 2008, the band announced they would air the first track of the upcoming album on January 11, 2009. The first track they aired was a demo version of Cry Havoc, followed by enthusiastic feedback from their fans on their MySpace page.

I chose to debut the new track on January 11th because it is the day my father was born (he passed away a few years ago). My father was a disciple of Roman history and taught me many things throughout the years. I remember a time he said "Son, everything you see around you, our ancestors built the foundation for it. From the way the wars were fought to the democracy you live in…" and I have been fascinated by it ever since. For his soul looking over me and for the future of this project, I launch a new seed for Roma on the 11th of 2009. I promise something that is much needed in the scene today. It's going to kick ass!

— Maurizio Iacono

Since February 20 the band started a weekly studio blog to keep their fans in the loop while they were working on the album. The blogs also included a special section called Do you know Rome?, which contained a weekly historical fact about the Roman Empire. In total there were about 5 fact posted on their MySpace page. By the time they posted their second studio update the band already recorded most of the music and even completed the song Storm the Gates of Alesia. During the time they posted their third studio update Iacono announced he completed the vocals for the album.

In March the band announced both the album's release dates and track list. They also announced the album was completely recorded.

On April 22 the band announced that Nergal, Karl Sanders and Obsidian C. would make guest appearances on the album.

It's an honor for me that such talented musicians and friends lended their art for a couple songs on this album. I only asked a few selected people that had involvement with history through their music and related to this band's concept, so I salute them for contributing to Rome's rise and they shall be amply rewarded for it.

— Maurizio Iacono

The band also posted another track called Legio XIII on their Myspace page. A song in honor of Rome's most devastating and lethal legion ever assembled; the 13th Legion which helped bring Caesar to power." And on June 15, 2009 the band announced they were streaming the entire album on their MySpace page, just before it was released on June 19, 2009.

== Track listing ==
- All songs written by Maurizio Iacono.

No.	Title	Length
1.	"Romulus"	5:17
2.	"Storm the Gates of Alesia" (featuring Adam "Nergal" Darski of Behemoth)	6:31
3.	"Cry Havoc"	7:01
4.	"In Her Dark Embrace"	4:48
5.	"Invictus"	6:47
6.	"The Final War (Battle of Actium)" (featuring Karl Sanders of Nile)	5:01
7.	"Legio XIII"	5:53
8.	"Blood, Courage and the Gods That Walk the Earth"	6:02
9.	"Cruor Nostri Abbas" (featuring Arnt "Obsidian C." Ove Grønbech of Keep of Kalessin)	5:29
10.	"Surrender the Sun"	4:55
11.	"The Pantheon (Jupiter's Reign)"	3:56
Total length:		61:40

=== Notes ===
1. A video for the title-track Romulus was shot. It was recorded in Belgrade, Serbia by director Stanimir "Staca" Lukic

== Personnel ==
Ex Deo

- Maurizio Iacono - vocals
- Stéphane Barbe - guitar
- Jean-François Dagenais - guitar, producer
- François Mongrain - bass guitar
- Jonathan Leduc - keyboards
- Max Duhamel - drums

Guest musicians

- Adam Darski – vocals on Storm the Gates of Alesia
- Karl Sanders – guitars on The Final War (Battle of Actium)
- Arnt Ove Grønbech – guitars on Cruor Nostri Abbas

== Music video ==
On January 30, 2010 the band announced they were going to shoot a video for the track Romulus in early March. The video was shot and directed by renowned director Stanimir "Staca" Lukic in Belgrade, Serbia.

I wanted the ideal person to bring this concept to life and we felt Staca's plan to do it was the right one. What better place to capture it then [sic] Europe itself?! Staca's work is nothing short of phenomenal and I can't wait to unleash the past fury of Rome on the world!

— Maurizio Iacono

In March Iacono announced the video for Romulus was shot and that he was very happy with the outcome.

The setup was extremely pro. Stanimir and Ivan did such an amazing job and paid attention to every single detail. To recreate Rome and the story of Romulus and Remus was a big challenge, but I think we nailed it and the ideas behind it are incredible. Expect an epic feel, like the movie '300' for the texture... A big thank you to all the film crew and the actors!

— Maurizio Iacono

Though the video for Romulus was already completed in March, it didn't air until May 12. But the band received tremendous feedback from their fans on their MySpace page shortly after.

Another music video was shot for the track "The Final War (Battle of Actium)".
