= Where the Corpses Sink Forever =

Studio album by Carach Angren
- Released: 18 May 2012
- Recorded: Tidalwave Studios at Karlsruhe, Germany
- Genre: Symphonic black metal
- Length: 43:09
- Label: Season of Mist
- Producer: Patrick Damiani, Carach Angren

Carach Angren chronology
Death Came Through a Phantom Ship (2010)	Where the Corpses Sink Forever (2012)	This Is No Fairytale (2015)

Professional ratings
Review scores
Source	Rating
Metal Underground	3.5/5 stars
Metal Temple	8/10 stars

Where the Corpses Sink Forever is the third studio album by Dutch symphonic black metal band Carach Angren. It was released on 18 May 2012 via Season of Mist. The concept of this album is not about a Dutch urban legend or ghost stories, like the previous two albums, but it deals with war. The album contains references to World Wars I and II, as well as the Vietnam War. The first track is a tape recording of a soldier who was ordered to shoot seven prisoners of war, and each shot can be heard. The soldier explains the strange and wicked sensations he felt as he shot each of the prisoners; they were grinning happily as he tried to kill them, and it seemed like the shots went through them, but they were actually demons who captured the soldier's soul in a time loop, making him suffer for eternity. Many of the songs in this album describe the deeds of each of the seven fiends; death, war, suffering.

== Track listing ==
- All music by Carach Angren.
- Main compositions by Ardek. All lyrics by Seregor, except where noted.
- All guitars written by Seregor and recorded by Patrick Damiani.

No.	Title	Writer(s)	Length
1.	"An Ominous Recording"	Ardek, Erik Wijnands	1:58
2.	"Lingering in an Imprint Haunting"		5:04
3.	"Bitte tötet mich" (Please Kill Me)		5:03
4.	"The Funerary Dirge of a Violinist"		8:04
5.	"Sir John"	Ardek	4:27
6.	"Spectral Infantry Battalions"		2:04
7.	"General Nightmare"	Ardek	4:19
8.	"Little Hector, What Have You Done?"		4:55
9.	"These Fields Are Lurking (Seven Pairs of Demon Eyes)"	Ardek, Erik Wijnands	7:15
Total length:			43:09

== Personnel ==
Credits adapted from the album's liner notes.

Carach Angren

- Dennis "Seregor" Droomers - guitars and vocals
- Clemens "Ardek" Wijers - orchestra and keyboards, backing vocals on tracks one, seven and eight
- Ivo "Namtar" Wijers - drums, percussion

Additional musicians

- Patrick Damiani - bass, guitars
- Nikos Mavridis - violin on tracks four and nine, backing vocals on track eight
- Philip Breuer - French spoken part on "General Nightmare"

Team

- Patrick Damiani - recording and mixing at Tidalwave Studio (www.tidalwave.de)
- Patrick Damiani and Carach Angren - producing
- 24-96 Mastering - mastering
- Erik Wijnands (www.negakinu.com) - artwork, all photography, textures & design
