= Lammendam =

Studio album by Carach Angren
- Released: 18 April 2008
- Recorded: 2007–2008
- Genre: Symphonic black metal
- Length: 41:26
- Label: Maddening Media
- Producer: Carach Angren

Carach Angren chronology
Ethereal Veiled Existence (2005)	Lammendam (2008)	Death Came Through a Phantom Ship (2010)

Lammendam is the debut studio album by Dutch symphonic black metal band Carach Angren. Released in 2008, it is a concept album about Lammendam, the remains of a castle that are haunted by a "ghost lady in a white dress". Dennis "Seregor" Droomers claims that he was inspired to write the album by a local legend that he has been familiar with since childhood. The legend centers around series of events that supposedly occurred in Schinveldse Bossen, a forest area northeast of the Dutch region of South Limburg and of the town of Schinveld, near the German border.

In several interviews, Seregor has described the legend as being about a young woman who lived in the castle in the 17th century. This woman was involved in a love triangle between two men; when both of the men found out about each other, several fights broke out. One night, under mysterious circumstances, her castle was burned, leading to the young woman's death, and her ghost remains on the land. Shortly after her death, her two lovers soon also died. According to the legend, her ghost appears in the forest on nights of the full moon wearing a long white dress.

The name Lammendam is a Dutch adaptation of the French term "La Dame Blanche", which translates to "The White Lady." This name was given to the ghost that appeared in Schinveldse Bossen by French farmers who had evacuated to the Netherlands during the French revolution.

== Style ==
The album features symphonic black metal with progressive song structures. The style has been compared to Anorexia Nervosa and Dimmu Borgir. A reviewer of Sputnikmusic observed that singer Seregor's vocals were unique since they are "relatively easy to understand and decipher upon first listen" when compared to other bands in the genre. The lyrics however are not written in the traditional verse-chorus-verse structure of the genre.

== Critical reception ==
Professional ratings
Review scores
Source	Rating
Metal Hammer (Germany)	4/7
Sonic Seducer	favourable
Sputnikmusic	3.5/5

Lammendam received positive reviews that nonetheless marked that the band was still at the beginning of their career. Metal Hammer Germany wrote that an own identity of the band was still needed. The Sonic Seducer magazine praised the technical skills of the band and the diversity of emotion portrayed by the album. Also Sputnikmusic was favorable of the band's instrumental skills.

== Track listing ==
- All music by Carach Angren
- Main compositions and arrangements by Ardek
- Lyrics written by Seregor

No.	Title	Length
1.	"Het spook van de Leiffartshof (The Ghost of the Leiffartshof)" (Instrumental)	1:28
2.	"A Strange Presence Near the Woods"	4:13
3.	"Haunting Echoes from the Seventeenth Century"	5:05
4.	"Phobic Shadows and Moonlit Meadows"	6:54
5.	"Hexed Melting Flesh"	2:06
6.	"The Carriage Wheel Murder"	3:40
7.	"Corpse in a Nebulous Creek"	5:24
8.	"Invisible Physic Entity" (Instrumental)	1:21
9.	"Heretic Poltergeist Phenomena"	4:08
10.	"La malédiction de la Dame Blanche (The Curse of the White Lady)"	7:07

2013 re-release bonus tracks
No.	Title	Length
11.	"There Was No Light" (Ethereal Veiled Existence EP song)	1:22
12.	"After Death Premises" (Ethereal Veiled Existence EP song)	4:15
13.	"Yonder Realm Photography" (Ethereal Veiled Existence EP song)	5:50

== Personnel ==
Credits adapted from the album's liner notes.

Carach Angren

- Dennis "Seregor" Droomers - guitars and vocals
- Clemens "Ardek" Wijers - orchestration, keyboards
- Ivo "Namtar" Wijers - drums and percussion

Additional musicians

- Patrick Damiani (Le Grand Guignol) - bass guitar and additional rhythm guitars
- Nikos Mavridis - violins on "A Strange Presence Near the Woods" and "Invisible Physic Entity"
- Yves Blaschette (Le Grand Guignol) - cello on "Invisible Physic Entity"
- Hye-Jung - female vocals on "Hexed Melting Flesh"
- Philip Breuer (Le Grand Guignol) - guest vocals on "La malédiction de la Dame Blanche"

Team

- Patrick Damiani - recording, mixing, mastering
- Erik "Negakinu" Wijnands - photography and design

== See also ==
- White Lady (ghost)
