= Blood Oath (Farnsworth novel) =

2010 novel by Christopher Farnsworth

- First edition
- Author: Christopher Farnsworth
- Cover artist: Will Staehle
- Language: English
- Series: Nathaniel Cade
- Genre: Horror, political thriller, spy
- Publisher: Putnam Adult
- Publication date: May 18, 2010
- Publication place: United States
- Media type: Print (hardcover)
- Pages: 390
- ISBN: 0-399-15635-6

Blood Oath is a 2010 horror thriller novel by Christopher Farnsworth, the first in his Nathaniel Cade series. It centers on three main characters: Nathaniel Cade, a vampire more than 160 years old, currently bound by a blood oath to serve and protect the President of the United States; former Federal Bureau of Investigation Agent William Griffin, or "Griff," Cade's handler for more than 30 years, and Zach Barrows, a former White House staffer that is Griff's replacement. The novel focuses on a deadly new threat to the United States from a horrible biological attack.

== Development ==
Farnsworth has stated that the idea behind this book came from the strange story of President Andrew Johnson's pardon of a man accused of being a vampire, as related by Robert Damon Schneck and Charles Fort. He reasoned that if this story was true, how powerful of an agent for the United States could that vampire become, and how much good would he be able to do?

== Plot summary ==
An Army Ranger unit is reassigned from hunting an Al-Qaeda terrorist cell in Iraq, to suddenly a clandestine mission in the unstable Republic of Kosovo, with details classified by the army's superiors. The unit conducts surveillance and maintains a security perimeter on a pack of Serbian thugs as night falls. A mysterious operative is then brought before the Serbian pack's leader and attempts to bargain with them for a metal box marked with US Army stencils that was stolen in rioting at the country's embassy. The operative attempts to trade a large bag of money for the case. However, the leader refuses to honour the agreement and, despite clear warnings by the operative, has his men attack the figure. One of the soldiers, veteran sniper Specialist Wayne Denton, witnesses the unusual operative suddenly react inhumanly fast and strong and proceeds to systematically kill them all, expertly and withstanding no injuries. Denton tries to kill the leader when he believes he will escape, only to find the leader is similarly fast and avoids his shot. Enraged, the leader races up to Denton's position to kill him. The operative, finished with the pack, intervenes at the last moment and kills the leader - witnessing the fight between them up close, Denton realizes what he is seeing: the Serbians were werewolves, and the operative, as he leaves, reveals he is a vampire. The unit is sworn to secrecy and returns to its mission the next day.

Twenty hours later, political operative Zachary Taylor "Zach" Barrows is escorted by Special Agent William Hawley "Griff" Griffin to the Smithsonian Institution directly from a meeting with Samuel Curtis, the President of the United States, at the White House. Zach, a savvy and capable rising star in the world of US politics, and previously the White House deputy director of political affairs, attempts to understand his situation. Griff rebuffs his attempts under the premise of "information containment" (Zach will know what he needs to know, when he needs to know it). Griff then silences Zach completely by revealing his own opinion that Zach is in his situation as, while drunk, Zach was caught by the Secret Service having sex with the president's daughter, Candace.

Upon arrival and entrance to the Smithsonian's oldest area, Griff brings Zach into the "Reliquary"; a hidden base containing relics (e.g. skeletal remains, robot pieces, crystal skulls, stone tablets, carved idols etc.) never before seen by the general public. As Griff explains, they are trophies kept by its occupant: Nathaniel Cade, the President's Vampire (and the mysterious operative from Kosovo). Griff reveals to Zach that vampires and creatures like them are very real, all part of the "Other Side" (a world of darkness and evil that surrounds the human world) and on a regular basis, they make attempts to infiltrate, overrun and wipe out the human race. Griff, a veteran former FBI agent, has acted as Cade's latest liaison for the office of the president. Nearing retirement, Zach has been chosen to succeed Griff, as President Curtis considers him loyal and a member of his inner circle who can be trusted to be "in the knowledge" about Cade. It is later revealed in a discussion with Zach out of the room that Griff is terminally ill with cancer.

Through flashbacks, Cade, as a young man, was serving on a whale hunting vessel in 1867. His ship was boarded by a monster vampire, which proceeded to pick off the crew until they reached land. Cade and two of his friends were ambushed while trying to locate the creature, and Cade was turned into a vampire himself. He then proceeded to kill and feed on his friends, and was then captured by a team of soldiers sent to the ship. Tried and sentenced to death, Cade was spared from being hanged when President Andrew Johnson pardoned him. Publicly he commuted his sentence to life imprisonment and official records on Cade say he died years later in an insane asylum.

In truth, Johnson, knowing exactly what Cade had become and the threats of the Other Side, decided to use him as a defence from incursions by monsters like him. To ensure his loyalty and obedience, Johnson brought voodoo queen Marie Laveau to bind Cade to the orders of him and his successors, and protect and serve the United States for as long as he existed.

Cade, suicidal over his transformation and the murders of his friends, asks Laveau to end his life. Laveau explains that, because of his actions and his new nature, Cade is damned - God will not receive him and Heaven has no place for him, despite his Christian faith, and he has no chance of redemption. Despite this, Laveau gives Cade some compassion, explaining further that he can do much good in the world with his new abilities, and save others from the Other Side. While Johnson wants Cade reduced to a mindless slave, Laveau is against this idea and instead uses a blood oath between Cade and an object provided by Johnson - the bullet that had killed President Abraham Lincoln. Appealing to his faith, Cade agrees to not turn his back on everything he was, and maintains he is a loyal patriot of the United States. Laveau performs the magic ritual and he is released to serve and fight for the president.

One ongoing issue he must address is his endless thirst for human blood; he satiates it by feeding only on animal blood, and deliberately wears a Christian cross provided by Laveau around his neck - despite it causing him severe pain (as it is a holy consecrated object), he uses it to focus on something else besides his thirst.

As Zach begins his first day, he and Cade are dispatched to the port of Baltimore. ICE agents have found a shipping container holding a grim discovery: various body parts all from deceased U.S. soldiers, all hanging on hooks in a meat locker. After interrogating the driver, Cade tells Zach that they are on their way to find Johann Konrad Dippel, the real-life inspiration for Dr. Frankenstein, as Cade suspects someone is trying to duplicate Konrad's research on bringing the dead back to life. During a meeting with President Curtis and the cabinet members who are in the knowledge, Cade advocates tracking down and interrogated Konrad. Despite the doubts raised by Lester Wyman, the Vice President of the United States who Curtis doesn't entirely trust, Curtis authorises Cade and Zach to investigate.

Konrad is an alchemist from Germany, currently over 350 years old, due to having discovered the Elixir of Life. His Elixir can bring dead tissue to life, and make it so strong just one of his creations killed dozens of people before being stopped. Konrad has previously been encountered by Cade developing bio-weapons for the Nazis and had been arrested in Nigeria by Cade and Griff in 1970; however, Konrad used his skills to save President Ronald Reagan's life after the attempt on his life in 1981; in return for this favour, and handing over his Elixir, he was granted a full pardon, U.S. citizenship and enough money to start a new life in America as a high-end plastic surgeon in Los Angeles.

An ongoing sidestory focuses on Dylan Weeks, a spoilt and deadbeat loser who is bitter with life, who is approached by Khaled al-Attar, who previously knew Dylan as a rich student at the same college as him, but has since become radicalised and became a terrorist - Khaled recruits Dylan to work for him at his father's shipping company in Kuwait, where he then involves him in his group that is planning, with Konrad, in unleashing a supernatural terrorist attack on the White House. At Khaled's direction, Dylan acts as a U.S. Army contractor and proceeds to steal body parts from dead soldiers, provide them to Khaled's group, who then ship it to the U.S. to Konrad, who then uses his Elixir and centuries of medical skill to rebuild them as "Unmenschsoldat"; zombie soldiers capable of vast destruction.

Konrad is knowingly breaking his word to the U.S. government, as he seeks to destroy America in revenge for the destruction of Third Reich in World War II. He is aided in his efforts by Helen Holt, a CIA operative who also works for the "Shadow Company", a dark organization operating inside the U.S. government and was involved in President John F. Kennedy's assassination and Roswell. Holt goes against Company orders in aiding Konrad as she has been promised immortality by him with his Elixir, and she also uses Wyman, who is in league with the Company in exchange for their help becoming president, to keep tabs on the investigation.

Unable to proceed against Konrad with evidence on Curtis' order, Cade leaves Zach to tail Konrad while he finds an Alcoholics Anonymous meeting to attend. At the A.A. meetings, Cade is able to draw strength from the humans, as they all struggle with desire for the drink, even if they have different thirsts. As Cade leaves, he is stopped by Tania, a female vampire he failed to help in the past. While neither will admit it, their shared history gives them both the closest thing to feelings for each other that vampires can feel.

Ultimately Cade and Zach unravel the plot - Konrad has the four finished Unmenschsoldat delivered near the White House, where Khaled and his conspirators sacrifice their lives to bring them to life and carry out their programmed attack; Dylan, already having misgivings about his involvement, flees for his life. While Cade locates and is prepared to kill Konrad, he learns the attack on the White House has begun, and his oath compels him to leave Konrad alive and return to Washington immediately.

Despite Griff (who was discredited by evidence planted by Holt to make it look like he was a mole in exchange for enough of Konrad's Elixir to cure his cancer) raising the alarm, the attack kills dozens of Secret Service personnel and Curtis, Wyman and Griff are stranded in the Oval Office. Despite impressive fighting skills and inhuman tolerance, Cade very nearly dies while destroying three of the zombies - Zach saves his life and earns some measure of his respect. Nearing sunrise, when Cade cannot operate, Cade speeds back to the Reliquary and retrieves the object from Kosovo; inside the box is the preserved Hand of John the Baptist, which contains holy power over life and death.

While Zach slows down the final zombie and ensures the safety of Candace and Curtis' family, the final zombie comes within inches of killing the president, and fatally wounds Griff when he throws himself in front a strike aimed at a defenceless Cade. However, the zombie's original human consciousness, a deceased U.S. marine corporal, becomes aware enough of what's happening and recognises the president, and is able to stop himself from killing him. Cade then uses the Hand to remove the zombie's life force and kill it.

In the epilogue, Curtis tells Wyman they will keep looking for the real traitor, and strongly implies he suspects Wyman himself. Holt is revealed to have survived and now wants revenge on the Company, Konrad and Cade for leaving her near-dead, Konrad is revealed to have fled to Pakistan and is now working in squalid working conditions. A few weeks later, Cade confronts Dylan in his family's condo in Acapulco - declaring he is guilty of treason, Cade kills him.

== Themes ==
Self-control/sacrifice: Cade is unique in vampires in that he refuses, in spite of agonizing pain and wild desire, to drink human blood. This stems from his traumatic conversion from human to vampire. He subsists on animal blood, and in a unique twist, he helps fight his thirst for blood by attending Alcoholics Anonymous meetings, drawing strength from alcoholics who fight their thirst every day of their lives.

Religion: Cade's constant self-damnation contrasts with his fanatical fight to serve and protect, rather than feed on, humans. This constant struggle has been described by Farnsworth as stemming from Cade being raised Calvinist, with a strong belief in predestination and the damnation of most of humanity., He also objects when those around him blaspheme by using the Lord's name in vain, and wears a worn cross around his neck, despite its physical discomfort.

Fear of unknown: Besides the obvious "cool" factor to vampires, Farnsworth describes much of the story reflecting society's current fears. He states that "Whenever we have trouble facing our fears head-on, we call out the monsters. In the 50s, it was the alien invasion movie. In the 80s, it was the relentless, unstoppable serial killer. And now, we're dealing with the war on terror with vampires and zombies."

== Literary reviews ==
In The Washington Post, Elizabeth Hand praised Blood Oath as an "irresistible page-turner", and noted that it used the same themes as The Manchurian Candidate and Invasion of the Body Snatchers. The New York Times has Blood Oath topping their summer reading list. The New York Post described it as a "rollicking Washington thriller", and "required reading". The Wall Street Journal called it "silly but better than Twilight."

== References and inspirations ==
Farnsworth admits to being a fan of many other vampire novels, though he claims to stay away from them while writing. He has described Zach as the type of person that he might have become had he stayed the political path instead of reporting.

== Film adaptation ==
According to Fangoria.com, Blood Oath has been optioned by producer Lucas Foster, the man behind Man on Fire, Mr. and Mrs. Smith, Equilibrium and Law Abiding Citizen, among many others. Farnsworth, who will have an executive producer credit for the film, has not had much to say about the production other than his great desire to have Christian Bale in the title role of Cade and Justin Long filling in for Zach.

"For Cade, I would love to see Christian Bale. He's a chameleonic actor who can portray the best and worst in people. For Zach, I always saw Justin Long (The "Mac" in the "Mac and PC" commercials from Apple.)"

== Future works ==
Farnsworth has recently released book three, titled Red, White and Blood, and states that he would like to continue Cade's adventures for quite some time. "I've got ideas and outlines for 10 books in the series. I'm not sure how much further I'll go after that, but as long as people keep buying them, we'll get at least to number 10."

== Tour ==
Farnsworth went on a cross country book reading and signing tour. He visited various cities in California, Colorado, Arizona, Idaho, Oregon and Texas, and finished in Bakersfield, California at the end of June, with a Halloween Night event in Irvine, CA.
