= Death Came Through a Phantom Ship =

Studio album by Carach Angren
- Released: 26 February 2010
- Recorded: Tidalwave Studios
- Genre: Symphonic black metal
- Length: 43:47
- Label: Maddening Media
- Producer: Patrick Damiani, Carach Angren

Carach Angren chronology
Lammendam (2008)	Death Came Through a Phantom Ship (2010)	Where the Corpses Sink Forever (2012)

Death Came Through a Phantom Ship is the second studio album by Dutch symphonic black metal band Carach Angren, It was released in 2010.

This album tells the legend of a ghost ship (an interpretation of the Flying Dutchman) from its beginnings. While a wide variety of interpretations of the Flying Dutchman legend exist, the band says that the album is based on the Dutch interpretation of the story. However, they took some creative liberties with it to make it a more horrifying story.

The album starts in the future, when a boat with an electronic communication device sails to the sea. The boat picks up signs of an eerie voice cursing its captain's name through the radio. Then a ghost ship comes across the sea. The sailors then remember stories about how people who saw that ship died in horrible ways. In track No. 3, in the same day of the sighting, later that night, the captain is haunted by the ghost of the seas. He kills his wife and daughter while sleepwalking and then kills himself with a shotgun. After that, it begins telling the story of Van der Decken and how he became the captain of an evil ship.

== Style ==
The album contains symphonic black metal although the vocals are kept clear. Parallels to Dimmu Borgir have been observed in the keyboard lines and the vocals' timbre. The structure of the songs has been described as "bulky" with many abrupt breaks, which is contrary to traditional black metal structures.

== Reception ==
Professional ratings
Review scores
Source	Rating
Metal Hammer (Germany)	5/7
Sputnikmusic	4/5

Death Came Through a Phantom Ship received positive reviews from Sputnikmusic and the German edition of Metal Hammer. The former observed that the band had even improved their instrumental qualities compared to their debut album Lammendam and recommended the new album for listeners new to the genre. Metal Hammer praised the diversity of the songs but was sceptical of their unusual structure.

== Track listing ==
- All music by Seregor, Ardek & Namtar
- Main compositions by Ardek
- Lyrics by Seregor and Erik Wijnands (Negakinu Photography)

No.	Title	Length
1.	"Electronic Voice Phenomena"	0:59
2.	"The Sighting Is a Portent of Doom"	4:09
3.	"...and the Consequence Macabre"	6:45
4.	"Van der Decken's Triumph"	5:17
5.	"Bloodstains on the Captain's Log"	5:52
6.	"Al betekent het mijn dood" (Even If It Means My Death)	1:08
7.	"Departure Towards a Nautical Curse"	5:33
8.	"The Course of a Spectral Ship"	5:09
9.	"The Shining Was a Portent of Gloom"	8:49

2013 re-release bonus tracks
No.	Title	Length
10.	"The Ghost of Raynham Hall" (Ethereal Veiled Existence EP 2011 re-recorded song)	4:55
11.	"Ethereal Veiled Existence" (Ethereal Veiled Existence EP 2011 re-recorded song)	5:20
12.	"Sepulchral Disequilibrium" (The Chase Vault Tragedy EP 2011 re-recorded song)	3:58

== Personnel ==
Credits adapted from the album's liner notes.

Carach Angren

- Dennis "Seregor" Droomers - guitars and vocals, choir on track 6
- Clemens "Ardek" Wijers - orchestration and keyboards, backing vocals on track 1 & 6, choir on track 6
- Ivo "Namtar" Wijers - drums and percussion

Additional musicians

- Patrick Damiani (Rome, Le Grand Guignol) - bass-guitar & additional guitars, choir on track 6
- Nikos Mavridis (Rome) - violins on tracks 3, 4, 5 and 9

Team

- Patrick Damiani - recording and mixing at Tidalwave Studios (www.tidalwave.de)
- Patrick Damiani and Carach Angren - producing
- 24-96 Mastering - mastering
- Carach Angren and Erik Wijnands - artwork
- Erik Wijnands (www.myspace.com/negakinu) - all photography, textures & design
