= Franckensteina Strataemontanus =

Studio album by Carach Angren
- Released: 26 June 2020
- Genre: Symphonic black metal
- Length: 48:02 (original version); 50:41 (deluxe version)
- Label: Season of Mist
- Producer: Carach Angren

Carach Angren chronology
Dance and Laugh Amongst the Rotten (2017)	Franckensteina Strataemontanus (2020)	The Cult of Kariba (2025)

Singles from Franckensteina Strataemontanus
- 1. "Monster" Released: 11 March 2020; 2. "Der Vampir von Nürnberg" Released: 24 April 2020; 3. "Operation Compass" Released: 26 May 2020; 4. "Franckensteina Strataemontanus" Released: 10 November 2020

Professional ratings
Review scores
Source	Rating
Blabbermouth.net	8/10 link
Distorted Sound	7/10 link
Decibel	Favorable link
Angry Metal Guy	3/5 link
Tuonela Magazine	Mixed link

Franckensteina Strataemontanus is the sixth studio album by Dutch symphonic black metal band Carach Angren. Released on 26 June 2020 through Season of Mist, it is a concept album inspired by the life of late 17th-century/early 18th-century German occultist Johann Konrad Dippel, whose controversial experiments with corpses allegedly inspired Mary Shelley's influential 1818 Gothic novel Frankenstein; or, The Modern Prometheus; its title is a reference to a Latin epithet adopted by Dippel later in life. It is also their final release with long-time drummer and founding member Ivo "Namtar" Wijers, who left the band as soon as the recording sessions ended citing "dissatisfactions with the music industry".

== Background ==
Carach Angren announced through their social media in late 2019 that they began work on a new studio album, scheduled to come out through Season of Mist in mid-2020. On 20 February 2020 the album's title, cover art and tracklist were unveiled, and the song "Monster" was released in advance on 11 March followed by "Der Vampir von Nürnberg" on 24 April and "Operation Compass" on 26 May. A deluxe version containing a bonus track was also announced.

A music video for the title track "Franckensteina Strataemontanus" was released on 10 November 2020.

Originally slated to come out on 29 May 2020, the release date was later pushed to 26 June as a consequence of the COVID-19 pandemic.

== Reception ==
The album has received generally positive reviews upon its release. Dom Lawson of Blabbermouth.net rated it with an 8 out of 10, stating that "Franckensteina Strataemontanus feels like a very clear and belligerent demonstration of how sophisticated [Carach Angren's] identity has become", and that even though "black metal purists will probably flinch from this band's overt stylishness and taste for the vivid colors of widescreen horror" and "its sole downside is the fact that we can't currently watch this stuff unfolding on a stage", "that never stopped lots of other bands from being hugely successful. Carach Angren are playing to the ghoulish gallery, but it'll be standing room only soon enough". Elliot Leaver of Distorted Sound rated it with a 7 out of 10, writing that "[T]his is a very fun record, and one that serves as a very fitting swansong for Carach Angren's departing drummer. As the band continue on as a duo, they will look to build on their growing success and Franckensteina Strataemontanus is the album to do just that. It's not going to finish close to the top of End of Year lists, but it's certainly worth a number of spins". Chris Dick of Decibel wrote of the album very positively, comparing it to a piece by Benjamin Wallfisch.

Dr. A. N. Grier of Angry Metal Guy gave a slightly more mixed review, rating it with a 3 out of 5 and stating that "[W]hile Franckensteina Strataemontanus captivates me with its story, it doesn't fully captivate me musically. 'Monster' and 'Franckensteina Strataemontanus' are my favorites because they're concise, display control, and contribute in a big way to the classic Frankenstein story. 'The Necromancer' is a massive contributor as well. Especially the infamous line, 'It's alive!'. But it's not a standout track. And 'Operation Compass' has nothing to do with the story. Which confuses me greatly. That said, if you're looking for more horror in these uncertain times, Franckensteina Strataemontanus is for you". Another mixed review came from Didrik Mešiček of Tuonela Magazine, who wrote: "[A]dmittedly, this was a hard review to write. I struggle to say anything bad about the actual music, but I just don't feel this album. It's not the Carach Angren I fell in love with, but there's a case to be made about Ardek's orchestrations being better than ever. Somehow it all still feels uninspired though and overall it's definitely my least favorite album from the Dutch trio so far"; he also noticed the band seems to be departing from black metal ever since their 2017 album Dance and Laugh Amongst the Rotten.

== Track listing ==
Franckensteina Strataemontanus track listing
No.	Title	Length
1.	"Here in German Woodland"	1:35
2.	"Scourged Ghoul Undead"	5:38
3.	"Franckensteina Strataemontanus"	3:03
4.	"The Necromancer"	4:08
5.	"Sewn for Solitude"	3:52
6.	"Operation Compass"	6:00
7.	"Monster"	3:33
8.	"Der Vampir von Nürnberg" (The Vampire of Nuremberg)	6:00
9.	"Skull with a Forked Tongue"	5:56
10.	"Like a Conscious Parasite I Roam"	8:16

Deluxe edition bonus track
No.	Title	Length
11.	"Frederick's Experiments"	2:40

== Personnel ==
Carach Angren

- Dennis "Seregor" Droomers – guitars, lead vocals
- Clemens "Ardek" Wijers – keyboards, guitars, bass, backing vocals
- Ivo "Namtar" Wijers – drums

Additional musicians

- Nikos Mavridis – violin (tracks 5 and 10)

Team

- Stefan Heilemann/Heilemania – cover artwork
- Patrick Damiani (Tidal Wave Studio) – engineering (drums, guitars, bass)
- Robert Carranza – mixing, mastering

== Charts ==
Chart performance for Franckensteina Strataemontanus
Chart (2020)	Peak position
Finnish Albums (Suomen virallinen lista)	1
German Albums (Offizielle Top 100)	80
