= Caligvla =

2012 studio album by Ex Deo

Studio album by Ex Deo
- Released: 31 August 2012
- Genre: Symphonic death metal
- Length: 49:29
- Label: Napalm Records
- Producers: Maurizio Iacono, Jean-François Dagenais

Ex Deo chronology
| Romulus (2009) | Caligvla (2012) | The Immortal Wars (2017) |

Caligvla is the second album released by Canadian death metal band Ex Deo, on 31 August 2012. The album title refers to Caligula, the third emperor of Rome known for his cruelty, sadism, extravagance, and intense personal insanity.

== Release ==
Ex Deo first announced its second album on 19 August 2010 through their Facebook page. They mentioned the writing process would begin in late 2011. On 14 October 2010 the band revealed the new album's title Caligula, which would later be changed to Caligvla. On 16 April 2011 the band announced would take longer than initially expected.

On 28 September 2011, an announcement was made that the album would be released on 31 August 2012, which would also mark Caligula's 2000th anniversary. In November 2011, the band began to record for the album. On 4 February 2012 Maurizio posted a studio update that most of the symphonies and orchestral parts were done. He also mentioned that the process of creating the album would take a lot of time and would possibly interfere with their Paganfest tour. The band cancelled their appearance at "Paganfest America Part III" a few days later.

Iacono commented on the cancellation:

"We were all excited to play this festival and premier some new material, but unfortunately our new album, 'Caligvla', has been delayed, and we need to finish it and make it perfect. Add to that, the Kataklysm DVD is also on its final production phase... We decided it would be best to concentrate on giving every bit of attention to the album you have been waiting for, and also for the Kataklysm documentary to kick major ass. This being said, we will still perform with Ex Deo on the Montreal and Toronto shows with Paganfest, as we will be in studio in the area, closing up the album 'Caligvla'. Everything else is cancelled for Ex Deo. We will return to support the album in the fall... Word from Rome is that the plans are already in motion for world conquest! We ask our fans to support Paganfest and the great bands playing this year!"

On 16 February 2012 Maurizio started recording his vocals which would be finished by 21 February. In March 2012 the band revealed the final track listing of Caligvla and also announced they began mixing the album. On 23 March 2012, the band revealed the guest appearances on Caligvla, which would involve Seth Siro (Septic Flesh), Mariangela Demurtas (Tristania), Stefano Fiori (Graveworm) and Francesco Artusato (All Shall Perish). The band unveiled the album cover artwork for Caligvla on 15 April 2012.

In June 2012, the band announced a video for the song I, Caligvla, featuring Maurizio's girlfriend and Colombian model Suzzy. On 27 July 2012 they uploaded the new video for I, Caligvla on YouTube.

== Reception ==
MetalStorm rated it 7.9/10.

MetalSucks gave it 3.5/5.0 horns.

The Encyclopaedia Metallum currently has an average rating of 83% approval.

Metal Underground gave it five skulls, indicating that it was "Perfection. (No discernable flaws; one of the reviewer's all-time favorites)"

Angry Metal Guy gave the album a 'very good' rating of 3.5/5.0 with the epithet "Move over, vest metal, make room for Chest Plate Metal!"

== Track listing ==
| No. | Title | Length |
|---|---|---|
| 1. | "I, Caligvla" | 4:49 |
| 2. | "The Tiberius Cliff (Exile to Capri)" | 5:38 |
| 3. | "Per Oculos Aquila" | 4:20 |
| 4. | "Divide et Impera" | 5:01 |
| 5. | "Pollice Verso (Damnatio ad Bestia)" | 5:15 |
| 6. | "Burned to Serve as Nocturnal Light (Bonus Track)" | 4:35 |
| 7. | "Teutoburg (Ambush of Varus)" | 5:16 |
| 8. | "Along the Appian Way" | 5:38 |
| 9. | "Once Were Romans" | 5:19 |
| 10. | "Evocatio: The Temple of Castor & Pollux" | 3:38 |

=== Notes ===
1. A video for the title-track I, Caligvla was shot.

== Personnel ==
Ex Deo

- Maurizio Iacono – vocals, composer, executive Producer, lyricist, producer
- Stéphane Barbe – lead guitar
- Jean-Francois Dagenais – rhythm guitar, engineer, producer
- Dano Apekian – bass guitar
- Jonathan Lefrancois-Leduc – keyboards, orchestration
- Max Duhamel – drums

Additional musicians

- Seth Siro Anton – vocals, cover art, cover layout
- Stegano Fiori – vocals
- Mariangela Demurtas – vocals
- Francesco Artusato – guitar, soloist

Technical personnel

- Jason Messer – band photo

== Trivia ==
The intro to 'Once Were Romans' is taken from the historical drama TV series Rome.
