= Dennis Droomers =

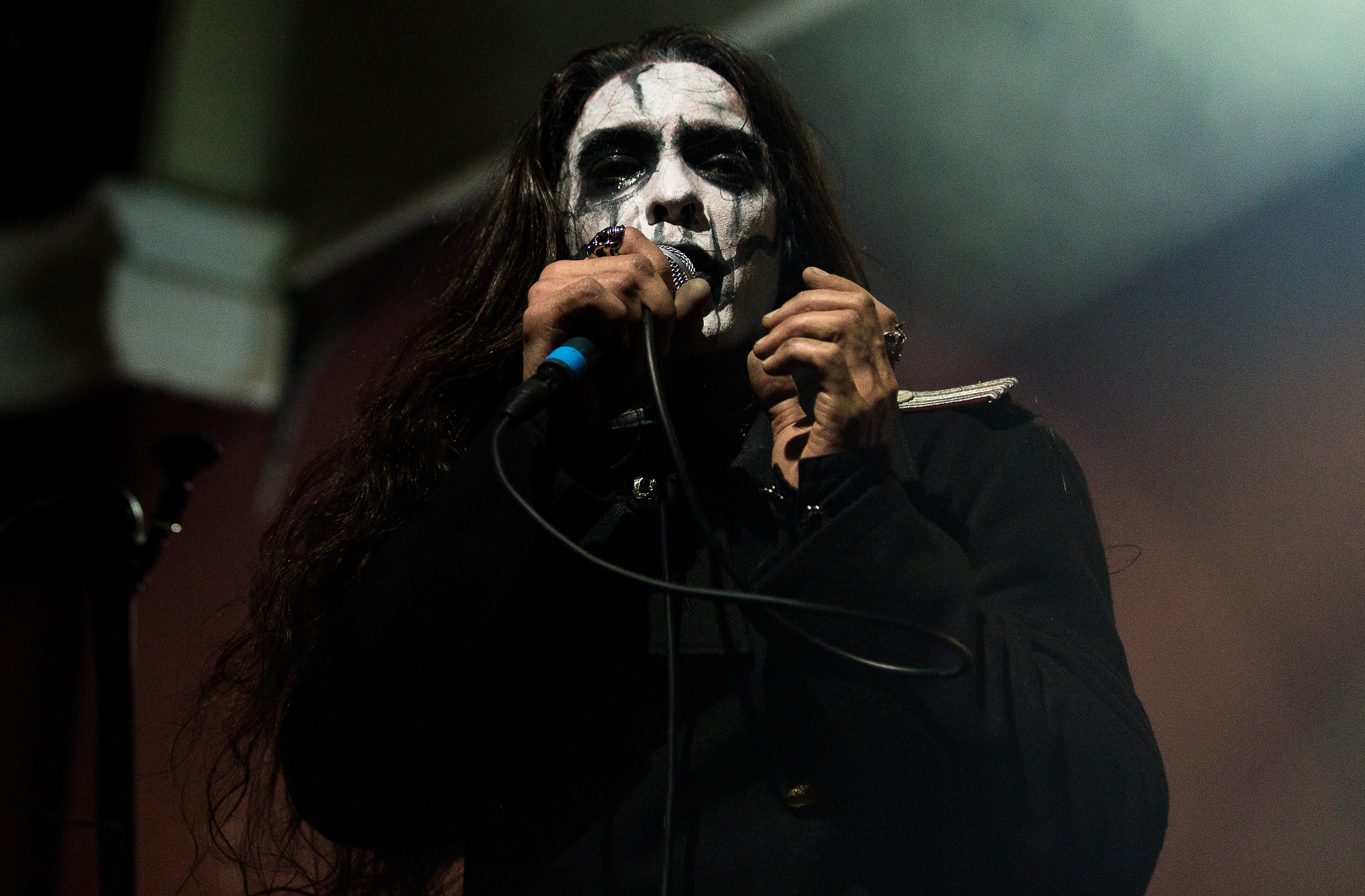
- Seregor performing with Carach Angren at Wave-Gotik-Treffen 2016 in Leipzig, Germany.

Background information
- Also known as: Seregor
- Born: 27 October 1980 (age 45); Heerlen, Limburg, Netherlands
- Genres: Symphonic black metal, Black metal
- Occupations: Singer, guitarist, lyricist
- Instruments: Vocals, guitars
- Years active: 1996–present
- Labels: Season of Mist, Maddening Media

Dennis "Seregor" Droomers (born 27 October 1980) is a Dutch vocalist, guitarist, artist, and songwriter. He is best known as the lead vocalist and guitarist for Dutch symphonic black metal band, Carach Angren. The stage name "Seregor" comes from Tolkien's Silmarillion. It is a combination of the word sereg which means blood, and gor which means abhorrent. Before Carach Angren, Droomers played bass and was the vocalist for Inger Indolia from 1996 to 2001 and was the vocalist for Vaultage from 2003 to 2005 with fellow Carach Angren member Clemens "Ardek" Wijers on keyboards. Carach Angren began as his and Wijers' side project while they were playing in Vaultage, because the two connected over a shared love of horror and storytelling. Later, Vaultage was disbanded as Carach Angren became increasingly successful. It is known that he grew up close to Schildveldse Bossen near where the focus of Lammendam took place. It is also known that he was primarily raised by his grandparents and is close to his grandmother who appears on the album art of This Is No Fairytale as the hand of the witch. Typically, Droomers writes Carach Angren's lyrics and stories while bandmate Clemens "Ardek" Wijers writes the composition.

Droomers also builds and sells masks, including customized commissions. He is self-taught and has never had any formal artistic education, nor has he had formal musical training. When asked about his artistic background he responded, "just like guitar playing, extreme vocals, songwriting etc. I sorted it all out myself." His masks are frequently sold to fans through his website and Facebook page and Italian band Fleshgod Apocalypse has also used costume pieces made by Droomers. He also made all the gravestones in the "Charles Francis Coghlan" music video himself out of plaster and cardboard.

== Influences ==
Droomers claims that the paranormal has always been fascinating to him. He is also a big horror movie fan, and has cited Hellraiser and The Fly as favorites. To him, music is a release for creative story ideas and he has discussed that typically the concept comes first and the music and performance works around it. Therefore, all Carach Angren music has a horror concept with a particular focus on ghosts and spirits.

== Discography ==
=== Carach Angren ===
- The Chase Vault Tragedy (2004)
- Ethereal Veiled Existence (2005)
- Lammendam (2008)
- Death Came Through a Phantom Ship (2010)
- Where the Corpses Sink Forever (2012)
- This Is No Fairytale (2015)
- Dance and Laugh Amongst the Rotten (2017)
- Franckensteina Strataemontanus (2020)

=== Inger Indolia ===
- Hexed Forgotten Sanctuaries (2000)
- Sycosynthesis (2001)

=== Vaultage ===
- Hallucinate Beyond (2003)

== See also ==
- Carach Angren
- Clemens "Ardek" Wijers
