= Dance and Laugh Amongst the Rotten =

Studio album by Carach Angren
- Released: 16 June 2017
- Recorded: December 2016–January 2017
- Studio: The Abyss
- Genre: Symphonic black metal
- Length: 41:17
- Label: Season of Mist
- Producer: Carach Angren

Carach Angren chronology
This Is No Fairytale (2015)	Dance and Laugh Amongst the Rotten (2017)	Franckensteina Strataemontanus (2020)

Dance and Laugh Amongst the Rotten is the fifth studio album by Dutch symphonic black metal band Carach Angren. It was released on 16 June 2017 via Season of Mist. Although the album doesn't follow a linear story as their previous albums did, it is still a concept album. Clemens "Ardek" Wijers describes the album's concept as visitations from multiple ghosts of the dead; including the "Blood Queen" and Charles Francis Coghlan. The full album is focused on a nameless girl who plays with a Ouija board causing her to raise a variety of spirits and ends up getting possessed. The album ends by informing the listener that the box the CD came in is haunted by these same spirits, and that by opening the album, the listener has also released them.

== Track listing ==
- Composed by Ardek.
- Guitars written by Ardek (tracks 5 to 9) and Seregor (tracks 2 to 9).
- Lyrics by Ardek (tracks 3, 5, 7 & 9) and Seregor (tracks 2, 4, 6 & 8)
- Violin written by Ardek (tracks 3 to 9)

No.	Title	Length
1.	"Opening"	2:17
2.	"Charlie"	4:10
3.	"Blood Queen"	4:55
4.	"Charles Francis Coghlan"	6:07
5.	"Song for the Dead"	4:16
6.	"In de Naam Van de Duivel"	6:29
7.	"Pitch Black Box"	3:17
8.	"The Possession Process"	4:27
9.	"Three Times Thunder Strikes"	5:19
Total length:		41:17

Special edition bonus track
No.	Title	Length
10.	"Charles Francis Coghlan (Orchestral version)" (Instrumental)	6:06
Total length:		47:23

== Personnel ==
Credits adapted from the album's liner notes.

Carach Angren

- Dennis "Seregor" Droomers – guitar, sound effects, vocals, backing vocals on "Opening"
- Clemens "Ardek" Wijers – guitar, bass, keyboards, orchestral arrangements, orchestration, violin, backing vocals on "Opening"
- Ivo "Namtar" Wijers – drums, sound effects

Additional musicians

- Patrick Damiani – guitar, bass, guitar engineer
- Nikos Mavridis – violin (tracks 3 to 9)

Team

- Costin Chioreanu – artwork, design
- Jonas Kjellgren – mastering
- Peter Tägtgren – mixing, drum engineering
- Sylvy Notermans – proof reading
- Erik Wijnands – lyric consultant

== Charts ==
Chart (2017)	Peak position
Belgian Albums (Ultratop Wallonia)	190
