= Ethereal Veiled Existence =

Extended play by Carach Angren

EP by Carach Angren
- Released: 2005
- Recorded: during August/September 2005
- Studio: Wijers residence in Well (Netherlands)
- Genre: Symphonic black metal
- Length: 21:46
- Label: Independent
- Producer: Carach Angren

Carach Angren chronology
The Chase Vault Tragedy (2004)	Ethereal Veiled Existence (2005)	Lammendam (2008)

Ethereal Veiled Existence is the first EP by Dutch symphonic black metal band Carach Angren. All tracks are based on a haunting called Brown Lady of Raynham Hall, known from the worlds' most famous ghost-picture, taken in 1936. Recorded & produced at the Wijers residence in Well (Netherlands) during August/September 2005. It was limited to 300 copies.

== Track listing ==
No.	Title	Length
1.	"There Was No Light"	1:22
2.	"The Ghost of Raynham Hall"	4:54
3.	"After Death Premises"	4:15
4.	"Ethereal Veiled Existence"	5:25
5.	"Yonder Realm Photography"	5:50
Total length:		21:46

== Personnel ==
Credits adapted from the album's liner notes.

Carach Angren

- Dennis "Seregor" Droomers - vocals, bass, guitars, lyrics, cover artwork
- Clemens "Ardek" Wijers - synthesizer, piano, mixing, mastering
- Ivo "Namtar" Wijers - drums

Other

- Erik "Negakinu" Wijnands - photography
