= Ex Deo =

Canadian death metal band

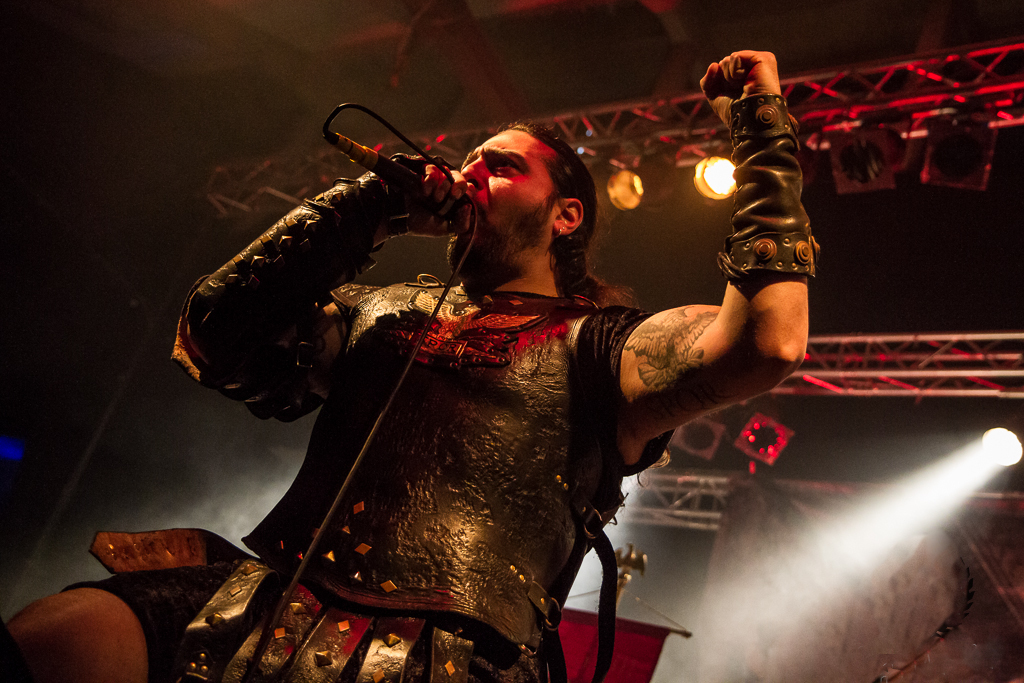
- Maurizio Iacono

Background information
- Origin: Montreal, Quebec, Canada
- Genre: Symphonic death metal
- Years active: 2008–2014, 2015–present
- Labels: Nuclear Blast, Napalm, Reigning Phoenix
- Members: Maurizio Iacono; Stéphane Barbe; Jean-François Dagenais; Dano Apekian; James Payne
- Past members: Max Duhamel; François Mongrain; Jonathan Lefrancois-Leduc; Oli Beaudoin; Jeramie Kling
- Website: https://www.exdeoband.com/

Ex Deo is a Canadian death metal band formed in Montreal, Quebec in 2008. The band is a side project of Kataklysm frontman Maurizio Iacono, and is based on the history of the Roman Empire.

== History ==
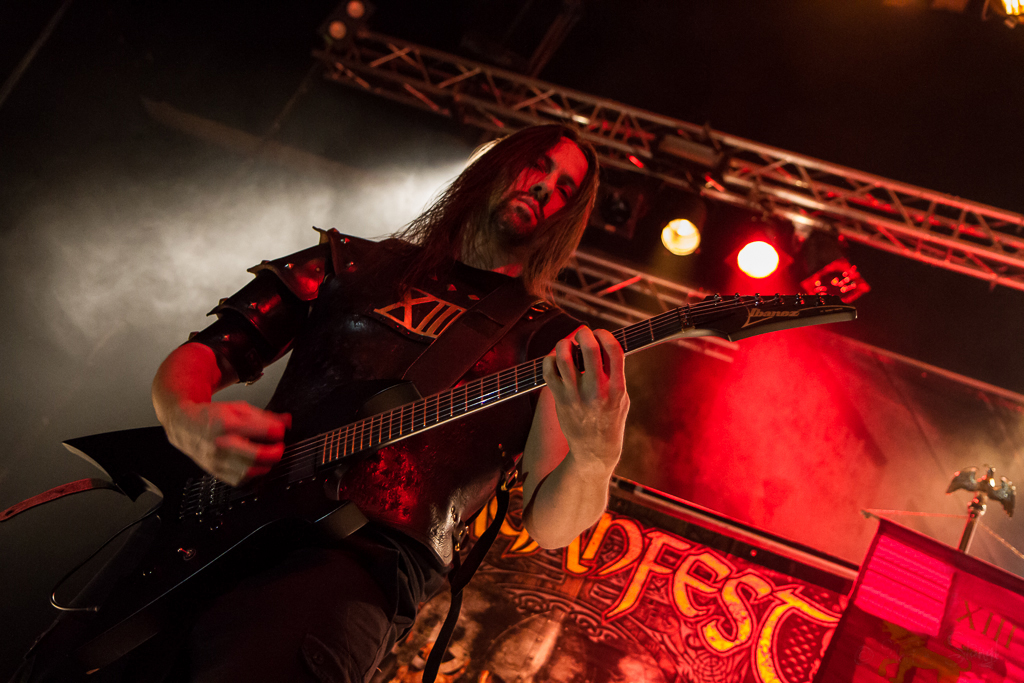
Stéphane Barbe

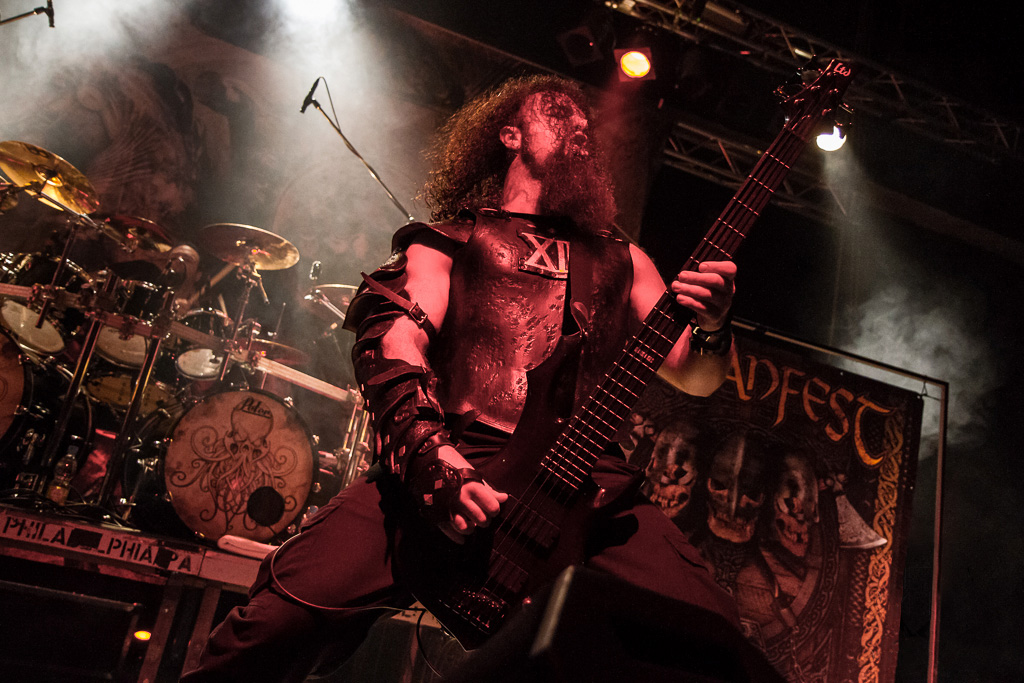
Dano Apekian

Ex Deo was formed in 2008 as a project of Maurizio Iacono, who is of Italian heritage. It became the first Roman Legion melodic death metal band. In performance, band members wear modified Roman Legion uniforms.

=== Romulus (2009) ===
Ex Deo's debut album, Romulus, was released in Europe and North America in June 2009, on Nuclear Blast. The album was recorded with producer and Kataklysm guitarist Jean-François Dagenais, featuring guest appearances by Karl Sanders (Nile), Obsidian C. (Keep of Kalessin) and Nergal (Behemoth). It was generally well received. The band toured to support it, playing Hellfest in France, FortaRock Festival in Holland, Paganfest in Germany and a group concert in New York.

On December 14, 2010, the band parted with Nuclear Blast and signed with Napalm Records.

=== Caligvla (2012–2014) ===
Ex Deo's second album, Caligvla, was released on August 31, 2012, Caligula's 2000th anniversary. The album features guest appearances by Seth Siro (Spiros Antoniou) (Septicflesh), Mariangela Demurtas (Tristania), Stefano Fiori (Graveworm) and Francesco Artusato (All Shall Perish) and was well received by critics.

In June 2012, the band released the video for the song "I, Caligvla" (featuring Iacono's girlfriend, Colombian model Suzzy), and toured with Septicflesh, which Iacono was then managing. In addition to numerous North American dates, they played Bloodstock Open Air 2013, and were the special guests at the Cardiff show of the "At the Gate of Sethu 2013 European Tour Part II" in September 2013.

Caligvla was nominated for Metal/Hard Music Album of the Year at the Juno Awards of 2013.

=== The Immortal Wars (2015–2018) ===
In February 2017, Ex Deo released their third album, The Immortal Wars, about the Punic Wars. It was well received. In 2018, the band went on a European tour with Ensiferum, playing dates in France, the Netherlands and Denmark, including Royal Metal Fest.

=== The Thirteen Years of Nero and Year of the Four Emperors EP (2021–) ===
On June 14, 2021, Ex Deo announced its fourth album, The Thirteen Years of Nero, about Roman Emperor Nero, released on August 27, 2021. The band received positive reviews.

On December 18, 2024, Ex Deo announced they would release the EP Year of the Four Emperors on January 10, 2025.

== Band members ==
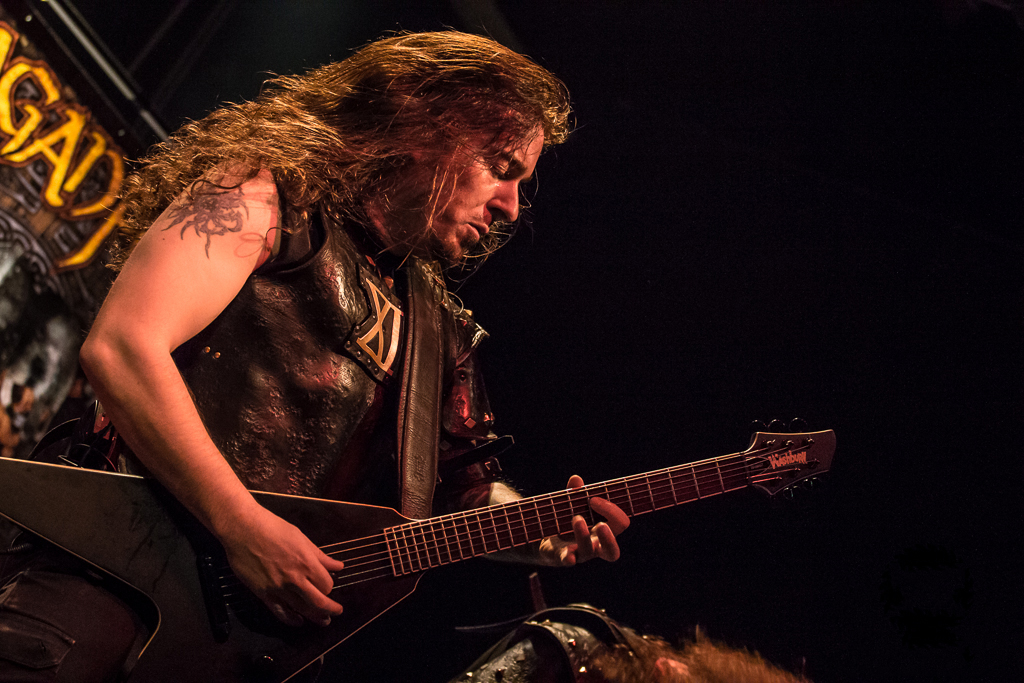
Jean-Francois Dagenais

Current

- Maurizio Iacono - vocals, bass
- Stéphane Barbe – lead guitar
- Jean-François Dagenais – rhythm guitar, producer
- Dano Apekian – bass guitar
- James Payne – drums

Former

- François Mongrain – bass guitar (2009)
- Max Duhamel – drums
- Jonathan Lefrancois-Leduc – keyboards
- Oli Beaudoin – drums
- Jereamie Kling – drums

== Discography ==
Studio albums

- Romulus (2009)
- Caligvla (2012)
- The Immortal Wars (2017)
- The Thirteen Years of Nero (2021)

EPs

- Year of the Four Emperors (2025)

Singles

- "Romulus" (2009)

Split releases

- "Romulus" / "Cruise Ship Terror" (2009)

Music videos

- Romulus (2010)
- The Final War (Battle of Actium) (2010)
- I, Caligvla (2012)
- Per Oculus Aquila (2012)
- The Tiberius Cliff (2012)
- The Rise Of Hannibal (2016)
- The Roman (2017)
- The Philosopher King (2020)
- Boudicca (2021)
- Imperator (2021)
- The Head of the Snake (2021)
