= Christ Church Parish Church =

Church in Christ Church, Barbados

Coordinates: 13°03′55.00″N 59°32′17.60″W

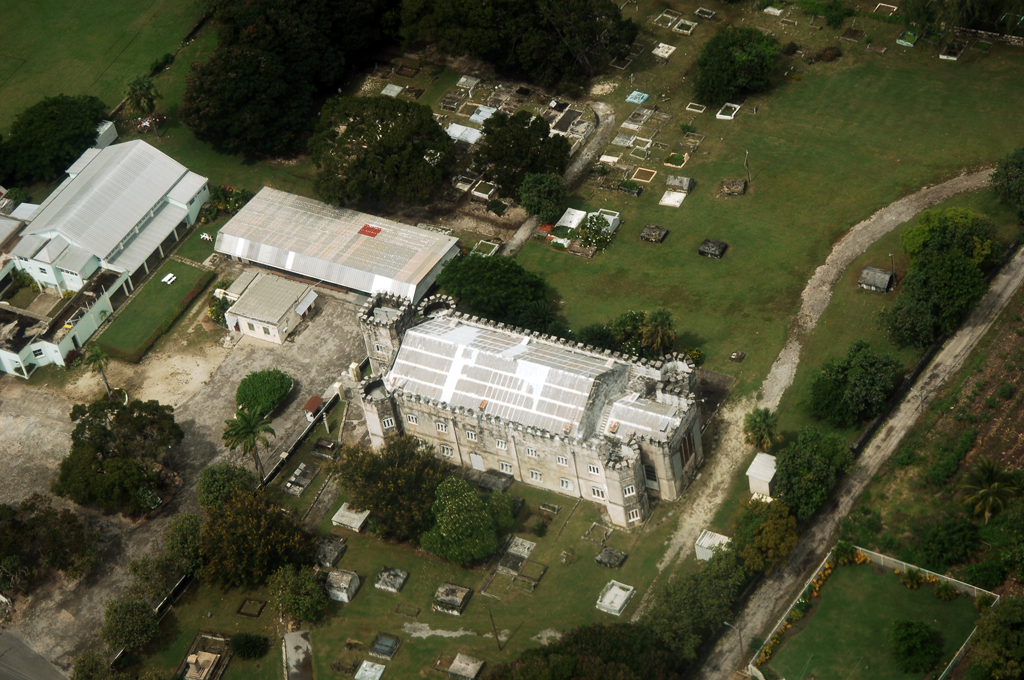
Christ Church's Parish church.

The current Christ Church Parish Church located in Church Hill, Christ Church, Barbados was built in 1935 and is the fifth parish church on the site. At various times the previous structures have all been destroyed by natural disasters including flood, fire or hurricanes.

The original Parish church structure was built in 1629 and was located near Dover Beach. In 1669 the church was destroyed by a flood, which scattered coffins and bones from the church cemetery across the beach.

The next church constructed was destroyed in the hurricane of 1780. Another Parish Church was built in 1786 and was again destroyed by the 1831 hurricane. The new church was then destroyed by fire in 1935.

The church is known for its churchyard which contains the notorious Chase Vault, in which coffins have been said to mysteriously move around within the sealed vault. A detailed investigation by the Governor of Barbados and members of his staff was made in 1820 but it offered no explanation and the coffins were eventually each buried separately after further recurrences. Today visitors are able to visit the vault at the church site.
