= Clemens Wijers =

Dutch keyboardist, pianist, and composer (born 1983)

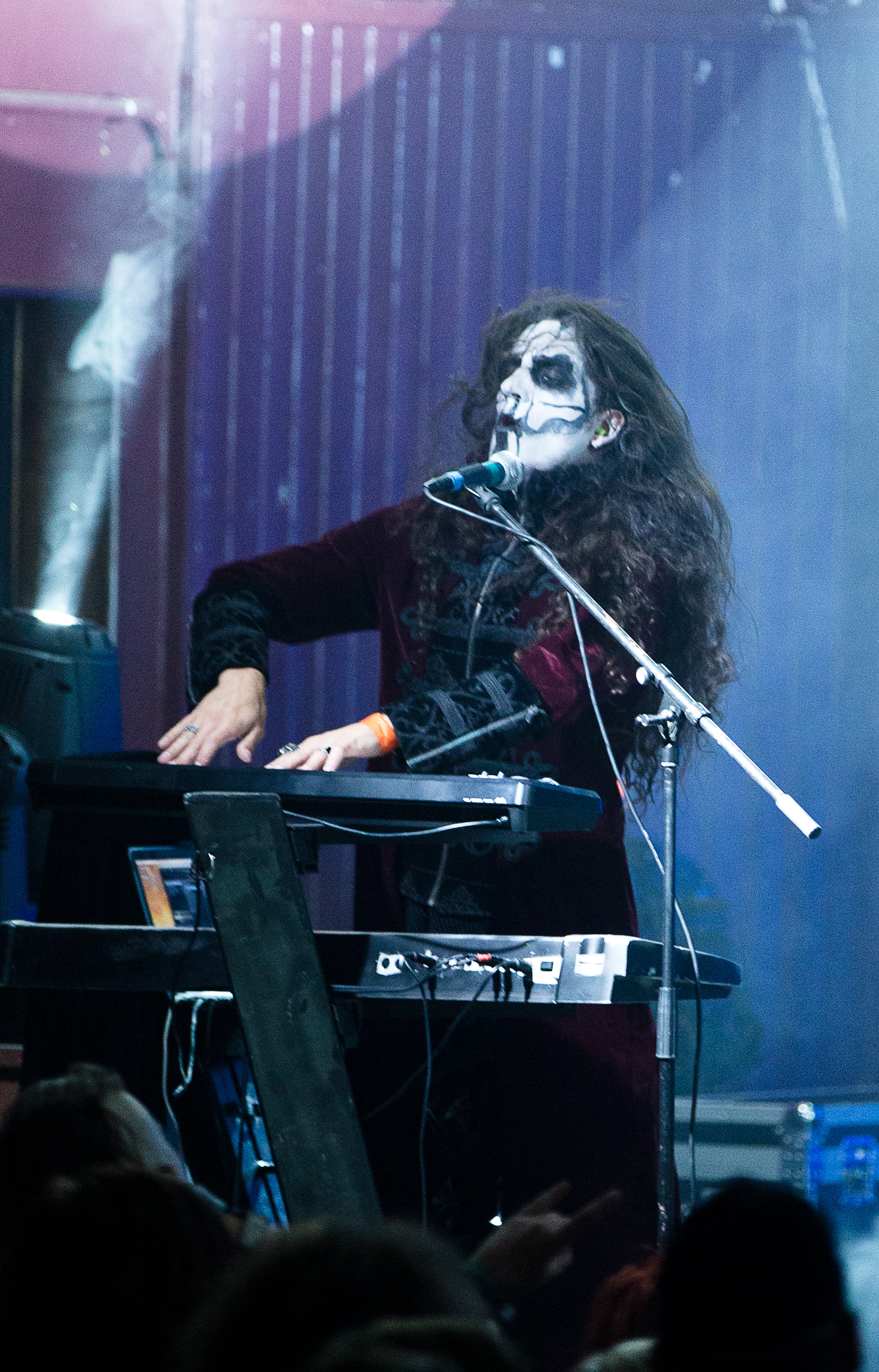
- Ardek performing with Carach Angren at Wave-Gotik-Treffen 2016 in Leipzig, Germany.

Background information
- Also known as: Ardek
- Born: 10 November 1983 (age 42); Southern Netherlands
- Genres: Symphonic black metal, Black metal, Classical, Industrial
- Occupations: Keyboardist, songwriter
- Instruments: Keyboard, Piano
- Years active: 2002–present
- Labels: Season of Mist, Maddening Media, Clemens Wijers Music Productions
- Member of: Carach Angren
- Formerly of: Dark Mutation; Vaultage
- Website: http://www.clemenswijers.com

Clemens "Ardek" Wijers (born 10 November 1983) is a Dutch keyboardist, pianist, and composer best known as the keyboardist of Dutch symphonic black metal band Carach Angren. Prior to forming Carach Angren with his brother Ivo "Namtar" Wijers and Dennis "Seregor" Droomers, he played with Dark Mutation and Vaultage. Wijers has written songs for Rammstein singer Till Lindemann's side project Lindemann and solo album, in addition to contributing orchestration and orchestral arrangements for Lindemann, Pain, Ex Deo and Joe Lynn Turner. He has also composed several soundtrack albums and provided soundtracks for short films.

== Career ==
Wijers first started playing piano at the age of seven and played with a local youth choir throughout his teen years. As a teenager, he was listening to dance music before being introduced to metal at age fifteen and joined a band as a way of combining his new interest with his classical background. Wijers studied music at the Tilburg Conservatory in 2002 before forming Vaultage that same year, and co-founding Carach Angren together with his brother Ivo "Namtar" Wijers and Dennis "Seregor" Droomers in 2003. Wijers is the band's main composer, while bandmate Droomers writes the lyrics and stories. Wijers has stated that he is influenced by classical composers, movies and soundtracks. He particularly enjoys video game soundtracks, having been a gamer in the 1990s and a fan of the Doom series.

Alongside Carach Angren, Wijers released his debut solo album titled Worlds in 2017, which mainly featured a combination of industrial and classical music tracks. His second solo album, Worlds II, was released in 2021. Wijers has also written songs and contributed orchestration for Till Lindemann and Peter Tägtgren's side project Lindemann. He further collaborated with singer Lindemann as a producer and songwriter on his debut solo album, Zunge, and contributed orchestral arrangements for Tägtgren's project Pain on their album Coming Home. He has also provided orchestration for Ex Deo and Joe Lynn Turner. Wijers has composed several soundtrack albums, soundtracks for short films, and offers music lessons.

== Discography ==
=== Solo ===
Studio albums

- Worlds (2017)
- Worlds II (2021)

Studio EPs

- Parasite Twin (2019)

=== With Carach Angren ===
Studio albums

- The Chase Vault Tragedy (2004)
- Lammendam (2008)
- Death Came Through a Phantom Ship (2010)
- Where the Corpses Sink Forever (2012)
- This is no Fairytale (2015)
- Dance and Laugh Amongst the Rotten (2017)
- Franckensteina Strataemontanus (2020)

Studio EPs

- Ethereal Veiled Existence (2005)

=== With Vaultage ===
Studio EPs

- Hallucinate Beyond (2003)

=== Production, writing, instrumental and vocal credits ===
Year	Artist	Title	Song(s)	Notes
2011	Vredehammer	Pans Skygge	"Oktober"	Composer
2015	Bodyfarm	Battle Breed	"Hell March (Intro)"	Orchestration
2015	Lindemann	Skills in Pills	"That's My Heart"	Composer, additional vocals
2015	Lindemann	Skills in Pills		Additional orchestral arrangements
2016	Pain	Coming Home		Orchestral arrangements
2017	Ex Deo	The Immortal Wars		Orchestration
2017	Utbyrd	Varskrik		Orchestration
2020	Lindemann	F & M	"Wer weiß das schon"	Composer
2020	Lindemann	F & M		Additional ochestral arrangements
2021	Lindemann	Live in Moscow	"Intro", "Credits"	Composer
2021	Ex Deo	The Thirteen Years of Nero		Orchestration
2022	L'Âme Immortelle	In Tiefem Fall		Disc 2 - Portrait Of A Shattered Mind Composer, piano, choir, violin
2022	Joe Lynn Turner	Belly of the Beast	"Tortured Soul", "Dark Night Of The Soul"	Additional orchestration
2023	Till Lindemann	Zunge	"Alles für die Kinder"	Songwriter, producer, engineer, instruments, backing vocals

== See also ==
- Carach Angren
- Dennis "Seregor" Droomers
