= Christopher Farnsworth =

American novelist and screenwriter

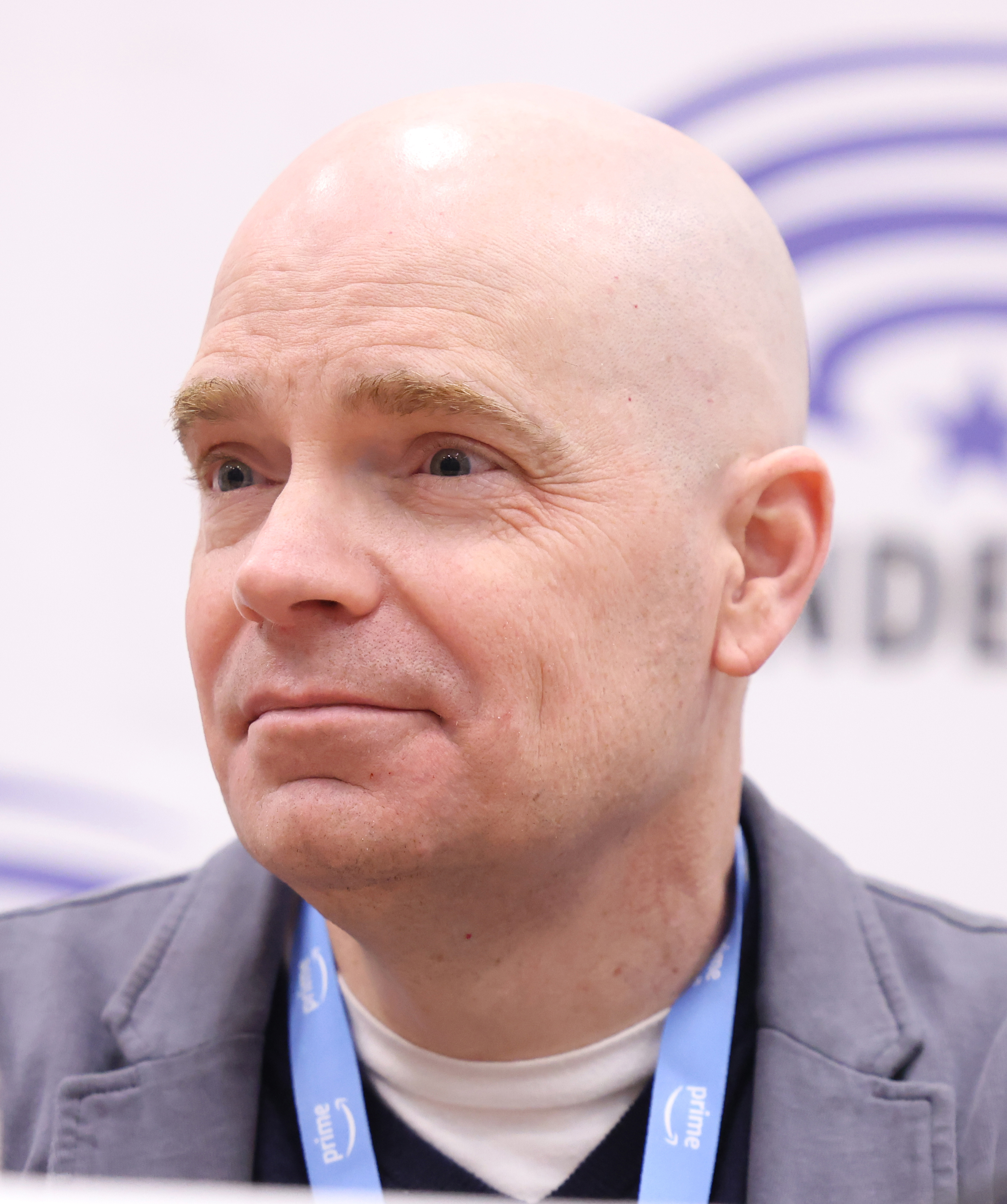
- Farnsworth in 2025
- Born: 1971 (age 54–55)
- Occupations: Novelist; screenwriter
- Website: www.chrisfarnsworth.com

Christopher Farnsworth (born 1971) is an American novelist and screenwriter. He is the author of the President's Vampire series of novels from G.P. Putnam's Sons and a former journalist.

Huso is an Idaho native who graduated from the College of Idaho in 1993.

== Published works ==
=== Standalone novels ===
- The Eternal World (2015)
- Reunion (2022)

=== Nathaniel Cade series ===
- Blood Oath (2010)
- The President's Vampire (2011)
- Red, White, and Blood (2012)
- The Burning Men: A Nathaniel Cade Story (2014, novella)
- Deep State: A Nathaniel Cade Story (2017, novella)

=== John Smith series ===
- Killfile (2016)
- Flashmob (2017)

=== Robert B. Parker's Jesse Stone series ===
- Buried Secrets (2025)
- Big Shot (2026)
