= Chase Vault =

Burial place in Christ Church, Barbados

Coordinates: 13.0653°N 59.5382°W

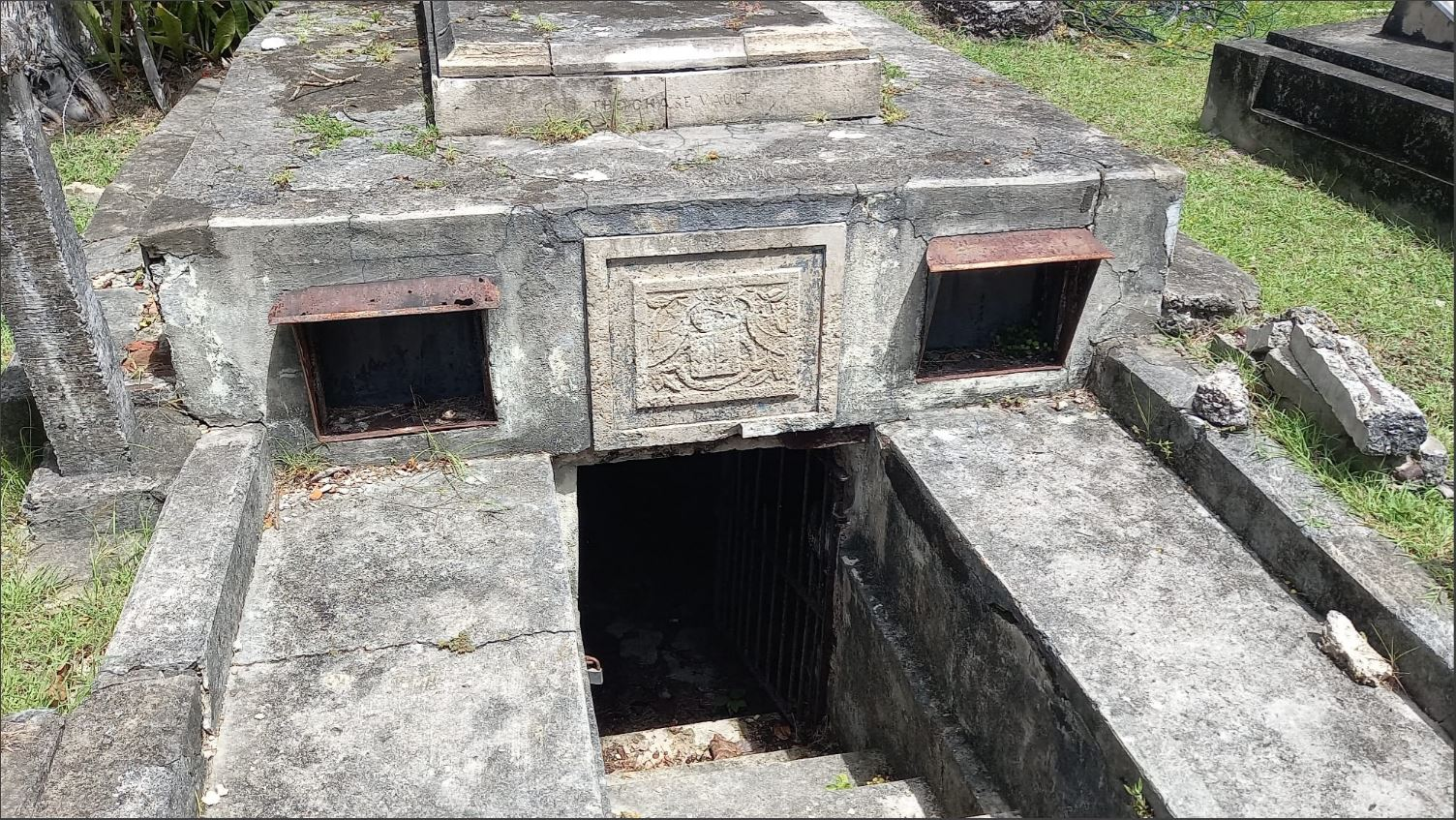
Chase Vault (now abandoned) at Christ Church Parish Church, Barbados

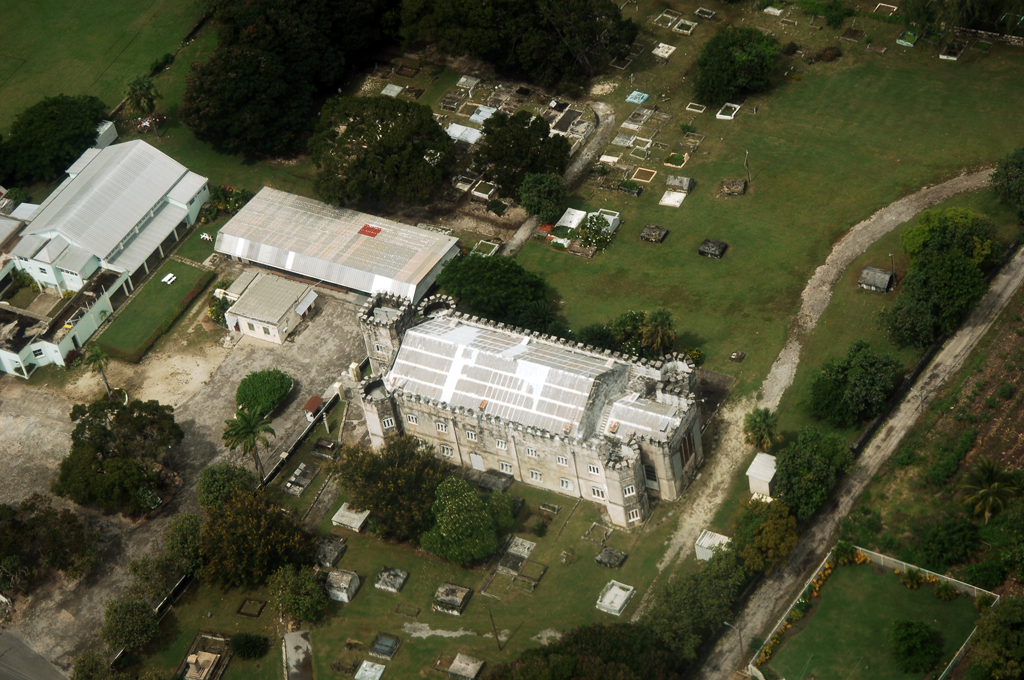
Christ Church Parish Church in 2005

The Chase Vault is a burial vault in the cemetery of the Christ Church Parish Church in Oistins, Christ Church, Barbados, best known for a widespread urban legend of "mysterious moving coffins". According to the story, each time the heavily sealed marble vault was opened for the burial of a family member, including in 1808, twice in 1812 and in 1816 and 1819, all of the lead coffins had changed position. The facts of the story are unverified; investigations have concluded there may not be actual events at the base of the legend.

== The story ==
The first published version of the story appeared in 1833 in (General) James Edward Alexander's Transatlantic Sketches. According to Alexander, a Mrs. Goddard was buried in the vault in 1807, followed in 1808 by 2-year-old Ann Maria Chase, and in 1812 by her older sister Dorcas Chase, aged 12. When the vault was opened again in late 1812 for the burial of their father Thomas Chase, the caskets of the Chase girls were said to be found "in a confused state, having been apparently tossed from their places." Alexander wrote that when the vault was later opened "to receive the body of another infant, the four coffins, all of lead, all very heavy, were much disturbed" and that similar disturbances were found when opening the vault for burials in 1816 and 1819:

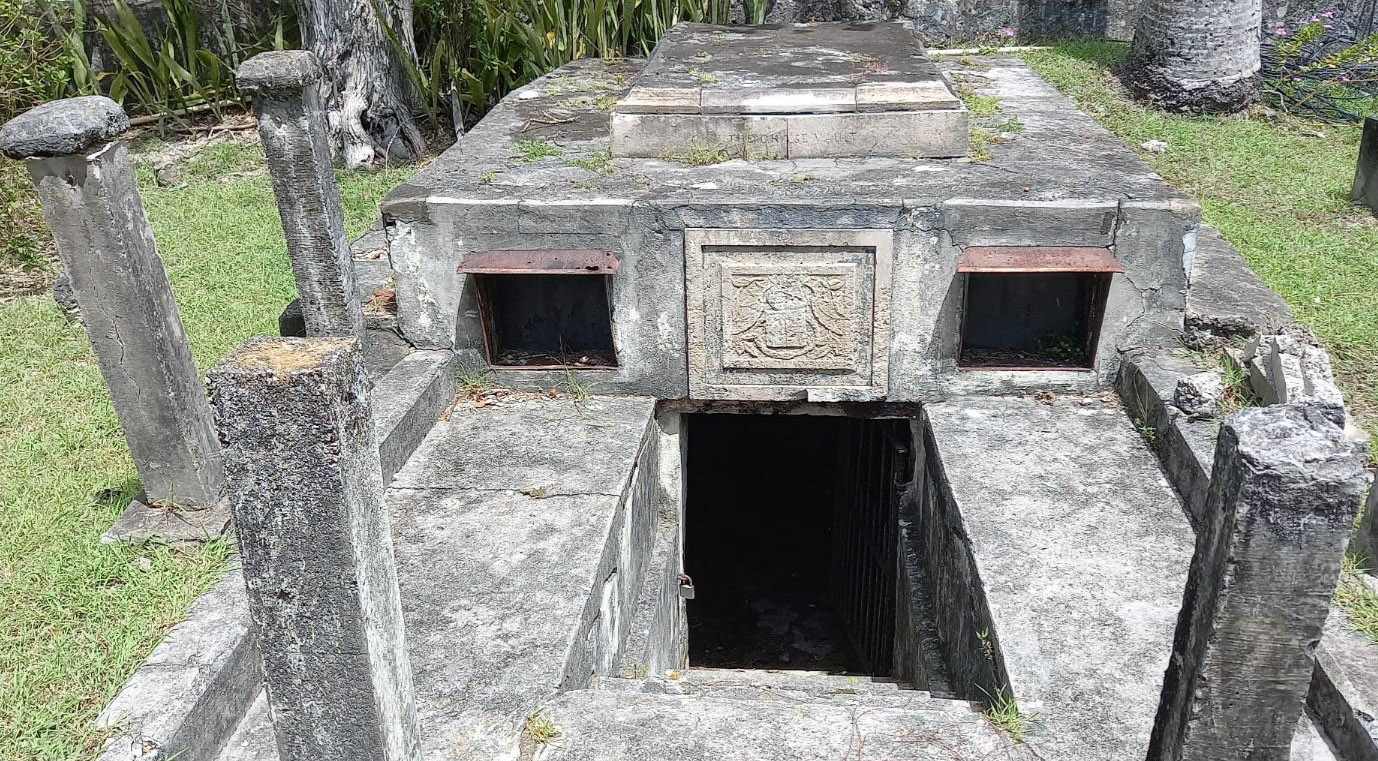
Chase Vault (now abandoned) at Christ Church Parish Church, Barbados

Each time that the vault was opened the coffins were replaced in their proper situations, that is, three on the ground side by side, and the others laid on them. The vault was then regularly closed; the door (a massive stone which required six or seven men to move) was cemented by masons; and though the floor was of sand there were no marks of footsteps or water. The last time the vault was opened was in 1819, with the Governor of Barbados Lord Combermere present, when opened the coffins were found confusedly thrown about the vault, some with their heads down and others up. What could have occasioned this phenomenon? In no other vault in the island has this ever occurred. Was it an earthquake which occasioned it, or the effects of an inundation in the vault?

Different versions of the story appeared over the years, with other accounts published in 1844 and 1860.

== The origins ==
According to author Jerome Clark, the story of the Chase Vault appears to originate from anecdotes told by Thomas H. Orderson, Rector of Christ Church during the 1800s. Orderson gave "conflicting accounts" of the tale, each containing variations. Clark says the story was subsequently repeated in Alexander's 1833 Transatlantic Sketches, and further repeated the same year in the "Anecdote Gallery" section of Reuben Percy's The Mirror of Literature, Amusement, and Instruction.

Clark says that most stories that proliferated about the Chase Vault referred back to sources that could be traced to one of Orderson's accounts, and that Scottish folklorist Andrew Lang identified the differing versions told by Orderson in a December 1907 article published in Folk-Lore Journal. After combing through existing documentation to determine the veracity of the Chase Vault stories, Lang reported that he could find nothing to substantiate them, either in the burial register of Christ Church or in contemporary newspapers on Barbados, aside from an "unpublished firsthand account" by a Nathan Lucas, who claimed to be present at the opening of the vault in April 1820. The Governor ordered the bodies be re-interred in separate burial plots, with the vault now sealed and empty.

The story of the moving coffins attracted a fair bit of attention in Victorian society. Arthur Conan Doyle commented about the case, speculating that animal magnetism might be involved.

Skeptical investigator Joe Nickell and folklorist Benjamin Radford both point out significant details of the story vary from one source to another and that the missing account from Nathan Lucas was actually attributed to him by another unidentified source, leaving us with no direct testimony from anybody claiming to be an eyewitness. That contemporary sources from the island don't mention the incident throws doubt on the basic elements of the story. Examining the interior of the vault in 2019, Radford observed that the bricks were intact, showing no damage from lead-lined, moving coffins.

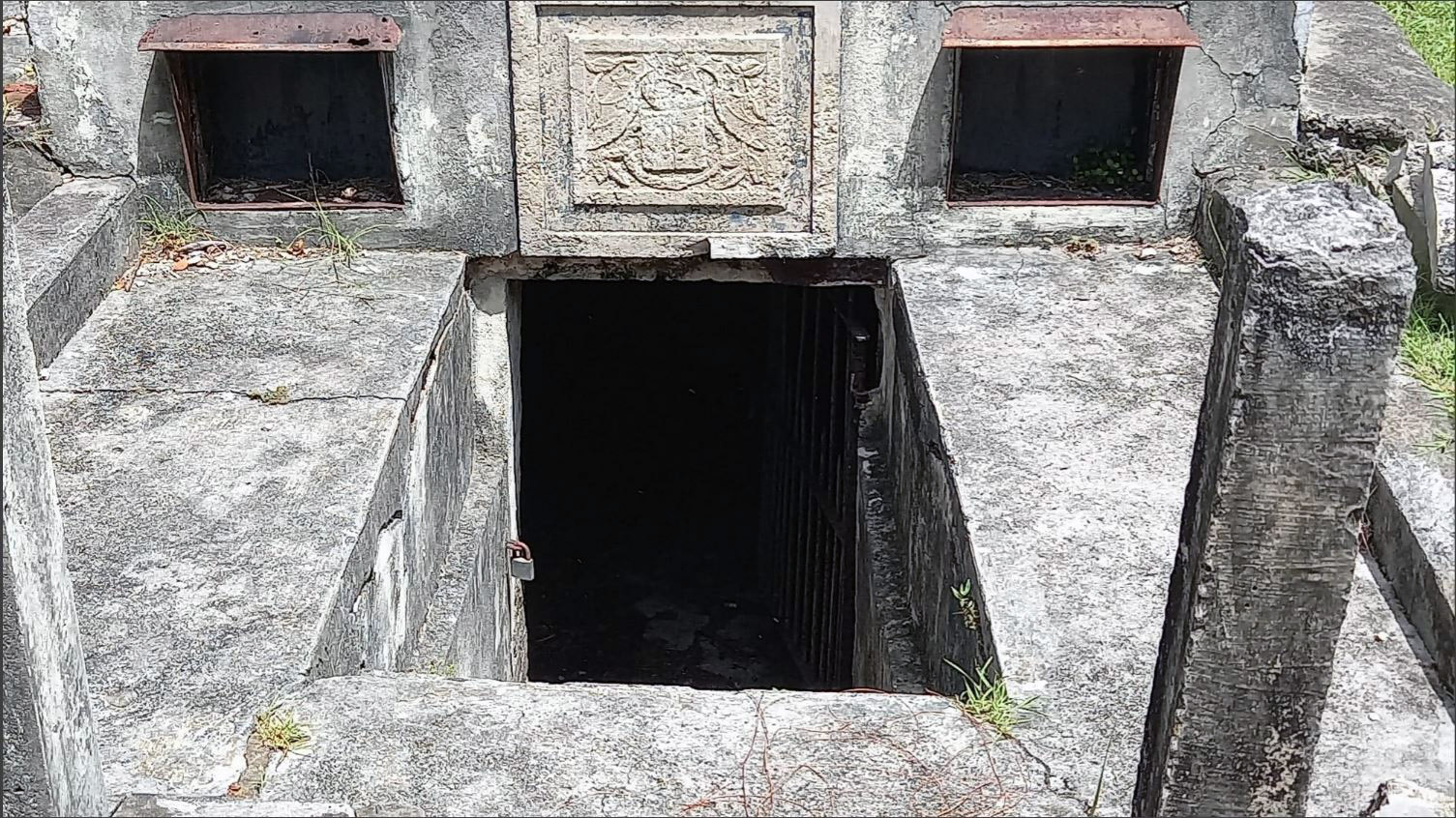
Chase Vault (now abandoned) at Christ Church Parish Church, Barbados

== Moving coffin legends ==
Nickell said that stories about the Chase Vault were often repeated, but he called them "historically dubious." Having investigated an earlier alleged Masonic hoax involving a tale of buried treasure at Oak Island, he contended that whoever fashioned the Barbados story was familiar with the Masonic allegory of a "secret vault" which, according to a Masonic text, "was ... in the ancient mysteries, symbolic of death, where alone Divine Truth is to be found." Nickell wrote that two of the men named in the Chase Vault story were members of Ancient Free and Accepted Masons, and that a similar tale of "restless coffins" was circulated in 1943 that specifically included a party of Freemasons and a vault containing the founder of Freemasonry in Barbados. Nickell noted that Chase Vault stories were loaded with symbols and phrases which Freemasons would have recognized.

Radford places the Chase Vault story within a small body of legends about ambulatory coffins around the world, including several examples from Barbados, some predating the Chase case. He labels it as "one version of a broader moving coffin legend that happens to have been imbued with Freemason allegory [...] There’s no evidence that anyone (Freemason or otherwise) intentionally created or hoaxed the story; instead they did what all humans do when they hear a good story: they retold the "true story" and changed it in the process, emphasizing and adding elements according to their beliefs and agendas."

== Notes ==
- Gould, Rupert T. (1969). Oddities. New York: Paperback Library.
