= Love Is a Promise Whispering Goodbye =

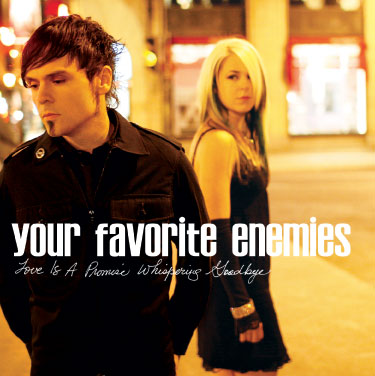

EP by Your Favorite Enemies
- Released: June 17, 2008
- Recorded: 2008 in Québec
- Genre: Alternative rock/emo
- Length: 31:04
- Label: Hopeful Tragedy Records
- Producer: Your Favorite Enemies

Your Favorite Enemies chronology
And If I Was To Die In The Morning… Would I Still Be Sleeping With You (2007)	Love Is a Promise Whispering Goodbye (2008)

Love Is a Promise Whispering Goodbye is the second EP of Canadian alternative rock-emo band Your Favorite Enemies, which was released on June 17, 2008. The album was produced from Canadian label Hopeful Tragedy Records, which the band founded in April 2008 for releasing their debut album, And If I Was To Die In The Morning… Would I Still Be Sleeping With You. It includes seven songs, two new songs, a radio edit and an acoustic version of "Open Your Eyes", three other acoustic songs and three music videos. The album was produced by Your Favorite Enemies and mixed by the band. Only a few weeks following its release, the album was successfully acclaimed on their Japan-Indonesia-World-Tour in 2008.

== Track listing ==
A-Side
No.	Title	Length
1.	"Open Your Eyes (Radio edit)"	3:41
2.	"The Voice Inside"	4:07
3.	"Would You Believe"	4:15
4.	"Little Sister (Acoustic version)"	4:53
5.	"Midnight's Crashing (Acoustic version)"	4:43
6.	"No Time Left For Confusion (Acoustic version)"	4:51
7.	"Open Your Eyes (Acoustic version)"	4:35

B-Side
No.	Title	Length
1.	"Open Your Eyes (Radio edit)"	3:41
2.	"Sunset Blow"	$:00
3.	"No Time Left For Confusion"	$:00
4.	"Little Sister (Acoustic version)"	4:53
5.	"Midnight's Crashing (Acoustic version)"	4:43
6.	"No Time Left For Confusion (Acoustic version)"	4:51
7.	"Open Your Eyes (Acoustic version)"	4:35

=== Videos ===
- Open Your Eyes (Official video)
- I Might Be Wrong (Live from Paris 2007)
- We Are Your Favorite Enemies (Thousand Lights For Million Souls)

== Personnel ==
- Alex Foster - Vocals
- Miss Isabell - Keyboard/Backing vocals
- Jeff Beaulieu - Guitar
- Sef Lemelin - Guitar
- Ben Lemelin - Bass guitar
- Charles "Moose" Alicy - Drums
