= Windows in the Sky =

2018 studio album by Alex Henry Foster

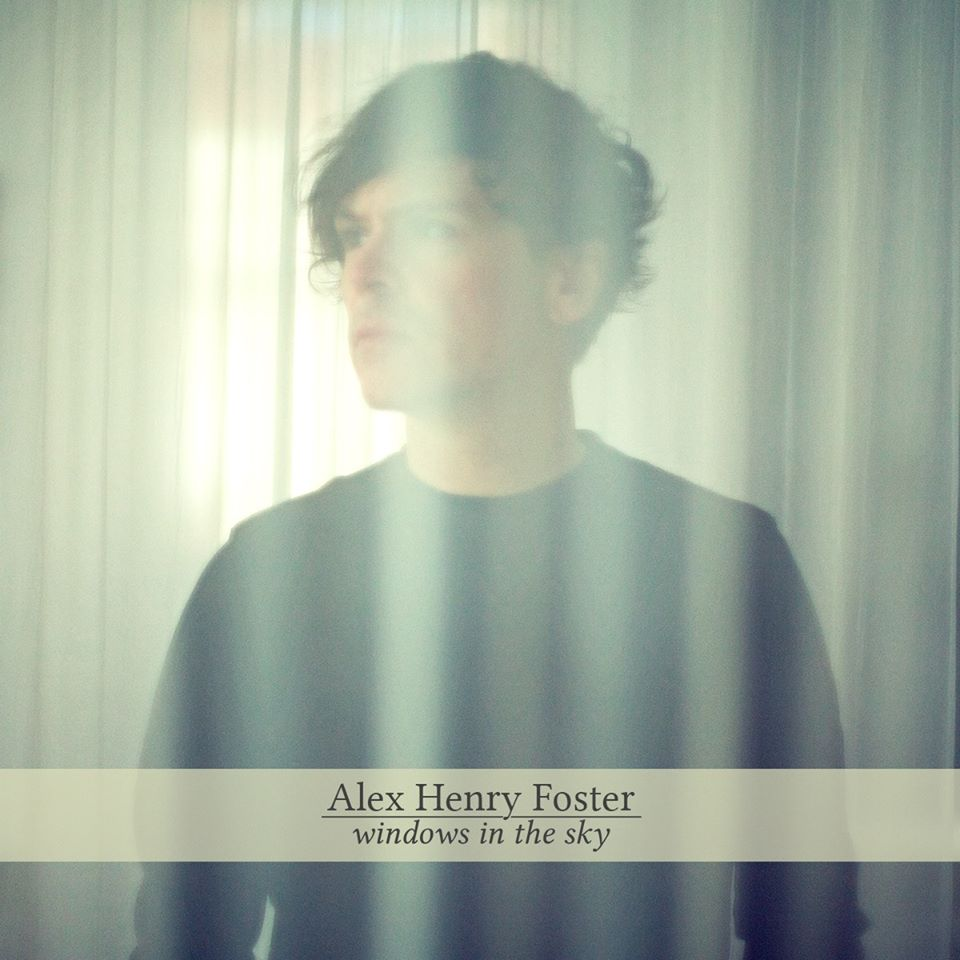

Studio album by Alex Henry Foster
- Released: November 9, 2018
- Recorded: 2018
- Studio: Upper Room
- Length: 62:00
- Labels: Hopeful Tragedy; Sony Music; The Orchard

Alex Henry Foster chronology
Windows in the Sky (2018)	Kimiyo (2024)

Windows in the Sky is the debut solo studio album by Your Favorite Enemies vocalist Alex Henry Foster. It is an 8-track poetry essay about finding peace, faith and hope through the context of grief, depression, and distress.

It was released in Canada on November 9, 2018, through Hopeful Tragedy Records and Sony Music, The Orchard. The album charted at #1 in the Canadian iTunes charts in the first week of its release, ahead of Muse and Imagine Dragons. It reached #6 on the Billboard charts in Canada on the second week of its release. In 2019, it was nominated for "Anglophone Album of the Year" by ADISQ.

In February and March 2020, Foster and his band went on tour across Europe alongside ...And You Will Know Us by the Trail of Dead in support of Foster's first solo album. The European Winter Tour consisted of 26 concerts across ten countries.

Windows in the Sky was released in Japan on March 20, 2020. The release included an additional live record with songs performed at Foster's first concert as a solo artist at the Festival International de Jazz de Montréal on July 5, 2019.

On May 1, 2020, the album was released worldwide through a broadcast in partnership with Prog (magazine). It consisted of a 60-minute concert by Alex Henry Foster and his band The Long Shadows, live from their studio near Montréal, Canada, established in a former Catholic church.

The international release landed a front page appearance on Rolling Stone magazine in France.

== Background ==
The album Windows in the Sky was written as Foster was in a complete state of isolation in Tangier, Morocco. He went there following the death of his father, a firm believer who died of cancer. His trip was meant to be of four weeks during which he would write the next album of his band Your Favorite Enemies. It turned into 2 years and he wrote what became Windows in the Sky.

== Recording and composition ==
Windows in the Sky was written and composed in Tangier, Morocco in a recording space Foster and his bandmates put together to work on the creation of his solo record in 2018. Additional recording sessions and the mix of the album took place at Foster's studio, The Upper Room, established in a former Catholic church near Montréal, Canada. This is also where they have settled the headquarters of their independent record label, Hopeful Tragedy Records, since 2009. Additional recordings also took place in Foster's home studio in Virginia, United States.

== Track listing ==
All tracks are written by Alex Henry Foster.

No.	Title	Length
1.	"The Pain That Bonds (The Beginning Is the End)"	5:01
2.	"Winter Is Coming In"	7:45
3.	"Shadows of Our Evening Tides" (Featuring: Excerpts of the poem "Song" recited by Allen Ginsberg)	7:43
4.	"The Hunter (By the Seaside Window)"	14:36
5.	"Snowflakes in July"	7:18
6.	"Summertime Departures"	5:23
7.	"Lavender Sky"	6:17
8.	"The Love That Moves (The End Is Beginning)"	7:33

Japanese edition bonus material
No.	Title	Length
1.	"The Son of Hannah [Live from Festival International de Jazz de Montréal July 5, 2019]"	8:41
2.	"Shadows of Our Evening Tides [Live from Festival International de Jazz de Montréal July 5, 2019]"	19:25
3.	"The Hunter (By the Seaside Window) [Live from Festival International de Jazz de Montréal July 5, 2019]"	21:19
4.	"Summertime Departures (Sometimes I Dream) [Live from Festival International de Jazz de Montréal July 5, 2019]"	12:55
5.	"Lavender Sky [Live from Festival International de Jazz de Montréal July 5, 2019]"	6:25

== Reception ==
Foster says that Windows in the Sky had been released without any ambition. Despite the lack of promotion before its release, the album reached the top of the iTunes and the Canadian charts on its first week of release. On July 5, 2019, Foster and his band were invited to perform at the Festival International de Jazz de Montréal. Soon after, Alex Henry Foster and his band received the invitation to join ...And You Will Know Us by the Trail of Dead on their 2020 winter European tour.

Windows in the Sky garnered press coverage across Canada with TV channels such as CBC News and Le Canal Nouvelles (LCN) inviting Foster in their studios. Other Canadian media such as La Presse, Journal de Québec, Vancouver Sun, and the SOCAN magazine Words & Music, also talked about this album.

On an international scale, Guitar World described Windows in the Sky as "a cathartic mix of post-rock and noise-rock". Prog depicted it as "a furious storm of noise with raw, shouted vocals".

The English magazine Echoes And Dust said that Windows in the Sky "will certainly feature in more than a few end of year lists when that time comes back around".

== Release history ==
Region	Date	Label
Canada	November 9, 2018	Hopeful Tragedy Records, Sony Music, The Orchard
Japan	March 20, 2020	Hopeful Tragedy Records, Magniph Records
Worldwide	May 1, 2020	Hopeful Tragedy Records, Sony Music, The Orchard

== Charts ==
The album reached No. 6 on the Canadian Billboard on the second week of its release.

== Certifications ==
=== ADISQ ===
Year	Nominee / work	Award	Result
2019	Windows in the Sky	Anglophone Album of the Year	Nominated

== EPs ==
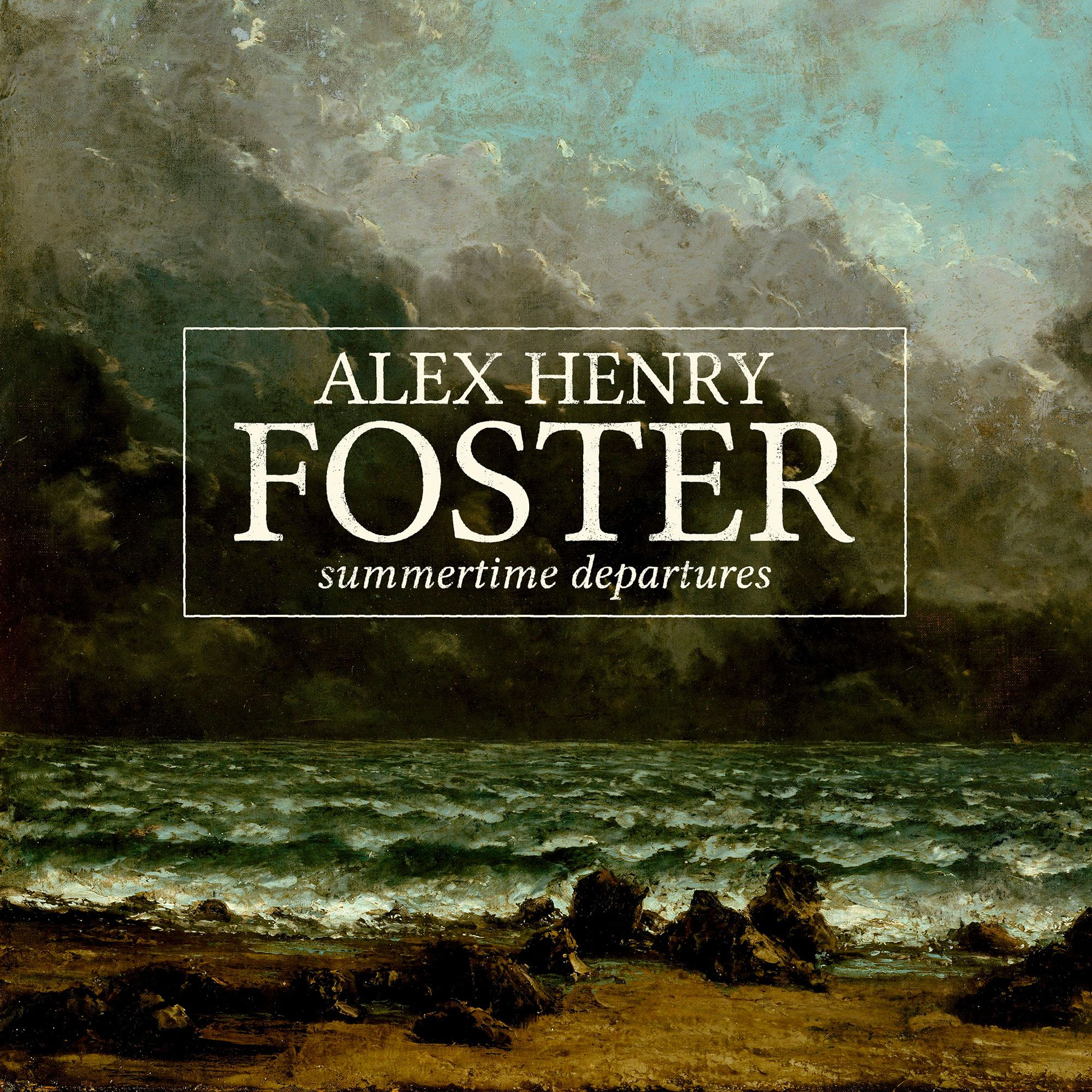

On January 17, 2020, Alex Henry Foster released a first EP for the single "Summertime Departures". It was released on streaming services as well as through a limited edition vinyl cut at Foster's record label Hopeful Tragedy Records' creative atelier, The Fabrik. On the same day, he released a videoclip featuring a live performance of the song at the Festival International de Jazz de Montréal.

All tracks are written by Alex Henry Foster.

No.	Title	Length
1.	"Summertime Departures"	5:23
2.	"Summertime Departures (Radio Edit)"	3:43
3.	"Summertime Departures (Sometimes I Dream)" (Live from the Festival International de Jazz de Montréal)	13:01

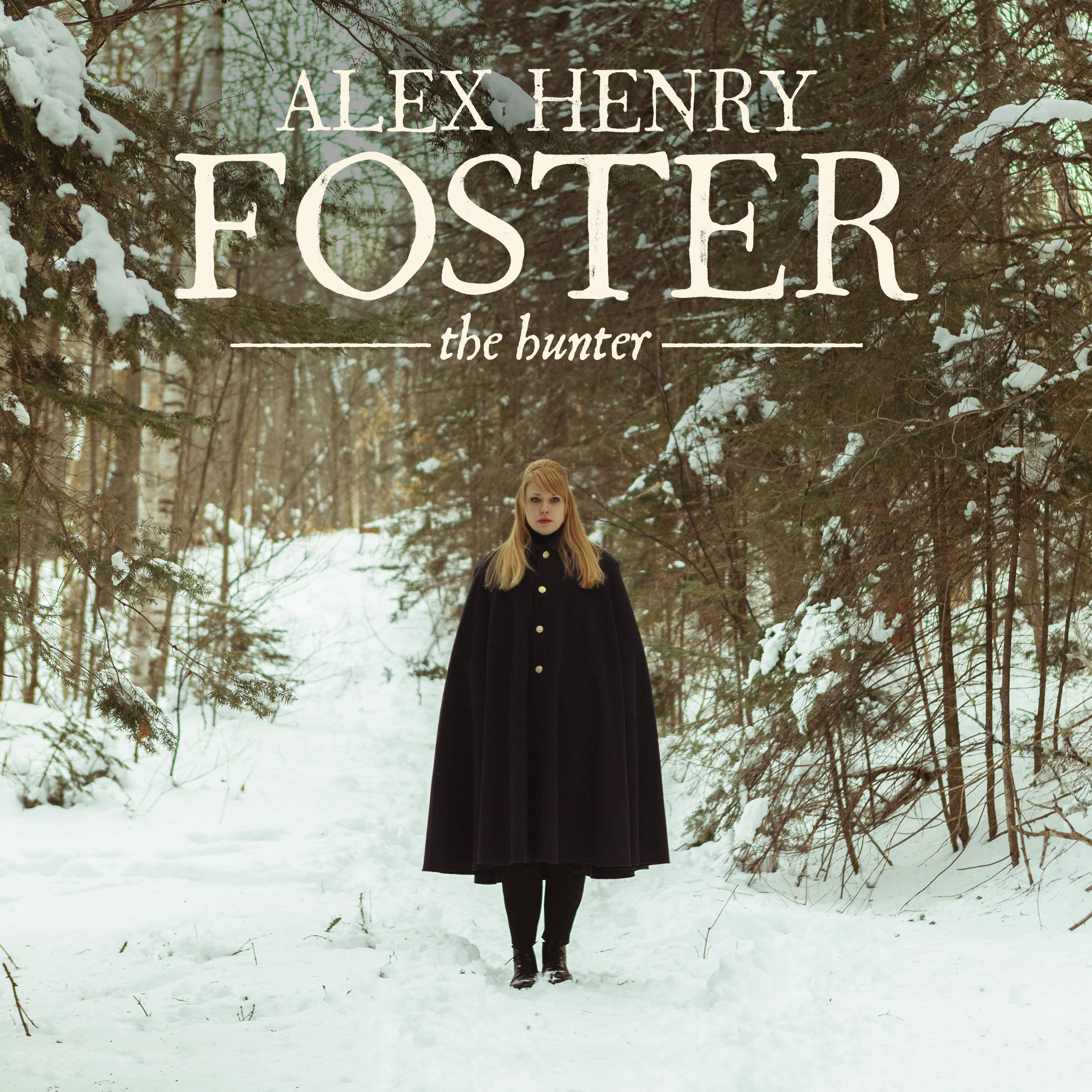

On March 13, 2020, a second EP was released for the song "The Hunter (By the Seaside Window)", on streaming services. It was also made available as a limited edition vinyl produced in Foster's record label's creative atelier. The launching of the EP was followed by the release of a short film in the likes of David Lynch. It was filmed in Montréal, Canada and produced in collaboration with Jessie Nottola, a French artist who also worked with Tinariwen, Tiken Jah Fakoly, Arthur H.

All tracks are written by Alex Henry Foster.

No.	Title	Length
1.	"The Hunter (By the Seaside Window)"	14:33
2.	"The Hunter (Radio Edit)"	3:40
3.	"The Hunter (By the Seaside Window)" (Live from the Festival International de Jazz de Montréal)	21:07

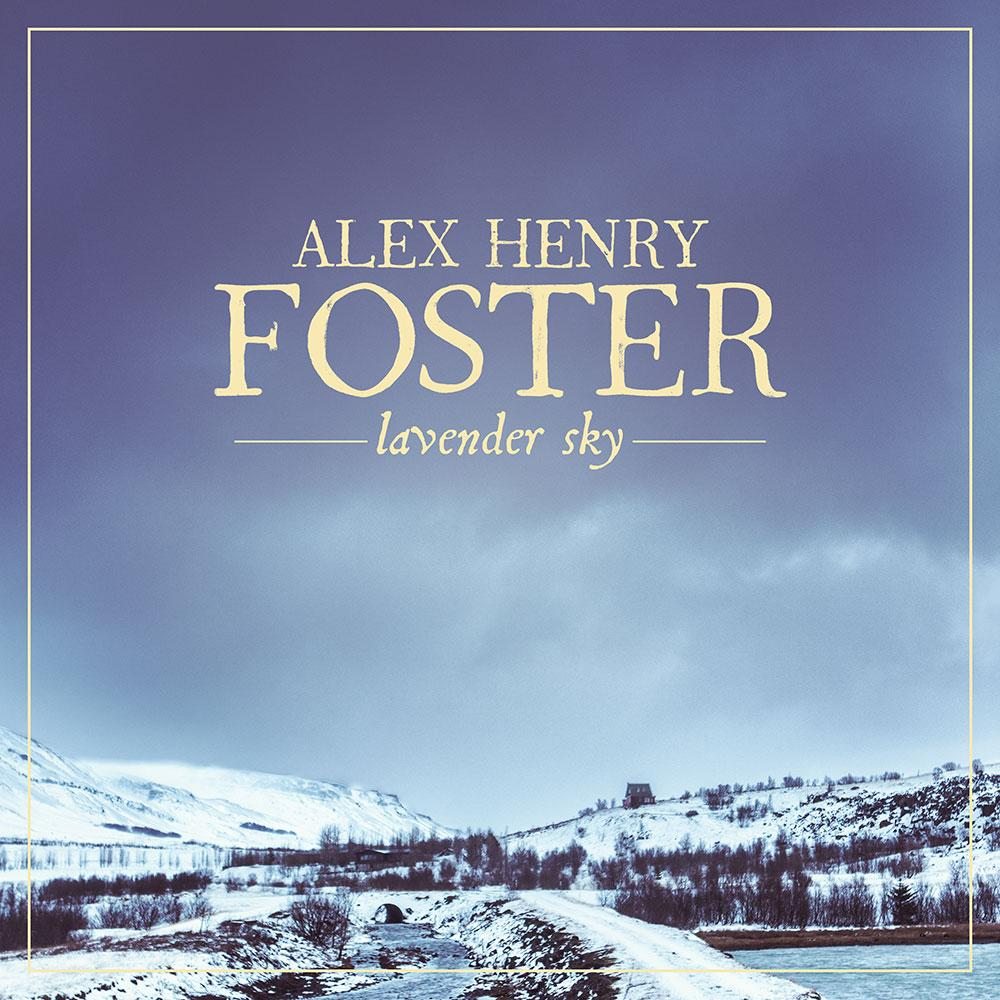

On June 19, 2020, a third EP was released for the song "Lavender Sky", on streaming services. It was also made available as a limited edition vinyl. The handmade vinyl was the object of Alex Henry Foster & The Long Shadows' very first direct-to-vinyl, which consisted of a live performance of the song "Lavender Sky", performed live from his studio-church near Montreal, Canada, on June 14, 2020. On June 26, 2020, he released a videoclip filmed in Iceland for the song "Lavender Sky". It was premiered and acclaimed by BrooklynVegan and talked about by British magazine NME.

All tracks are written by Alex Henry Foster.

No.	Title	Length
1.	"Lavender Sky"	6:17
2.	"Lavender Sky (Radio Edit)"	4:00
3.	"Lavender Sky (Live from the Upper Room Studio, June 14, 2020)"	17:28

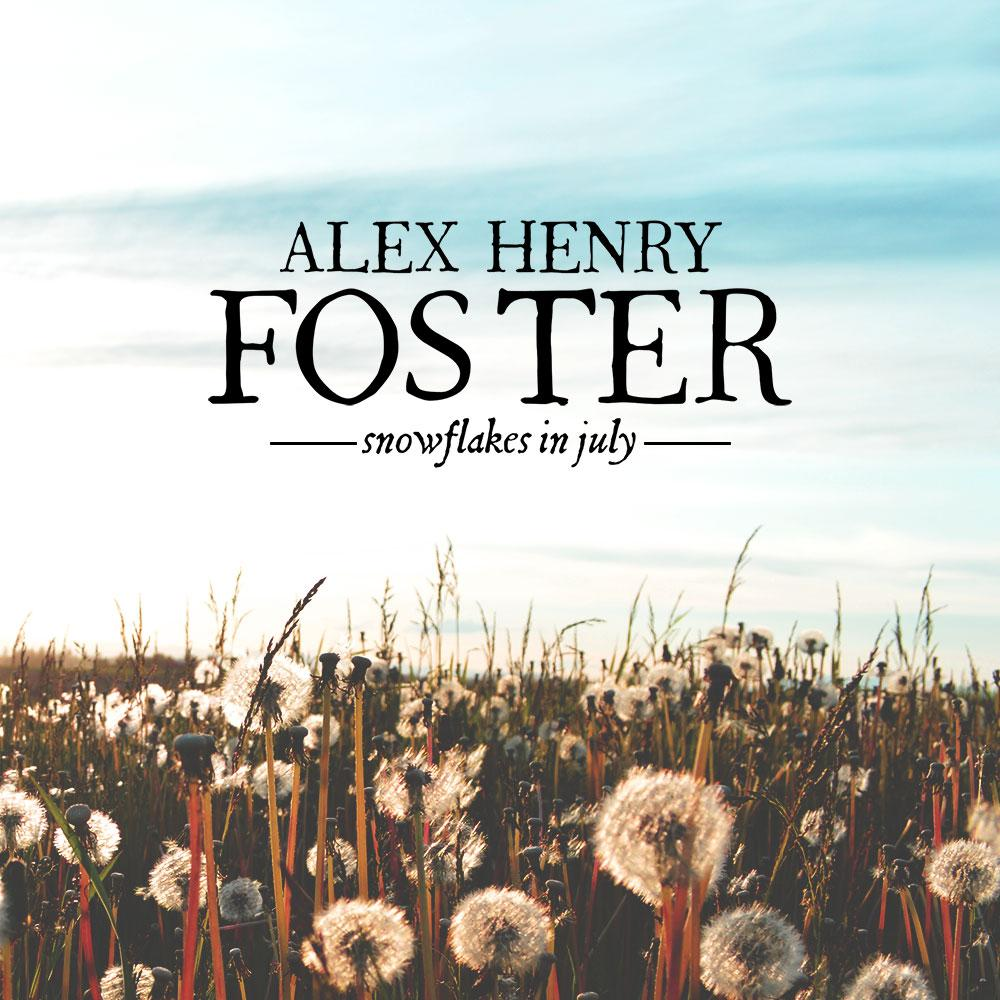

On July 26, 2020, Alex Henry Foster and his band The Long Shadows performed the song "Snowflakes in July" taken from the album "Windows in the Sky". Their live performance was broadcast live from their studio-church near Montreal, Canada, through BrooklynVegan, and turned into a collector direct-to-vinyl crafted in the band's independent record label's facilities.

On August 7, 2020, the EP, Snowflakes in July, was released worldwide. This fourth EP of the series marked the end of the album journey.

All tracks are written by Alex Henry Foster.

No.	Title	Length
1.	"Snowflakes in July"	7:17
2.	"Snowflakes in July (Radio Edit)"	4:20
3.	"Snowflakes in July (Live from The Upper Room Studio, July 26, 2020)"	16:51
