= Alex Henry Foster =

Canadian singer-songwriter and musician

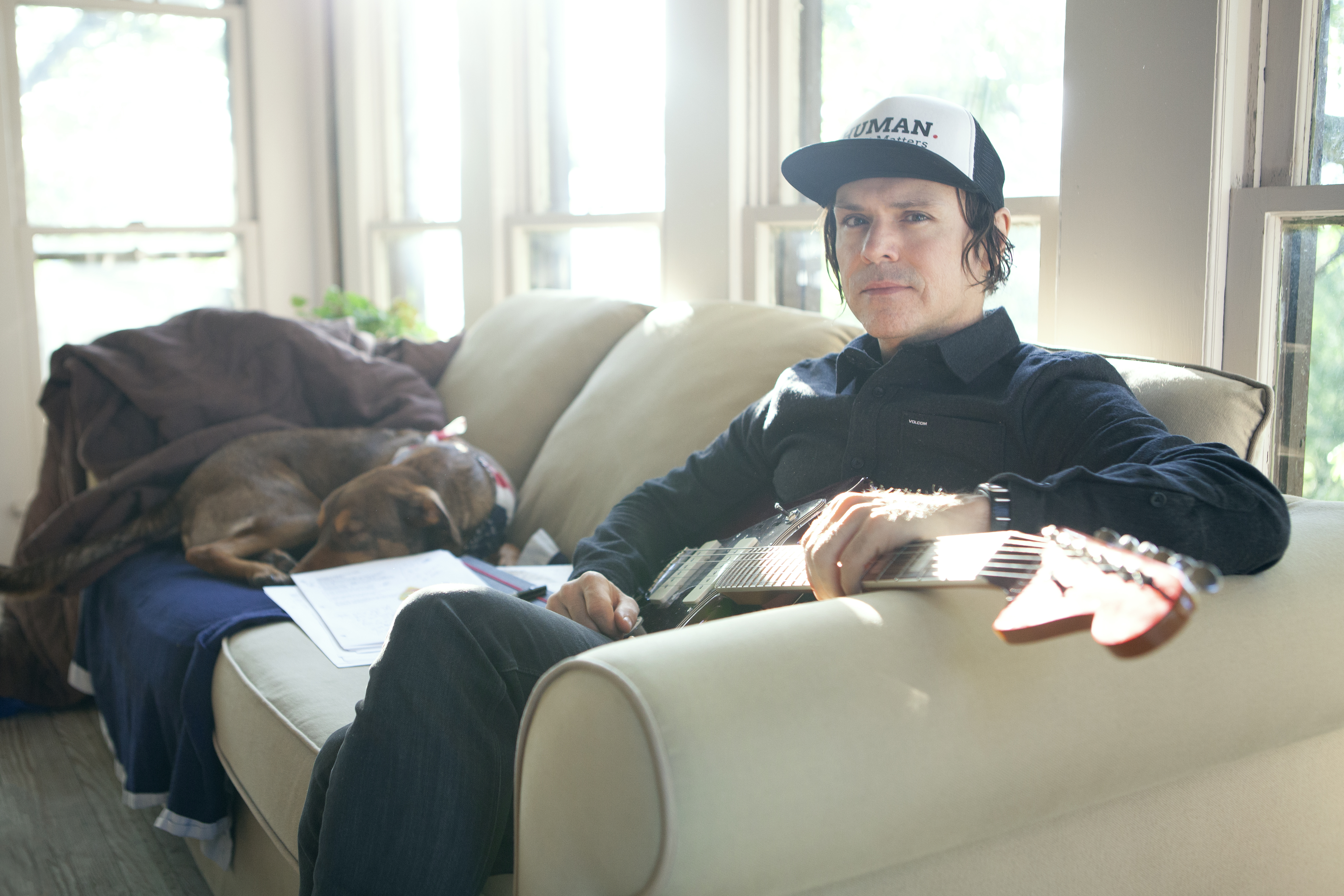

Background information
- Born: Montreal, Quebec, Canada
- Occupations: Singer, musician, writer
- Instruments: Vocals, guitar
- Label: Hopeful Tragedy Records
- Member of: Your Favorite Enemies

Alex Henry Foster is a Canadian artist, singer, musician, writer and activist, best known for being the singer and frontman of the Montreal band Your Favorite Enemies. The band was founded in 2006 and nominated for a Juno Award for their album Between Illness and Migration in 2015. In 2018, Foster announced the release of a first solo project, Windows in the Sky, through Hopeful Tragedy Records and Sony Music / The Orchard. His first solo album reached number 6 on the Billboard Canadian Albums Chart on the second week of its release. Alex Henry Foster was nominated at ADISQ for the first time in 2019 with his first solo effort "Windows in the Sky" for Anglophone album of the year.

In 2020, Alex Henry Foster and his band The Long Shadows went on their first tour, alongside ...And You Will Know Us by the Trail of Dead, playing concerts all across Europe.

On May 1, 2020, his first solo record entitled Windows in the Sky was released worldwide, with the launching event taking place on the online portal of Prog, through the broadcast of a 60-minute concert, live from Alex Henry Foster's studio established in a former Catholic church near Montreal city. He was also interviewed by Rolling Stone France upon his album release and was featured on the front page of the magazine.

On April 16, 2021, he released his first live album, Standing Under Bright Lights, taken from his live performance at the 40th Festival International de Jazz de Montréal. His sold-out concert was one of the most anticipated and successful shows of the festival. The album was given a 4.5/5 stars review by Le Devoir and 5/5 star reviews and got acclaimed in worldwide press coverage.

The week following its release, it made its Australian charts debut at No. 6 on the ARIA Top 50 Albums charts and reached the 4th position of the "Top 20" of UK's Official Independent Album Breakers Chart, No. 13 in the "Top 50" of the Official Independent Albums Chart, and No. 32 in the Top 100 "Official Albums Sales Chart".

The live album charted at No. 4 on the Billboard Canadian Albums chart, No. 18 in the Emerging Artists chart No. 31 in the Current Album Sales chart and No. 55 of the Album Sales chart, with FYI Music news confirming that the album scored the highest album sales for the week. In the week of April 30, 2021 to May 6, 2021, it made its entry in the Irish Albums Chart at No. 17 of the Top 50 and was the most downloaded album of the week.

In August 2021, Foster became the owner of the Moroccan boutique hotel "La Maison de Tanger", an oasis in the heart of the old city of Tangier and sought for by an international clientele for more than two decades.

On September 22, 2021, his live album Standing Under Bright Lights received an ADISQ nomination in the category "Sound Engineer of the Year", rewarding Ben Lemelin's work, Foster's longtime creative partner. In 2022, he released the cover single "The Power of the Heart".

On April 26, 2024, Foster released a record titled Kimiyo, written and produced alongside his longtime creative partner Ben Lemelin and Japanese-Canadian artist Momoka Tobari. The album debuted at No. 12 on the Billboard Canadian Albums chart. On September 20, 2024, Foster released the instrumental album A Measure of Shape and Sounds, also co-written and co-produced with Lemelin. Both Kimiyo and A Measure of Shape and Sounds received nominations at the 47th ADISQ Gala, including “Album of the Year – Bilingual and Other Languages” for Kimiyo and two nominations for A Measure of Shape and Sounds in the categories “Album of the Year – Popular Success” and “Album of the Year – Instrumental”.

On May 16, 2025, Foster released A Nightfall Ritual, a live album made of 4 songs recorded live at Die Kantine in Cologne on July 27, 2024, during his tour Ascending Through Bright Lights, which marked his return on stage after a cardiac surgery. The release was accompanied by an international tour throughout 2025, including performances across Europe and appearances at several festivals, while the album received coverage in international music press and continued Foster’s presence on independent and alternative music charts.

In 2026, Foster was part of the lineup for the 10th-anniversary edition of the progressive rock festival cruise Cruise to the Edge, which took place from March 4 to March 9 aboard the Norwegian Pearl sailing from Miami with stops in Key West and Nassau. The event featured performances by artists including Marillion, Steve Hackett, Big Big Train, Eddie Jobson, Queensrÿche, and Adrian Belew, among others.

On May 15, 2026, the EP From the City to the Ocean was released, featuring 3 recent version of the song of the same name, originally released under Your Favorite Enemies on the album Between Illness and Migration. A month later, on June 17, Alex Henry Foster released the song Springtime, first single from his upcoming album The Fragile Beauty (Of New Morning Hopes), to be released on October 23 under Hopeful Tragedy Records. This will be Foster's first studio album since his debut album Windows in the Sky. On September 2, Calling Out!, the second single, was released.

== Career ==
Foster was born in Montreal, Canada and moved around Montreal and its suburbs during his childhood. After graduating from l'Université de Montréal as a social worker, he met Sef Lemelin with whom, along with Ben Lemelin and Miss Isabel, he started a band called The Riddlers, which became Your Favorite Enemies after Jeff Beaulieu and Charles "Moose" Allicie officially joined.

Foster co-founded the record label Hopeful Tragedy Records which set their studios and headquarters in a former Catholic church in Drummondville, Quebec in 2009. The facilities host music and multimedia studios, as well as The Fabrik, a creative group with spaces and equipments to screen-print, craft merchandising and press & cut vinyls on site.

Following the loss of his father, Foster decided to leave for Tangier, Morocco in 2016, where he spent two years working on what has become his debut album Windows in the Sky, launching his solo career. His entire band joined him to work on new musical projects, setting a professional music studio in the heart of Tangier. He released Windows in the Sky on November 9, 2018, which was premiered in Tokyo, Japan, prior to its release.

In 2017, Foster released the book A Journey Beyond Ourselves, revisiting the story behind the making of Your Favorite Enemies' album "Tokyo Sessions".

In 2018, Alex Henry Foster released his first solo album Windows in the Sky in Canada. It reached and remained at the top of the charts for multiple weeks after its release. In July 2019, he performed live for the first time as a solo act at the Festival International de Jazz de Montréal, and his album Windows in the Sky was nominated for "Anglophone Album of the Year" at ADISQ in the fall of the same year.

In 2020, Alex Henry Foster and his band members "The Long Shadows" toured across Europe with ...And You Will Know Us by the Trail of Dead, to critical acclaim.

In January 2020, he released an EP and lyric video for the song "Summertime Departures", followed by the release of a videoclip featuring his live performance at his first ever concert at the Festival International de Jazz de Montréal in front of a sold out venue. In March 2020, he released the EP for the song "The Hunter (By the Seaside Window)" as well as a short film for the 15-minute song made in collaboration with French producer and friend Jessie Nottola, who also worked with Tinariwen, Tiken Jah Fakoly, Arthur H. This short film, in the likes of David Lynch, was filmed near Montreal, Canada and got more than 150,000 views on YouTube a few days after its release.

On May 1, 2020, his album Windows in the Sky was released worldwide through a live concert from his studio-church broadcast on the online portal of the British Prog. It was preceded by the broadcast of a live rehearsal of Alex Henry Foster's band via ADISQ's portal, which had nominated his album in the category "Album of the Year - Anglophone" in 2019.

On June 9, 2020, Alex and his bandmates broadcast a live performance of the song "Lavender Sky" from their studio-church, and cut it on vinyl, turning it into their first direct-to-vinyl creation, crafted in-house, in their own creative atelier.

On June 26, 2020, Alex Henry Foster released a music video for the 4th single from his solo record Windows in the Sky, which was filmed in Iceland. The clip for the song "Lavender Sky" was premiered and acclaimed by BrooklynVegan:

The video itself is no less cinematic, having been gorgeously filmed in Iceland and featuring high floating landscape shots that are peppered with grainy (stretched) super 8mm film shots and bit of handheld shaky cam moments. The photography is pristine, and like the music goes from feeling grounded on earth to soaring high above our heads.

The British magazine NME qualified it as: "a cinematic new video and a dreamy blast of post-rock all about 'the acceptance of things we don't know and can't control'".

On August 7, 2020, Alex Henry Foster released the EP Snowflakes in July marking the end of the Windows in the Sky series. The EP consists of three versions of the song, one that was performed live from his studio-church and broadcast on BrooklynVegan on July 26, 2020. The live performance of the song was also turned into a direct-to-vinyl crafted in Foster's independent record label's facilities.

On March 27, 2024, Foster announced the soundtrack project Kimiyo, released on April 26, 2024. On the same day, the single "A Silent Stream" was made available. This project includes the collaboration of the Japanese-Canadian artist Momoka Tobari and Ben Lemelin, Foster's longtime music collaborator and bandmate in Your Favorite Enemies and The Long Shadows. Kimiyo is part of a project called "Voyage à La Mer", inspired by a trip that Foster made to Japan in 2010 and is composed of nine tracks on which Momoka Tobari sings and recites spoken word in Japanese.

== Windows in the Sky ==
Windows in the Sky is Alex Henry Foster's first solo record. Written in a time of isolation in Tangier, Morocco in 2016. What was supposed to be a three-week residency to write the new album of his former band Your Favorite Enemies turned into a two-year journey during which the album was written. It explores grief and hope through despair as Foster wrote it following the death of his father to cancer. It was released in Canada 2018 through his independent record label, Hopeful Tragedy Records and reached the top charts upon release, remaining in the Top 40 Billboard Canadian Albums Chart for a full year after its release. It was nominated in 2019 for Anglophone album of the year by L'ADISQ and was released internationally in May 2020.

== Standing Under Bright Lights ==
Standing Under Bright Lights is Foster's first live album, released internationally on April 16, 2021 through Hopeful Tragedy Records. This album features the entirety of Foster's first concert at the Festival International de Jazz de Montréal held on July 5, 2019. It includes the live rendition of every song from his album Windows in the Sky, performed by an 11-piece band.

This live moment took place approximately 6 months after the release of Foster's first solo album Windows in the Sky, that debuted at number 3 on the Canadian top 200, stayed on the top 40 for a year after its initial release, and got nominated for "Best album of the year" in Canada by l'ADISQ.

The concert was to be a one-off happening as an homage to Foster's late father, who had passed 5 years prior to cancer. The concert took place in a sold-out venue as part of the 40th Festival International de Jazz de Montréal and consisted of the performance of the entire album Windows in the Sky, by an 11-piece band and was accompanied by a movie projection produced by Foster.

Originally set to be released on October 8, 2020, his late father's birthday, Foster took time to produce the album Standing Under Bright Lights featuring the never-released song "The Son of Hannah", during the 2020-2021 pandemic.

Alex Henry Foster's performance was highlighted amongst 5 performances not to miss at the Festival International de Jazz by Radio-Canada. This 2h30 concert is considered amongst the best concerts ever performed at the Festival International de Jazz. Le Devoir gave a 4.5/5 stars review to the live album Standing Under Bright Lights upon release day.

In September 2021, Standing Under Bright Lights granted a ADISQ nomination in the category "Sound Engineer of the Year".

=== Weekly charts ===
One week after its release, Standing Under Bright Lights made its Australian charts debut at No. 6 in the ARIA Top 50 Albums for the week of April 23, 2021.

In the UK, it reached No. 4 in the "Top 20" of the Official Independent Album Breakers Chart, No. 13 in the "Top 50" of the Official Independent Albums Chart, and No. 32 in the Top 100 "Official Albums Sales Chart" in the week of April 23, 2021 to April 29, 2021.

On the week of May 1, 2021, Standing Under Bright Lights entered the Billboard charts at No. 4 of the Canadian Albums chart, No. 6 of the Australian albums chart, No. 18 of the Emerging Artists chart, No. 31 of the Current Albums Sales chart and No. 55 of the Album Sales chart.

In the week of April 30, 2021 to May 6, 2021, Standing Under Bright Lights made its Irish charts debut at No. 17 in the "Top 50" of the Official Irish Albums Chart, and was the most downloaded album of the week.

Chart (2021)	Peak position
Canadian Albums (Billboard)	4
Australian Albums (ARIA)	6
UK Independent Albums (Official Charts)	13
UK Albums (Official Charts)	32
Irish Albums Chart (Top 50)	17
Billboard Emerging Artists	18
Billboard Current Album Sales	31
Billboard Album Sales	55

== Kimiyo ==
On April 26, 2024, Alex Henry Foster released a new album, Kimiyo. This album was written during Foster's heart surgery recovery, alongside longtime music partner Ben Lemelin and Japanese-Canadian artist Momoka.

Kimiyo contains nine tracks, including spoken word and poetry in Japanese, sang by Momoka Tobari. With Foster being unable to sing, due to intubation and medical attention during his surgery, Foster, Lemelin and Tobari collectively worked on Kimiyo, an album inspired by Foster's 2010 trip and encounters in Japan.

The album is part of a four-part project called Voyage à la Mer, also including the album A Measure of Space and Sounds, the movie Voyage à La Mer, and a series of in-public conversations and live music called Of Flashes and Other Currents.

On September 17, 2025, ADISQ nominated Kimiyo in the category "Album of the Year - Bilingual & Foreign Languages".

== A Measure of Shape and Sounds ==
On September 20, 2024, Alex Henry Foster released A Measure of Shape and Sounds, his second album of the year. Entirely instrumental, the album has been co-written with Ben Lemelin, just like his previous release.

With ten tracks, Foster says the album was an introspective voyage recorded while he was unable to speak after his heart surgery. It has been considered a more "abstract" album than the albums previously released and found a place in Billboard's New Age Albums Charts.

The album is part of a four-part project called Voyage à la Mer, also including the album Kimiyo released earlier the same year, the movie Voyage à La Mer, and a series of in-public conversations and live music called Of Flashes and Other Currents.

On September 17, 2025, ADISQ nominated A Measure of Shape and Sounds in 2 categories, "Album of the Year - Popular Success" and "Album of the Year - Instrumental Music".

== A Nightfall Ritual ==
Released on May 16, 2025, the album A Nightfall Ritual , is a live recording captured during the final stop of the "Ascending Through Bright Lights" tour. It signifies Alex Henry Foster’s return to performance after critical heart surgery involving a double graft earlier in 2022. The album conceptualizes "every moment with which we define the nature of our faith and hopelessness in the colors of mornings to come".

The album reached #31 on Billboard’s Canadian Albums Chart upon release and also received early critical support from major outlets and national radio; single “The Son of Hannah” was Alan Cross’s “Undiscovered Gem of the Week”.

== Influences ==
Foster cites Fugazi, Sonic Youth, Pixies, My Bloody Valentine (band) and Mars Volta, Radiohead, Mogwai, Swans (band) and Nick Cave as recent influences and Sex Pistols, The Clash, The Ramones, Ministry (band), Skinny Puppy and The Cure as some of his early musical influences.

Poets and writers such as Leo Tolstoy, Khalil Gibran, Isaac Bashevis Singer, Baudelaire, Rainer Maria Rilke, Octavio Paz, Jack Kerouac, Paul Bowles, Ernest Hemingway, and Allen Ginsberg are also part of his influences and inspirations. Excerpts of the poem "Song" by Allen Ginsberg are featured on the track "Shadows of Our Evening Tides" on Alex Henry Foster's first solo album Windows in the Sky.

== Activism ==
Alex Henry Foster is also a former social worker and active human rights advocate. He has been spokesperson for Amnesty International and collaborated in campaigns for several years. He founded "Rock N Rights" in 2005, a non-profit spreading human rights awareness. He also appeared on the Canadian talk show Tout le monde en parle and CBC Radio show "Medium Large" to talk about his past in gangs and his views on social justice.

== Social involvement ==
Foster has been involved with Amnesty International for several years. He acts as an official spokesperson, a conference speaker in Canada and has hosted the Annual Youth Congress of Amnesty International, and has written a song for the release of Fred M'membe. His band Your Favorite Enemies participated to Amnesty International's 30th anniversary (2007), to the 35th anniversary of Give Peace A Chance, to Imagine (2004), Marche des femmes vers l'an 2000, and performed at the concert on behalf of the 51st anniversary of the Charter of Human Rights and Freedoms. Your Favorite Enemies also did an exclusive interview about human rights with the American band Anti-Flag during the Vans Warped Tour (2007).

In 2005, he co-founded "Rock N Rights", a non-profit organization focusing on human rights' promotion and education.

Following the tsunami in Japan in 2011, Foster and his bandmates from Your Favorite Enemies launched "The Hope Project" in partnership with the Red Cross and schools. This campaign consisted in gathering messages of support, empathy, and encouragement, and deliver them to survivors as personal postcards.

Rock N Rights took part in campaigns to support Saudi blogger Raif Badawi and freedom of speech as well as women's rights in collaboration with 100% Mamans in Tangier, Morocco.

In June 2020, Alex Henry Foster launched a campaigned called "Silence Is Murder", in the face of the racial and social injustices and violence outbreaks happening around the world. He crafted a t-shirt, for which all the profits were given to Amnesty International.

In September 2020, following the loss of a friend in France to suicide, Foster launched the campaign and masks collection "Alive. Never Alone." to raise awareness about suicide and mental health issues. As part of the initiative, he created a masks collection for which profits were given to the Montreal organisation Suicide Action Montréal.

== Discography ==
Studio albums

- Windows in the Sky (Hopeful Tragedy, 2018)
- Kimiyo (Hopeful Tragedy, 2024)
- A Measure of Shape and Sounds (Hopeful Tragedy, 2024)

Live albums

- Standing Under Bright Lights (Hopeful Tragedy, 2021)
- A Nightfall Ritual (Hopeful Tragedy, 2025)

EPs

- Summertime Departures (Hopeful Tragedy, 2020)
- The Hunter (By the Seaside Window) (Hopeful Tragedy, 2020)
- Lavender Sky (Hopeful Tragedy, 2020)
- Snowflakes in July (Hopeful Tragedy, 2020)
- A Whispering Moment (Hopeful Tragedy, 2024)

== Awards and nominations ==
=== ADISQ ===
Year	Nominee / work	Award	Result
2019	Windows in the Sky	Anglophone Album of the Year	Nominated
2021	Standing Under Bright Lights	Sound Engineer of the Year	Nominated
2025	Kimiyo	Album of the Year - Bilingual and Other Languages	Nominated
2025	A Measure of Shape and Sounds	Album of the Year - Popular Success	Nominated
2025	A Measure of Shape and Sounds	Album of the Year - Instrumental Music	Nominated
2025	A Nightfall Ritual	GAMIQ - Post-punk album of the Year	Nominated
