= A Measure of Shape and Sounds =

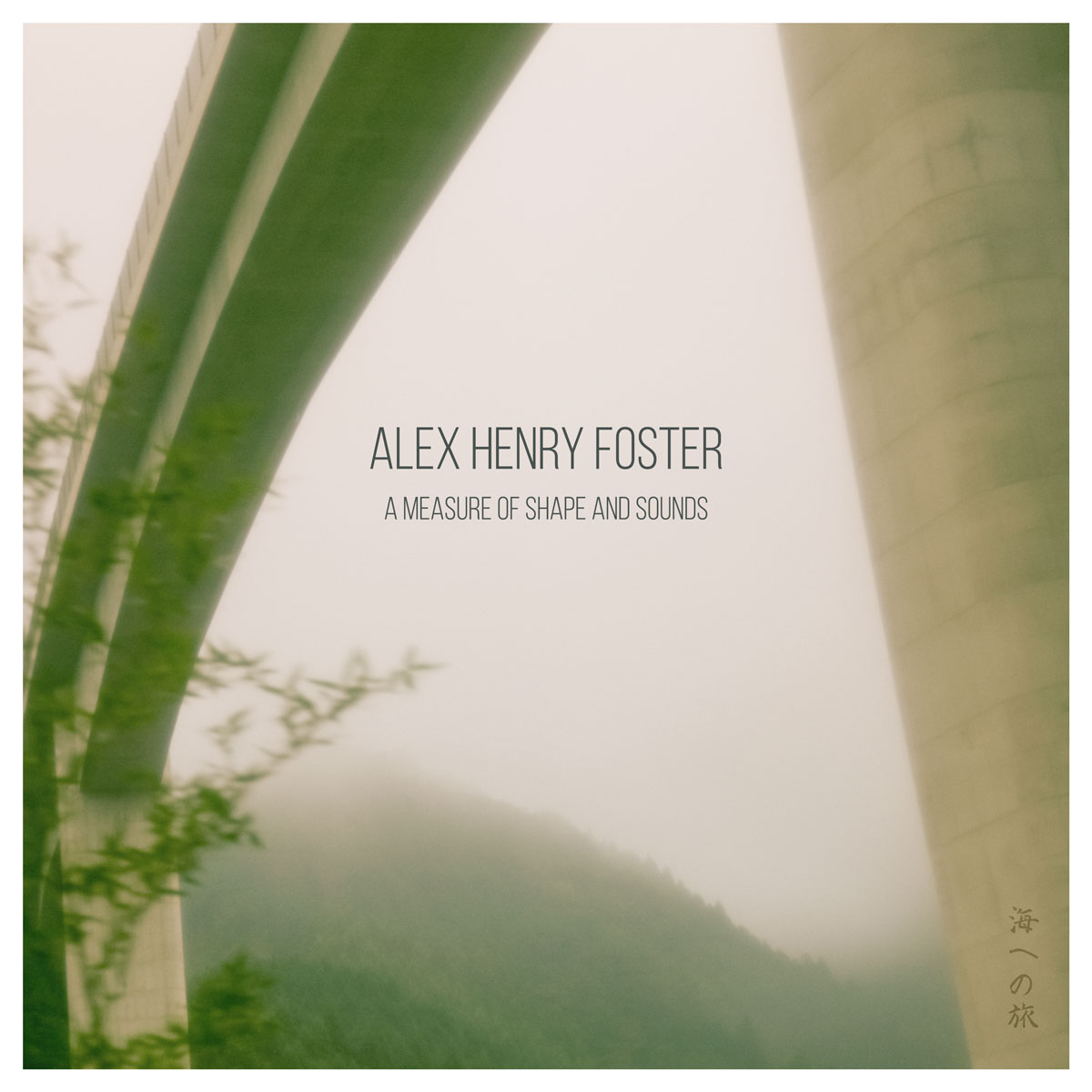

Studio album by Alex Henry Foster
- Released: September 20, 2024
- Recorded: 2023–2024
- Genre: Ambient · Experimental · Instrumental
- Length: 43:24
- Label: Hopeful Tragedy Records
- Producer: Alex Henry Foster · Ben Lemelin

Alex Henry Foster chronology
Kimiyo (2024)	A Measure of Shape and Sounds (2024)	A Nightfall Ritual (2025)

A Measure of Shape and Sounds is the third studio album by Canadian musician Alex Henry Foster. It was released on September 20, 2024, through Hopeful Tragedy Records. It was originally intended as a companion to Foster's previous release, Kimiyo, under the larger umbrella project Voyage à la Mer.

== Background ==
The album was created during Foster's recovery from a double cardiac graft surgery in 2023. Collaborating with longtime partner Ben Lemelin, Foster turned to instrumental soundscapes when he was unable to use his voice.

== Musical style ==
Critics have described the album as ambient and experimental, relying on loops, reverb, and minimalist arrangements to convey emotion without lyrics.

== Track listing ==
All tracks written by Alex Henry Foster and Ben Lemelin.

A Measure of Shape and Sounds track listing
No.	Title	Length
1.	"Thoughtful Descent"	2:47
2.	"Mechanical Revision"	3:43
3.	"A Mind’s Tapestry"	5:08
4.	"Cinematic Insight"	4:57
5.	"Self-Portrait"	2:29
6.	"Sorrowful Bouquet"	6:42
7.	"Manic View"	2:35
8.	"A Gesture, A Present"	7:49
9.	"Alchemical Connection"	2:34
10.	"Reflective Ascent"	4:30

== Reception ==
Three Songs & Out described the album as an introspective and ambient journey, noting its live recording approach and the natural flow of the compositions. During an interview with New Noise Magazine Foster emphasized that point, describing the album as "an introspective record, a sonic landscape inviting us to reflect and muse, but mainly to find inner solace, peace even." Psychedelic Baby Magazine premiered the track "Cinematic Insight" and discussed the album's creation process, noting that the album represents an intimate. Jesus Freak Hideout reviewed the album, describing it as "a piece of abstract art" that delves into themes of personal growth and emotional release.

Billboard Canada reported that Alex Henry Foster's album debuted at No. 41 on the Canadian Albums chart, following a No. 12 debut for his previous album, Kimiyo.

== Accolades ==
On September 17, 2025, A Measure of Shape and Sounds was nominated at the 47ᵉ Gala de l’ADISQ in two categories: Album de l’année – Succès populaire and Album de l’année – Musique instrumentale.

=== ADISQ ===
Year	Nominee / work	Award	Result
2025	A Measure of Shape and Sounds	Album of the Year - Popular Success	Nominated
2025	A Measure of Shape and Sounds	Album of the Year - Instrumental Music	Nominated

== Personnel ==
- Alex Henry Foster – instruments, composition, production
- Ben Lemelin – co-writer, instrumentation, production
