= Kimiyo =

Kimiyo is a Japanese feminine given name. Notable people with the name include:

- Kimiyo Hatanaka (born 1944), Japanese former tennis player
- Kimiyo Matsuzaki (born 1938), Japanese table tennis player
- Kimiyo Mishima (born 1932–2024), Japanese artist

== Other uses ==
- Kimiyo (album), 2024 studio album by Alex Henry Foster
- Doctor Light (Kimiyo Hoshi), comic book character from the DC Comics
