= And If I Was to Die in the Morning... Would I Still Be Sleeping with You =

And If I Was To Die in the Morning… Would I Still Be Sleeping With You
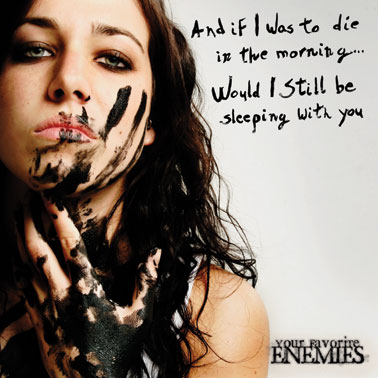

EP by Your Favorite Enemies
- Released: June 1, 2007
- Recorded: April to June 2007 in Quebec
- Genres: Alternative rock, emo
- Length: 20:32
- Label: Hopeful Tragedy Records
- Producer: Your Favorite Enemies

Your Favorite Enemies chronology
| And If I Was To Die in the Morning… Would I Still Be Sleeping With You (2007) | Love Is A Promise Whispering Goodbye (2008) |

And If I Was To Die in the Morning... Would I Still Be Sleeping With You is the first EP from the Canadian emo/alternative rock band, Your Favorite Enemies. For producing the album, the band founded their own label called Hopeful Tragedy Records in April 2007.

The EP was released on June 1, 2007, and includes five songs, including "Midnight's Crashing".

Sales reached nearly 40,000 units by February 29, 2008.

== Track listing ==
| No. | Title | Length |
|---|---|---|
| 1. | "Open Your Eyes" | 3:50 |
| 2. | "Midnight's Crashing" | 3:38 |
| 3. | "Little Sister" | 4:36 |
| 4. | "Hold Me Tight" | 3:55 |
| 5. | "Left Behind" | 4:13 |

== Personnel ==
- Alex Foster – vocals
- Miss Isabel – keyboard, backing vocals
- Jeff Beaulieu – guitar
- Sef Lemelin – guitar
- Ben Lemelin – bass guitar
- Charles "Moose" Allicy – drums
