= A Nightfall Ritual =

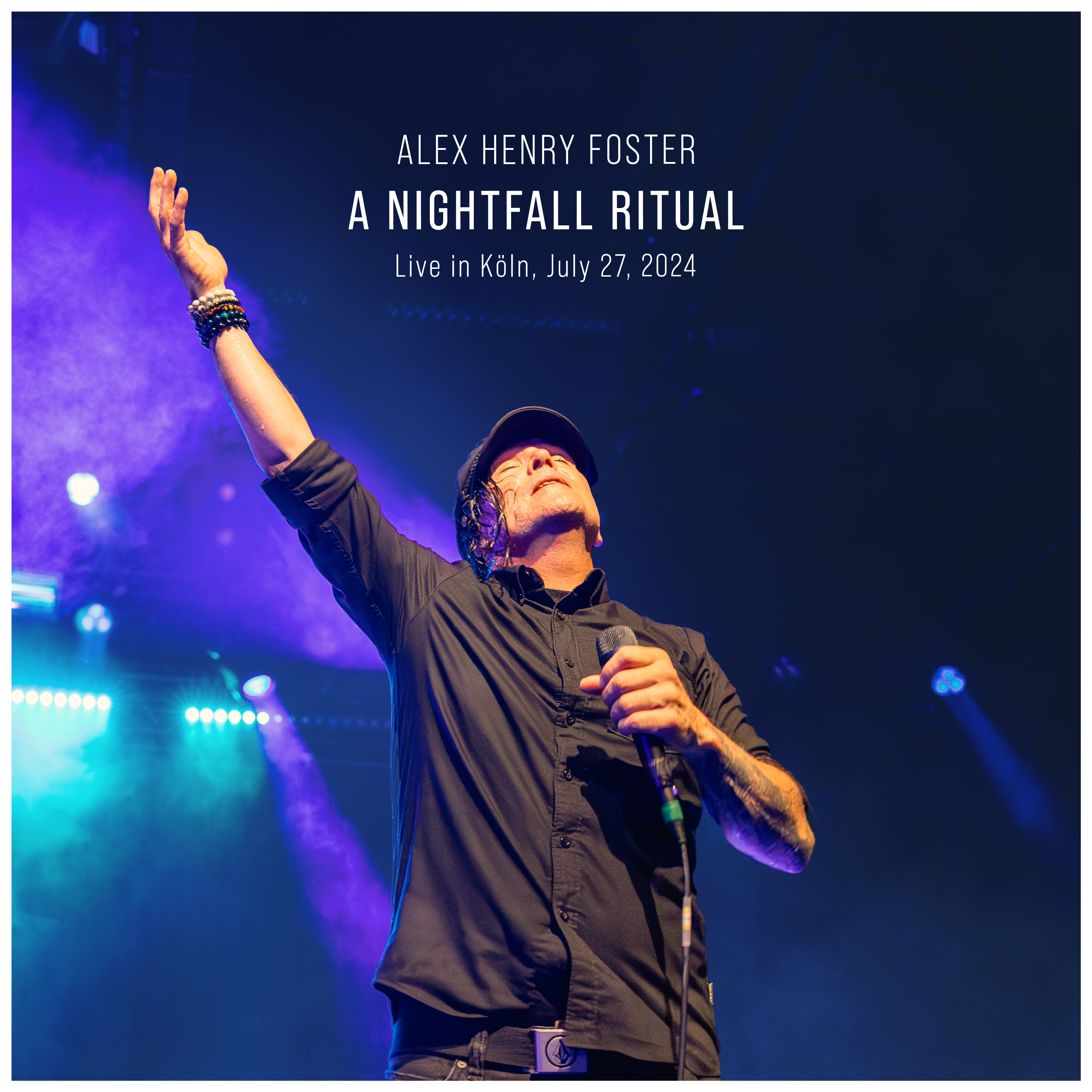

Live album by Alex Henry Foster
- Released: May 16, 2025
- Recorded: July 26–27, 2024
- Venues: Die Kantine, Cologne, Germany
- Genres: Ambient music, experimental music
- Length: 48:18
- Label: Hopeful Tragedy Records
- Producer: Alex Henry Foster

Alex Henry Foster chronology
A Measure of Shape and Sound (2024)	A Nightfall Ritual (2025)

A Nightfall Ritual is a live album by Canadian musician Alex Henry Foster, released on May 16, 2025, through Hopeful Tragedy Records. It documents the final stop of his "Ascending Through Bright Lights" tour at Die Kantine in Cologne, Germany, on July 27, 2024. The album includes four tracks and marks Foster's return to live performances after undergoing double bypass surgery in 2022.

== Background ==
Following his recovery from heart surgery, Foster embarked on the "Ascending Through Bright Lights" tour, culminating in the Cologne performance recorded for A Nightfall Ritual. The album's title reflects the introspective and spiritual themes explored during the concert. The tracks "Up Til Dawn" and "I'm Afraid" were both introduced as new compositions during this tour.

== Reception ==
Critics praised A Nightfall Ritual for its emotional depth and musical complexity. At The Barrier described the album as "a perfect title," noting that "an evening with the music of Alex Henry Foster (& The Long Shadows) is akin to a spiritual event." Le Devoir highlighted Foster's ability to merge introspective lyricism with expansive, cinematic soundscapes, calling the live recording "a profound and moving experience for the listener."

Billboard noted that Foster, previously the leader of the Juno-nominated band Your Favorite Enemies, has cultivated an international following. The publication highlighted his transition to a solo career with A Nightfall Ritual, emphasizing the album's live recording from a 2024 concert in Germany and its expansive musical arrangements.

The album reached No. 9 on the Billboard Canadian Albums chart upon release and received early critical support from major outlets and national radio. The single, "The Son of Hannah", was Alan Cross's "Undiscovered Gem of the Week".

== Track listing ==
No.	Title	Length
1.	"Up Til Dawn" (Live in Cologne, July 27, 2024; previously unreleased)	12:07
2.	"I'm Afraid" (Live in Cologne, July 27, 2024; previously unreleased)	10:13
3.	"The Son of Hannah" (Live in Cologne, July 27, 2024)	9:18
4.	"The Pain That Bonds" (Live in Cologne, July 26, 2024)	16:40
Total length:		48:18

== Chart performance ==
A Nightfall Ritual debuted at number 9 on the Billboard Canadian Albums chart for the week of May 31, 2025.

== Accolades ==
=== GAMIQ ===
Year	Nominee / work	Award	Result
2025	A Nightfall Ritual	Post-Punk/Post-Rock Album of the Year	Nominated

=== ADISQ ===
Year	Nominee / work	Award	Result
2026	A Nightfall Ritual	Album of the Year - Anglophone	Nominated

== Formats ==
The album was released in digital download, CD, Blu-ray, and vinyl formats. The vinyl edition features a gatefold design, and limited edition collector box sets were released with exclusive artwork.
