= Kimiyo (album) =

Studio album by Alex Henry Foster
- Released: April 26, 2024
- Recorded: 2023
- Studio: Highlands
- Length: 69:08
- Label: Hopeful Tragedy
- Producer: Ben Lemelin

Alex Henry Foster chronology
Windows in the Sky (2018)	Kimiyo (2024)

Kimiyo is an album by Alex Henry Foster and artist friend Momoka, released on April 26, 2024, through Hopeful Tragedy Records. It was produced by fellow Your Favorite Enemies and the Long Shadows bandmate Ben Lemelin, with whom Foster worked on the Juno-nominated album Between Illness and Migration and the ADISQ-nominated album Windows in the Sky.

Kimiyo contains nine songs, written by Foster while recovering from his open-heart surgery in February 2023. Kimiyo mixes spoken word in English and Japanese and atmospheric melodies. It is set to release on April 26, 2024.

It is one of four creative projects including two albums, Kimiyo and A Measure of Space and Sounds, the film Voyage à la Mer, and live conversations and musical improvisation "Of Flashes and Other Currents", all planned to be released in 2024.

This project is Foster's first release under artist management company In De Goot Entertainment, since establishing their partnership in 2023.

== Background ==
In February 2023, Alex Henry Foster underwent cardiac surgery, postponing his musical projects and tours with his band The Long Shadows. During this recovery period, he envisioned working on a project he had started in Japan in 2010.

His trip was prompted by a letter he had received from the parents of a fan, with whom he had gotten acquainted before he took his life. Foster went to meet with this young man's parents and traveled to Tokyo to further discuss grief, hope, sorrow, and dreams.

This meeting and 2010 trip to Japan also inspired creative endeavors that were postponed throughout the years, until this new album and cinematographic project “Voyage à La Mer”.

== Recording and composition ==
Unable to sing or speak, due to the surgery procedures he underwent, Foster invited his artist friend Momoka to sing and recite spoken word in Japanese to accompany the music. Ben Lemelin assisted Foster in the music composition and writing process of the album.

Foster said: "I have always been looking for a pretext or an excuse to work with Momoka... She's got a very unique spirit, and she’s a very inspiring and insightful person. We have a common view about life in general and spirituality in particular, but most of all, she is a fantastic artist for whom I have the utmost admiration."

The writing and recording of the album took place at the Highlands Studios, located in Foster's home in the mountains of Virginia. Lemelin and Momoka joined him there to work on the project.

== Singles ==
"A Silent Stream"

"A Silent Stream" is the album's debut single, released with the announcement on March 27, 2024, with an official lyric video. The Moroccan newspaper Le Matin described it as "an immersive experience, marked by reflection and contemplation".

This track is described on post-punk.com as "a contemplative journey within ourselves, designed for us to discover the purpose of days passing by, beyond the illusion of control over 'time' and the meanings we'd like to believe in".

"Nocturnal Candescence"

Released on April 10, 2024, "Nocturnal Candescence", is the second single from the album. Foster stated: "The song conveys the profound emotions of loss, hopelessness, and personal surrender in the context of self-abandonment." It is also related to the traditional Japanese songs of longing, aishoka (哀傷歌), about mourning, contemplation, and faith in better days.

"Under a Luxuriant Sky"

The third single "Under a Luxuriant Sky", also the closing track on the album, was released on April 26, 2024, the same day as the album.

"A Vessel Astray"

On June 4, 2024, Foster officially released a new music video for the song “A Vessel Astray” from the album Kimiyo, hinting at a movie to be released later in 2024 called “Voyage À La Mer”.

The video was premiered by Flood Magazine, on June 3rd 2024.

== Track listing ==
All tracks are written by Alex Henry Foster and co-written, recorded, and produced by Ben Lemelin.

Kimiyo track listing
No.	Title	Length
1.	"Of Dreams and Dust"	4:18
2.	"A Silent Stream"	8:18
3.	"The Edge of Time"	10:05
4.	"A Vessel Astray"	7:44
5.	"All of Our Past Future Lives"	4:41
6.	"Autumnal Processions"	7:34
7.	"Nocturnal Candescence"	9:47
8.	"Too Bright to Crumble"	8:05
9.	"Under a Luxuriant Sky"	8:09

== Charts ==
Chart performance for Kimiyo
Chart (2024)	Peak position
Canadian Albums (Billboard)	12

== Accolades ==
=== ADISQ ===
Year	Nominee / work	Award	Result
2025	Kimiyo	Album of the Year - Bilingual and Other Languages	Nominated
