= Kimiyo Mishima =

Japanese artist (1932–2024)

Kimiyo Mishima (1932 – June 19, 2024) was a Japanese contemporary artist, best known for creating highly realistic versions of "breakable printed matter" in ceramic such as newspapers, comic books and boxes out of clay. Mishima began her artistic career as a painter in the early 1960s, then started working in ceramics in 1971. At this time, she began to use the silk screen technique to print newspaper and ad poster images onto clay. Her use of manufactured objects shows parallels with the works of Claes Oldenburg and Andy Warhol, as well as postwar Japanese collectives Gutai and Dokuritsu Art Association.

== Early life ==
Mishima was born in 1932 in the Juso district, a downtown area of Osaka City. Her family owned a liquor store, so she grew up relatively well off.

Mishima took lessons in Nihon-Buyo, classical Japanese dance, but her teacher often scolded her for making up her choreography. She said she wanted to dance like Mercier Cunningham, the famous American modern dancer, "but my teacher would get angry. I realized that to dance, you need music and that if I wanted to do something alone, it could probably only be art."

As a child, Mishima was not one to play with dolls. Her father bought her several microscopes, and she often used them to look at her hair and insects. She would often crush bugs and put them under the microscope to observe.

In middle school, her homeroom teacher happened to be her art teacher and encouraged her to pursue art and draw things not taught in the art classroom. So her father bought her a set of painting materials, and she immersed herself in her painting from a young age.

After graduating high school, she had wanted to go to university to become a doctor, but her mother forced her into an early marriage in hopes that it would help her settle down. But she ran away to Tokyo from that marriage in about a year.

== Artistic influences and career ==
She eventually married Shigeji Mishima, who had followed her to Tokyo from Osaka. Shigeji was a family friend whose mother was the midwife of Mishima's mother. Mishima was encouraged to visit Shigeji from a young age because he was an artist. Mishima was reticent, but they eventually developed a reciprocating relationship through their art.

Shigeji was an artist who studied under Jiro Yoshihara, a painter deeply involved in the Gutai movement. Due to Shigeji's influence, Mishima's work shifted from figurative painting to abstraction.

Through Shigeji, Mishima interacted with other Japanese artists like Jiro Yoshihara, Takesada Matsutani, and Shuji Mukai. She was also old acquaintances with architect Tadao Ando and the dancer Toru Takemitsu. Although she was invited to join the Gutai group, she refused because she preferred to work alone and did not identify with the core Gutai artists from Osaka's well-off Ashiya area.

In the 1960s, she started making collages with newspapers, discarded waste papers from printing companies, and old movie posters. Mishima said that she didn't have much money at the time, so she turned her attention to these kinds of materials. She would use printed and other materials, such as a blanket that her husband's brother used as a soldier during World War II.

As the materials she used for her collages accumulated in her studio, she came upon the idea to make her iconic newspaper-shaped ceramics in the 1970s. At first, she had trouble making the clay thin enough to imitate the form of the newspaper. She got the idea to use a rolling pin when she saw an Udon-making demonstration. She had used silk screen techniques in her collages for years, which helped her develop a method to transfer the text of newspapers onto the ceramics. Mishima would choose articles or advertisements from various Japanese newspapers on topics that interested her. She often used cutouts from the New York Times or Playbills from Broadway shows that she went to during her time in New York, from 1986 to 1987, supported by a grant by the Rockefeller Grant. She was invited to join the Sodeisha ceramics movement, but she never considered herself a ceramicist, so she did not join.

She said, "I thought that if I changed the newspaper's paper into ceramics, it might express a sense of impending crisis or instability regarding 'information'." She said that she chose ceramics because of their brittle quality and newspapers because they symbolized the commodification of information. Her works seem to be a social commentary about the acceleration of consumption in the information age.

== Death ==
Mishima died on June 19, 2024, at the age of 91.

== Selected solo exhibitions ==
2018	Anne Mosseri-Marlio Galerie, Basel, CH
2017	Sokyo Gallery, Kyoto, JP
	MEM Gallery, Tokyo, JP
	Gallery Yamaki Fine Art, Kobe, JP
2016	Taka Ishii Gallery, New York, USA
2014	Art Factory, Jonanjima, Tokyo, JP
2013	Gallery Yamaki Fine Arts, Kobe, JP
2004	Nii Gallery, Osaka, JP
	Contemporary Art Museum, Ise, Mie, JP
2001	Muramatsu Gallery, Tokyo, JP
1999	INAX Gallery, Tokyo, JP
1998	Art Front Gallery, Tokyo, JP
1992	Kasahara Gallery, Osaka, JP
1990	INAX Gallery, Tokyo, Osaka, JP
	Gallery Pusu, Tokyo, JP
1989	Muramatsu Gallery, Tokyo, JP
1988	Gallery 16, Kyoto, JP
1985	Gallery Ueda Warehouse, Tokyo, JP
1980	Claywork : From Traditional To Avangarde, Seibu Hall, Shiga, JP
1974	Minami Gallery, Tokyo, JP
1972	Muramatsu Gallery, Tokyo, JP
	Imai Gallery, Osaka, JP
1971	Fujimi Gallery, Osaka, JP
1970	Gallery 16, Kyoto, JP
	Gallery Ano, Osaka, JP
1969	Imabashi Gallery, Osaka, JP
1968	Gallery 16, Kyoto, JP
1966	Gallery 16, Kyoto, JP
1964	Gallery 16, Kyoto, JP
	Gallery Ano, Osaka, JP

== Selected group exhibits ==
2018	The Superlative Artistry of Japan, Japan Foundation, Cologne, DE
2017	2D Printers, Tochigi Prefectural Museum of Fine Arts, Utsunomiya, JP
	Painting on the Edge: A historical survey, Gallery Stephan Friedman, London, UK
2016	CERAMIX, traveling exhibition at: Bonnefantenmuseum, Maastricht, NL; La Maison Rouge, Paris, FR; Cité de la Céramique-Sèvres, FR
2015	Ancient to Modern – Japanese Contemporary Ceramics and their Sources, San Antonio Museum of Art, TX, USA
	Conversations: A 25th Anniversary Exhibition, Harn Museum of Art, University of Florida, Gainesville, Florida, USA
2014	Currents: Japanese Contemporary Art, Christie's Hong Kong
	Abstractions in Blue: Works from The Wise Collection, Worcester Art Museum, Worcester, USA
2012	Breaking the Mold, The Salon: Art and Design Fair with Joan B Mirviss LTD., New York, NY
2011	Ceramica Viva: I Ceramisti Giapponesi Premiati a Faenza [Japanese awardees of International Faenza Ceramic Festival, Istituto Italiano di Cultura, Tokyo, JP
2010	This is not a book: Spreading of Book Art, Urawa Art Museum, Saitama and Fukui City Art Museum, Fukui, JP
	The Magic of Ceramics: Artistic Inspiration, Shigaraki Ceramic Cultural Park, Shiga Newspapers, Kanda Nissho Memorial Museum of Art, Shikaoi, Hokkaido, JP
2009	Vingt-cinq ceramists Japonaises contemporaines, Le Musée National de Céramique, Sèvres, FR
	Breaking from Tradition Japanese Ceramics Today, Harvey/Meadows Gallery, Aspen CO with Joan B Mirviss, LTD., New York, USA
	Touch Fire: Contemporary Japanese Ceramics by Women Artists, Smith College Museum of Art, Northampton, MA, USA
	World of Trick Art, Toyohashi City Museum of Art and History, Aichi and Takamatsu City Museum of Art, Kagawa, JP
2008	Osaka Art Kaleidoscope 2008, Contemporary Art Center, Osaka, JP
2007	Breaking the Mold/ kata o yaburu. Joan B Mirviss, LTD. New York, USA
	Various Aspects of the Avant-garde Ceramic Art, Museum of Modern Ceramic Art, Gifu, JP
	Hermandades Escultóricas México-Japón 2007, Museo MACAY, Mérida, Yucatán, MX
	Depicting Words in Art- Masterpieces from the Permanent Collection, Municipal Museum of Art Kyoto, JP
2007-12	Soaring Voices – Contemporary Japanese Women Ceramic Artists, The Shigaraki Ceramic Cultural Park, Shiga. Exhibition traveled to New Otani Art Museum, Tokyo, Japan; Le Musée National Céramique à Sèvres, Sèvres, France; Crocker Art Museum, Sacramento, CA; The Katzen Arts Center at American University, Washington, DC; The Crow Collection of Asian Art, Dallas, TX; Morikami Museum and Japanese Gardens, Delray Beach, FL; The Samuel P. Harn Museum of Art, University of Florida, Gainesville; Arizona State University Art Museum, Tempe; Western Gallery at Western Washington University, Bellingham; City Arts Center, Oklahoma City, OK; Maui Arts and Cultural Center, Kahului, HI, USA
2006	The Quintessence of Modern Japanese Ceramics, Ibaraki Ceramic Art Museum.
	Contemporary Clay: Japanese Ceramics for the New Century, Japan Society, New York, USA
	Tōji: Avant-Garde et Tradition de la Cèramique Japonaise, Musèe national de cèramique Sèvres, FR
	Real—Reality in Ceramics, Museum of Modern Ceramic Art, Gifu, JP
2005	Outdoor Work setting at Benesse Art Site Naoshima, JP
	My Landscape, Ikeda Museum of 20th Century Art, JP
	Exhibition of Art Puzzle Puzzle, Art of Museum of The World Child Hamada City, JP
	Women Artists of Avant Garde 1950–1975, Tochigi Prefectural Museum of Art, JP
	Contemporary Ceramics of Japan, Boston Art Museum, Boston, USA
2004	Contemporary Codex; Ceramic and Book, University Art Gallery Central, JP
	Michigan University, Baltimore, MD; USA and some other states in the US.
2003	The Art of Earth-Clay Work of The New Century, The National of Art, Osaka, JP
2002	Japan Contemporary Ceramic 100 Year, The Gifu Prefectural Contemporary Ceramic Museum of Art, JP
	Imaging the Book, Exhibition of Contemporary Art, The Library of Alexandria Egypt.
	Metamorphosis Art Exhibition, The Museum of Modern Art, Gunma, JP.
	Humor Exhibition, Toki City The Lord Mayer of Aizu prize.
2001	The Contemporary Sculpture exhibition Japan, Ubeshi Yamaguchi Prefectural Museum, JP
2000	The International Ceramic Exhibition, Keramion, DE
1999	The Past War Period Art Kansai 1950's-1990's, The Wakayama Modern Art Museum, JP
	The Plate Show Round exhibition, Glasgow, UK
	Collection in Focus, What you see is what get on is it?, Museum of Contemporary Art, Tokyo, JP
1998	Itinerant International Exhibition, Japan-Brazil 98–99, Art Museum of São Paulo, Modern Museum of Rio de Janeiro, BR
	The Hope, Safa Gallery, Budapest, Hungarian Museum of Photography, Kecskemet, HU
1997	Asahi Contemporary Craft, The Asahi Newspaper, JP
	The Yamamura Collection, The Hyogo Prefectural Museum of Modern Art, JP
	50 years of Contemporary Art, Museum of contemporary Art, Tokyo, JP
1996	1996 Aspects of Japanese Ceramic Art, The Hakone Open-Art Museum, JP
	Sai no Kuni Chokoku Variety 1996, grand prize, Saitama Prefecture, JP
	Cross Section of The Past War Period Art, The Museum of Art, Chiba City, JP
1995	Japanese Culture: the Fifty Past War Years 1945–1995, Asahi News Paper, JP
	International Contemporary Ceramic, Shigaraki Ceramic Cultural Center, JP
	Magical Viewpoint, Hirakata City Gotenyama Art Center, JP
	Wind of Faenza, Toki City, JP
1994	The 60th Anniversary Memorial Exhibitions, Kyoto Municipal Museum Collection, The Metropolitan Museum of Art, Tokyo, JP
1993	Repetition and Multiplication in Contemporary Art from the Museum Collection, The Metropolitan Museum of Art, Tokyo, JP
	Industrial Art of the World, The National Museum of Modern Art, Kyoto, JP
	Contemporary Ceramic Exhibition, Aichi Prefectural Museum of Art, JP
	Vision Illusion and Anti-illusion from the Museum Collections, the Metropolitan Museum of Art, Tokyo, JP
	Contemporary Ceramic Exhibition, The Museum of Modern Art, Saitama, JP
1992	Asahi contemporary craft, invited by Asahi Newspaper, JP
	Contemporary Japanese Ceramic, The Everson Museum of Art, New York, USA.
	1992 International Ceramic Exhibition, National Museum of History, Taiwan.
1991	Art Scene 1991 –Each Material, Each Expression, The Tokushima Prefectural Museum of Modern Art, Tokushima, JP
	Kyoto Select Art Exhibition, Kyoto Municipal Museum of Art, JP
1990	Asahi Contemporary Crafts, The Asahi Newspaper. Japanese Clay Works Today, The Tochigi Prefectural Museum of Art, JP
	Aspects of Contemporary Clay Art, The Metropolitan Museum of Art, Tokyo, JP
	Contemporary Ceramic, The Wakayama Prefectural Modern Museum of Art, Tokyo, JP
1989	Exhibition of Collections, Tochigi Prefectural Museum of Art, JP
	Exhibition of Yamamura Collection, The Hyogo Prefectural Museum of Modern Art, Kobe, JP
	Development of Contemporary Art, The Metropolitan museum of Art, Tokyo, JP
	Art Exciting 1989-Beyond the Toda's being-, Saitama Prefectural Museum of Modern Art, Saitama, JP
	The Museum of Art Queensland, AU.
	Art of Kyoto, Yesterday, Today, Tomorrow, Kyoto Municipal Museum of Art, JP
1988	Exhibition of Art touchable, The Seibu Tokyo and Hyogo, JP
	East-West Contemporary Ceramic Exhibition, The Korean Culture and Arts Foundation, Korean.
	Biennale International Limoges, Limoges FR. Contemporary Ceramic Sculpture Exhibition 1988, Gold Prize,
	Gifu Toki City Culture Plaza, JP
1987	Clay Sculptures from the 1950s in Japan, The Museum of Art Gifu, Gifu, JP
	Obje-Deviate Obje, Seibu Tsukashin Hall, Hyogo, JP
1986	Claywork, Seibu Hall, Shiga and Tokyo.
	Ceramic Now, Seibu Gallery, Tokyo. Claywork 1986, Gallery Maronie, Kyoto.
	Reading Objects, Gallery Iteza, Kyoto, JP
	ESTIU Japon 1986, Olot, Spain. Contemporary Japanese Ceramics, The Museum of Art Syracuse, NY, USA
	Contemporary Ceramics, Budapest, HU.
1985	Yamamura Collections Exhibition, The National Museum of Art, Osaka, JP 10 Spiez Ceramics Exhibition, Spiez, CH.
	Osaka Contemporary Art Fair 1985, Osaka Contemporary Art Center. Book-self Sculpture, Gallery 16, Kyoto, JP
	Toward the Museum of tomorrow, Image as environment, Hyogo Prefectural Museum of Modern Art, Kobe, JP
	Print of Japan, Tochigi Prefectural Museum of Art, JP
1984	International Ceramics, Budapest, HU.
	Ceramics Today, Seibu Gallery, Tokyo, JP
1983	Contemporary Japanese Art, Musée d' Art et d' Historoire, Geneva, CH.
	Contemporary Realism, Saitama Prefectural Museum of Modern Art, JP
	International Impact Art, The Kyoto Municipal Museum of Art, The Seoul Contemporary Museum of Art, JP
1982	Clay Work Now 1, Yamaguchi Prefectural Museum of Art, JP
	Contemporary Japanese Ceramics, Italy, Canada and Hong Kong.
1981	Contemporary Japanese Ceramics, National Museum of History, Taipei, Taiwan.
	Art Now:1970-1980, Hyogo Prefectural Museum of Modern Art, Kobe, JP
1980	International Ceramics Biennial, Faenza Ceramics Museum, Faenza, IT
	International Ceramics Biennial, Vallauris, FR.
	Simulated Landscape in Contemporary Art, The National Museum of Art, Osaka, JP
	Print of Japan, Tochigi Prefectural Museum of Art, JP
	Gallery 16, Kyoto, and Sakura Gallery, Nagoya, JP
1979	Invited as a guest exhibitor to The British International Print Biennale, Bradford, UK
	Japan Today, Denver Art Museum, Denver, CO, USA.
	Contemporary Crafts, The Gunma Prefectural Museum of Modern Art, Takasaki, JP
	Shimizu Kusuo and his Artist, Minami Gallery, Tokyo, JP
1978	Women Japanese Artists, A.I.R. Gallery, New York, NY, USA
	Contemporary Japanese Crafts, the National Museum, of Modern Art, Kyoto, JP
	Contemporary Japanese Crafts, the National Museum, of Modern Art, Kyoto, JP
	Contemporary Craftsmen, The Kyoto Municipal Museum of Art, Kyoto, JP
1977	Contemporary Japanese Graphics Grand Prix Exhibition, Matsuya Department Store, Tokyo, JP
1976	The Fifth British International Print Biennale, Bradford, UK.
	Japanese Ceramics, Museum of Art, Dresden, DE
	Contemporary Ceramics, touring exhibition in Australia, New Zealand.
	Japan Art Festival, Ueno no Mori Museum, Tokyo, and University of Seattle, Seattle, WA, US
	International Print Biennale Cracow, PL
1975	Asahi Art Now, Hyogo Prefectural Museum of Modern Art, Kobe, JP
	Contemporary Japanese art
	Contemporary Japanese Graphic Art, The Museum of Modern Art, Ferrarea, IT.
	Contemporary Expression 1975, Daimaru Department Store, Kyoto, JP
1974	The Eleventh International Art Exhibition, Japan-Tokyo Biennale, Tokyo, JP
1973	International Ceramics, Calgary, Alberta, Canada. Chunichi International
1972-80	International Ceramic Exhibition, Faenza Ceramic Museum, Faenza, IT
1971-79	The Japan Ceramic Art exhibition, Daimaru department store, Tokyo, JP
	Touring in USA and Canada (1971,1973,1975,1977,1979), and touring in South America (1973).
1966	Mainichi Shinbun Art Concour Exhibition, Kyoto Municipal Museum of Art, JP
1965	The Ninth Annual Shell Exhibition, Shirokiya Department Store, Tokyo, JP
1964	Trends in Contemporary Japanese Painting and Sculpture, The National Museum of Modern Art, Kyoto, JP
	The Third International Young Artists Exhibition, Tokyo, JP.
1962	Asahi Young Artists Exhibition, Osaka, JP
1954-69	Dokuritsu Exhibition, Tokyo Metropolitan Museum of Art. winner of the Prize in 1961, winner of the Grand Prix in 1963,
	Tokyo Metropolitan Museum of Art, JP

== Permanent Installations, Museum and Public collections ==
The National Museum of Modern Art, Kyoto, JP

Kyoto Municipal Museum of Art, Kyoto, JP

The International Museum of Art, Osaka, JP

Benesse Art Site Naoshima, Naoshima, JP

Hara Museum of Art, Tokyo, JP

The Metropolitan Museum of Art, Tokyo, JP

Hokkaido Prefectural Museum of Modern Art, Sapporo, JP

The Museum of Art, Hakodate, JP

Iwaki City Museum of Modern Art, Fukushima, JP

Tochigi Prefectural Museum of Art, JP

Okegawa City Park, Saitama, JP

Matsumoto City Museum of Art, Matsumoto, JP

The Gifu Prefectural Contemporary Ceramic Museum of Art, Gifu, JP

The Wakayama Prefectural Modern Museum of Art, Wakayama, JP

The Shigaraki Ceramic Cultural Park, Shiga, JP

The Hyogo Prefectural Museum of Art, Kobe, JP

Ashiya City Museum of Art and History, Ashiya, Hyogo, JP

Takamatsu City Museum of Art, Takamatsu, Kagawa, JP

Yamaguchi Prefectural Museum of Art, Yamaguchi, JP

Hamada Children's Museum of Art, Hamada, Shimane, JP

Ikeda Museum of 20th Century Art, Ikeda, Shizuoka, JP

Contemporary Art Museum ISE, Mie, JP

Ohara Museum of Art, Okayama, JP

The Japan Foundation, Tokyo, JP

The Korean Culture & Arts Foundation Seoul, KR

Institute of Contemporary Art, Kunsan National University, KR

National Museum of History, TW

HAP POTTERY, Beijing, CN

M+ Museum, Hong Kong, HK

Art Institute of Chicago, Chicago, USA

Minneapolis Institute of Arts, Minneapolis, USA

The Everson Museum of Art, New York, USA

Samuel P. Harn Museum of Art, University of Florida, Gainesville Florida, USA

The First National Bank of Chicago, USA

Asian Cultural Council, New York, USA

SMITH COLLEGE, Northampton, USA

Worcester Art Museum, Worcester, USA

Museum of Fine Arts, St. Petersburg, Florida, USA

The Keramion Museum for Contemporary Ceramic Art, DE

The Museum of Faenza, IT

Japanese Culture Center, Roma, IT

Ariana Museum, Geneve, CH

Kunst Gesellschaft, Spiez, CH

The Museum of Art, Olot, ES

International Ceramics Studio, Kecskemét, HU

Musee Cernoschi, Paris, FR

Vehbi Koç Foundation, ARTER, Istanbul, TR

== Awards ==
1961	Winner of the prize at Dokuritsu Exhibition, Tokyo Metropolitan Museum, JP
1963	Winner of the Grand Prix, Tokyo Metropolitan Museum of Art, Tokyo, JP
1965	The Ninth Annual Shell Exhibition, winner of the Prize, Shirokiya Department Store, Tokyo, JP
1974	International Ceramic Exhibition, winner of the gold medal, Faenza, Ceramic Museum, Faenza, IT
1986-87	Rockefeller Fellowship, New York, USA
1988	Contemporary Ceramic Sculpture Exhibition 1988, Gold Prize, Gifu Toki City Culture Plaza, JP
1989	International Ceramics, winner of the Copper Prize, Tajimi Gymnasium, JP
1996	Sai no Kuni Chokoku Variety 1996, grand prize, Saitama Prefecture, JP
2001	The Contemporary Sculpture exhibition Japan, Yamaguchi Prefectural Prize and The Citizen Prize, JP
	Ubeshi Yamaguchi Prefectural Museum, JP
2002	Received Yaizu Mayor's prize at the show ‘Humor’, Shizuoka of Art, JP
