= Hopeful Tragedy Records =

Canadian record label

Hopeful Tragedy Records is a 2007 formed Quebec-based Record label founded by Your Favorite Enemies.

The label was founded for promoting their first EP called And If I Was To Die In The Morning… Would I Still Be Sleeping With You which was released on 1 June 2007. Since then, the label has signed many artists, most of them from the underground EDM scene in Montreal.

In 2010, the label turned a former Catholic church on the outskirts of Montreal into a professional recording studio. Now The Upper Studio Room, it operates as a small recording studio, merch factory, and vinyl plant.

The studio has been used to record many albums, including the Juno-nominated album Between Illness and Migration by Your Favourite Enemies, the top-charting Windows in the Sky by Alex Henry Foster. It has also been used as a broadcast studio and hosted the 2021 Canadian Music Week.

== Current Artists ==
- Alex Henry Foster
- Sef Lemelin
- Your Favorite Enemies
- L.O.E (Last of Eden)
- Koko et ses machines
- Raj Ramayya
- 10After10
- Cubby V
- Total Gipsy
- Leeman

== Former Artists ==
- Biosphere
- DJ B Redemption
- Carabine
- Leeman
- Pinkie
- Osaka Motel
- The Invisible Rainbow
- Salament
- DJ White
- Zörg
