= Your Favorite Enemies =

Canadian alternative rock band

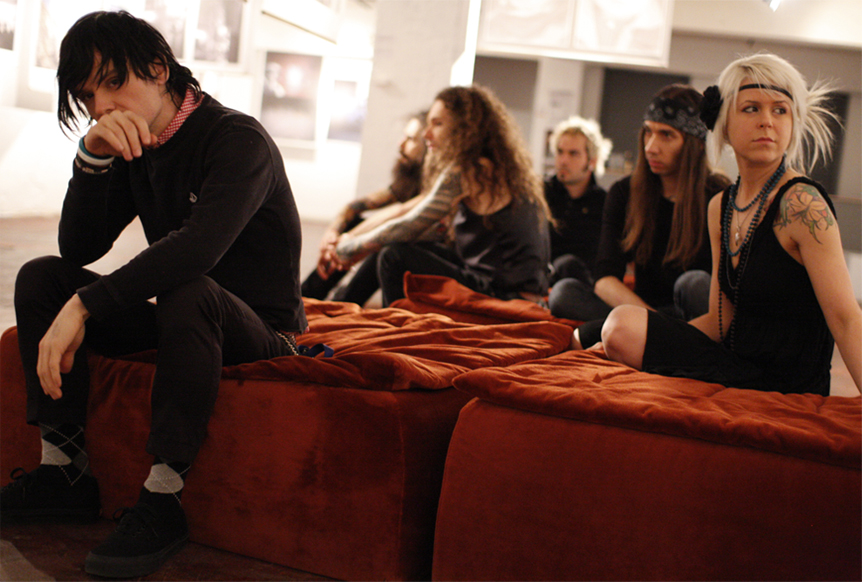
- From left to right: Alex Henry Foster, Sef, Ben Lemelin, Jeff Beaulieu, Charles (Moose) Allicie, Miss Isabel

Background information
- Origin: Drummondville, Quebec, Canada
- Genres: Alternative rock, Shoegaze, Post-rock, Noise rock
- Years active: 2006–present
- Label: Hopeful Tragedy Sony Music The Orchard
- Members: Alex Henry Foster; Jeff Beaulieu; Sef Lemelin; Ben Lemelin; Miss Isabel; Charles "Moose" Allicie
- Website: www.yourfavoriteenemies.com

Your Favorite Enemies is a Canadian alternative rock band that was formed in Varennes, Quebec, in 2006 by Alex Henry Foster (vocals), Jeff Beaulieu (guitar), Sef Lemelin (guitar), Ben Lemelin (bass), Miss Isabel (vocals and keyboard), and Charles "Moose" Allicie (drums). The band is now based in Drummondville, in a former Catholic church that they have transformed into a studio. The members of the band have remained the same since the beginning.

The band members have been influenced by bands such as The Clash, The Ramones, The Cure, Noir Désir, and Nick Cave and the Bad Seeds, and has a sound that ranges from alternative rock, to shoegaze, post rock, and noise rock.

The band has toured and played in Europe (France, Germany, Belgium, Netherlands, Switzerland, United Kingdom), Japan, Australia, China, Taiwan, Canada and the United States.

== History ==
=== Formation, first EP and first European tour (2006–2007) ===
In 2007, the band's members founded their own record label, Hopeful Tragedy Records, and produced the EP And If I Was To Die In the Morning… Would I Still Be Sleeping With You. Available in June of that year, the EP sold more than 30,000 units by February 29, 2008. They went on a European tour, playing in London, Paris, Berlin, and Cologne.

=== Love Is a Promise Whispering Goodbye, Final Fantasy and YFE-TV (2008) ===
2008 began with Your Favorite Enemies being mentioned as "one of the top 5 Canadian acts burning their way to International stardom" by Billboard magazine. On June 1, 2008, the band released their second album, Love Is A Promise Whispering Goodbye, which sold over 60,000 copies. (In June 2011, the band released a deluxe and remastered version of Love Is A Promise Whispering Goodbye, with unreleased tracks, live versions, and exclusive videos, accompanied by 10 video interviews, answering questions about the album.)

The band then embarked on their first Japanese tour alongside Simple Plan, where they played in Tokyo, Osaka, and Nagoya. That tour attracted the attention of video game composer Takeharu Ishimoto who asked the band to arrange, write lyrics for, and perform three songs on the soundtrack for Dissidia: Final Fantasy, including the theme song. The game's soundtrack reached the 50 best-sellers chart on iTunes in Japan. Also that year, the band added a multi-media section to Hopeful Tragedy Records, YFE-TV (not to be confused with the German broadcaster of the same name).

=== Studio acquisition and Bla Bla Bla: The Live Show (2009–2010) ===
In 2009, Your Favorite Enemies acquired a former Catholic church in Drummondville and turned it into a professional recording studio. It also houses facilities for live streaming and TV production, the offices of their label, and the offices of their non-profit organization.

From December 2, 2008, to April 18, 2010, the band offered a free weekly podcast, with portraits of the musicians, behind-the-scenes content, concert clips, studio sessions and interviews, and coverage of their work as human rights advocates. On December 10, 2010, the band launched their own talk show, Bla Bla Bla: The Live Show. The show covered news from the band, and information about their lifestyle, upcoming releases, tours, and merchandise releases. As of the 4th edition, on June 26, 2011, the show was broadcast live in English and in French on the same day, and made available with Japanese subtitles. The last episode of Bla Bla Bla: The Live Show, Episode 29, aired on September 27, 2015; the band announced that it would be moved to Facebook.

=== The Hope Project & Touring China (2011) ===
On March 11, 2011, the Northeast coast of Japan was hit by one of the most destructive earthquakes and tsunamis in the country's history. Your Favorite Enemies responded by launching The Hope Project. The band invited everyone to send messages of support, empathy, and encouragement, to be delivered to survivors as personal postcards, in partnership with the Red Cross and numerous schools worldwide. The project received hundreds of messages in several languages. International media such as Billboard and USA Today supported the initiative by sharing the concept with readers and online viewers. On May 25, 2011, the band visited a shelter for survivors in Minami Sanriku, and played a benefit tour in Japan. Titled Arisen From Despairs, A Morning Of All Hope, the tour brought the band in Tokyo, Osaka, and Kyoto. While in Kyoto, Your Favorite Enemies became the first international band to play at the historic Otagi Nenbutsu-ji. This experience became the object of a DVD released in January 2012, Running Through The Rain of Estrangement... Catching Pure Drops of Diamond Bliss.

In April and May 2011, Your Favorite Enemies traveled across China on a tour called The Rising Youth Of The Dragon Land, playing the MIDI and ZEBRA festivals, as well as performing in clubs and venues in different cities. Known for their active support for such organizations as AIDS charity (RED) and for being long-time spokespersons for Amnesty International, the band was said to be "one of the most controversial band to ever play in China". On May 18, 2011, the band was "Artist of the Week" in Billboard magazine.

=== Vague Souvenir and Sacred Kind of Whispers (2012–2013) ===
On July 31, 2012, Your Favorite Enemies released an acoustic album called Vague Souvenir. The first released single, "Turn The Dirt Over", is a cover of a song by Sea Wolf. The album contains 14 tracks that include poetry, spoken-word, songs from the early years of the band, and covers from artists that have inspired the band. The album was explained in details in a series of blogs called From A Spark To A Song. This album also gave birth to Sacred Kind of Whispers, an album released on June 7, 2013. It was released only on vinyl, and contains four original songs of the band, three of which are on Vague Souvenir, and five spoken-words poems in French, one of which is exclusive to the vinyl album.

=== Between Illness and Migration (2013–2017) ===
Your Favorite Enemies finished the recording of their album Between Illness and Migration in early January. It was mixed by John Agnello (Sonic Youth, The Kills, Bob Dylan) at Fluxivity Studio in New York City. The band released the album on March 20, 2013, in Japan, through King Records. The band was placed among 'featured artists' for weeks by Tower Records. In April, they performed at Canadian Music Week, then went overseas to play in Paris and London.

On July 8, 2013, Your Favorite Enemies released the EP Youthful Dreams of an Old Empire exclusively in the UK. The 3-track EP, a Prequel to Between Illness And Migration, was well received by critics.

On September 6, 2013, the band released the Australian version of Between Illness And Migration. The album received 4 out of 5 stars by The Sydney Morning Herald. In support of the release of the album, Your Favorite Enemies toured Australia and played at Brisbane's Big Sound Festival. In October, the band was invited to London by Kerrang! magazine, for a photo shoot and two private concerts; Kerrang called the band "Canada's best-kept secret".

Your Favorite Enemies played Canadian Music Week in May 2014, and was included in the Canadian Blast showcase hosted by the Canadian Independent Music Association at the 2014 MIDEM in Cannes. The band then embarked on a UK tour called From Upper Room To Higher Sky, where they played venues such as King Tuts, The Barfly, The Thekla, and The Esquires.

The France-exclusive five-track EP Entre Marées Et Autres Ressacs was released on April 22, 2014. It was made available on the band's online store in limited number, and sold out in less than two weeks. Entre Marées Et Autres Ressacs received positive reviews from numerous French webzines, amongst them Muzzart, Metalland, and Obskure Mag.

On April 20, 2014, one month before its official release, the album Between Illness And Migration was made available on iTunes. On the day of its release, May 20, it peaked at #2 in the iTunes chart. It was also #6 on Canadian charts, which earned the band the title of "best-selling artist of the week" at HMV and Archambault. The release of the album and its position in Canadian charts garnered media attention.

The album's first single, "I Just Want You To Know", started airing on the Montreal station CHOM-FM in April, and was chosen by Slaves on Dope's Jason Rockman as "Big Shiny New Song of the Week" on April 21; the song was played as often as once a day. The band also gave a live performance and interview with The Rockman at the studios of the station. The official video clip for the song was also added to the rotation on MuchMusic and MusiquePlus. The music video for the song "1-2-3 (One Step Away)", earned an exclusive premiere on the website of Kerrang! magazine, prior to its official release on March 18, 2016.

Through April and May, the band toured the USA, supporting ...And You Will Know Us by the Trail of Dead.

At the Juno Awards of 2015, Between Illness And Migration was nominated for "Rock Album of the Year".

On June 17, 2016, Your Favorite Enemies released Between Illness And Migration, Tokyo Sessions, a new interpretation of the album. In addition to re-imagined version of all 12 original tracks, there were radio edits of the singles "1-2-3 (One Step Away)", "A View From Within", "I Just Want You To Know", and "Where Did We Lose Each Other". The album made its debut in the 6th position of the Soundscan sales in Canada. On iTunes, the album made a top-5 debut in four categories, hitting No. 4 in overall album sales, No. 2 on the Rock chart, No. 3 on the Alternative chart, and No. 2 among Canadian releases.

=== A Journey Beyond Ourselves (2017) ===
Your Favorite Enemies decided to celebrate their years of touring by issuing a hand-crafted collector book, which would gather songs they had written in the previous five years. They issued a limited-edition vinyl box set and storybook called "A Journey Beyond Ourselves". The box used their own "lathe cut" technology to craft the vinyls, while also screen-printing the book themselves. The album was offered to a limited number of independent record stores in the Montreal area. It was released on September 1, 2017, after the videoclip for the song "Underneath A Blooming Skylight" was premiered by Exclaim! on July 4. The set was sold out on October 5; the band decided not to release an album digitally.

In 2020, Your Favourite Enemies released the compilation album The Early Days. As of 2021, Alex Henry Foster was performing as a solo artist and Sef Lemelin had recorded a solo albums.

== Activism ==
Your Favorite Enemies supports Amnesty International, (RED), Rock N' Rights, and War Child. Alex Henry Foster, a former social worker, has been an official Amnesty International spokesperson for many years. He acts as a conference speaker in Canada, has hosted the Annual Youth Congress of Amnesty International several times, and wrote a song for the release of Fred M'membe. The band participated in Amnesty International's 30th anniversary (2007), in the 35th anniversary of Give Peace A Chance, in Imagine (2004) and Marche des femmes vers l'an 2000, and performed at the concert of the 51st anniversary of the Charter of Human Rights and Freedoms.

In April 2005, Alex Henry Foster and Jeff Beaulieu founded Rock And Rights, a non-profit organization actively dedicated to human rights awareness, education, promotion and mobilization towards equality, dignity and justice for all, despite beliefs, sex, religion, sexual orientation, language and nationality. During the 2006 Vans Warped Tour in Toronto, Jeff Beaulieu conducted an interview about human rights with Pat Thetic of Anti-Flag. In 2010, for The Universal Declaration of Human Rights Day, the band produced a video with a strong and engaging message, supporting at the same time Amnesty International's efforts for the "Write for Rights" campaign through art. They did the same in 2011, with a different video that carried the same message.

== Awards and nominations ==
=== Juno Awards ===
The Juno Awards is a Canadian awards ceremony presented annually by the Canadian Academy of Recording Arts and Sciences.

Year	Nominee / work	Award	Result
2015	Between Illness and Migration	Rock Album of the Year	Nominated

== Discography ==
Albums

- Love Is a Promise Whispering Goodbye (2008)
- Love Is a Promise Whispering Goodbye (Deluxe & Remastered) (2011)
- Running Through the Rain of Estrangement... Catching Pure Drops of Diamond Bliss (2012)
- Vague Souvenir (2012)
- Sacred Kind of Whispers (2013)
- Between Illness and Migration (Japanese Edition) (2013), King Records (Japan)
- Between Illness and Migration (Australian Edition) (2013)
- Between Illness and Migration (Canadian Edition) (2014)
- Between Illness and Migration (European Edition) (2014), Graphite Records (UK)
- Between Illness and Migration (India Edition) (2015), Times Music
- Between Illness and Migration - Deluxe: Tokyo Sessions (2016) • MC: Gold
- A Journey Beyond Ourselves (2017)
- The Early Days (Compilation Album, 2020)

EPs

- And If I Was to Die in the Morning... Would I Still Be Sleeping with You (2007)
- Youthful Dreams of an Old Empire (2013)
- Entre Marées Et Autres Ressacs (2014)
- Where Did We Lose Each Other (2014)
- A Vision of the Lights We're In (2015)
- The Uplifting Sound Of An Epiphanic Awakening (2016)

Other

- Excerpts from the Dissidia Final Fantasy Original Soundtrack, Takeharu Ishimoto, Nobuo Uematsu, Tsuyoshi Sekito, Your Favorite Enemies (2009), Square Enix

DVDs

- Running Through the Rain of Estrangement... Catching Pure Drops of Diamond Bliss (2012)
- The Uplifting Sound of an Epiphanic Awakening (2011)

Side projects

- Windows in the Sky, Alex Henry Foster (November 9, 2018)
- Deconstruction, Sef Lemelin (2019)
