= Sunn O))) discography =

Band discography

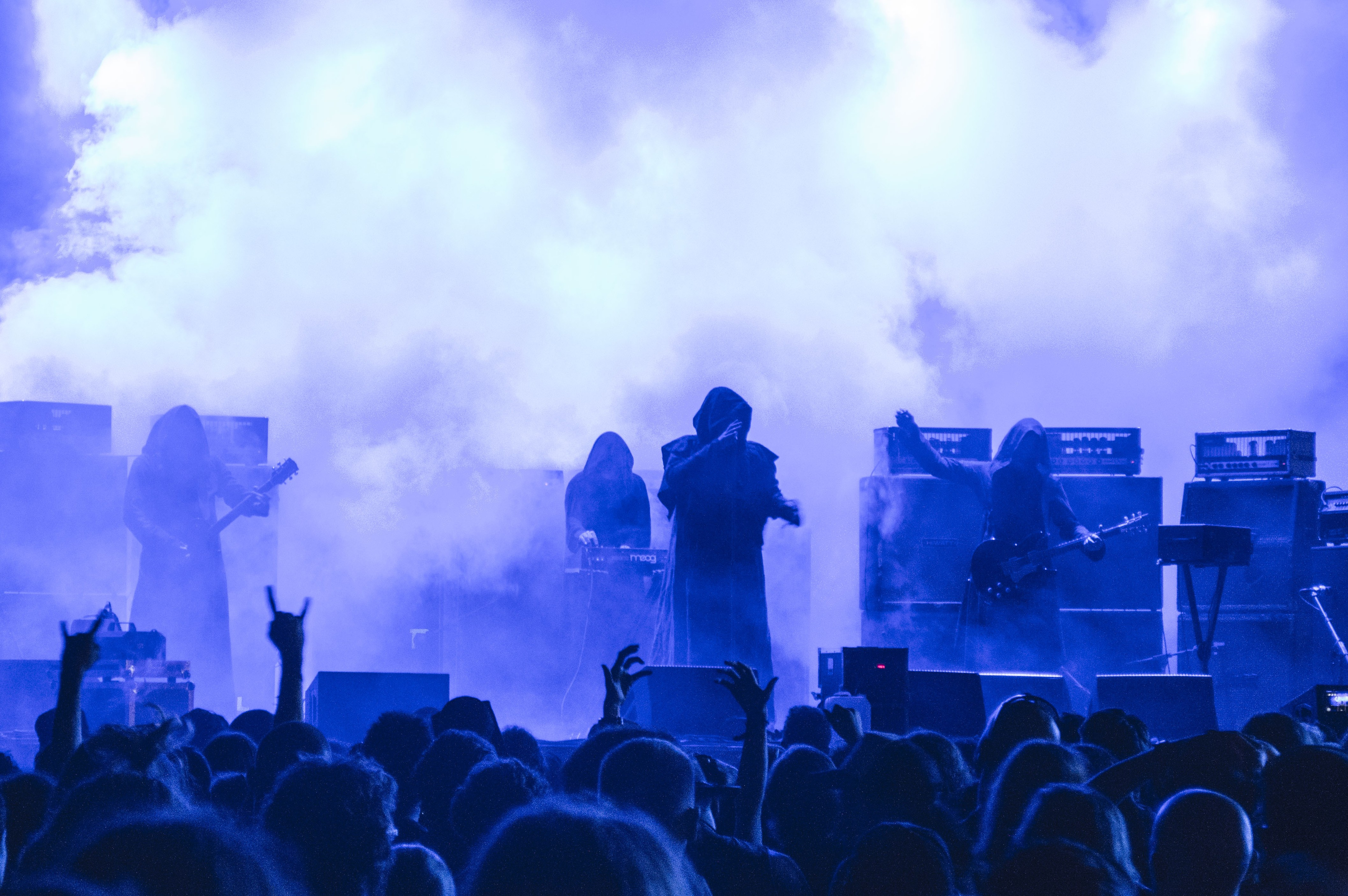
- Studio albums: 10
- EPs: 6
- Live albums: 9
- Compilation albums: 1
- Singles: 2
- Collaborative albums: 3
- Demos: 8
- Remix albums: 1

The discography of Sunn O))), an American drone metal band, consists of ten studio albums, three collaborative albums, six EPs, four demos, one remix album, eight official live albums (plus one hundred and fifteen collected bootleg live recordings), one box set compilation, two stand-alone singles and three compilation contributions.

Founded by Greg Anderson and Stephen O'Malley, Sunn O))) is an experimental drone metal band that formed in Seattle, Washington, in 1998 originally under the name "Mars". The band signed with Hydra Head Records, founded by Isis frontman Aaron Turner, and released both The Grimmrobe Demos and its debut album ØØ Void. At the same time, Anderson founded his own label Southern Lord Records, which would become the band's primary outlet for most of their releases throughout their entire career. The band's first release through the label was Flight of the Behemoth (2002), which notably included two collaborations with Japanese noise artist Merzbow. They describe the sound and their approach to their first three major releases as worshiping the drone metal band Earth and sludge metal band Melvins, both from Sunn O)))'s home state of Washington. Sunn O)))'s next two albums, White1 (2003) and White2 (2004), were written and recorded at the same time and was said of the band to be an important turning point in the band's sound that allowed them to create the albums that would follow. They released the "claustrophobic" black metal album Black One (2005) and a collaboration with Japanese noise rock band Boris titled Altar (2006). Their interest in pushing the boundaries of metal music culminated in the orchestral Monoliths & Dimensions (2009), a critically acclaimed album that broke through the underground scene, landing on Billboard's Top Heatseekers chart.

While Anderson founded the Southern Lord label, in 2011 O'Malley founded his own label named Ideologic Organ, an imprint of the Viennese electronic/experimental label Editions Mego. Through Ideologic Organ, Sunn O))) began releasing odds-and-ends albums, including the demos Rehearsal Demo Nov 11 2011 and Downtown LA Rehearsal / Rifftape March 1998, and the single "青木ヶ原 // 樹海". In 2014, the band released two collaborative albums: Terrestrials with Norwegian experimental group Ulver and Soused with avant-garde musician Scott Walker, the latter of which became Sunn O)))'s most commercially successful album, landing at #88 on the Billboard 200, and was the final studio album by Walker before his death in 2019. The band's next album Kannon was born out of the Monoliths & Dimensions sessions and centers its theme around the female Buddhist Goddess of Mercy. In 2019, the band released Life Metal, featuring a comparatively more positive tone and mood, and Pyroclasts, a meditative experimental album produced by Steve Albini (Shellac, Big Black).

Sunn O)))'s discography features several limited-edition and tour-exclusive albums. The band has said these albums are a "win-win" solution that provide a reward to diehard fans and also help to fund expensive world tours. Most of the band's albums have been released in Japan through the local Daymare Recordings. In April 2013, Sunn O))) uploaded its entire discography to the music streaming platform Bandcamp. In June 2015, Sunn O))) launched a Live Archive of fan-submitted "unmixed, unmastered raw footage" of live performances through both their official website and Bandcamp. The archive launched with 67 recordings dating back to 2002.

== Albums ==
=== Studio albums ===
Album	Released	Label	Producer(s)	Details
ØØ Void	June 26, 2000	Hydra Head	Scott Reeder	Noted at the time of release for having considerably higher production quality than the band's previous release, The Grimmrobe Demos. The 2008 Japanese version included a bonus disc titled The Iron Soul of Nothing, which is a remix of ØØ Void by Nurse with Wound. After going out of print, Southern Lord reissued the album in 2011 with updated artwork.
Flight of the Behemoth	January 22, 2002	Southern Lord	Greg Anderson, Mathias Schneeberger	The album is sometimes referred to as 3: Flight of the Behemoth. Sunn O))) collaborated with Japanese noise artist Merzbow for two of the album's tracks, while the closing song "F.W.T.B.T." is a drone interpretation of Metallica's "For Whom the Bell Tolls". While the first two tracks resemble the band's classic doom metal formula, William York of AllMusic noted that on the other tracks, Sunn O))) "for the first time also [branches] out to create something new, something that goes beyond any sort of mere Earth worship." The Japanese and Bandcamp editions of the album include two additional live collaborations with Merzbow as bonus tracks.
White1	April 22, 2003	Southern Lord	Rex Ritter, Sunn O)))	Before being known as White1 and White2, Sunn O))) wasn't sure how many albums their material would turn out to be and referred to these recordings simply as "The White Sessions". Written and recorded simultaneously but released a year apart, White1 and White2 sees Sunn O))) making a major stylistic departure from their earlier work. In an interview, Anderson said, "We decided to get out and get weird with it. I'm really glad that we did that and that we decided to make [those albums] because it opened the doors and set the table for us to really get to where we are now." Both albums prominently feature a synthesizer for the first time in the band's history, as well as include many guest collaborators. While previous albums included screaming, the band considers the spoken word poetry from Julian Cope on White1 to be the first real vocals on a Sunn O))) album. Both White1 and White2 were remastered by Matt Colton and reissued through Southern Lord in 2018 for the label's 20th Anniversary.
White2	June 29, 2004	Southern Lord	Rex Ritter, Sunn O)))	
Black One	October 17, 2005	Southern Lord	Sunn O))), Mathias Schneeberger	The music of Black One has been described as "suffocating" and "claustrophobic", achieved in part from harsh noise musician John Wiese as guest and by recording vocals from inside a coffin inside a hearse. Black One is also tied to the genre of black metal in several ways: incorporating the genre into Sunn O)))'s signature drone sound, including a cover of Immortal's "Cursed Realms (Of the Winterdemons)", including guest vocals from Malefic (Xasthur) and Wrest (Leviathan), and paying homage to Bathory with the closing track "Báthory Erzsébet". Early editions were packaged with the live album Solstitium Fulminate, later available digitally.
Monoliths & Dimensions	May 18, 2009	Southern Lord	Mell Dettmer, Randall Dunn	Thom Jurek of AllMusic described Monoliths and Dimensions as a "wide-ranging adventure". Sunn O))) set out to make an album that opposed the "claustrophobic" feeling of their previous album Black One. Two years in the making, the orchestral album features dozens of collaborators from around the globe including Australian multi-instrumentalist Oren Ambarchi, composer Eyvind Kang and a Vietnamese women's choir. Critics drew comparisons to avant-garde music-theorist John Cage and minimalist composer Arvo Pärt. Monoliths and Dimensions was met with widespread critical acclaim upon release.
Kannon	December 4, 2015	Southern Lord	Randall Dunn, Sunn O)))	Following the ambitious Monoliths & Dimensions and high-profile experimental collaborations with Scott Walker (Soused) and Ulver (Terrestrials), Kannon was described as "a return to the elements" of the band's more straightforward early years. Sometimes represented as "观世音 Kannon", the title is the Japanese name for Guanyin, the Goddess of Mercy in Buddhism who "hears the suffering of the universe and then transforms that energy into compassion and relief". The concept originated in 2006 during the Monoliths & Dimensions sessions and an early version of "Kannon 3" appears on their 2008 live album, Dømkirke. Early copies were packaged with a bonus flexi-disc single of the track "青木ヶ原 // 樹海".
Life Metal	April 26, 2019	Southern Lord	Sunn O)))	The title refers to an inside joke used to humorously comment on anything positive and opposing "doom and gloom" vibes. Sunn O))) picked the title because it reflected the album's more lively and beautiful music, and also represents the band members' more positive and upbeat outlook on life at the time of writing. Life Metal was recorded and edited entirely on analog tape with Steve Albini, who was said to have captured the band's live sound without use of Pro Tools. Instead of frequent guest-vocals collaborator Attila Csihar, the album features vocals from multi-instrumentalist Hildur Guðnadóttir to match Life Metal's softer tone.
Pyroclasts	October 25, 2019	Southern Lord	Sunn O)))	Written and recorded by Steve Albini at the same time as Life Metal, Pyroclasts is an experimental and improvisational album. Sunn O))) plus additional collaborators live recorded a new 12-minute improvized drone session at the start or end of each day during the recording of Life Metal. Pyroclasts is a collection of four of those tracks. The title refers to volcanic airborne pyroclastic rock.
Sunn O)))	April 3, 2026	Sub Pop	Brad Wood, Sunn O)))	

=== Collaborative albums ===
Album	Released	Label	Producer(s)	Details
Altar (with Boris)	October 31, 2006	Southern Lord	Sunn O)))	Stephen O'Malley first met Atsuo of the Japanese noise rock band Boris in the mid-1990s and remained close ever since. Cam Lindsay of Exclaim! described the pairing of Sunn O))) and Boris for Altar as "a union that any doom metal fan has been praying for." In addition to members of Boris and Sunn O))), Altar also features Kim Thayil (Soundgarden), Joe Preston (Thrones), Phil Wandscher (Whiskeytown) and singer-songwriter Jesse Sykes, among others. Initial copies included the 28-minute bonus track "Her Lips Were Wet with Venom".
Terrestrials (with Ulver)	February 3, 2014	Southern Lord	Stephen O'Malley, Kristoffer Rygg	Sunn O))) previously collaborated with Norwegian experimental band Ulver on the song "Cut Wooded", released on WHITEbox and later editions of White1. The tracks on Terrestrials date back to three live improvisation sessions in Ulver's Crystal Canyon studio in 2008. They slowly worked on Terrestrials over five years in part because of the distance, but also because the project wasn't a main priority for either band. Daniel O'Sullivan compared the project to the film Koyaanisqatsi's opening scene, while O'Malley described the process as being "more raga than it was rock" that was "actually quite a blissed out, psychedelic session".
Soused (with Scott Walker)	October 21, 2014	4AD	Scott Walker, Peter Walsh	Sunn O))) originally reached out to avant-garde artist Scott Walker to collaborate on Monoliths & Dimensions. Walker declined the offer, but later returned to the band in 2013 with material that was specifically designed for collaboration. Lars Gotrich of NPR described Soused as "deafeningly sublime" and "a dark and wild leap into the abyss that was also pretty ridiculous, using American bullwhips as percussion and plunging Walker's harrowing croon into unknown depths." Walker died in 2019, but not before explaining to The Guardian in 2018 that he rates all of his albums in his mind and felt Soused was "pretty perfect".

=== EPs ===
EP	Released	Label	Producer(s)	Details
Veils It White	September 4, 2003	Thin the Herd	Sunn O)))	James Plotkin, audio engineer and member of O'Malley's doom metal band Khanate, took parts of Flight of the Behemoth and remixed them into a single track titled "Veils It White". In his review for AllMusic, James Mason said the song follows the "progression from an Earth tribute band, to the avant-metallers that they would become on White2."
CroMonolithic Remixes for an Iron Age	November 8, 2004	Southern Lord	Sunn O)))	A limited-edition two-track remix EP sold exclusively on tour. The first track is a remix of the Earth song "Teeth of Lions Rule the Divine" from their debut album Earth 2 (1993). The song was later released on the Earth tribute album Legacy of Dissolution (2005). The second track is a remix of the Merzbow song "Catch 22" from his album Frog (2001). A shorter version of the song was previously released on the Merzbow remix album Frog Remixed and Revisited (2003).
Candlewolf of the Golden Chalice	2005	Anti-Mosh	Sunn O)))	Commissioned by John Peel himself but recorded after his death, "Candlewolf of the Golden Chalice" is Sunn O)))'s live BBC Radio 1 Peel Session that aired during the 2004 winter solstice. The band pressed it on vinyl and released it as a tour exclusive on early 2005 dates.
Angel Coma (split with Earth)	February 8, 2006	Southern Lord	Sunn O)))	The title "Angel Coma" is an amalgamation of the split EP's two tracks: Sunn O)))'s "Coma Mirror" and Earth's "A Plague of Angels". Earth's track later appeared on their 2007 album Hibernaculum. The limited-edition EP was originally released on 2006 tour dates.
Oracle	April 1, 2007	Southern Lord	Sunn O)))	In 2006, Sunn O))) collaborated with sculptor/installation artist Banks Violette for an exhibit at London's Maureen Paley gallery. The exhibit took place in two rooms: one with a black stage where the band recorded "Orakulum" with Attila Csihar locked inside a white coffin, and one with a white replica of the band's stage set up (including amps and guitars) cast out of salt and resin with a destroyed black coffin. The audience was locked outside for the performance and let inside after the band left "to generate a feeling of absence, loss and a phantom of what was."
Che (split with Alan Vega and Stephen Burroughs)	August 4, 2009	Blast First Petite	Rex Ritter, Sunn O)))	Part of the Alan Vega 70th Birthday Limited Edition EP Series commemorating Alan Vega, vocalist for the proto-punk band Suicide. Sunn O)))'s contribution to the EP and the collection overall was a cover of Suicide's song "Che", the closing track on the band's critically acclaimed debut album Suicide (1977). The song was also a collaboration between Sunn O))) and Finnish electronic group Pan Sonic.
Eternity’s Pillars b/w Raise the Chalice & Reverential Maxi-LP	October 14, 2025	Sub Pop Records	Sunn O))) & Brad Wood	

=== Demo albums ===
Album	Released	Label	Producer(s)	Details
The Grimmrobe Demos	1999	Hydra Head	Mathias Schneeberger	Sunn O)))'s debut release that exclusively features Stephen O'Malley and Greg Anderson as a duo. Its initial run was limited to only 500 copies. The album's sound was heavily inspired by Melvins, and Earth's debut album Earth 2: Special Low Frequency Version. The closing track is named after Earth founder Dylan Carlson, who would later collaborate with Sunn O))) on several releases. The Grimmrobe Demos was re-mastered and re-issued through Southern Lord in 2005 with bonus tracks.
Rehearsal Demo Nov 11 2011	June 1, 2012	Southern Lord, Ideologic Organ	Sunn O)))	Rehearsal Demo Nov 11 2011 is a live recording of a session from Los Angeles in November 2011, which was mixed in Paris in January 2012 and mastered by Brad Boatright (From Ashes Rise). The demo notably samples audio from the 1989 Russian film A Visitor to a Museum, directed by Konstantin Lopushansky. It was initially exclusively sold during Sunn O)))'s 2012 tours.
LA Reh 012	January 20, 2014	Southern Lord, Ideologic Organ	Sunn O)))	Seen by some as a "sequel" to Rehearsal Demo Nov 11 2011 due to the artwork, LA Reh 012 was recorded in Los Angeles in 2012, mixed in Paris in 2013 and ultimately mastered by Brad Boatright in 2013. A press release described the demo as being full of "hellish riff-mangling".
Downtown LA Rehearsal / Rifftape March 1998	May 30, 2018	Southern Lord, Ideologic Organ	Sunn O)))	Released as part of Sunn O)))'s 20th anniversary celebration, Downtown LA Rehearsal / Rifftape March 1998 document's the band first-ever recording—a year before the release of The Grimmrobe Demos. Eight songs in two tracks were recorded to cassette tape on a boombox in 1998, with Brad Boatright mastering those unearthed tapes in February 2018. The now-defunct Downtown Rehearsal space in Los Angeles was also used by Melvins and Goatsnake at the time.
Life Metal Rehearsal 230518	May 1, 2020	Ideologic Organ	Stephen O'Malley	During the COVID-19 pandemic, Sunn O))) released three demo rehearsal sessions from their eighth studio album, Life Metal, recorded in May 2018. The tracks consist of "demos of riffs and production ideas," some of which would eventually be reworked into tracks for Life Metal and its sister album Pyroclasts. All three demo albums were available digitally through Bandcamp for one day only. Their release date coincided with a date Bandcamp announced it would be waiving its fees during the pandemic to support artists, and Sunn O))) announced all proceeds from the demo albums' sales would be donated to Global Food Banking Network. The charity supports food banks around the world that were impacted by the pandemic.
Life Metal Rehearsal 250518	May 1, 2020	Ideologic Organ	Stephen O'Malley	
Life Metal Rehearsal 260518	May 1, 2020	Ideologic Organ	Stephen O'Malley	
25th Anniversary Rehearsal Demo LP	November 22, 2023	Southern Lord, Ideologic Organ	Brad Wood	Recorded in the same sessions as "Evil Chuck" / "Ron G Warrior" with Brad Wood in early 2023, the 25th Anniversary Rehearsal Demo LP contains the tracks "Wyoming Big Sky" and "Acres of Calms". The demo was limited to 1,000 vinyl copies and sold exclusively during their late-2023 Shoshin (初心) Duo tours, beginning with a concert commemorating Sunn O)))'s 25th anniversary and Earth's 35th anniversary.

=== Remix albums ===
Album	Released	Label	Producer(s)	Details
The Iron Soul of Nothing (by Nurse With Wound)	November 28, 2011	Ideologic Organ	Scott Reeder, Sunn O)))	In 2007, Sunn O))) commissioned British experimental dark ambient collective Nurse with Wound to remix their debut album ØØ Void. Sunn O))) recovered the original Mell Dettmer analog tapes and the initial request was to create something similar to Nurse with Wound's critically acclaimed 1988 album Soliloquy for Lilith. The album was originally released with the 2008 Japanese edition of ØØ Void, but was later released independently as its own album. Becoming the third overall Ideologic Organ release, the stand-alone version of the album splits "Ra at Dawn" into two parts as it was too long to fit on a single LP side.

=== Live albums ===
Album	Released	Label	Recording	Details
The Libations of Samhain	2003	Bastet	Steve Pittis	Sometimes referred to as LXNDXN Subcamden Underworld Hallo'Ween 2003, the live album's sole musical track "The Libations of Samhain" is a single 40-minute-long low-fidelity recording that includes themes of various Sunn O))) songs. The album was initially limited to 500 vinyl copies released through Arthur magazine's then-new record label Bastet.
Live White	2004	Archive	Scott Slimm	Includes several tracks from both White1 and White2 under different track names, and an early version of "Orthodox Caveman" released on Black One a year later. Live White was also included as a part of Sunn O)))'s box set WHITEbox.
Solstitium Fulminate	October 18, 2005	Southern Lord	Oren Ambarchi	Initially released as a limited-edition bonus CD with early copies of Black One, Solstitium Fulminate features recordings of Sunn O)))'s 2005 European Tour, including their performance at Roskilde Festival. The album was later made available digitally.
La Mort Noir dans Esch/Alzette	May 1, 2006	Southern Lord	Randall Dunn	A live recording of Sunn O)))'s performance at the Kulturfabrik Esch-sur-Alzette concert hall in Luxembourg in February 2006. It was initially released as a limited-edition CD, but was later made available digitally.
Dømkirke	September 22, 2008	Southern Lord	Isak Strand	Dømkirke was recorded live in the 12th-century Bergen Cathedral in Bergen, Norway as the conclusion to Borealis Festival 2007. The cathedral has one of the largest pipe organs in Scandinavia, which Sunn O))) incorporated into their performance. Borealis curator Nicholas Mollerhaug commissioned the band to perform "gothic Gregorian hymns of the Late Middle Ages" that reflect "the despair, the terrors and darkness of the world". The band did not publicize vocalist Attila Csihar's appearance in advance because of his connection to the black metal genre, and by extension, black metal's association with church burnings.
(初心) Grimmrobes Live 101008	April 1, 2009	Southern Lord	Geoff Gans	To commemorate the band's 10th anniversary in 2008, Sunn O))) went on a four-date US tour dubbed the "Shoshin/GrimmRobes" tour. (初心) Grimmrobes Live 101008 is a live recording of the first date of that tour in Los Angeles. For this tour, O'Malley and Anderson performed as a duo without any additional collaborators and exclusively performed material from The Grimmrobe Demos. Sunn O))) said they adopted a mindset of Shoshin—a Zen Buddhist philosophy of the "beginner's mind" that allows for openness and eagerness.
Agharti Live 09-10	March 1, 2011	Southern Lord	Randall Dunn	Originally released as part of the 2010 Southern Lord Subscription Series.
НЕЖИТЬ: живьём в России	June 3, 2016	Southern Lord, Ideologic Organ	Wolfsblood	Translating to either "Undead: Live In Russia" or "No Life: Alive In Moscow", the 3×LP documents the band's first ever live performance in Russia on August 11, 2015. Credited as "Санн О)))" for this release, the audio is a blending of recordings from both the soundboard and an audience member.
Metta, Benevolence	January 22, 2022	Southern Lord		Released under the full title of Metta, Benevolence BBC6 Music: Live on the Invitation of Mary Anne Hobbs, the live album was commissioned by English DJ Mary Anne Hobbs of BBC Radio 6 Music for Hobbs' Samhain event. The album was recorded at BBC's Maida Vale Studios in October 2019 following Sunn O)))'s UK tour in support of Life Metal and Pyroclasts. Metta, Benevolence features live versions of songs found on Life Metal and Pyroclasts with guest vocals and synths from Swedish musician Anna von Hausswolff.
Note: In addition to the above list of live releases, Sunn O))) and Southern Lord maintain an archive of unofficial bootleg live recordings both on the Sunn O))) official website and the Sunn O))) Live Archives Bandcamp page, a separate account from their main Bandcamp profile. The collection includes dozens of recordings dating back to 2002.

=== Compilations ===
Album	Released	Label	Producer(s)	Details
WHITEbox	July 20, 2006	Southern Lord	various	The standard-edition of WHITEbox is a collection of both White1 and White2 on vinyl with the bonus tracks "Cut Wooded" (with Ulver) and "Decay [The Symptoms of Kali Yuga]", respectively. A limited-edition pressing of WHITEbox includes White1, White2 (both with bonus tracks), both discs of White Live and Candlewolf of the Golden Chalice all on vinyl.

== Songs ==
=== Singles ===
Song	Released	Label	Producer(s)	Details
"青木ヶ原 // 樹海"	December 13, 2016	Sabbath Rehash, Ideologic Organ	Sunn O)))	Also referred to as "Aokigahara // Jukai", the single was originally a bonus limited-edition flexi disc released with some editions of Sunn O)))'s 2015 album Kannon, but was released as a digital single a year later for free through Bandcamp. The title takes its name from Aokigahara, a forest in Japan that in recent years has become a popular suicide site, and Jukai, the Japanese word for a Buddhist initiation ritual.
"Evil Chuck" / "Ron G Warrior"	October 25, 2023	Sub Pop	Brad Wood	During soundchecks on the band's 2022–2023 Shoshin (初心) tour, Sunn O))) live-recorded new music with Chris Fullard. The recordings were sent to Brad Wood to edit and arrange, then to Matt Colton to cut the vinyl. The single was released as part of Sub Pop Records' Singles Club Vol. 8 collection originally as a digital single with a 7" vinyl mailed to Singles Club subscribers shortly after. The single's release also coincided with Sunn O)))'s 25th anniversary and Sub Pop's 35 anniversary.

=== Original compilation contributions ===
This is not an exhaustive list; songs that were first released on the band's albums, EPs, or singles are not included.
Song	Released	Label	Producer(s)	Details
"BP//Simple"	November 13, 2006	Staubgold	Sunn O)))	Appears on the various artists compilation Jukebox Buddha. Each one of the album's tracks uses a little mechanical Buddha Machine—a small device for looping music that was originally used for looping meditative Buddhist mantras, but became popular in experimental music after musician and producer Brian Eno began using one. "BP//Simple" is a remix/alternate version of "Belülrol Pusztít" from Oracle using Buddha Machines. Ned Raggett of AllMusic wrote that their contribution "shows what depths can be further conjured out of the device."
"Isengard (Chopped & Screwed)"	February 8, 2010	Three:Four	Sunn O)))	Appears on the various artists compilation Does Your Cat Know My Dog?: Bad Bonn's Selection for the New Ear. The album was a limited-edition 12" LP released by the curators of Switzerland's Bad Bonn Kilbi music festival. The title is a reference to Isengard, the fictional fortress from writer J. R. R. Tolkien's legendarium.
"End of the Rising"	May 3, 2019	Williams Street	Sunn O)))	Appears on Adult Swim's various artists compilation Metal Swim 2, a follow-up to Metal Swim released nine years prior. The compilation was curated by Adult Swim producer Laura Sterritt who sought out to compile a list of songs from artists she deemed "forerunners from metal's wide swath of subgenres". "End of the Rising" is an unused demo track from the Life Metal pre-production sessions.
"Dream Canyon"	September 4, 2020	n/a	Sunn O)))	Appears on Shut it Down: Benefit for the Movement for Black Lives, a 46-track various artists compilation released exclusively on Bandcamp. During the COVID-19 pandemic for one Friday each month of 2020, Bandcamp waved its share of the proceeds and instead gave it to the artists. Shut it Down coincided with one of these events and donated all proceeds to the organization Movement for Black Lives in response to the 2020–2021 United States racial unrest. "Dream Canyon" was written during the Life Metal sessions.

== Videos ==
=== Music videos ===
Song	Released	Album	Director	Details
"Brando" (with Scott Walker)	October 23, 2014	Soused	Gisèle Vienne	"Brando" is a short film directed by French cinematographer Gisèle Vienne, who has previously collaborated with Stephen O'Malley on a handful of non-Sunn O))) projects. The song is named after American actor Marlon Brando, who was noted by collaborator Scott Walker to get beaten up in most of his films. The lyrics are about "masochistic longing" and even use whips as percussion, and the film reflects these themes with images of bonding, darkness, violence and subtle horror. The video ends with Catherine Robbe-Grillet—famed BDSM erotic novel writer and author of L'Image (1956)—arriving on the scene.

== Reception ==
=== Critical response ===
Album	Year	Metacritic	AnyDecentMusic?	Album of the Year
Black One	2005	—	—	90 (6 reviews)
Altar	2006	—	—	77 (6 reviews)
Monoliths & Dimensions	2009	88 (16 reviews)	8.2 (12 reviews)	86 (13 reviews)
The Iron Soul of Nothing	2011	75 (6 reviews)	—	—
Terrestrials	2014	78 (22 reviews)	7.4 (16 reviews)	73 (14 reviews)
Soused	2014	83 (29 reviews)	7.9 (33 reviews)	82 (32 reviews)
Kannon	2015	81 (25 reviews)	7.4 (27 reviews)	75 (21 reviews)
Life Metal	2019	85 (16 reviews)	8.2 (16 reviews)	83 (11 reviews)
Pyroclasts	2019	76 (12 reviews)	7.4 (13 reviews)	77 (12 reviews)

=== Chart performance ===
Album	Year	US Billboard 200	US Rock Albums	US Alt Rock Albums	US Hard Rock Albums	US Indie Albums	US Top Heatseekers	US Tastemakers	Belgium (Ultratop)	Finland (OFC)	Ireland (IRMA)	UK (OCC)
Monoliths & Dimensions	2009	—	—	—	—	—	14	—	—	—	—	—
Terrestrials	2014	—	—	—	—	—	43	—	—	49	—	—
Soused	2014	88	23	15	2	13	—	8	46	41	54	30
Kannon	2015	—	—	—	15	—	—	—	—	—	—	—
Life Metal	2019	—	—	—	22	2	—	20	—	—	—	—
Pyroclasts	2019	—	—	—	—	49	—	—	—	—	—	—

== See also ==
- List of songs recorded by Sunn O)))
- Southern Lord Records discography
- Stephen O'Malley discography
- Greg Anderson discography
