= List of songs recorded by Sunn O))) =

Songs recorded by Sunn O)))

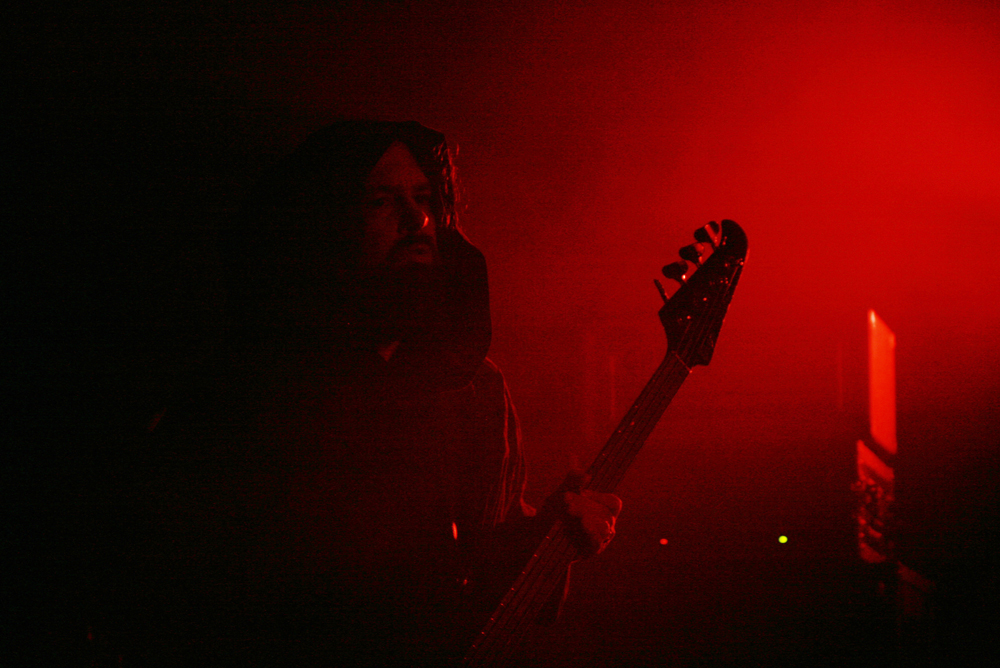
Stephen O'Malley performing with Sunn O))) in 2008.

The following is list of every song the American drone metal band Sunn O))) has officially released. It includes songs released on studio albums, live albums, EPs, singles, demos, various artist compilation albums, collaborative albums, remix albums, as well as songs exclusively released on limited-edition or international versions of albums. The list does not include unreleased tracks, unrecorded live tracks, bootleg recordings, or songs originally released on albums later added to a compilation.

Since forming in 1998, the Seattle-based band has released more than 130 tracks as of 2019.

== Songs ==
Song	Album	Notes	Length	Year
"A)))"	НЕЖИТЬ: живьём в России	live recording	17:47	2016
"A/Interior I/Eye"	Agharti Live 09-10	live recording	22:30	2011
"A Shaving of the Horn that Speared You"	White1		17:52	2003
"Acres of Calms"	25th Anniversary Rehearsal Demo LP		20:00	2023
"Aghartha"	Monoliths & Dimensions		17:34	2009
"Akuma no Kuma"	Altar	collaboration with Boris	7:52	2006
"Alice"	Monoliths & Dimensions		16:20	2009
"Ampliphædies (E)"	Pyroclasts		11:03	2019
"Ascension (A)"	Pyroclasts		10:54	2019
"Ash on the Trees (The Sudden Ebb of a Diatribe)	Iron Soul of Nothing	remix by Nurse with Wound; initially on ØØ Void bonus disc	17:07	2011
"Aurora"	Life Metal		19:07	2019
"B)))"	НЕЖИТЬ: живьём в России	live recording	15:15	2016
"B-Alien Skeleton"	LiveWhite	live recording	14:06	2004
"B-Witch"	LiveWhite	live recording	8:21	2004
"BassAliens"	White2		23:22	2004
"Báthory Erzsébet"	Black One		16:00	2005
"Bathory, A Tribute To..."	LiveWhite	live recording	5:22	2004
"Belülrol Pusztít"	Oracle		16:01	2007
"Between Sleipnir's Breaths"	Life Metal		12:39	2019
"Big Church [Megszentségteleníthetetlenségeskedéseitekért]"	Monoliths & Dimensions		9:43	2009
"Black Wedding"	The Grimmrobe Demos		19:17	1999
"Blood Swamp"	Altar	collaboration with Boris	14:46	2006
"BP//Simple"	Jukebox Buddha	reinterpretation of "Belülrol Pusztít"	10:06	2006
"Brando" ("Brando (Dwellers on the Bluff)" on vinyl edition)	Soused	collaboration with Scott Walker	8:42	2014
"Bremerton"	The Grimmrobe Demos (vinyl re-issue bonus track)		16:20	2005
"Bull"	Soused	collaboration with Scott Walker	9:21	2014
"C)))"	НЕЖИТЬ: живьём в России	live recording	21:54	2016
"CandleGoat"	Black One		8:04	2005
"CandleGoat/Bathori"	La Mort Noir dans Esch/Alzette	live recording	21:54	2006
"Candlewolff ov Thee Golden Chalice"	Candlewolff ov Thee Golden Chalice	live recording	19:26	2005
"Cannon"	Dømkirke	live recording	18:05	2008
"Catch 22 (Surrender or Die)"	Cro-Monolithic Remixes for an Iron Age	remix of "Catch 22" by Merzbow	12:36	2004
"Caveman Salad"	LiveWhite	live recording	2:50	2004
"Che"	Che	originally by Suicide; collaboration with Pan Sonic	5:58	2009
"Churchdust"	Agharti Live 09-10	live recording	6:06	2011
"Coma Mirror"	Angel Coma		13:13	2006
"Cry for the Weeper"	Black One		14:38	2005
"Cursed Realms (Of the Winterdemons)"	Black One	originally by Immortal	10:10	2005
"Cut Wooded"	White1 (vinyl edition bonus track)	collaboration with Ulver	15:21	2003
"Cymatics"	Dømkirke	live recording	15:46	2008
"D)))"	НЕЖИТЬ: живьём в России	live recording	18:00	2016
"Death Becomes You"	Flight of the Behemoth		13:09	2002
"Death Becomes You"	LiveWhite	live recording	3:27	2004
"Decay [The Symptoms of Kali Yuga]"	White2 (vinyl edition bonus track)		17:38	2004
"Decay2 [Nihil's Maw]"	White2		25:18	2004
"Descent/Ascent"	Agharti Live 09-10	live recording	18:29	2011
"Defeating: Earth's Gravity"	The Grimmrobe Demos		14:59	1999
"Dream Canyon"	Shut It Down	Life Metal outtake	6:48	2020
"Dylan Carlson"	The Grimmrobe Demos		21:30	1999
"Dysnystaxis (...a Chance Meeting with Somnus)	Iron Soul of Nothing	remix by Nurse with Wound; initially on ØØ Void bonus disc	19:00	2011
"E)))"	НЕЖИТЬ: живьём в России	live recording	17:59	2016
"End of the Rising"	Metal Swim 2	Life Metal outtake	10:51	2019
"Eternal Return"	Terrestrials	collaboration with Ulver	14:09	2014
"Eternal Return (Rough 2009)"	Terrestrials (Japanese bonus disc)	collaboration with Ulver	14:05	2014
"Etna"	Altar	collaboration with Boris	9:51	2006
"Evil Chuck"	"Evil Chuck" / "Ron G Warrior"		5:43	2023
"F)))"	НЕЖИТЬ: живьём в России	live recording	13:58	2016
"Fetish" ("Fetish (Flip'n'Zip)" on vinyl edition)	Soused	collaboration with Scott Walker	9:08	2014
"Fidelio (Experiment 2009)"	Terrestrials (Japanese bonus disc)	collaboration with Ulver	11:42	2014
"Fried Eagle Mind"	Altar	collaboration with Boris	9:47	2006
"Frost (C)"	Pyroclasts		10:56	2019
"Funerældrone // Funerælmarch (To the Grave)"	LiveWhite	live recording	17:12	2004
"F.W.T.B.T."	Flight of the Behemoth	re-interpretation of Metallica's "For Whom the Bell Tolls"	10:19	2002
"The Gates of Ballard"	White1		15:32	2003
"Grease Fire"	LiveWhite	live recording	3:15	2004
"Grimm & Bear It"	The Grimmrobe Demos (CD re-issue bonus track)		16:40	2005
"H&G (Foraging)"	Agharti Live 09-10	live recording	6:20	2011
"Hallow-Cave"	La Mort Noir dans Esch/Alzette	live recording	21:58	2006
"Helio)))sophist"	Oracle (bonus disc)		46:17	2007
"Hell-O)))-Ween"	White2		14:11	2004
"Hell-O)))-Ween"	LiveWhite	live recording	9:13	2004
"Her Lips Were Wet With Venom"	Altar (bonus disc)	collaboration with Boris	28:14	2006
"Herod 2014"	Soused	collaboration with Scott Walker	11:59	2014
"Holy Water"	Rehearsal Demo Nov 11 2011		9:34	2012
"Hunting & Gathering (Cydonia)"	Monoliths & Dimensions		10:02	2009
"Intone"	LiveWhite	live recording	2:54	2004
"Invisible / Sleeper"	LA Reh 012		20:26	2014
"Isengard (Chopped & Screwed)"	Does Your Cat Know My Dog?		6:52	2010
"It Took the Night to Believe"	Black One		5:56	2005
"Kannon 1"	Kannon		12:50	2015
"Kannon 2"	Kannon		9:10	2015
"Kannon 3"	Kannon		11:26	2015
"Kingdoms (G)"	Pyroclasts		11:04	2019
"Last One / Valentine's Day"	LA Reh 012		18:02	2014
"Let There Be Light"	Terrestrials	collaboration with Ulver	11:27	2014
"The Libations of Samhain"	LXNDXN Subcamden Underworld Hallo'Ween 2003	live recording	48:59	2004
"Live at Gabah: The Anti Club 1.999"	The Grimmrobe Demos // Extended	live recording	25:47	2013
"Lullaby"	Soused	collaboration with Scott Walker	9:22	2014
"Masks the Ætmospheres"	Dømkirke	live recording	15:15	2008
"Mocking Solemnity"	Flight of the Behemoth		9:12	2002
"My Wall"	White1		25:16	2003
"N.L.T."	Altar	collaboration with Boris	3:49	2006
"NN O)))"	ØØ Void		15:15	2000
"NN)))"	LiveWhite	live recording	7:53	2004
"Novæ"	Life Metal		25:24	2019
"Orakulum"	Oracle		18:37	2007
"Orthodox Caveman"	Black One		10:02	2005
"Orthodox Caveman"	La Mort Noir dans Esch/Alzette	live recording	6:15	2006
"O))) Bow 1"	Flight of the Behemoth	collaboration with Merzbow	5:54	2002
"O))) Bow 2"	Flight of the Behemoth	collaboration with Merzbow	12:53	2002
"O))) Bow 3"	Flight of the Behemoth (Japanese bonus disc)	collaboration with Merzbow; live recording	23:45	2007
"O))) Bow 4"	Flight of the Behemoth (Japanese bonus disc)	collaboration with Merzbow; live recording	24:20	2007
"Peacock Angel"	Rehearsal Demo Nov 11 2011		10:43	2012
"Power Nurse"	Rehearsal Demo Nov 11 2011		15:55	2012
"Pyroclasts C#"	Metta, Benevolence	live recording	15:10	2021
"Pyroclasts F"	Metta, Benevolence	live recording	14:13	2021
"Ra at Dawn Part One (Rapture, at Last)	Iron Soul of Nothing	remix by Nurse with Wound; initially on ØØ Void bonus disc	14:59	2011
"Ra at Dawn Part Two (Numbed by Her Light)	Iron Soul of Nothing	remix by Nurse with Wound; initially on ØØ Void bonus disc	14:16	2011
"Ra at Dusk"	ØØ Void		14:43	2000
"Rabbits' Revenge"	ØØ Void	originally by Melvins	14:01	2000
"Reptile Lux"	La Mort Noir dans Esch/Alzette	live recording	13:26	2006
"Richard"	ØØ Void		14:32	2000
"Ron G Warrior"	"Evil Chuck" / "Ron G Warrior"		5:47	2023
"Room 206 pt.1 / Room 206 pt.2 / B-Witch"	Downtown LA Rehearsal / Rifftape March 1998		13:36	2018
"Room 206 pt.3 / The Grimm Robe/Black Wedding / Mustaine/Thorns / M&D I.L.F. / The DJs"	Downtown LA Rehearsal / Rifftape March 1998		19:25	2018
"Rule the Divine (Mysteria Caelestis Mugivi)"	Cro-Monolithic Remixes for an Iron Age	remix of "Teeth of Lions Rule the Divine" by Earth	15:58	2004
"Sending Pearl of Light"	Kannon (Japanese bonus track)	alternate mix of "Kannon 1"	12:52	2015
"She Played Such Music, Flowers Blossomed"	Kannon (Japanese bonus track)	alternate mix of "Kannon 2"	9:11	2015
"Sin Nanna"	Black One		2:19	2005
"The Sinking Belle (Black Sheep)"	Altar (Japanese edition)	collaboration with Boris	5:05	2006
"The Sinking Belle (Blue Sheep)"	Altar	collaboration with Boris	7:37	2006
"The Sinking Belle (White Sheep)"	Altar (Japanese edition)	collaboration with Boris	4:36	2006
"Space Bacon Tractor"	LiveWhite	live recording	10:04	2004
"Sunn O))) Vs Diggers 4th November 2003"	LXNDXN Subcamden Underworld Hallo'Ween 2003	live recording	16:05	2004
"Troubled Air"	Life Metal		11:46	2019
"Troubled Air"	Metta, Benevolence	live recording	31:46	2021
"Untitled"	(初心) Grimmrobes Live 101008	live recording	46:00	2009
"Untitled"	(初心) Grimmrobes Live 101008	live recording	46:05	2009
"Veils It White"	Veils It White	reinterpretation of Flight of the Behemoth material	21:14	2003
"Vlad Tepes"	Solstitium Fulminate	live recording; Black One bonus disc	16:43	2005
"Western Horn"	Terrestrials	collaboration with Ulver	9:37	2014
"Why Dost Thou Hide Thyself in Clouds?"	Dømkirke	live recording	15:08	2008
"Wyoming Big Sky"	25th Anniversary Rehearsal Demo LP		18:53	2023
"Wine & Fog"	Solstitium Fulminate	live recording; Black One bonus disc	21:29	2005
"青木ヶ原 // 樹海" ("Aokigahara // Jukai")	"青木ヶ原 // 樹海"	initially released as Kannon bonus track	6:00	2016
