= Southern Lord Records discography =

Southern Lord Records is an American independent record label founded by Greg Anderson in 1998. The Los Angeles–based label was initially formed "just to put out" the debut albums by Thorr's Hammer and Burning Witch. These bands were among the first collaborations between Anderson and Stephen O'Malley, who also formed Sunn O))), one of the label's biggest selling acts along with Japanese band Boris.

The underground label also found bigger sales with releases by side projects of mainstream artists, such as Dave Grohl's Probot and Josh Homme's The Desert Sessions, volumes 7 & 8. Southern Lord's discography is diverse, and consists of albums by experimental metal bands Earth, Goatsnake and Khanate, as well as releases from black metal acts like Wolves in the Throne Room and Striborg.

== Catalog ==
This list is organized by catalog number, a roughly chronological number system established by the label and typically printed on or assigned to each official release. However, unlike many record labels with similar systems, smaller releases such as singles, split albums, and co-releases with other labels have often been assigned a catalog number using a decimal.

No.	Artist	Title	Year	Format
00	Various Artists	Let There Be Doom	2002	CD-R
000	Various Artists	Let There Be Doom II (A Kult Collection of Massive Sub-Harmonics)	2004	CD-R
1	Thorr's Hammer	Dommedagsnatt	1998	CD, LP
2	Burning Witch	Crippled Lucifer	1998	CD, 2×CD
3	The Obsessed	Incarnate	1999	CD, 2×LP
4	Electric Wizard	Supercoven	2000	CD
5	Goatsnake	Dog Days	2000	LP
6	The Want	Greatest Hits, Vol. 5	2000	CD
7	Mondo Generator	Cocaine Rodeo	2000	CD
8	Internal Void	Unearthed	2000	CD
8.5	Paul Chain / Internal Void	"Full Moon Improvisation" / "Window to Hell"	2000	7"
9	Warhorse	As Heaven Turns to Ash...	2001	CD, 2×LP
9.5	Cathedral	"Gargoylian"	2001	7"
10	Boris	Absolutego+ (Special Low Frequency Version)	2001	CD
10.5	Spiritual Beggars / Grand Magus	"It's Over" / "Twilight Train"	2001	7"
11	Church of Misery	Master of Brutality	2001	CD
11.5	The Obsessed / The Mystic Crewe of Clearlight	Untitled split album	2001	7"
12	The Desert Sessions	Desert Sessions, Vols. 7 & 8	2001	CD
12.5	Mark D.	"5 Skull Bake" b/w "El Morocco"	2002	7"
13	Goatsnake	Flower of Disease	2001	LP
13.5	Unearthly Trance	"Lord Humanless Awake" b/w "Summoning the Beast"	2001	7"
14	Khanate	Khanate	2001	CD, LP
14.5	Place of Skulls	Place of Skulls	2002	7"
15	Sunn O)))	Flight of the Behemoth	2002	CD
15.5	Warhorse	"I Am Dying"	2002	7"
16	Place of Skulls	Nailed	2002	CD
17	Teeth of Lions Rule the Divine	Rampton	2002	CD
18	Spaceboy	Searching the Stone Library for the Green Page of Illusion	2002	CD
19	Earthride	Taming of the Demons	2002	CD
19.5	Dukes of Nothing	"Half Evil" b/w "Bastard Son"	2002	7"
20	Sourvein	Will to Mangle	2002	CD
21	Darkest Hour	The Mark of the Judas	2003	LP
22	Grief	Turbulent Times	2002	CD
23	Toadliquor	The Hortator's Lament	2003	CD
24	Boris	Amplifier Worship	2003	CD
25	Sunn O)))	White1	2003	CD, LP
25.5	Loincloth	"Church Burntings"	2003	7"
26	Attila Csihar	The Beast of Attila Csihar	2003	CD
26.5	Orcustus	World Dirtnap	2003	7"
27	Place of Skulls	With Vision	2003	CD, LP
27.5	Outlaw Order	Legalize Crime	2003	7"
28	Khanate	Things Viral	2003	CD
28.5	Thee Plague of Gentleman	Thee Plague of Gentleman	2004	7"
29	Tangorodrim	Unholy and Unlimited	2003	LP
29.5	Graves at Sea	"Cirrhosis" b/w "Atavist Arise"	2004	7"
30	Probot	Probot	2004	CD, 2×LP
30.5	Probot	"Centuries of Sin" b/w "The Emerald Law"	2003	7"
31	Sunn O)))	White2	2004	CD, 2×LP
31.5	Eyehategod / Cripple Bastards	"I Am the Gestapo" / "Self-Zeroing"	2004	7"
32	Saint Vitus	V	2004	CD, LP
32.5	Mord	Unholy Inquisition	2004	7"
33	Goatsnake	Trampled Under Hoof	2004	CD, LP
34	Goatsnake	1 + Dog Days	2004	CD
35	Lair of the Minotaur	Carnage	2004	CD
36	The Hidden Hand	Mother Teacher Destroyer	2004	CD, 2×LP
36.5	Sunn O)))	Cro-Monolithic Remixes for an Iron Age	2004	12"
37	Sunn O)))	The Grimmrobe Demos	2005	CD, 2×LP
37.5	Sunn O)))	(初心) Grimmrobes Live 101008	2009	Cassette
38	Urgehal	Through Thick Fog Til' Death	2004	CD
39	Thrones	Day Late, Dollar Short	2005	CD, 2×LP
40	Earth	Legacy of Dissolution	2005	2×LP
41	Boris	Akuma no Uta	2005	CD, PLP
42	Nortt / Xasthur	Hedengang / A Curse for the Lifeless	2005	CD, LP
42.5	Nachtmystium	Eulogy IV	2005	CD
43	Saint Vitus	Live	2005	CD, 2×LP
44	Xasthur	Nocturnal Poisoning	2005	2×LP
45	Repulsion	Horrified	2006	2×12"
45.5	Lurker of Chalice	Lurker of Chalice	2005	CD, 2×LP
46	Oren Ambarchi	Triste	2005	CD
46.5	Frost	Frost	2005	7", CD
47	Twilight	Twilight	2005	CD, LP
47.5	Haemoth	Kontamination	2005	CD
48	Earth	Hex; Or Printing in the Infernal Method	2005	CD, 2×LP
49	Lair of the Minotaur	Cannibal Massacre	2005	7", CD
49.5	Deathspell Omega	Kénôse	2005	CD
50	Sunn O)))	Black One	2005	CD, 2×LP
50.5	Sunn O)))	Black One/Solstitium Fulminate	2005	2×CD
51	Earthride	Vampire Circus	2005	CD, LP
52	The Hidden Hand	Devoid of Colour	2005	CD + DVD
52.5	Nattefrost	Nekronaut	2005	LP
53	Urgehal	Goatcraft Torment	2006	CD
53.5	Orcustus	Wrathrash	2005	7"
54	Craft	Fuck the Universe	2006	CD
54.5	Leviathan / Sapthuran	Leviathan / Sapthuran	2006	CD
55	Boris	Pink	2005	CD, 2×LP
56	Lair of the Minotaur	The Ultimate Destroyer	2006	CD, LP
56.6	Nachtmystium	Instinct: Decay	2006	CD
57	Confessor	Unraveled	2006	12"
57.5	Zoroaster	Zoroaster	2006	CD
58	Mord	Christendom Perished	2006	CD
58.1	Stebmo	Stebmo	2008	CD
58.5	Leviathan / Xasthur	Leviathan / Xasthur	2006	CD
59	Grief	Alive	2006	CD
60	Striborg	Embittered Darkness/Isle De Morts	2006	CD, 2×LP
61	Oren Ambarchi	Grapes from the Estate	2006	2×LP
61.5	Katharsis	VVorldVVithoutEnd	2006	CD
62	Sunn O))) and Boris	Altar	2006	CD, 2×CD, 3×LP
62.5	Antaeus	Blood Libels	2006	CD
63	Clown Alley	Circus of Chaos	2006	CD
63.5	Deathspell Omega	Si Monumentum Requires, Circumspice	2006	CD
64	—	—	—	—
64.5	Funeral Mist	Salvation	2006	CD
65	Leviathan	The Blind Wound	2006	LP
65.5	Funeral Mist	Devilry	2006	CD
66.6	Sunn O)))	La Mort Noir dans Esch/Alzette	2006	
66.60	Sunn O))) and Earth	Angel Coma	2006	LP
67	Velvet Cacoon	Genevieve	2007	CD, 2×LP
67.5	Mark Deutrom	Iraq	2006	CD
68	Velvet Cacoon	Northsuite	2007	2×LP
68.5	Obscurus Advocam	Verbia Daemonicus	2007	CD
69	Orthodox	Gran Poder	2007	CD, 2×LP
69.5	Secrets of the Moon	Antithesis	2007	CD
70	The Hidden Hand	The Resurrection of Whiskey Foote	2007	CD, 2×CD
71	Stephen O'Malley and Z'EV	Magistral	2007	CD
71.5	Mortuus	De Contemplanda Morte	2007	CD
72	Gravetemple	The Holy Down	2007	CD
72.5	Watain	Sworn to the Dark	2007	CD
73	Striborg	Nefaria	2007	CD, 2×LP
73.5	Final Warning	PDX	2007	CD
74	Earth	Hibernaculum	2007	CD + DVD, LP
74.2	Earth	Live Europe 2006	2007	CD
74.5	Deathspell Omega	Fas - Ite, Maledicti, in Ignem Aeternum	2007	CD
75	Abruptum	Evil Genius	2007	CD, 12"
76	Asbestosdeath	Dejection, Unclean	2007	CD, 10"
77	Sunn O)))	Oracle	2007	2×CD, LP
78	Oren Ambarchi	In the Pendulum's Embrace	2007	
78.5	Scurshahor / Striborg	Scursashor / Striborg	2007	7"
79	Wolves in the Throne Room	Diadem of 12 Stars	2007	2×LP
80	Burial Chamber Trio	Burial Chamber Trio	2007	LP
81	Glorior Belli	Manifesting the Raging Beast	2007	CD, LP
82	Weedeater	God Luck and Good Speed	2007	CD, LP
83	Wolves in the Throne Room	Two Hunters	2007	CD, 2×LP
84	Orthodox	Amanecer En Puerta Oscura	2007	CD
85	Tangorodrim	Justus Ex Fide Vivit	2007	CD
86	Om	Pilgrimage	2007	CD, LP
86.5	Om	Live at Jerusalem	2008	LP
87	Burial Chamber Trio	WVRM	2007	10"
88	Boris with Merzbow	Rock Dream	2007	2×CD, 3×LP
89	Jesse Sykes and the Sweet Hereafter	Like, Love, Lust and the Open Halls of the Soul	2008	2×LP
90	Earth	The Bees Made Honey in the Lion's Skull	2008	CD, 2×LP
90.5	Earth / Sir Richard Bishop	"The Peacock Angels Lament" / "Narasimha"	2008	12"
91	Lair of the Minotaur	War Metal Battle Master	2008	CD, LP
92	Boris	Smile	2008	CD, 2×LP
92.5	Boris	"Statement"	2008	7"
93	Ascend	Ample Fire Within	2008	CD
93.5	Coffins	Buried Death	2008	CD
94	Sunn O)))	Dømkirke	2008	2×LP
95	Pentemple	O))) Presents...	2008	CD, LP
96	Gore	Heart Gore/Mean Mans' Dream	2008	2×CD, 2×LP
97	Thou	Tyrant	2009	LP
98	The Iceburn Collective	The Power of the Lion	2009	2×LP
98.5	Ofermod	Tiamtu	2009	CD
99	Wino	Punctuated Equilibrium	2009	CD, LP + 10"
99.5	Deathspell Omega	Veritas Diaboli Manet in Aeternum: Chaining the Katechon	2009	CD
100	Sunn O)))	Monoliths & Dimensions	2009	CD, 2×LP
101	Wolves in the Throne Room	Malevolent Grain	2009	
101.5	Funeral Mist	Maranatha	2009	CD
102	Orcustus	Orcustus	2009	CD
103	Wolves in the Throne Room	Black Cascade	2009	CD, 2×LP
104	Earth	Radio/Live (2007–2008)	2009	LP
105	Pelican	Ephemeral	2009	12"
106	Eagle Twin	The Unkindness of Crows	2009	CD
107	The Accüsed	The Curse of Martha Splatterhead	2009	CD, 12"
108.1	Boris	Japanese Heavy Rock Hits, Vol. 1	2009	7"
108.2	Boris	Japanese Heavy Rock Hits, Vol. 2	2009	7"
108.3	Boris	Japanese Heavy Rock Hits, Vol. 3	2009	7"
108.4	Boris	Japanese Heavy Rock Hits, Vol. 4	2009	7"
109	Black Cobra	Chronomega	2009	CD
110	Pelican	What We All Come to Need	2009	CD + DVD, 2xLP
111	Black Breath	Razor to Oblivion	2009	CD
112	Virulence	If This Isn't a Dream... 1985–1989	2010	CD
113	Twilight	Monument to Time End	2010	CD
114	Black Breath	Heavy Breathing	2010	CD, LP
115	Trap Them	Filth Rations	2010	LP
116	Goatsnake	Flower of Disease	2010	LP / CD
117	YOB	The Great Cessation	2010	LP
118	Masakari	The Profit Feeds	2010	CD
119	Thou	Summit	2010	LP
120	Boris & Ian Astbury	BXI	2010	12", CD
121	The Secret	Solve et coagula	2010	CD, LP
122	Earth	A Bureaucratic Desire for Extra-Capsular Extraction	2010	CD, 2×LP
123	Boris	Live in Japan	2010	DVD
124	Winter	Into Darkness	2011	CD, LP
125	Nihilist	Carnal Leftovers	2011	LP + 7"
125.5	Righteous Fool	"Forever Flames / Edict of Worms"	2010	7"
126	Corrosion of Conformity	"Your Tomorrow"	2010	7"
126.5	Lebanon	"Overdose / Overload"	2010	7"
127	Nails	Unsilent Death	2010	CD, LP+LP clear vinyl, T-shirt
127.5	Baptists	Baptists	2010	7"
128	Earth	Angels of Darkness, Demons of Light I	2011	CD, 2×LP
128.5	Off!	"Compared to What / Rotten Apple"	2011	7", T-shirt
129	Weedeater	Jason... The Dragon	2011	CD, LP
130	All Pigs Must Die	God Is War	2011	CD, 2×CD, LP
130.5	Dead in the Dirt	Fear	2011	7"
131	Early Graves	Goner	2011	LP
132	Summon the Crows	One More for the Gallows	2011	CD
133	Misantropic	Insomnia	2011	CD
134	Drainland	And So Our Troubles Began	2011	CD
135	Acephalix	Interminable Night	2011	CD
136	Alpinist	Lichtlærm / Minus.Mensch	2011	CD
137	Seven Sisters of Sleep	Seven Sisters of Sleep	2011	CD
138	Xibalba	Madre mia gracias por los dias	2011	CD
139	Planks	The Darkest of Grays / Solicit to Fall	2011	CD
140	Sarabante	Remnants	2011	CD
141	Balaclava	Crimes of Faith	2011	CD
142	Wolves in the Throne Room	Celestial Lineage	2011	CD, 2×LP, CS, T-shirt
143	Noothgrush	Live for Nothing	2011	CD, 2×LP, T-shirt
144	Heartless	Hell Is Other People	2011	CD, LP
145	Craft	Void	2011	CD, 2×LP, T-shirt
146	Black Cobra	Invernal	2011	CD, LP, T-shirt
147	Loincloth	Iron Balls of Steel	2011	CD, LP, T-shirt
148	Fontanelle	Vitamin F	2012	CD, LP
149	Earth	Angels of Darkness, Demons of Light II	2012	CD, LP
151	Nails	Obscene Humanity	2013	7"
152	Wolfbrigade	Damned	2012	CD, LP, T-shirt
154	Black Breath	Sentenced To Life	2012	CD, LP, T-shirt
155	Pelican	Ataraxia/Taraxis	2012	CD, LP, T-shirt
156	Acephalix	Deathless Master	2012	CD
157	Eagle Twin	Feather Tipped the Serpent Scale	2013	CD, LP
159	Xibalba	Hasta La Muerte	2013	CD, LP
160	Martyrdöd	Paranoia	2012	CD, T-shirt
161	Burning Love	Rotten thing to say	2012	CD, T-shirt
162	From Ashes Rise	From Ashes Rise	2013	7"
163	Enabler	All Hail The Void	2013	CD
164	High on Fire	Art of Self Defense	2013	CD, LP
165	Kromosom	Live Forever	2013	CD
166	Poison Idea	Fatal Erection Years	2013	CD, LP
167	Oiltanker	Shadow of Greed/Crusades	2013	CD
168	Nuclear Death Terror	Chaos Reigns	2013	CD
169	The Secret	Agnus Dei	2013	CD, LP
170	Baptists	Bushcraft	2013	CD, LP
171	Wartorn	An Iconic Nightmare	2013	CD, LP
172	Nails	Abandon All Life	2013	CD, LP
173	Hessian	Manégarmr	2013	CD, LP
174	Agrimonia	Rites of Separation	2013	CD, 2×LP
175	Power Trip	Manifest Decimation	2013	CD, LP
176	Dead In The Dirt	The Blind Hole	2013	CD, LP
177	All Pigs Must Die	Nothing Violates This Nature	2013	CD, LP
177	Sunn O)))	Rehearsal Demo Nov 11 2011	2012	LP
178	Centuries	Taedium Vitae	2013	CD, LP
181	A Storm of Light	Nations To Flames	2013	CD, LP
182	Pelican	Forever Becoming	2013	CD, LP
189	Bl'ast!	Blood!	2013	CD, LP
300	Sunn O)))	Life Metal	2019	CD, 2xLP
666	Pentagram	Sub-Basement	2001	CD
777	Various Artists	Resurrection	2009	CD

"—" denotes unassigned catalog numbers.
