= Greg Anderson (guitarist) =

American musician (born 1970)

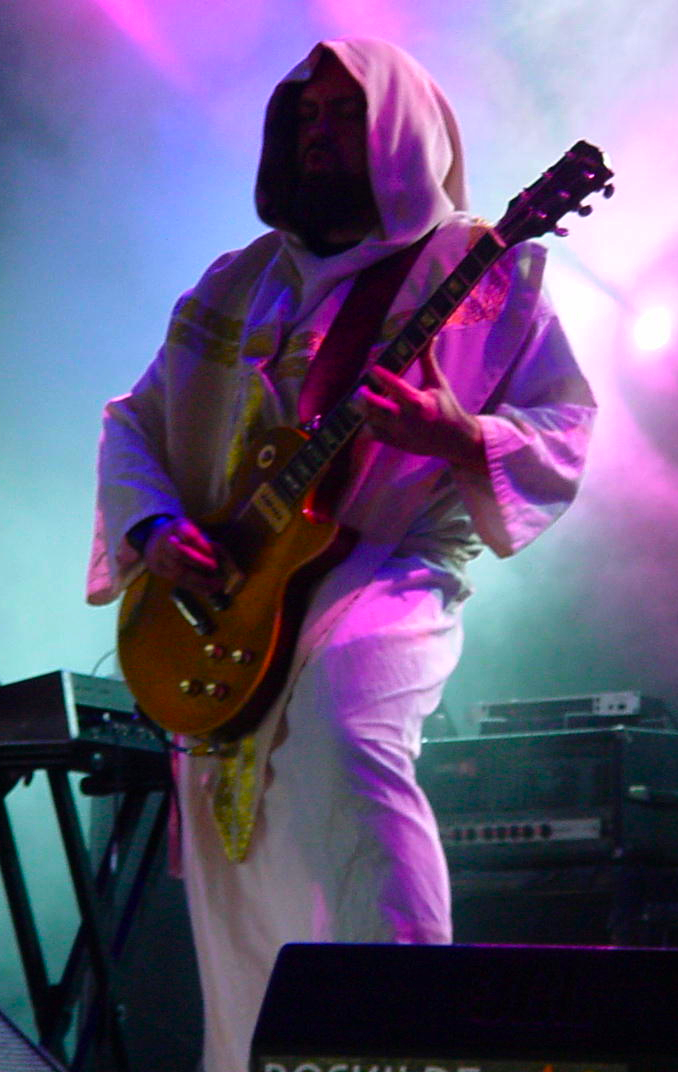
- Anderson performing with Sunn O))) in 2005

Background information
- Born: 1970 (age 55–56)
- Origin: Seattle, Washington, U.S.
- Genres: Doom metal, avant-garde metal, hardcore punk
- Instruments: Guitar, bass
- Years active: 1980s–present
- Label: Southern Lord Records
- Website: www.southernlord.com

Greg Anderson (born 1970) is an American musician, a co-founder of Southern Lord Records.

Anderson is the guitarist of stoner doom band Goatsnake, but is also well known for his collaborations with Stephen O'Malley. Together, the duo participated in projects such as the short-lived death/doom metal band Thorr's Hammer, the extreme doom metal band Burning Witch (although Anderson left before the band could record an album), as well as the drone metal bands Sunn O))) and Teeth of Lions Rule the Divine.

== Career ==
Earlier in his career, Anderson was involved with the straight edge hardcore punk bands False Liberty, Brotherhood, Amenity, Statement, Galleon's Lap, and the Revelation Records and indie rock/hardcore punk band Engine Kid.

Around 1994 and 1995 while still playing with Engine Kid, he met Stephen O'Malley, and they joined the Seattle death-doom band Thorr's Hammer. Their singer Runhild Gammelsæter was a Norwegian exchange student studying at the University of Washington. The band split after she went back to Norway, but Anderson and O'Malley still played with drummer Jamie Sykes to form Burning Witch.

Scott "Wino" Weinrich had left The Obsessed in 1995, effectively dissolving the band. Its rhythm section were still looking for someone to play with, when they saw Engine Kid, which Anderson was a member of, in Los Angeles. The other Obsessed members wanted to jam with Anderson, whose taste in music was getting heavier over time. Anderson and the group experimented with hardcore punk, and blues rock inspired by the Allman Brothers Band and Lynyrd Skynyrd, but wanted to play in a doom metal direction from the likes of Eyehategod and Disembowelment. This jamming resulted in Goatsnake being formed, who released one album each in 1999 and 2000, and a third in 2015.

Both Brotherhood and Galleon's Lap featured future Foo Fighters and Sunny Day Real Estate bass player Nate Mendel. In 2007, Greg joined Attila Csihar and Oren Ambarchi in a new drone-doom project called Burial Chamber Trio, as well as Ascend, a current project/record with Gentry Densley, the former singer-guitarist of Revelation Records band Iceburn.

In April 1998, Anderson and O'Malley founded the independent, underground label Southern Lord Records, based in Los Angeles, California. The company has been specializing in doom, sludge, drone, experimental metal, left-field black metal, and crust punk. Anderson has been serving as the label's music curator.

While working with Sunn O))), Anderson sometimes credited himself as "The Lord", and under the same pseudonym recorded two benefit tracks; "We Who Walk In Light" (2021) with Alice in Chains' vocalist William Duvall raising funds for "Jail Guitar Doors", and "Needle Cast" with Big Brave's Robin Wattie benefiting "The Native Women Shelter of Montreal". Around the same time, he was involved in a production of a score for an anthology of found-footage horror stories called "V/H/S 94".

In 2022, Anderson released his solo debut Forest Nocturne under the name "The Lord", drawing inspiration from "hikes in the woodlands of the Pacific Northwest" and the notion about trees as "perhaps the last known connection that we have to an ancient world". Attila Csihar provided guest vocals on the album. "Triumph of the Oak" was released as the first single.

== Discography ==
=== With False Liberty ===
- The Zoo Is Free (Demo 1986)
- Silence Is Consent... 7" (EP 1986)

=== With Brotherhood ===
- Brotherhood of Friends (1988)
- Words Run... As Thick As Blood (1989)

=== With Amenity ===
- Chula Vista (Demo 1989)

=== With Statement ===
- Don't Sacrifice Me 7" (EP 1989)

=== With Galleons Lap ===
- Themes And Variations (1991)

=== With Engine Kid ===
- Engine Kid (EP 1992)
- Astronaut (EP 1993)
- Bear Catching Fish (CD and LP 1993)
- The Little Drummer Boy/In The Bleak Midwinter (split with Silkworm 1993)
- Three On The Tree (split with Wreck 1994)
- Iceburn/Engine Kid (split CD with Iceburn 1994)
- Angel Wings (CD 1995)
- Troubleman Unlimited (EP 1995)

=== With Thorr's Hammer ===
- Sannhet i Blodet (Demo 1995)
- Dommedagsnatt (Cassette 1996, CD 1998, CD Reissue 2004, Picture Disc 2004)

=== With Goatsnake ===
- IV 7" (EP 1998)
- Man Of Light 7" (EP 1998)
- Goatsnake Vol. 1 (CD 1999)
- Goatsnake/Burning Witch (split with Burning Witch) (CD 2000)
- Dog Days (CD 2000)
- Flower of Disease (2000)
- Trampled Under Hoof (CD 2004)
- 1 + Dog Days (CD 2004)
- "Black Age Blues" (CD 2016)

=== With Sunn O))) ===
- The Grimmrobe Demos (demo 1998, CD 2000, 2xPLP 2003, 2xLP 2004)
- ØØ Void (2000)
- Flight of the Behemoth (2002)
- White1 (2003)
- White2 (2004)
- Black One (2005)
- Altar (Collaboration with Boris, CD 2006)
- Oracle (2007)
- Dømkirke (live 2xLP 2008)
- Monoliths & Dimensions (2009)
- Terrestrials (collaboration with Ulver, February 2014)
- Soused (collaboration with Scott Walker, October 2014)
- Kannon (2015)
- Life Metal (2019)
- Pyroclasts (2019)

=== With Teeth of Lions Rule the Divine ===
- Rampton (2002)

=== With Burial Chamber Trio ===
- Burial Chamber Trio (LP 2007)
- WVRM 10" (Live EP 2008)

=== With Ascend ===
- Ample Fire Within (2008)

=== With Pentemple ===
- Sunn O))) Presents… (Live album, 2008)

=== With The Lord ===
- Forest Nocturne (2022)
- Devotional (collaboration with Petra Haden, 2022)
- Worship: Bernard Herrmann Tribute LP (2024)
