= Stephen O'Malley =

American musician

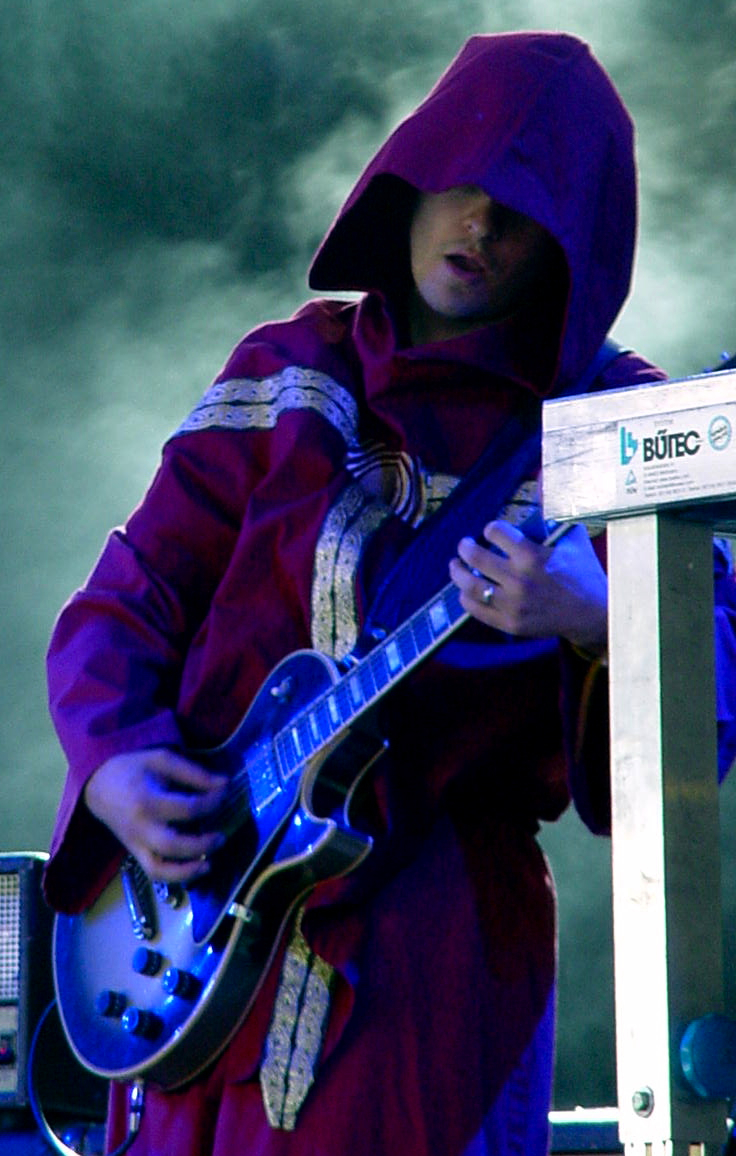
- O'Malley performing with Sunn O))) in 2005

Background information
- Born: July 15, 1974 (age 51)
- Origin: Seattle, Washington, U.S.
- Genres: Drone metal; doom metal; experimental metal; dark ambient
- Occupations: Musician; composer; art director; graphic designer
- Instruments: Guitar; bass guitar; piano; synthesizer
- Years active: 1993–present
- Labels: Southern Lord; Aurora Borealis; Editions Mego; Hydra Head; Sub Rosa; VHF
- Spouse: Kali Malone (m. 2023)
- Website: www.stephenomalley.com

Stephen O'Malley (sometimes referred to as SOMA; born July 15, 1974) is an American guitarist, producer, composer, and visual artist from Seattle, Washington, who has conceptualized and participated in numerous drone metal, doom metal, and experimental music bands, most notably Sunn O))).

== Biography ==
O'Malley is a founding member of several bands including Sunn O))) (1998–present), Thorr's Hammer (1994–1995), Burning Witch (1995–1998), KTL (2005–2021), and Khanate (2000–2006). Within these projects and alone, he has collaborated with a variety of musical artists, including Greg Anderson, Scott Walker, Merzbow, Eyvind Kang, Alan Moore, Iancu Dumitrescu, Ana-Maria Avram, Alvin Lucier, F.M. Einheit, Randall Dunn, James Plotkin, Julian Cope, Joe Preston, Attila Csihar, Stuart Dempster, Mika Vainio, Peter Rehberg, Lee Dorian, Thurston Moore, Jóhann Jóhannsson, Nurse With Wound, Boris, Michio Kurihara, Jim O'Rourke, Keiji Haino, Daniel O'Sullivan & Kristoffer Rygg (in the free improvisation act Æthenor together with Vincent de Roguin and Steve Noble), Aaron Turner, David Tibet, Oren Ambarchi, Alexander Tucker, Z'EV, and more recently with Senyawa, Félicia Atkinson, Kali Malone, and François J. Bonnet.

O'Malley also produced work together with the Franco-Austrian choreographer and director Gisèle Vienne on the pieces Kindertotenlieder (2007), Jerk (2008), Eternelle Idole (2009), This Is How You Will Disappear (2010), Last Spring: A Prequel (2011), The Pyre (2013) and L'Etang (2021). He has also worked with American sculptor Banks Violette (various projects between 2005–2009), the Italian performance artist Nico Vascellari (2007–2011), Swiss art collective KLAT (2009), and the Belgian film maker Alexis Destoop (Kairos with Oren Ambarchi, 2010).

O'Malley has designed record covers since the early 1990s for groups such as Earth, Burzum, Emperor, Mayhem, Gehenna, Boris, Dissection, Oneohtrix Point Never, and Cathedral. He has also worked as a rock/metal music journalist & published a black metal fanzine called Descent in the 1990s. He was involved with creation of both the Southern Lord label and the experimental/neofolk/black metal label The Ajna Offensive. In 2011, he began curating and art directing the Ideologic Organ record label, in association with the Viennese Editions Mego.

== Personal life ==
Although he is originally from Seattle, Washington, he lives in Paris, France.

O'Malley is married to American composer and organist Kali Malone, which they announced jointly on Instagram in July 2023.

== Discography ==
=== With Sunn O))) ===
- The Grimmrobe Demos (demo 1998, CD 2000, 2xPLP 2003, 2xLP 2004, 3xPLP 2008)
- ØØ Void (CD 2000, 2xLP 2003, CD & 2LP 2011)
- Flight of the Behemoth (CD & 2xLP 2002)
- White1 (CD & 2xLP 2003)
- Veils It White (12" 2003)
- The Libations of Samhain (live CD 2003)
- Live Action Sampler (promotional mix 2xCD 2004)
- Live White (live 2xCD 2004)
- White2 (CD & 2xLP 2004)
- Cro-Monolithic Remixes for an Iron Age (12" 2004)
- Candlewolf of the Golden Chalice (12" 2005)
- Black One (CD 2005, 2xLP 2006)
- Black One & Solstitium Fulminate (2xCD 2005)
- AngelComa (split LP 2006)
- La Mort Noir dans Esch/Alzette (CD 2006)
- WHITEbox (4xLP Box 2006)
- Altar (CD 2006)
- Oracle (12" 2007)
- Dømkirke (live 2xLP 2008)
- Che (with Pan Sonic) (10" 2009)
- (初心) Grimmrobes Live 101008 (Cassette 2009)
- Monoliths & Dimensions (CD & 2xLP 2009)
- Agharthi Live 09-10 (LP + 7" 2011)
- The Iron Soul of Nothing (with Nurse With Wound) (2xLP 2011)
- Terrestrials (collaboration with Ulver, February 2014)
- Soused (collaboration with Scott Walker, October 2014)
- Kannon (CD & LP 2015)
- Life Metal (CD & 2xLP 2019)
- Pyroclasts (CD & 2xLP 2019)
- v/a The Beast of Attila Csihar "Decay: The Symptoms of Kali Yuga" (CD 2003)
- v/a Let There Be Doom II "Hell-O)))-Ween" (demo) (CD 2004)
- v/a Darkness Hath No Boundaries "It Took The Night To believe" (CD 2006)
- v/a Darkness Knows No Boundaries "Etna" (as Sunn O))) & Boris) (CD 2006)
- v/a Jukebox Buddha "BP//Simple" (CD 2006)
- v/a Within The Church of Thee Overlords "Orakulum (edit)" (CD 2007)
- v/a VISIONARE 53 SOUND "Ultra Orthodox Caveman" (4xPictureLP & 2xCD magazine 2007)
- v/a Does Your Cat Know My Dog? "Isengard (Chopped & Screwed)" (LP 2009)

=== With Khanate ===
- Khanate (CD & 12" 2001)
- Live WFMU 91.1 (CD 2002)
- No Joy (12" 2003)
- Things Viral (CD & 12" 2003)
- Let Loose the Lambs (DVD 2004)
- KHNT vs. Stockholm (CD 2004)
- Live Aktion Sampler 2004 (CD 2004)
- Capture & Release (CD, 12", picture disc 2005)
- Dead/Live Aktions (DVD 2005)
- It's Cold When Birds Fall from the Sky (CD 2005)
- Clean Hands Go Foul (LP & PLP 2008, CD Japan & CD+live DVD 2009)
- To Be Cruel (2023)

=== With Burning Witch ===
- Demo (cassette 1996)
- Rift.Canyon.Dreams (12" 1998)
- Towers... (12" 1998)
- Crippled Lucifer (CD 1998, cassette 1999, 2CD 2008)
- Burning Witch/Goatsnake split (CD 2000)
- Burning Witch/Asva split (12" picture disc 2004)
- Burning Witch (4xLP + DVD boxset 2012)

=== With Ginnungagap ===
- 1000% Downer (CD & 12" 2004)
- Return to Nothing (CD 2004, 12" 2008)
- Remeindre (CD & 12" 2005)
- Crashed like Wretched Moth (12" 2006)

=== With Lotus Eaters ===
- Alienist on a Pale Horse (CD & 12" 2001)
- Four Demonstrations (CD 2001)
- Mind Control for Infants (CD 2002, 2xLP 2009)
- DR-55 (7" 2002)
- Wurmwulv (CD 2007, 2xLP 2011)

=== With KTL ===
- KTL (CD & LP 2006 on Aurora Borealis)
- KTL 2 (CD & LP 2007 on Thrill Jockey)
- KTL 3 (CD & LP on OR 2007)
- Eine eiserne Faust in einem Samthandschuh (CD 2007 on Editions Mego) – limited to 300 copies
- KTL – Live in Krems (LP released in December '07 by Editions Mego)
- IKKI (CD 2008 on Editions Mego)
- Victor Sjöström's The Phantom Carriage: KTL Edition (DVD 2008, USA DVD 2011)
- KTL IV Paris Demos (CDR 2008)
- KTL 4 (CD 2009, 2x12" & 7" Japan 2009, CD Japan 2009)
- KTL V (CD 2012, 2xLP 2012)
- KTL V INA GRM Studies (12" 2012)

=== Solo works ===
- Fungal Hex (CD 2001, 2x12" picture disc 2005)
- Caveman Skull 1&2 (2xMP3CD 2004)
- Devolution/Evolution: Stephen O'Malley interviews Dylan Carlson (MP3 2005)
- Press Conference/Panel at Roskilde Festival 010705 (MP3 2006)
- Magistral (with Z'EV) (CD 2007)
- Salt (CD 2008)
- 6 °F Skyquake (with Attila Csihar) (CD 2008, Book & LP 2008)
- Keep an Eye Out (12" 2009)
- Petite Géante (Cassette on The Tapeworm, 2009)
- Cocon & Oiseau de Nuit (Cassette 2010, LP 2012)
- רומיאו (Cassette 2011, LP 2012)
- obscurantisme (2xCD & 2xLP 2012)
- "Epipsychidion" on the compilation Songs of Decadence: A Soundtrack to the Writings of Stanisław Przybyszewski (2013)
- Gruidés (LP DDS DDS013 2015)
- Eternelle Idole (2xLP 2015 Shelter Press)
- Fuck Fundamentalist Pigs (2xLP 2015 Ideologic Organ)
- Dread Live (LP 2016 Ideologic Organ)
- End Ground (LP 2016 Ideologic Organ)

=== With Grave Temple ===
- The Holy Down (CD 2007)
- Ambient/Ruin (demo CD 2008)
- Le Vampire de Paris (CD 2009)

=== With Æthenor ===
- Deep in Ocean Sunk the Lamp of Light (CD & LP 2007)
- Betimes Black Cloudmasses (CD & LP 2008)
- Faking Gold & Murder (CD & LP 2009)
- En Form for Blå (CD & 2xLP 2011)

=== With Nazoranai ===
- Nazoranai (CD & 2xLP 2012)
- The Most Painful Time Happens Only Once Has It Arrived Already...? (CD & 2xLP 2014)
- Beginning to Fall in Line Before Me, So Decorously, the Nature of All That Must Be Transformed (LP 2017)

=== Various ===
- Sarin – Nihilist (cassette 1996)
- Thorr's Hammer – Dommedagsnatt (cassette 1996, CD 1998, CD reissue 2004, picture disc 2004, gatefold LP 2009)
- Teeth of Lions Rule the Divine – Rampton (CD 2002)
- Pentemple – Sunn O))) Presents (CD & LP 2008)
- Brain Donor – Wasted Fuzz Excessive (CD 2009)
- Spaceship – Spaceship (CD 2009)
- Peeesseye – Robust Commercial Fucking Scream (Cassette 2009)
- Stephen O'Malley & Steve Noble – St Francis Duo (CD & 2xLP 2012)
- ÄÄNIPÄÄ – Through a Pre-Memory (CD & LP 2013)
