= Life Metal =

2019 album by Sunn O)))

Studio album by Sunn O)))
- Released: April 26, 2019
- Recorded: July 2018
- Studios: Electrical Audio (Chicago, Illinois)
- Genre: Drone metal
- Length: 68:56
- Label: Southern Lord (SUNN300)
- Producers: Greg Anderson, Stephen O'Malley

Sunn O))) chronology
Kannon (2015)	Life Metal (2019)	Pyroclasts (2019)

Life Metal is the eighth studio album by American drone metal band Sunn O))) on Southern Lord Records. The album received a limited release for Record Store Day on April 13, 2019, and a wide release two weeks later on April 26. Life Metal was recorded and mixed by Steve Albini entirely using analog tape. The title Life Metal is an inside joke among band members and collaborators that is meant to humorously contrast the genre death metal and conceptually contrast anything that is "not doom-and-gloom". Sunn O))) chose this as the album's title because of both the music's shift in tone and the mindset of the band members at the time of writing. In addition to Greg Anderson and Stephen O'Malley, the album features collaborators Tos Nieuwenhuizen, Tim Midyett, Hildur Guðnadóttir, and Anthony Pateras.

Life Metal was written and recorded alongside what has been described as a "sister album" or a "fraternal twin" album titled Pyroclasts that was released on October 25, 2019.

== Writing and recording ==
Greg Anderson and Stephen O'Malley, along with frequent collaborator Tos Nieuwenhuizen, crafted Life Metal in two practice sessions in Los Angeles, California. The material written during those sessions featured a comparatively more upbeat tone with "brightness and a symphonic quality" compared to the rest of Sunn O)))'s discography that stems in part from Anderson and O'Malley being content with their personal and creative lives. Anderson challenged himself to write heavy music that wasn't "so dark", and further elaborated on the new tone and vibe of the album:

"[Life Metal is] sort of a personal reflection of my life as well. Having children and being a father has really changed me in a lot of ways—and for the better in some ways—but I have a different outlook on things now. Trying to be selfless in my life is important, and that's changed me and changed my mood and how I'm thinking about music and how I'm writing at the moment."

Sunn O))) recorded Life Metal with Steve Albini at Electrical Audio in Chicago. The year 2018 marked the 20th anniversary of the band and it wanted to honor that milestone with a special producer in Albini, who had previously toured alongside Sunn O))) with his band Shellac. Anderson said of the collaboration: "Stephen and I had this sort of bucket list: 'These are some things that would be great to try and do this year.' At the top of the list was to record with Albini. I knew him a little bit, so it wasn't a cold call, but I was still very nervous about whether he'd be available or willing to do it." According to the album's press release announcement, Albini answered their call and said: "Sure, this will be fun. I have no idea what is going to happen." Contrasting the two-year recording period for Sunn O)))'s 2009 album Monoliths & Dimensions, the band recorded both Life Metal and Pyroclasts over two weeks in July 2018. The band was able to record quickly because the tracks were already "fleshed-out concepts and arrangements" going into Electrical, whereas Sunn O))) would typically build on rough skeletons of ideas in the studio. In the studio, the band was joined by bassist Tim Midyett (Silkworm) and classically trained cellist Hildur Guðnadóttir (music department for Arrival and composer for Joker). Australian composer Anthony Pateras arranged and composed pipe organ tracks for "Troubled Air" from a studio in Germany. All three of these collaborators were described as "adding to the record's vibrant color and tone". Sunn O))) occasionally writes and performs using a method it calls a "riff exchange", where one member improvises on the guitar while the other drones, then they switch. The duo worked with Guðnadóttir in this studio using this method.

Life Metal was recorded on all-analog audio equipment, including post-production mixing and editing. While some Sunn O))) releases were recorded to analog (such as The Grimmrobe Demos, ØØ Void and Monoliths & Dimensions) they were later edited using Digital Audio Tape and Pro Tools, making Life Metal the band's first purely analog release. By avoiding digital manipulation, Anderson described the recordings as "the ultimate live recording of the band, in some ways." He elaborated: "In the past, we achieved this extreme wall of sound sound by [digitally] layering and stacking guitars after guitars, after bass, to create this massive wall of sound. With Albini, it was captured in one take in the room with the people playing the music." O'Malley said Albini's recordings make the album "sound like you're in front of the amplifiers" and that "it's a really great capture of our structure and color and texture."

== Artwork and title ==
I think the life metal thing, with us, is that we've all sort of gotten to this point in our lives where there are some really great things happening. I had some children, Stephen had some really positive things happen in his life, and [keyboardist] Tos [Nieuwenhuizen] did as well. The sound of the music we're creating is brighter, and the overall aesthetic and feeling of it isn't so gloomy and dark. It was still heavy, but it kind of had this really epic, shining light feeling to it. So, Life Metal as a title of the record really fit where everyone's heads are at, everyone's tone and the music we were creating.

— Greg Anderson, New Noise Magazine

Life Metal's cover and physical packaging features four paintings by artist Samantha Keely Smith: "Manifold" (2015, cover), "Pulse" (2016, gatefold), "Amplify" (2017, gatefold) and "Beacon" (2014, back cover). The pieces are meant to represent the blending of 19th-century Romanticism, late-20th-century abstract expressionism and the band's unique approach to the genre of metal music. Anderson said of the original paintings: "There's something about that art that is very powerful. The colors were really different than we've ever had on a Sunn O))) cover." Photographer Ronald Dick was hired to photograph the pieces "in baths of light color representing depth of sound pressure in the work" to be adapted into the packaging.

The album's title has been an inside joke among Sunn O))) band members and bands they've toured with for years. After a Hellacopters show, guitarist Nicke Andersson explained to the band that Entombed was once described as "sellouts" by fans for signing with the major label Columbia Records in the 1990s. He said his music at the time was described by critics as "life metal" as opposed to the death metal genre they were known for. O'Malley and Anderson thought this was funny, and used the term to describe anything "positive or bright or happy" or "not gloom-and-doom" in their friend group—even knowing it was considered an insult in the Norwegian metal community. As an example of the inside joke, when Attila Csihar (Mayhem vocalist and Sunn O))) collaborator) was getting into fitness, he would say humorously, "Hey, bros, I'm gonna go do some life metal."

Sunn O))) adopted the joke as the title of its album Life Metal because the band felt that it accurately represented "the mindset and the mood" of everyone involved in the record and the "antithesis" of what was expected of the band. Greg Anderson elaborated: "Me and Stephen and Tos [Nieuwenhuizen], the keyboard player, [were] just at a point in our life where things were a different sort of tone and mood. And I think that's reflected in the playing, which is really the important part. I think that the title reflects the atmosphere of the music." This shift in tone was also represented through the album's artwork. While Sunn O)))'s previous albums feature "a lot of dark [tones] and a lot of blacks and whites," the artwork and packaging for Life Metal was intentionally more colorful.

== Release and promotion ==
Life Metal was announced in February 2019 with the release of a five-minute trailer featuring a video panning across the album's artwork and part of song playing in the background. Pyroclasts was also teased during the announcement, though the band said at the time they don't want to release any further details until closer to its release. The album was released through Southern Lord Records in limited quantities of 2xLPs and CDs for Record Store Day on April 13, 2019, with a wide physical and digital release two weeks later on April 26. Preceding the album's release, the band hosted two free album listening parties: one in Paris on March 31 and another in London on April 9. In a statement about the listening sessions, Sunn O))) said: "Part of the joy of producing and mastering this album in the studio was that we were fortunate to be able to listen on the perfect high-fidelity playback situations for the record, top precise studio sound guided by the best ears in the business. With these public listening sessions, we hope to get a step closer to that experience of being inside the studio for you all at these special events, a few weeks before the album is unleashed upon the world."

To support Life Metal, Sunn O))) will embark on its first US tour since 2017. After a European tour in March 2019, the band embarked on their North American "Let There Be Drone" tour in April 2019, with Papa M (David Pajo of Slint and Zwan).

== Critical reception ==
Professional ratings
Aggregate scores
Source	Rating
AnyDecentMusic?	8.2/10
Metacritic	85/100
Review scores
Source	Rating
AllMusic	4/5 stars
Exclaim!	9/10
Kerrang!	KKKK
The Line of Best Fit	8.5/10
Mojo	4/5 stars
MusicOMH	4.5/5 stars
Pitchfork	8.4/10
PopMatters	6/10
Q	4/5 stars
Uncut	9/10

Prior to release, Life Metal was a highly anticipated Record Store Day release, with several music journalists listing the album as a highlight of the unofficial holiday. It ended up being the 19th best-selling Record Store Day 2019 album (out of 545 exclusive releases) according to figures from Nielsen.

Upon its release, Life Metal received positive reviews from contemporary music critics. At Metacritic, which assigns a normalized rating out of 100 to reviews from mainstream publications, Life Metal received an average score of 85, based on 16 reviews, indicating "universal acclaim". In the review for AllMusic, Thom Jurek wrote that "Life Metal is the dawning of a new phase for Sunn O))), one that resonates with more power and complexity than anything in their catalog." Brayden Turrene was also positive in his appraisal of the album for Exclaim, stating that "Over the course of 20 years, the founding duo of Greg Anderson and Stephen O'Malley have redefined musicality, crafting songs of immense feeling and magnitude out of comparatively few notes. In that way, Life Metal is no exception, and flaunts spirit that is fresh while also wonderfully familiar." Reviewing the album for Kerrang!, Nick Ruskell concluded, "In a weird way, Life Metal is also a superb demonstration of just how broad Sunn O)))'s palette actually is. Where on albums like 2005’s Black One they examined the depths of the sonic abyss, Life Metal finds them full of life and energy. Gloriously triumphant, weirdly exhilarating and entirely engrossing, Sunn O))) have created something genuinely brilliant here."

Jason Anderson of Uncut praised the album, writing that "Life Metal may be the richest work in the band's 21-year mission to reconfigure Tony Iommi-worthy riffage into a soundtrack for mindful meditation." In his review for Mojo, Andrew Perry praised the album's production, writing "Albini also deserves a medal: even at moderate volume, parts of Life Metal may loosen your neighbours' guttering." Bekki Bemrose of musicOMH gave the album 4.5 out of 5 stars, stating that "Life Metal resonates in the surrounding air particles long after the last track concludes, and will reverberate in the minds of listeners longer still. A truly magnificent, very real, and ultimately restorative record." In the review for Pitchfork, Grayson Haver Currin wrote, "These four pieces are best suited to take over a room, to fill a venue as massive as the sound itself and, in turn, to be felt. They vibrate, pulse, and quiver. In a time where we experience so much media on a seemingly microscopic scale, from earbuds to smartphone screens, Life Metal takes up a large space, where devastating waves of sound that make actual ceilings crumble somehow become a restorative listening experience."

In a less favourable review, Nick Soulsby of PopMatters said, "The biggest surprise here is that a band famed for discovering the nuances and unseen potential of repetition, finally sound repetitious."

== Track listing ==
All tracks are written by Stephen O'Malley and Greg Anderson.

No.	Title	Length
1.	"Between Sleipnir's Breaths"	12:39
2.	"Troubled Air"	11:46
3.	"Aurora"	19:07
4.	"Novæ"	25:24
Total length:		68:56

== Personnel ==
Life Metal personnel adapted from LP liner notes.

Sunn O)))

- Greg Anderson – guitars, bass drum
- Stephen O'Malley – guitars

Additional musicians

- Hildur Guðnadóttir – vocals, electric cello, halldorophone
- Tim Midyett – bass, bass crotales
- Tos Nieuwenhuizen – Moog synthesizer
- Anthony Pateras – pipe organ

Production

- Steve Albini – recording, mixing (at Electrical Audio in July 2018)
- Greg Anderson – production
- Matt Colton – mastering (at Alchemy Mastering in October 2018)
- John Lousteau – pre-production engineering (at 606 Studios in June 2018)
- Stephen O'Malley – production
- Anthony Pateras – pipe organ recording and pre-mixing (at Schloss Solitude in July 2018)

Artwork and design

- Ronald Dick – photography
- Samantha Keely Smith – paintings
- Stephen O'Malley – art direction

== Charts ==
Chart (2019)	Peak position
Australian Digital Albums (ARIA)	24
Scottish Albums (Official Charts)	47
