= Life metal =

Life metal may refer to:

- An alternative name for Christian metal or Christian death metal
- Life Metal (album), a 2019 album by drone metal band Sunn O)))
