= Oracle (EP) =

2007 EP by Sunn O)))

EP by Sunn O)))
- Released: 2007
- Recorded: 2006
- Genre: Drone metal, dark ambient
- Length: 34:38; including Helio)))sophist 80:55
- Label: Southern Lord; SUNN77

Sunn O))) chronology
La Mort Noir dans Esch/Alzette (2006)	Oracle (2007)	Dømkirke (2008)

Professional ratings
Review scores
Source	Rating
Pitchfork Media	(7.8/10)

Oracle is an EP by American drone metal band Sunn O))). The track "Orakalum" was recorded as part of a collaboration between the band and sculptor/installation artist Banks Violette for an exhibit at London's Maureen Paley gallery. The exhibit took place in two rooms: one with a black stage where the band recorded "Orakulum" with Attila Csihar locked inside a white coffin, and one with a white replica of the band's stage set up (including amps and guitars) cast out of salt and resin with a destroyed black coffin. The audience was locked outside for the performance and let inside after the band left "to generate a feeling of absence, loss and a phantom of what was."

== Track listing ==
=== Oracle ===
1. "Belülről Pusztít" – 16:01
2. "Orakulum" – 18:37

=== Limited Edition Bonus Disc ===
1. "Helio)))sophist" – 46:17

== Musicians ==
- Greg Anderson
- Stephen O'Malley
- Attila Csihar
- Atsuo
- Joe Preston
- Tos Nieuwenhuizen
- Oren Ambarchi
