= Kannon (album) =

2015 album by Sunn O)))

Studio album by Sunn O)))
- Released: December 4, 2015
- Recorded: 2015
- Genres: Drone metal, noise
- Length: 33:26
- Labels: Southern Lord; SUNN250
- Producers: Stephen O'Malley, Greg Anderson, Randall Dunn

Sunn O))) chronology
Soused (2014)	Kannon (2015)	Life Metal (2019)

Kannon is the seventh studio album by American drone metal band Sunn O))). Its lyrics are a retelling of Buddhist stories about the bodhisattva Kannon.

Professional ratings
Aggregate scores
Source	Rating
AnyDecentMusic?	7.4/10
Metacritic	81/100
Review scores
Source	Rating
AllMusic	4/5 stars
Consequence of Sound	B+
The Guardian	4/5 stars
Pitchfork	6.5/10

== Track listing ==
All tracks are written by Stephen O'Malley and Greg Anderson, lyrics by Attila Csihar

No.	Title	Length
1.	"Kannon 1"	12:50
2.	"Kannon 2"	9:10
3.	"Kannon 3"	11:26
Total length:		33:26

== Production ==
- Produced by Sunn O))) (Stephen O'Malley and Greg Anderson) with Randall Dunn
- Engineers: Randall Dunn, Jason Ward
- Assistant Engineer: Mell Dettmer
- Art direction: Stephen O'Malley
- Cover art: Angela Bolliger, photographed by Robyn Vickers, text by Aliza Shvarts
- Band portraits: Estelle Hanania

== Personnel ==
- Stephen O'Malley – guitars
- Greg Anderson – bass guitar, additional guitars on tracks 2 and 3
- Attila Csihar – voice
- Oren Ambarchi – additional guitars and oscillator on tracks 1 and 2
- Randall Dunn – Korg MS-20 on tracks 1 and 2
- Steve Moore – Juno 106 on track 2
- Brad Mowen – concert bass drum on track 2
- Rex Ritter – Moog on track 2
- Dempster, Priester, and Moore – conch trio

Credits adapted from official marketing text.
