= Terrestrials (Sunn O))) and Ulver album) =

2014 album by Sunn O))) and Ulver

Terrestrials

Studio album by Sunn O))) and Ulver
- Released: February 3, 2014
- Recorded: 2008–2012
- Studio: Crystal Canyon, Oslo, Norway
- Genre: Experimental metal, post-black metal
- Length: 35:13
- Label: Southern Lord
- Producer: Stephen O'Malley, Kristoffer Rygg

Sunn O))) chronology
LA REH 012 (2014)	Terrestrials (2014)	Soused (2014)

Ulver chronology
Messe I.X–VI.X (2013)	Terrestrials (2014)	ATGCLVLSSCAP (2016)

Terrestrials is a collaborative studio album by American drone metal band Sunn O))) and Norwegian experimental music group Ulver. Produced by Stephen O'Malley and Kristoffer Rygg, it was released on February 3, 2014, via Southern Lord Records. It has been described as "three live improvisation pieces".

On December 10, 2013, a sample from the closing track, "Eternal Return", was released for streaming. It was also streamed on Pitchfork Advance on the day it was released until February 10, 2014.

== Background ==
The relationship between Ulver and Sunn O))) extends to the mid-1990s, when Stephen O'Malley interviewed Kristoffer Rygg for various magazines. Ulver produced a track on Sunn O)))'s White1 and O'Malley played with Rygg and Daniel O'Sullivan, also of Ulver, in the ambient/noise band, Aethenor. Sunn O))) was invited to perform at the Øya festival in Oslo, at which time Rygg proposed that the band remain in the country for several additional days in order to collaborate. The bands created "the foundations for a bunch of tracks" at Ulver's studio, Crystal Canyon, and then Ulver prepared the preliminary arrangements and mix. The bands collaborated on the production, which, as O'Malley explained,

took a while because we don't live in the same country and everyone's just really busy. I got to be honest, for a while it wasn't a priority. It was something we were doing because we enjoyed each other’s company and we enjoyed the music but it wasn't like the new album of either band. It didn't have that urgency to it. Also, I think the music, the pacing and the feeling of the music itself kind of suggests that too.

As O'Malley explained of the three "live improvisation pieces" comprising the album, "I remember the vibe in the room back then was more rāga than it was rock. And despite the fact that the walls were literally shaking from volume, it was actually quite a blissed out, psychedelic session. I wanted to preserve that vibe in the final mix".

== Critical reception ==
Professional ratings
Aggregate scores
Source	Rating
Metacritic	77/100
Review scores
Source	Rating
About.com	4/5 stars
AllMusic	4/5 stars
Blabbermouth	8.5/10
Consequence of Sound	B−
Drowned in Sound	7/10
The Guardian	4/5 stars
NME	8/10
Pitchfork	6.9/10
The Quietus	favorable

Upon its release, Terrestrials received positive reviews from music critics. At Metacritic, which assigns a normalized rating out of 100 to reviews from critics, the album received an average score of 77, which indicates "generally favorable reviews", based on 18 reviews. Tristan Bath, writing for The Quietus, described the collaboration as "a meeting of chameleonic polyglots, and the result is most unexpectedly beautiful and luminescent". The Guardian's Jamie Thomson noted that the interaction between Ulver and Sunn O))) "isn't just greater than the sum of its parts; it's a distinct journey between two disparate musical camps" that is "long, languorous and wonderful in its invention, with Ulver lending emotional heft to Sunn O)))'s wall of tone". Writing for AllMusic, Thom Jurek lauded the album, as "it perfectly reflects both Sunn O)))'s impenetrably emotional dark heart and Ulver's expertly crafted senses of drama and dynamic". Ray Van Horn Jr., writing for Blabbermouth, described the album as "one of the most fascinating albums in either act's careers."

However, the album did receive some qualified criticism, with Consequence of Sound's Adam Kivel suggesting that the "collaboration doesn't quite rival the strongest albums of either band's catalog, but Sunn O))) and Ulver have produced an ecstatic, beautiful piece of experimental metal that celebrates the strengths of both bands". Grayson Currin of Pitchfork also indicated that the impact of the songs proved fleeting: "After the sun rises on these meditations, then, you can simply go about your daily routine, somewhat elevated but mostly unaltered".

== Track listing ==
No.	Title	Length
1.	"Let There Be Light"	11:27
2.	"Western Horn"	9:37
3.	"Eternal Return"	14:09
Total length:		35:13

=== Daymare 2CD Bonus Tracks ===
No.	Title	Length
1.	"Eternal Return (Rough 2009)"	14:05
2.	"Fidelio (Experiment 2009 feat. Attila Csihar)"	11:42

== Personnel ==
Sunn O)))

- Greg Anderson
- Stephen O'Malley

Ulver

- Daniel O'Sullivan – guitars
- Kristoffer Rygg – vocals, programming
- Jørn H. Sværen – instrumentals
- Tore Ylwizaker – keyboards, programming

Additional musicians

- Ole Henrik Moe – viola, violin
- Kari Rønnekleiv – viola, violin
- Stig Espen Hundsnes – trumpet
- Tomas Pettersen – drums

Production

- Anders Møller – mixing
- Jaime Gomez Arellano – mastering
- Stephen O’Malley – production, art direction
- Kristoffer Rygg – production

== Charts ==
Chart (2014)	Peak position
Finnish Albums (Suomen virallinen lista)	47
UK Independent Albums (OCC)	38
UK Rock & Metal Albums (OCC)	21
