= Joe Preston (musician) =

American musician (born 1969)

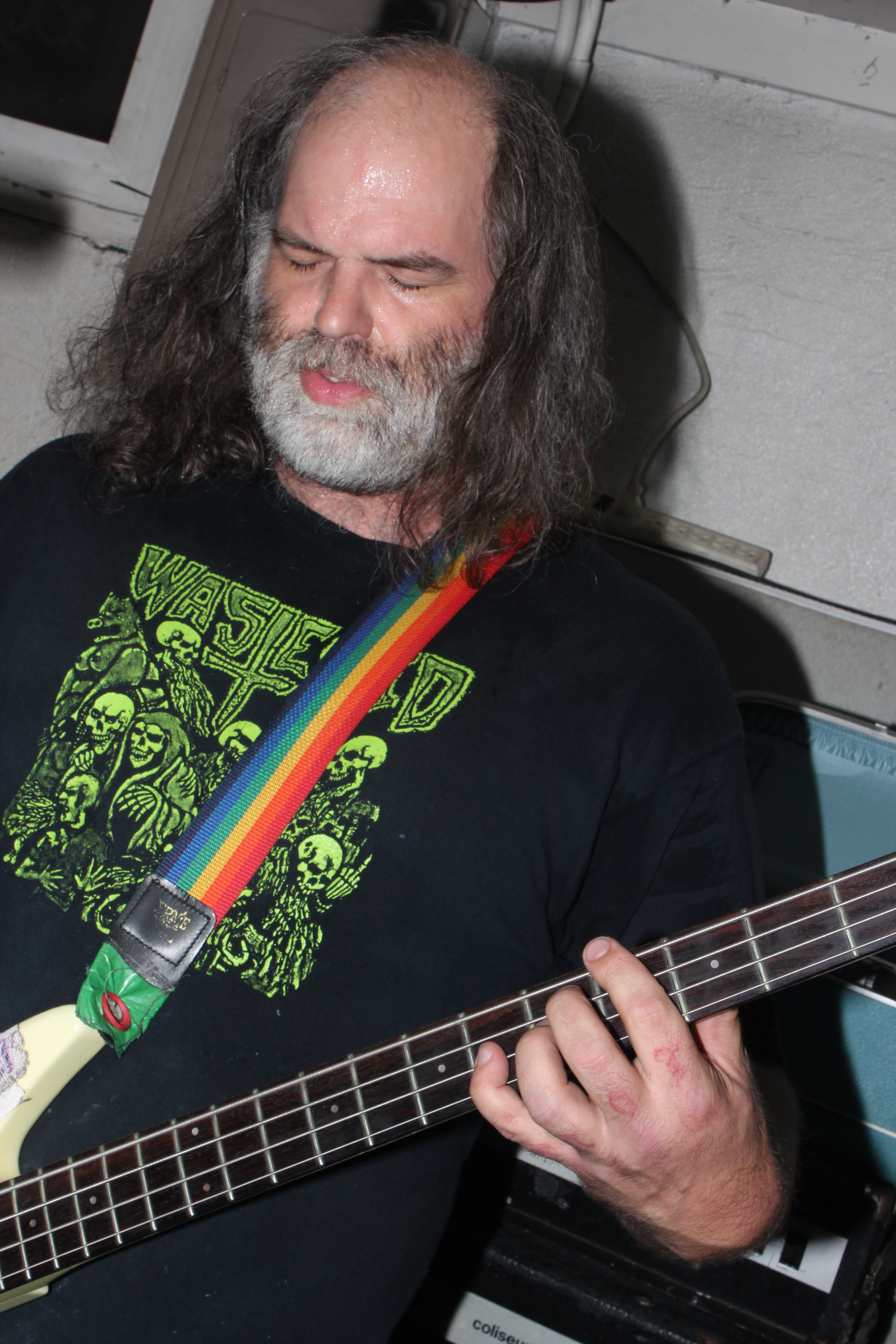
- Preston performing as Thrones in 2015

Background information
- Also known as: Stinky; Salty Green
- Born: 1969 (age 56–57)
- Origin: Salem, Oregon, U.S.
- Genres: Doom metal; experimental; sludge metal; punk rock; psychedelic rock; drone metal
- Instruments: Bass; vocals; keyboards

Joe Preston (born October 1969) is an American bass guitarist and a former band member of the rock bands Earth, Melvins, Men's Recovery Project, The Need and High on Fire. Preston has also played with Sunn O))), and has his long-running solo project called Thrones. In 2007, he joined Harvey Milk in the studio for the recording of Life... The Best Game in Town and toured with them during their 2008 US and European tours. He is currently serving as a touring member of Sumac. He is the uncle of actor Dominic Janes.

== Discography ==
=== Earth ===
- Extra-Capsular Extraction (1991, Sub Pop)
- Sunn Amps and Smashed Guitars (2001, No Quarter)

=== Melvins ===
- Salad of a Thousand Delights VHS (1992, Box Dog Video)
- Joe Preston CD/EP (1992, Boner Records)
- Lysol CD/LP (1992, Boner Records)
- "Night Goat" single (1992, Amphetamine Reptile Records)

=== Thrones ===
- Untitled demo cassette (1994, Punk in My Vitamins? Records)
- Alraune CD (1996, The Communion Label)
- "The Suckling" 7" (1995, Kill Rock Stars)
- "Reddleman" 7" (1999, Punk in My Vitamins? Records)
- "Senex" 7" (1995, Soda Girl Records)
- Split 7" with Behead the Prophet, No Lord Shall Live (1999, Voice of the Sky Records)
- White Rabbit 12" EP (1999, Kill Rock Stars)
- Sperm Whale 12" EP (2000, Kill Rock Stars)
- Sperm Whale/White Rabbit CD (2000, Kill Rock Stars)
- Day Late, Dollar Short compilation CD (2005, Southern Lord Records)
- Late For Dinner 7" (2010, Conspiracy Records)

=== Harvey Milk ===
- Life... The Best Game in Town (2008, Hydra Head Records)

=== The Need ===
- "Jacky O' Lantern" 7" single (1997, Outpunk Records)
- The Need CD/LP (1997, Chainsaw Records)
- The Need w/Joe Preston & DJ Zena 10" EP (1998, Up Records)
- The Need Is Dead CD (2000, Chainsaw Records)

=== Men's Recovery Project ===
- Grappling With the Homonids CD/LP (1998, Vermiform Records)
- Resist The New Way CD/LP (1999, Vermiform Records)

=== Sunn O))) ===
- White1 CD/2xLP (2003, Southern Lord Records)
- White2 CD/2xLP (2004, Southern Lord Records)
- Altar (collaboration with Boris, CD 2006, 2xCD ltd. 5000 2006, 3xLP 2007 Southern Lord Records)
- Oracle 2xCD/LP (2007 Southern Lord Records) (appears on "Belülrol Pusztít" playing Jackhammer)
- Monoliths & Dimensions CD/2xLP (2006, Southern Lord Records) (Male choir)

=== High on Fire ===
- Blessed Black Wings (2005 Relapse Records)
- Split with Ruins 7"/comic book (2005, Skin Graft Records/Relapse Records)

=== Witchypoo ===
- Public Works CD/LP (5 Rue Christine)
- Everybody Looks Good in a Helmet CD/LP (Kill Rock Stars)
- Pitching Woo CD (Vermiform Records)
- Witchypoo Salutes the Space Program 7" (Vermiform Records)
- Olympia Must Die 7" (Thin the Herd Records)

=== Other ===
- C-Average – C-Average CD/LP (Kill Rock Stars)
- Godheadsilo – The Scientific Supercake CD/LP (Kill Rock Stars)
- Godheadsilo – Skyward in Triumph CD/LP
- Godheadsilo – Booby Trap 7"
- Godheadsilo – Thee Friendship Village EP
- The Hoodwinks – Stab, Stab, Stab CD/LP (Thin the Herd Records)
- Loud Machine 0.5 – Loud Machine 0.5 7" (Yoyo Records)
- Snakepit – "Wait" b/w "Disease" 7" (Self Release)
- Snakepit – "Waste" b/w "Million" 7" (Self Release)
- Sue P. Fox – Light Matches, Spark Lives CD/LP (Kill Rock Stars)
- Superconductor – Touring bassist
- The Whip – "Freelance Liaison" b/w "Sheep and Goat" 7" (Wantage Records)
- Joe Preston and Daniel Menche – Cerberic Doxology (Anthem Records)
