= Dømkirke =

2008 live album by Sunn O)))

Live album by Sunn O)))
- Released: September 22, 2008
- Recorded: March 18, 2007
- Genre: Drone doom, ambient music
- Length: 64:14
- Label: Southern Lord (SUNN94)
- Producer: Sunn O)))

Sunn O))) chronology
Oracle (2007)	Dømkirke (2008)	Monoliths & Dimensions (2009)

Professional ratings
Review scores
Source	Rating
AllMusic	3.5/5 stars
Consequence	A−
Tiny Mix Tapes	3.5/5 marks

Dømkirke is a live album by American drone metal band Sunn O))) that was recorded at Bergen Cathedral in Bergen, Norway, during the Borealis Festival. The album was pressed only on vinyl, but it was later made available in digital-download and streaming formats. It is a double album that features one track on each side of the records. The packaging of Dømkirke features artwork by the Norwegian visual artist Tania Stene.

Nicholas Mollerhaug of the Borealis Festival commissioned the performance by Sunn O))). The band did not publicize in advance the appearance of vocalist Attila Csihar, due to his history with the black metal genre and that genre's association with a string of church arsons in Norway, the first of which occurred in the city of Bergen.

== Track listing ==
No.	Title	Length
1.	"Why Dost Thou Hide Thyself in Clouds?"	15:08
2.	"Cannon"	18:05
3.	"Cymatics"	15:46
4.	"Masks the Ætmospheres"	15:15

The D-side is etched with "Fantoft, Fantoft, don't you wanna?"

== Pressings ==
All pressings are on 180g vinyl.

- Baby blue marble vinyl (Exclusive to Europe. Limited to 1000)
- Clear vinyl with black swirls (Mail order only. Limited to 900 copies)
- Red vinyl (Hot Topic Exclusive. Limited to 600 copies)
- Black vinyl
- 2nd Press: all on grey vinyl

== Personnel ==
- Stephen O'Malley
- Greg Anderson
- Attila Csihar
- Steve Moore
- Lasse Marhaug
- T.O.S
