= Soused (album) =

2014 album by Scott Walker and Sunn O)))

Studio album by Scott Walker + Sunn O)))
- Released: October 21, 2014
- Recorded: Early 2014
- Genre: Avant-garde, experimental rock, art rock, drone metal
- Length: 48:32
- Language: English
- Label: 4AD
- Producer: Scott Walker; Peter Walsh

Scott Walker chronology
| Bish Bosch (2012) | Soused (2014) | The Childhood of a Leader (2016) |

Sunn O))) chronology
| Terrestrials (2014) | Soused (2014) | Kannon (2015) |

Soused is a collaborative album by singer Scott Walker and American drone metal band Sunn O))). Announced in early 2014 by 4AD, the album was produced by Walker and Peter Walsh with the help of Mark Warman and released on October 21, 2014. It is the last album Walker released during his lifetime, barring soundtrack work. 4AD released a music video for the song "Brando", directed by French filmmaker Gisèle Vienne.

== Production and recording ==
Sunn O))) songwriters Stephen O'Malley and Greg Anderson had previously contacted Walker about contributing vocals to Monoliths & Dimensions in 2009, but Walker declined due to prior engagements. While developing material for his follow up record to 2012's Bish Bosch, Walker reached out to the band. Walker's decision to incorporate drones came about while developing lyrics. As the singer-composer stated, "I could get those gaps, you see, between phrases. Which I usually fill with silence, but now I had the drones."

Upon agreeing to collaborate, Walker sent O'Malley and Anderson a series of wordless demos of tracks he produced, alongside Peter Walsh, made entirely with synthesizers. With the synthesizers, Walker directly outlined the instrumental accompaniments that O'Malley and Anderson were to provide via guitar drones. To record Sunn O)))'s guitar drones, the band brought its entire stage equipment, a large collection of amplifiers, to Walker's London studio space.

Walker initially wanted to name the album Ronronner, French for "purr", "like the noise a big cat would make"; but O'Malley, who lives in France, believed that French audiences would read it as "too cute". Walker then came up with Soused, with the intended meaning of being submerged in water.

== Reception ==
Professional ratings
Aggregate scores
| Source | Rating |
|---|---|
| AnyDecentMusic? | 7.9/10 |
| Metacritic | 83/100 |
Review scores
| Source | Rating |
| AllMusic | 4.5/5 stars |
| The A.V. Club | A |
| Clash | 8/10 |
| Drowned in Sound | 9/10 |
| Fact | 4/5 stars |
| The Guardian | 5/5 stars |
| The Line of Best Fit | 10/10 |
| The Observer | 4/5 stars |
| Pitchfork | 7.4/10 |
| Slant Magazine | 3.5/5 stars |

According to the review aggregator Metacritic, Soused received "universal acclaim" based on a weighted average score of 83 out of 100 from 29 critic scores.

== Track listing ==
=== CD and digital editions ===
1. "Brando" (Note: An alternative title, "Brando (Dwellers on the Bluff)", is given with the lyrics in the liner notes.) – 8:42
2. "Herod 2014" – 11:59
3. "Bull" – 9:21
4. "Fetish" (Note: An alternative title, "Fetish (Flip'n'Zip)", is given with the lyrics in the liner notes.) – 9:08
5. "Lullaby" – 9:22

=== Vinyl LP edition ===
Side one

1. "Brando" – 8:42
2. "Bull" – 9:21

Side two

3. "Herod 2014" – 11:59

Side three

4. "Fetish" – 9:08
5. "Lullaby" – 9:22

== Personnel ==
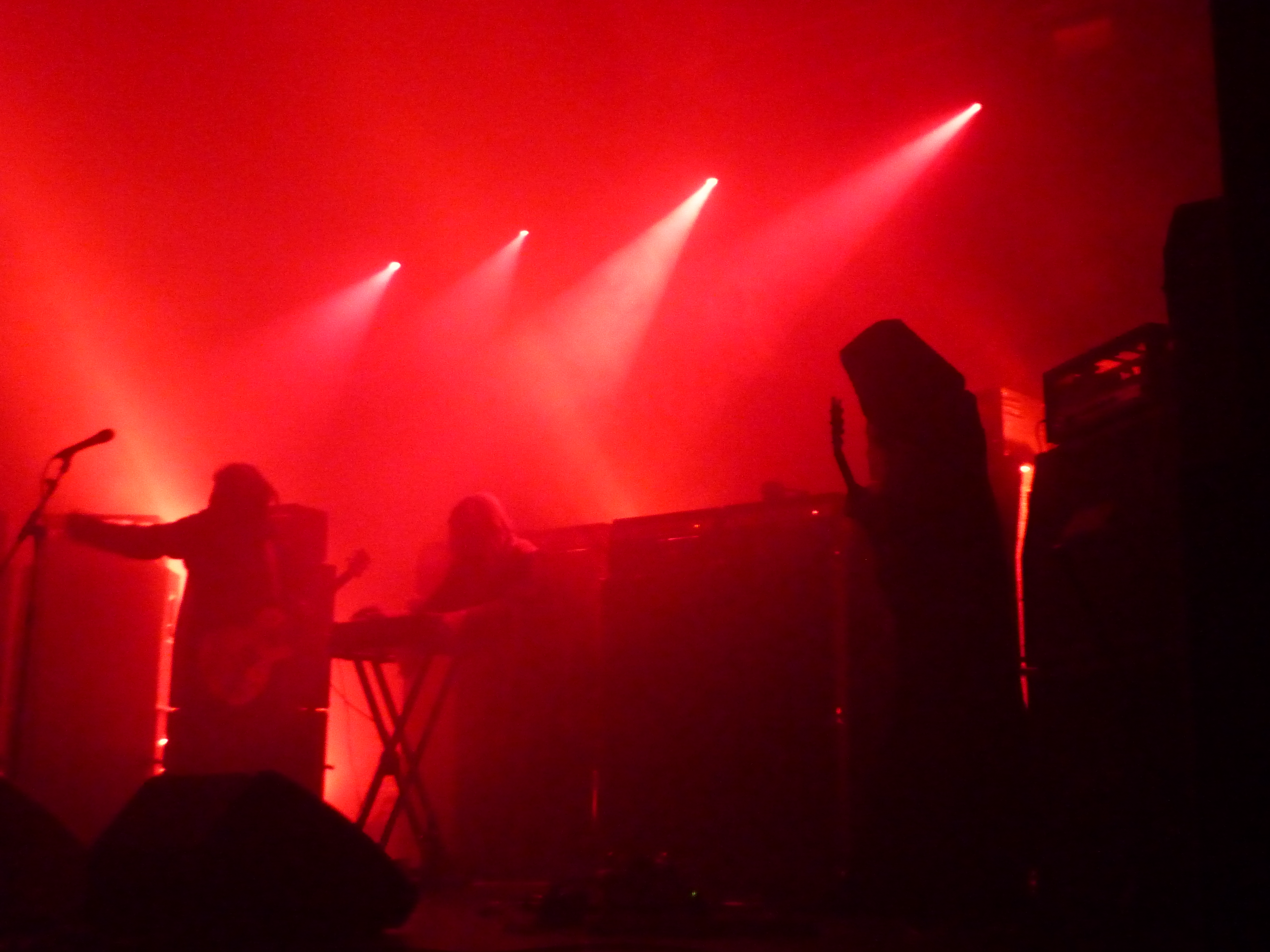
Sunn O))) performing live. "I’m always looking for an elemental, primal noise in my music," said Walker. "I figured, if I’m going to do the drone thing, they’re the kings of the drone, to me. I might as well get them."

- Greg Anderson – guitars, percussion guitar on "Bull", lead guitar on "Lullaby"
- Tos Nieuwenhuizen – lead guitar (except for "Bull"); moog on "Brando", "Bull", and "Lullaby"; riff guitar on "Fetish"
- Stephen O'Malley – guitars, bass guitar on "Brando" and "Fetish", feedback guitar on "Bull" and "Fetish", lead guitar on "Bull" and "Herod 2014", percussion guitar on "Bull", re-amped hi synth on "Lullaby", sleeve design, type
- Scott Walker – vocals, production, composer, drum programming on "Lullaby", mixing

=== Additional personnel ===
- Dot Allison – backing vocals on "Bull"
- Frank Arkwright – mastering
- Guy Barker – trumpet (except "Herod 2014")
- Gast Bouschet – cover photo, photography
- Andy Findon – saxophone on "Herod 2014"
- Peter Gamble – bull whips on "Brando"
- Phil Laslett – photography
- Liam Nolan – assistant
- Simon Saywood – analog technical support
- Ian Thomas – drums (except "Herod 2014")
- Peter Walsh – co-production, recording, mixing, electronic sound treatment, audio manipulation keyboards fx (except "Lullaby"), drum programming (except "Fetish"), mastering
- Sam Walsh – backing vocals on "Bull"
- Mark Warman – electronic sound treatment, audio manipulation, keyboards, drum programming on "Brando" and "Herod 2014", shaker on "Fetish", musical direction, orchestration

Credits adapted from AllMusic.
