= The Want (New Jersey band) =

- Origin: Union, New Jersey, USA
- Genres: Stoner rock, blues rock
- Labels: Mack-Daddy Records; Southern Lord Records
- Members: Kenneth Leer; Rick Fiorio; Jeff Mackey; Adam Valk

The Want was an American stoner/blues rock band from Union, New Jersey.

== History ==
The Want put out two albums in the 90s but are best remembered for their "greatest hits" compilation on Southern Lord Records released in 2000. They draw heavily from 70s influences (Led Zeppelin and Black Sabbath are usually noted) and have been criticized for being too loyal to their roots.

The Want released their debut album, 5 O'Clock Orange, in 1996 on Mack-Daddy Records. A follow-up, Acid Millennium, was released the following year. In 2000 Southern Lord Records released a compilation of songs from the first two albums with the misleading title Greatest Hits Vol. 5. They also recorded "Let the Music Do the Talking," which appeared on Right in the Nuts, a tribute to Aerosmith released by Small Stone Records.

After the Want disbanded, bassist Jeff Mackey joined Eighteen Wheels Burning and later recruited former Want guitarist Adam Valk for the same project.

== Line-up ==
- Kenneth Leer - vocals
- Rick Fiorio - drums
- Jeff Mackey - bass
- Adam Valk - guitar

== Discography ==
=== Albums ===
- 5 O'Clock Orange (1996 Mack-Daddy Records)
- Acid Millennium (1997 Mack-Daddy Records)
- Greatest Hits Vol. 5 (2000 Southern Lord Records)

=== Compilation appearances ===
- "Let the Music Do the Talking" (Aerosmith cover) on Right in the Nuts (2000 Small Stone Records)
- "Goodbye" on Doomed (2000 This Dark Reign Records)
