= Flight of the Behemoth =

Studio album by Sunn O)))
- Released: January 22, 2002
- Recorded: April 1998 – November 2000 at The Gas Chamber in Los Angeles
- Genre: Drone metal
- Length: 51:27 (CD); 68:07 (2LP); 99:05 (2CD/Bandcamp)
- Labels: Southern Lord Records (CD, Bandcamp, second 2LP release) (SUNN15); Bisect Bleep Industries (1st 2LP release); Daymare (2CD)
- Producers: Mystik Kliff & Mathias Schneeberger

Sunn O))) chronology
ØØ Void (2000)	Flight of the Behemoth (2002)	White1 (2003)

Professional ratings
Review scores
Source	Rating
AllMusic link	4/5 stars
Pitchfork Media link	(8.5/10)

Flight of the Behemoth (also known as 3: Flight of the Behemoth) is the second studio album by American drone metal band Sunn O))).

== Background and release ==
The band collaborated with the Japanese noise artist Merzbow, who mixed tracks 3 and 4, and a recording of the two performing together at the 2007 Earthdom Festival in Tokyo was added for a 2007 2CD reissue in Japan. Southern Lord released this version as a download on Bandcamp in 2013.

The French label Bisect Bleep Industries released the first pressings of the 2LP version in 2002 (200 copies on black vinyl, 150 on red, 150 on clear), with the bonus track "Grimm & Bear It", which was recorded live at Gaba in Los Angeles in 1998. Southern Lord remastered and re-released this version (800 copies on gold & black splatter vinyl for Record Store Day 2010's third drop, 500 on gold) in 2010. "Grimm & Bear It" was later included as a bonus track on the 2005 CD reissue of The Grimmrobe Demos.

Sunn O))) used a drum machine and their own vocals for the first time ever on the track "F.W.T.B.T.", an interpretation of Metallica's "For Whom the Bell Tolls". In the one-sheet available on the link printed on promotional copies, the song was given the subtitle "I Dream of Lars Ulrich Being Thrown Through the Bus Window Instead of My Master Mystikal Kliff Burton" [sic].

== Track listing ==
No.	Title	Length
1.	"Mocking Solemnity"	9:12
2.	"Death Becomes You"	13:09
3.	"O)))Bow 1"	5:54
4.	"O)))Bow 2"	12:53
5.	"F.W.T.B.T."	10:19
Total length:		51:27

2LP bonus track

No.	Title	Length
6.	"Grimm & Bear It"	16:40

2CD/Bandcamp bonus tracks

No.	Title	Length
6.	"O)))Bow 3"	23:45
7.	"O)))Bow 4"	24:20

== Session musicians ==
- Aspirin Feast – drums on "F.W.T.B.T."
- Bootsy Kronos – bass guitar on "F.W.T.B.T."
