= Baptists (band) =

Canadian hardcore and metalcore band

Background information
- Origin: Vancouver, Canada
- Genres: Hardcore punk; metalcore; crust punk
- Years active: 2010–2023
- Labels: Southern Lord, Holy Roar
- Members: Andrew Drury; Danny Marshall; Shawn Hawryluk; Nick Yacyshyn

Baptists was a Canadian metallic hardcore band from Vancouver, formed in 2010 by Andrew Drury, Danny Marshall, Shawn Hawryluk and Nick Yacyshyn.

In August 2023, the band announced they were disbanding after allegations arose involving vocalist Andrew Drury.

== Musical style ==
Baptists have been categorized as metallic hardcore, crust punk and hardcore punk.

== Members ==
- Andrew Drury – vocals
- Danny Marshall – guitar
- Shawn Hawryluk – bass
- Nick Yacyshyn – drums (also in Sumac)

== Discography ==
=== Studio albums ===
- Bushcraft (2013)
- Bloodmines (2014)
- Beacon of Faith (2018)

=== EPs ===
- Black Dawn (2010)
- Good Parenting (2011)
