= Loincloth (band) =

American heavy metal band

Loincloth is an American heavy metal band whose members hail from Raleigh, North Carolina and Richmond, Virginia.

== History ==
Loincloth was formed in 2000 by two musicians from Raleigh, Steve Shelton and Cary Rowells, and two from Richmond, Pen Rollings and Tannon Penland. Shelton and Rowells had previously played in Confessor, and Rollings was a member of Breadwinner. The group recorded a four-track demo in 2003 and released a 7" record, "Church Burntings"/"New Jersey", but did not release a full-length until 2012, when Iron Balls of Steel was released on Southern Lord Records. Penland cites the group's long-distance status (Raleigh and Richmond are approximately a three-hour drive away from each other) as one factor in the album's long gestation period.

== Members ==
Current

- Steve Shelton - drums
- Tannon Penland - guitar
- Tomas Phillips - bass
- Craig Hilton - guitar

Former

- Cary Rowells - bass
- Pen Rollings - guitar

== Discography ==
- At War with Norway (demo, 2003)
- Swami Sound System VoL 1 (Swami Records, 2003)
- Church Burntings 7" (Southern Lord Records #25.5, 2003)
- Iron Balls of Steel (Southern Lord Records, 2012)
- Psalm of the Morbid (Southern Lord Records, 2017)
