= Monoliths & Dimensions =

2009 album by Sunn O)))

Studio album by Sunn O)))
- Released: May 18, 2009
- Recorded: 2007–2009
- Genres: Drone metal; avant-garde; dark ambient
- Length: 53:39
- Label: Southern Lord (SUNN100)
- Producers: Mell Dettmer, Randall Dunn

Sunn O))) chronology
| Dømkirke (2008) | Monoliths & Dimensions (2009) | Soused (2014) |

Monoliths & Dimensions
- CD cover

Monoliths & Dimensions is the sixth studio album by American drone metal band Sunn O))). The album was created and recorded over a period of two years and features the collaborations of composer Eyvind Kang, Australian guitar player Oren Ambarchi, Hungarian vocalist Attila Csihar, Dylan Carlson from the drone band Earth, and trombonists Julian Priester and Stuart Dempster. Also present is an upright bass trio; French and English horns; harp and flute duo; piano, brass, reed, and string ensembles; and a Viennese woman's choir led by composer and vocalist Jessika Kenney.

However, the band said, "The album is not Sunn O))) with strings or metal-meets-orchestra material." The band took an approach concentrating on more of allusion toward the timbre of feedback and the instruments involved, so the piece is really illusory, beautiful and not entirely linear, stating, "[The end product is] the most musical piece we’ve done, and also the heaviest, [most] powerful, and most abstract set of chords we’ve laid to tape."

When speaking at the launch of Monoliths & Dimensions, Stephen O'Malley told Alex Templeton-Ward that the album was "like a prism... our music is the white light going in, a lot of the colour comes out the other side through the amazing arrangements and personalities of the guest performers and core collaborators… I think the main topic of this album is elaboration, expansion and prismatic detail. The source of that detail is inherent in the sounds of the guitars and the notes of those arrangements."

The final song, titled "Alice", is a dedication to the jazz musician Alice Coltrane who died in 2007.

== Reception ==
Professional ratings
Aggregate scores
| Source | Rating |
|---|---|
| AnyDecentMusic? | 8.2/10 |
| Metacritic | 88/100 |
Review scores
| Source | Rating |
| AllMusic | 4.5/5 stars |
| Drowned in Sound | 10/10 |
| The Guardian | 5/5 stars |
| Mojo | 4/5 stars |
| MusicOMH | 4.5/5 stars |
| Pitchfork | 8.5/10 |
| Rock Sound | 9/10 |
| Spin | 3.5/5 stars |
| Tiny Mix Tapes | 4.5/5 stars |
| Uncut | 4/5 stars |

Initial critical response to Monoliths & Dimensions was very positive. At Metacritic, which assigns a normalized rating out of 100 to reviews from mainstream critics, the album received an average score of 88, based on 16 reviews.

== Track listing ==
All tracks are written by Anderson and O'Malley, with lyrics on tracks 1 to 3 by Csihar.

| No. | Title | Length |
|---|---|---|
| 1. | "Aghartha" | 17:34 |
| 2. | "Big Church [megszentségteleníthetetlenségeskedéseitekért]" | 9:43 |
| 3. | "Hunting & Gathering (Cydonia)" | 10:02 |
| 4. | "Alice" | 16:20 |
| Total length: | | 53:39 |

== Production ==
- Produced by Mell Dettmer and Randall Dunn
- Engineers: Mell Dettmer, Randall Dunn, Nik Hummer and Armin Steiner
- Assistant engineer: Floyd Reitsman
- Mastering: Mell Dettmer
- Cover art: "Out-of-round X" (1999) by Richard Serra

== Personnel ==
- Stephen O'Malley – electric guitars, acoustic arrangements (1)
- Greg Anderson – bass guitar (1/3/4), electric guitars (2/3)
- Attila Csihar – voices (1/2/3)
- Oren Ambarchi – electric guitars (2/3/4), oscillator (1/4), guitar effects (1), gong (3), wolf log (3), motorized cymbal (4)
- Eyvind Kang – viola (1/2/4), choir arrangements (2), brass arrangements (2), string arrangements (2), ensemble arrangements (4)
- Dylan Carlson – electric guitars (2), choir arrangements (inspired by) (2)
- Julian Priester – conch shell (1), trombone (4)
- Stuart Dempster – conch shell (1), dung chen (1), trombone (4)
- Mell Dettmer – hydrophone (1), tubular bells (2)
- Timb Harris – violin (1/4)
- Jessika Kenney – lead alto vocals (2), lead soprano vocals (2), choir arrangements (2), brass arrangements (2), string arrangements (2)
- Tim Smolens – double bass (1/4)
- Moriah Neils – double bass (4)
- Keith Lowe – double bass (1/4)
- Daniel Menche – male choir (3)
- William Herzog – male choir (3), electric tamboura (3)
- Steve Moore – trombone (2/3/4), conch shell (1), dung chen (1), organ (2), Korg MS20 (3), Roland Juno (3), brass arrangements (3)
- Brad Mowen – concert bass drum (3), percussion (3), man choir (3)
- Joe Preston – man choir (3)
- Rex Ritter – Korg MS20 (2), Moog Voyager (3)
- Hans Teuber – clarinet (1/4), bass clarinet (1), alto flute (1)
- Cuong Vu – trumpet (2)
- Tony Moore – trumpet (3)
- Melissa Walsh – harp (4)
- Taina Karr – English horn (1/4), oboe (4)
- Eric Walton – piano (1)
- Josiah Boothby – French horn (1/4)
- Jutta Sierlinger – choir alto (2)
- Angela Kiemayer – choir alto (2)
- Varena Bodem – choir alto (2)
- Katharina Einsiedl – choir soprano/Alto (2)
- Stephanie Pfeffer – choir soprano/Alto (2)
- Loma Döring – choir soprano/alto (2)

== Release history ==
| Region | Date | Label |
|---|---|---|
| Europe | May 18, 2009 | Southern Lord |
| North America | May 26, 2009 | Southern Lord |
| Asia and Australia | TBA | Southern Lord |
