= White1 =

2003 album by Sunn O)))

Studio album by Sunn O)))
- Released: April 22, 2003
- Recorded: 1996–Dec 2002
- Genre: Drone metal, drone
- Length: 58:40; 74:00 (Vinyl edition)
- Label: Southern Lord Records (SUNN25)
- Producer: Sunn O))) & Rex Ritter

Sunn O))) chronology
Flight of the Behemoth (2002)	White1 (2003)	White2 (2004)

Professional ratings
Review scores
Source	Rating
AllMusic	3/5 stars
Pitchfork	(7.5/10)

White1 is the third studio album by American drone metal band Sunn O))), released in 2003. It was the most significant departure from their original style to date. Each track was experimental in its own way, with Julian Cope reciting poetry for half of "My Wall", Norwegian lyrics sung by Runhild Gammelsæter of Thorr's Hammer as an intro to a drum machine and stoner metal bass riff in "The Gates of Ballard", and the drone track "A Shaving of the Horn that Speared You".

The lyrics of "The Gates of Ballard" come from "Håvard Hedde", a Norwegian folk song. Another metal version of "Håvard Hedde" was recorded in 1995 by the Norwegian band Storm.

In Q magazine's August issue (named the loud issue), they named White1 as the 18th loudest album of all time, just above AC/DC's Back in Black and below the Jimi Hendrix Experience's album Are You Experienced.

== Track listing ==
No.	Title	Length
1.	"My Wall"	25:16
2.	"The Gates of Ballard"	15:32
3.	"A Shaving of the Horn that Speared You"	17:52
4.	"Cut Wooded" (Vinyl and Bandcamp bonus track)	15:21
Total length:		74:01

== Guest musicians ==
- Julian Cope – vocals
- Runhild Gammelsæter – vocals
- Rex Ritter – keyboards
- Joe Preston – guitars, bass guitar, programming, electronics

== See also ==
- White2
- WHITEbox
