= ØØ Void =

2000 studio album by Sunn O)))

Studio album by Sunn O)))
- Released: June 26, 2000
- Recorded: 2000
- Genre: Drone metal
- Length: 58:31; 81:35 (Bonus Disc)
- Label: Rise Above (RISE29); Hydra Head (CD) (HH666-94); Daymare (2xCD) (DYMC-24); Southern Lord (sunn150)
- Producer: Scott Reeder

Sunn O))) chronology
| The Grimmrobe Demos (1999) | ØØ Void (2000) | Flight of the Behemoth (2002) |

Professional ratings
Review scores
| Source | Rating |
|---|---|
| AllMusic | 4/5 stars |
| Pitchfork | 7.5/10 |
| PopMatters | 8/10 |

ØØ Void (pronounced in interviews as "double-O void") is the debut studio album by American drone metal band Sunn O))). The album was recorded on 24 track 2" tape at Grandmaster Studios in Hollywood, a large step forward in production values from the band's demo recording The Grimmrobe Demos.

The third track, "Rabbits' Revenge", is an interpretation of an obscure Melvins' song that was only played live during their early years. A sample of a live performance of the original song can be heard past the five minute mark.

The album was originally released in 2000, by Hydra Head in the USA, and by Rise Above in Europe and the United Kingdom. In 2008, ØØ Void was reissued and released in Japan only, through the Japanese record label Daymare Recordings. The reissue was a two-disc set, with the first disc containing all of the original tracks from ØØ Void and the second disc containing a collaboration between Sunn O))) and the experimental/industrial group Nurse with Wound. The album was re-released in the original single-disc format in 2011 by Southern Lord Recordings, with new album artwork by Stephen Kasner.

== Track listing ==
ØØ Void
| No. | Title | Length |
|---|---|---|
| 1. | "Richard" | 14:32 |
| 2. | "NN O)))" | 15:15 |
| 3. | "Rabbits' Revenge" (Melvins cover) | 14:01 |
| 4. | "Ra at Dusk" | 14:43 |
| Total length: | | 58:31 |

=== Bonus disc ===
All music is composed by Sunn O))) and Nurse with Wound.

The Iron Soul of Nothing
| No. | Title | Length |
|---|---|---|
| 1. | "Dysnystaxis (...A Chance Meeting with Somnus)" | 19:01 |
| 2. | "Ash on the Trees (The Sudden Ebb of a Diatribe)" | 17:08 |
| 3. | "Ra at Dawn (Rapture, At Last, Numbered by Her Light)" | 25:25 |

== Guest musicians ==
"NN O)))"

- Petra Haden – violin, vocals
- Scott Reeder – bass guitar
- Pete Stahl – vocals
