= The Grimmrobe Demos =

1999 album by Sunn O)))

Demo album by Sunn O)))
- Released: 1999
- Recorded: 1998
- Genre: Drone doom
- Length: 55:42; 72:26 (CD bonus); 72:06 (vinyl edition)
- Label: Hydra Head Records (HH666-93) Southern Lord; SUNN37
- Producer: Sunn O))) & Mathias Schneeberger

Sunn O))) chronology
The Grimmrobe Demos (1999)	ØØ Void (2000)

Professional ratings
Review scores
Source	Rating
AllMusic	4/5 stars
Pitchfork	(8.0/10)
Tiny Mix Tapes	4.5/5 marks

The Grimmrobe Demos is the first demo album by American drone metal band Sunn O))). It was originally limited to 500 copies by Hydra Head Records but, in 2005, Southern Lord Records reissued it on CD and vinyl with a bonus live track. An early rehearsal track titled "Bremerton" was included on the vinyl release.

The album's third track was named after frontman Dylan Carlson of the band Earth and is a loose interpretation of the track "Ouroboros is Broken" from Earth's first release, Extra-Capsular Extraction.

The booklet of the second version of the album contains a long passage of apocalyptic writing by Seldon Hunt, written in Melbourne, Australia, during October 2004.

On August 8, 2008, Sunn O))) announced that it would do a mini-tour consisting of four concerts to commemorate the tenth anniversary of the album's release.

== Track listing ==
No.	Title	Length
1.	"Black Wedding"	19:17
2.	"Defeating: Earth's Gravity"	14:59
3.	"Dylan Carlson"	21:30

CD re-issue bonus track
No.	Title	Length
4.	"Grimm & Bear It"	16:40

Vinyl edition bonus track
No.	Title	Length
4.	"Bremerton"	16:20
