= Southern Lord Records =

American record label

Southern Lord
- Founded: April 1998
- Founder: Greg Anderson
- Distributors: Universal Music/Virgin (United States), Southern (Europe)
- Genre: Extreme metal, experimental, heavy metal, hardcore punk
- Country of origin: United States
- Location: Los Angeles, California
- Official website: www.southernlord.com

Southern Lord is an American heavy metal record label that was founded in 1998 by Greg Anderson. It initially specialized in experimental metal: particularly doom metal, stoner rock, and drone metal. The label later expanded its line-up to include artists from black metal, hardcore punk and crust punk bands.

== History ==
Before co-founding their own record label Greg Anderson and Stephen O'Malley were friends and bandmates in Thorr's Hammer and Burning Witch. The pair formed a new band named Sunn O))) in 1998 and moved to Los Angeles. They started Southern Lord as a way to have control over the releases of their own recordings.

Southern Lord's first release was the CD version (previously released as a cassette) of Thorr’s Hammer‘s Dommedagsnatt—a doom/death metal album with Norwegian lyrics. The second release was: Burning Witch‘s Crippled Lucifer—a compilation CD of the band's first two EPs.

Southern Lord released material by Anderson and O'Malley's latest band, Sunn O))) in 2002. Sunn O))) was later reviewed several times by Ben Ratliff of The New York Times.

The label's roster continued to grow with notable doom releases such as Warhorse's As Heaven Turns to Ash, Place of Skulls Nailed and With Vision, as well as albums from Anderson's band Goatsnake. It also expanded its musical palate releasing music by: Darkest Hour, Orcustus, and Dave Grohl‘s side project Probot.

The band Earth joined the Southern Lord family in 2005—continuing Southern Lord's involvement in drone and doom music.

Releases from Earth, Sunn O))) (including the heavily lauded Monoliths & Dimensions), and a series of Boris 7″s to go along with the album Smile took place at the end of the decade.

== Notable artists ==
=== Current ===
- A Storm of Light
- Agrimonia
- All Pigs Must Die
- Baptists
- BL'AST
- Black Breath
- Black Cobra
- Burning Love
- Burning Witch
- Darkest Hour
- Eagle Twin
- Earth
- Excel
- Goatsnake
- High Command
- High on Fire
- Jesus Piece
- Loincloth
- Pelican
- Poison Idea
- Power Trip
- Ruin
- Sunn O)))
- Today Is the Day
- Unsane
- Wolfbrigade
- Xibalba

=== Former ===
- The Accüsed
- Attila Csihar
- Boris
- Capricorns
- Church of Misery
- Clown Alley
- Corrosion of Conformity
- Craft
- Early Graves
- Earthride
- Electric Wizard
- Final Warning
- From Ashes Rise
- Gore
- Grief
- Graves at Sea
- The Hidden Hand
- Internal Void
- Khanate
- Lair of the Minotaur
- Nachtmystium
- Nails
- Mondo Generator
- Nortt
- Nuclear Death
- The Obsessed
- Off!
- Om
- Orcustus
- Oren Ambarchi
- Outlaw Order
- Pentagram
- Place of Skulls
- Probot
- Saint Vitus
- Sleep
- Striborg
- Teeth of Lions Rule the Divine
- Thorr's Hammer
- Thou
- Thrones
- Trap Them
- Twilight
- The Want
- Warhorse
- Weedeater
- Wino
- Winter
- Wolves in the Throne Room
- Xasthur

== See also ==
- Southern Lord Records discography
- Lists of record labels
