= Drone metal =

Subgenre of heavy metal

- Other names: Drone doom
- Stylistic origins: Doom metal; drone music
- Cultural origins: Early 1990s, Washington, U.S.

Other topics
- Avant-garde metal; industrial metal; post-metal

Drone metal or drone doom is a style of heavy metal that melds the slow tempos and heaviness of doom metal with the long-duration tones of drone music. Drone metal is sometimes associated with post-metal or experimental metal.

== Characteristics ==
Typically, the electric guitar is performed with a large amount of reverb or audio feedback while vocals may or may not be present. Songs often lack beat or rhythm in the traditional sense and are typically very long. The experience of a drone metal performance has been compared by novelist John Wray in The New York Times to listening to an Indian raga in the middle of an earthquake. Wray also states, "It's hard to imagine any music being heavier or, for that matter, very much slower." A pioneer band of drone metal called Sunn O))) has indicated a kinship with sound sculpture. Jan Tumlir indicates a "sustained infra-sound rumble of sub-bass—so-called brown noise".

== History ==
=== Precursors ===
Early guitar-produced drone effects go as far back as the krautrock (for example Cluster II by Cluster, 1972) and early noise rock / industrial music era (Metal Machine Music by Lou Reed, 1975; Stahlwerksynfonie by Die Krupps, 1981).

=== 1990s ===
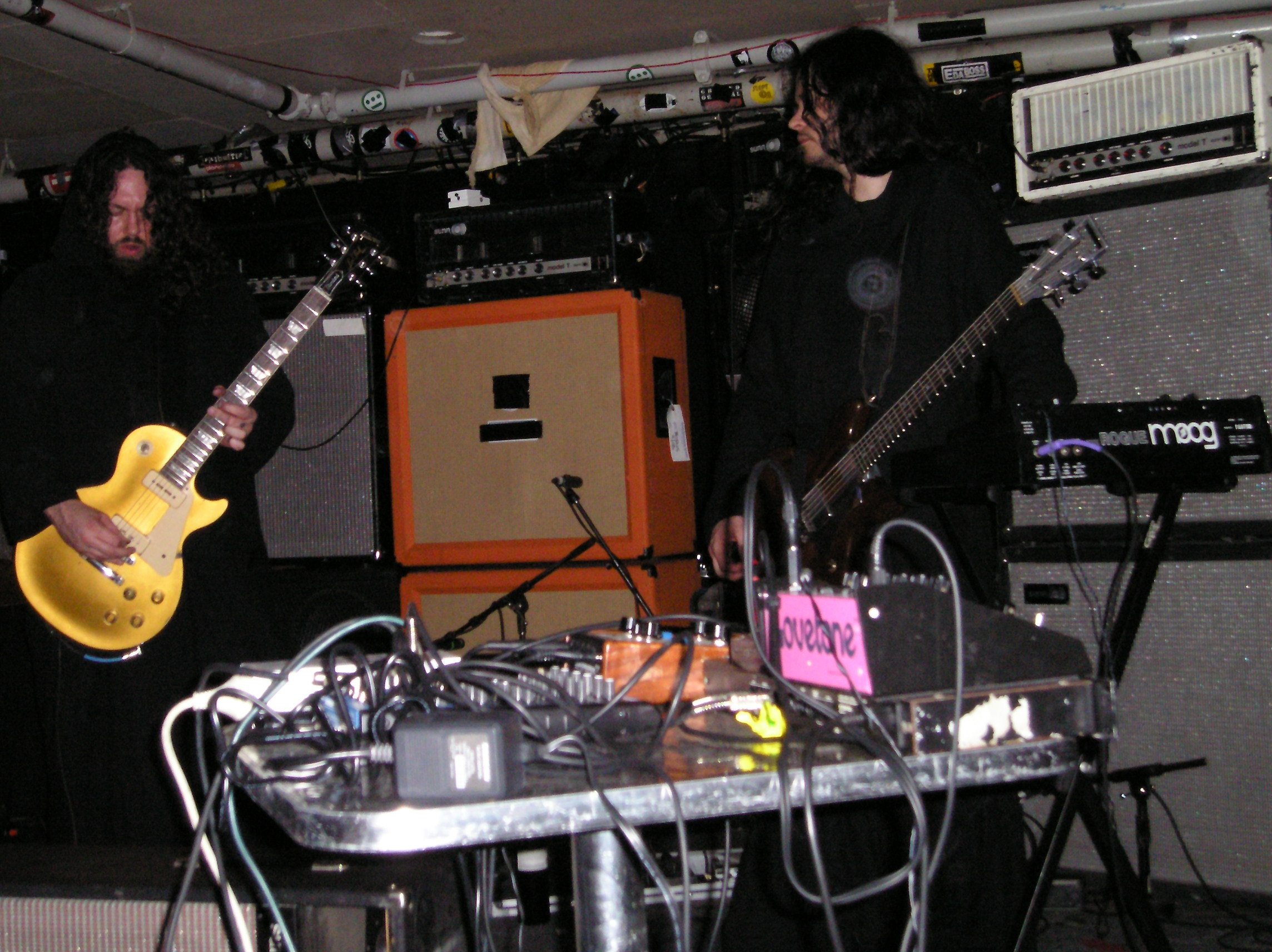
Sunn O))) at The Middle East in 2006

Drone metal was first established by Earth, a group from Olympia, Washington, formed in 1989 by minimalist musician Dylan Carlson, which has been described as "minimalist post-grunge". Earth took inspiration from the sludge metal of Melvins and the minimalist music of La Monte Young, Terry Riley and Tony Conrad. Stephen O'Malley's group Burning Witch, formed five years later, also in Seattle, continued in this tradition, incorporating unusual vocals and bursts of audio feedback. The group initially recorded for the prominent powerviolence label Slap-a-Ham. O'Malley's subsequent group, Sunn O))), initially formed as a tribute to Earth, is most responsible for the contemporary prominence of the drone metal style. Godflesh is also a stated influence on many groups. Boris, from Tokyo, also developed a style of drone metal, parallel with the Seattle groups, as did Corrupted, from Osaka.

=== 2000s ===
Nadja (Toronto), Locrian (US), Jesu (UK), Black Boned Angel (Wellington, New Zealand), Khanate (New York City), Ocean (Portland, Maine), Growing (New York City), KTL (Washington/London), Ascend and Eagle Twin (US), Teeth of Lions Rule the Divine (Nottingham, England), Conan (Liverpool, England) and Moss (Southampton, England) are prominent drone metal groups that formed in the early 21st century. Noise musicians, such as Kevin Drumm and Oren Ambarchi, have also worked in the style. Rhys Chatham's Essentialist project is a contribution to drone metal by an elder composer, attempting to "arrive at an a priori essence of heavy metal, reducing it to a basic chord progression".

== Connections with other art forms ==
Stephen O'Malley from Sunn O))) collaborated on an installation with artist Banks Violette, who has likened drone metal to the work of Donald Judd. Tumlir locates a precedent in Robert Rauschenberg. Violette points out, however, that drone metal is "as much a physiological phenomenon as an acoustic one", with an attendant physicality. O'Malley has also mentioned an appreciation for Cormac McCarthy and Richard Serra. Rhys Chatham's Essentialist included projections by Robert Longo. Jim Jarmusch's 2009 film The Limits of Control features music by a number of drone metal groups. Jarmusch said, "I love these kind of visual landscapes they make, and they really inspired things for me for my film ..., because when I write I'm listening to things that inspire me in the direction of whatever world I'm imagining. Boris and Sunn O))) and Earth were really instrumental in me just finding a place in my head."

== See also ==
- Doom metal
- Japanoise
- Noise rock
- Sludge metal
- Stoner metal

== Bibliography ==
- Coggins, Owen (2018). "Amplifier Worship: Materiality and Mysticism in Heavy Sound". Mysticism, Ritual, and Religion in Drone Metal. Bloomsbury Studies in Religion and Popular Music. London: Bloomsbury Academic. pp. 115–136. doi:10.5040/9781350025127.ch-005. ISBN 978-1-3500-2510-3.
- Coggins, Owen (June 2015). Walters, Barbara R. (ed.). "The Invocation at Tilburg: Mysticism, Implicit Religion, and Gravetemple's Drone Metal" (PDF). Implicit Religion: Journal for the Critical Study of Religion. 18 (2). London: Equinox Publishing: 209–231. doi:10.1558/imre.v18i2.27238. ISSN 1743-1697. S2CID 146358066. Archived (PDF) from the original on July 15, 2021.
