= Boris discography =

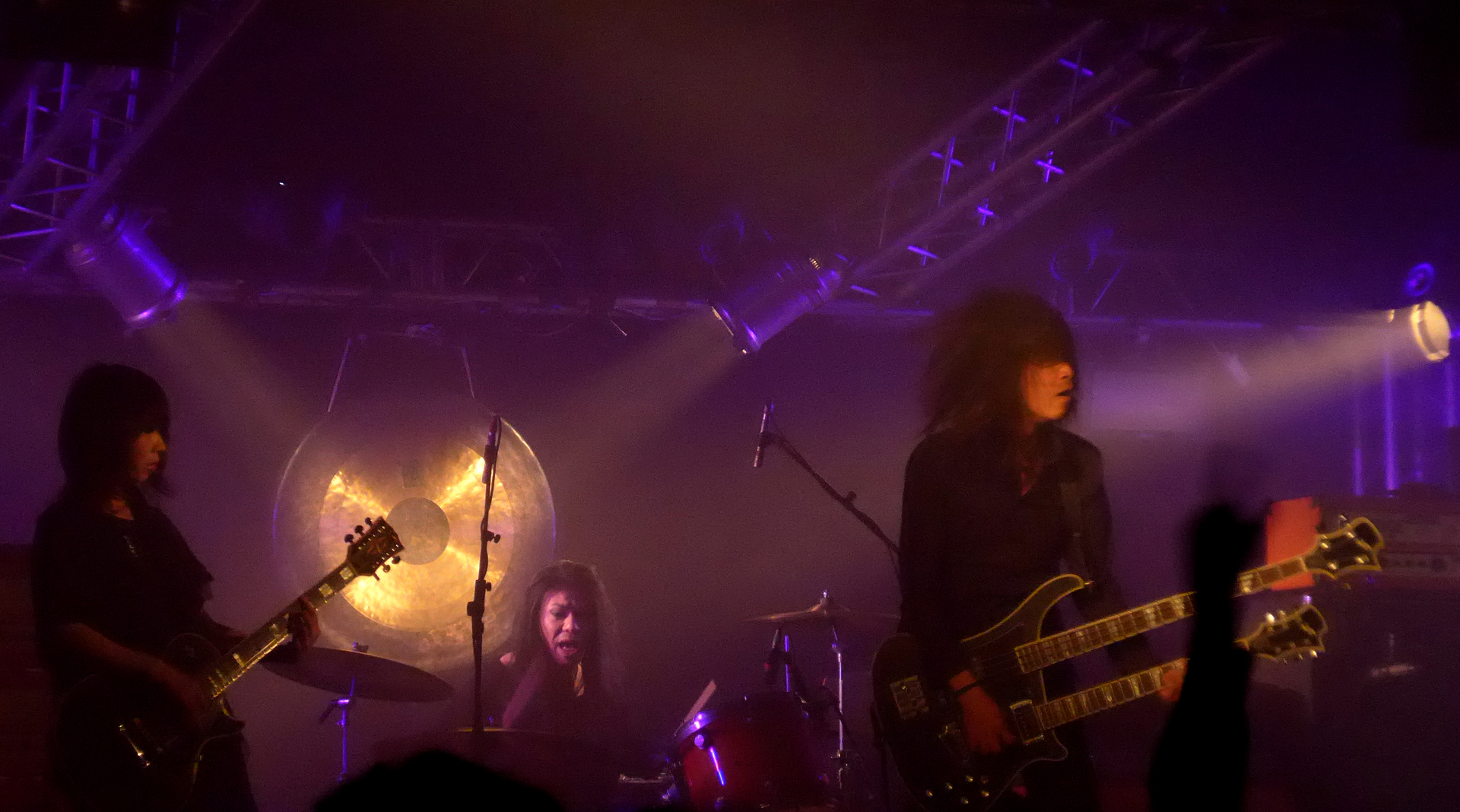
- Studio albums: 28
- Extended plays: 14
- Live albums: 7

The following is the discography of the Japanese experimental band Boris.

== Studio albums ==
List of studio albums, with selected chart positions
| Title | Album details | Peak chart positions | | | |
| Title | Album details | US Hard Rock | US Heat. | US Ind. | US Taste. |
|---|---|---|---|---|---|
| Absolutego (Note: Throughout their career, the band has stated that Absolutego was intended to be released as a single rather than a studio album, despite its length.) | Released: 1996; Label: Fangs Anal Satan; Formats: CD, LP | — | — | — | — |
| Amplifier Worship | Released: 26 November 1998; Label: Mangrove; Formats: CD, LP | — | — | — | — |
| Flood | Released: 15 December 2000; Label: MIDI Creative; Format: CD, LP | — | — | — | — |
| Heavy Rocks | Released: 26 April 2002; Label: Quattro / UK Discs; Format: CD, LP | — | — | — | — |
| Akuma no Uta | Released: 6 June 2003; Label: Diwphalanx; Formats: CD, LP, digital download | — | — | — | — |
| Boris at Last -Feedbacker- | Released: 25 December 2003; Label: Diwphalanx, Conspiracy Records; Formats: CD, LP, digital download | — | — | — | — |
| The Thing Which Solomon Overlooked | Released: August 2004; Label: Kult of Nihilow; Format: LP | — | — | — | — |
| Dronevil | Released: 28 February 2005; Label: Misanthropic Agenda; Formats: CD, LP | — | — | — | — |
| Soundtrack from the Film Mabuta no Ura | Released: 29 June 2005; Label: Inoxia Records, Catune Records, Essence Records; Formats: CD, LP | — | — | — | — |
| Pink | Released: 18 November 2005; Label: Diwphalanx Records; Formats: CD, LP, digital download | — | — | — | 25 |
| The Thing Which Solomon Overlooked 2 | Released: 9 April 2006; Label: Conspiracy Records; Format: LP | — | — | — | — |
| The Thing Which Solomon Overlooked 3 | Released: 9 April 2006; Label: Conspiracy Records; Format: LP | — | — | — | — |
| Vein | Released: 3 October 2006; Label: Important Records; Format: LP | — | — | — | — |
| Smile | Released: 7 March 2008; Label: Diwphalanx Records; Formats: CD, LP, digital download | — | 20 | — | — |
| New Album | Released: 16 March 2011; Label: Tearbridge, Daymare Records, Sargent House; Formats: CD, LP, digital download | — | — | — | — |
| Heavy Rocks | Released: 24 May 2011; Label: Sargent House; Formats: CD, LP | 25 | 11 | — | 18 |
| Attention Please | Released: 24 May 2011; Label: Sargent House; Formats: CD, LP | — | 12 | — | 19 |
| Präparat | Released: 6 March 2013; Label: Daymare Recordings; Format: LP | — | — | — | — |
| Noise | Released: 17 June 2014; Label: Sargent House, Daymare Recordings; Formats: CD, LP, digital download | 16 | 8 | 35 | 20 |
| The Thing Which Solomon Overlooked Extra | Released: 15 September 2014; Label: Taiga Records; Format: LP | — | — | — | — |
| Urban Dance | Released: 2 May 2015; Label: Fangs Anal Satan, New Noise Literacy; Format: CD | — | — | — | — |
| Warpath | Released: 2 May 2015; Label: Fangs Anal Satan, New Noise Literacy; Format: CD | — | — | — | — |
| Asia | Released: 2 May 2015; Label: Fangs Anal Satan, New Noise Literacy; Format: CD | — | — | — | — |
| Dear | Released: 14 July 2017; Label: Sargent House, Daymare Recordings; Formats: CD, LP, digital download | — | 14 | 25 | 22 |
| LφVE & EVφL | Released: 4 October 2019; Label: Third Man Records; Formats: CD, LP, digital download | — | 23 | — | — |
| NO | Released: 3 July 2020; Label: Fangs Anal Satan; Format: CD, LP, digital download | — | — | — | — |
| W | Released: 21 January 2022; Label: Sacred Bones Records; Format: CD, LP, digital download | — | — | — | — |
| Heavy Rocks | Released: 12 August 2022; Label: Relapse Records; Format: CD, LP, digital download | — | — | — | — |
| Fade | Released: 2 December 2022; Label: Fangs Anal Satan; Format: 2xLP, digital download | — | — | — | — |
"—" denotes items which did not chart.

== Live albums ==
- Boris Archive 3CD (2005 aRCHIVE)
- Smile: Live at Wolf Creek 2CD (2008 Diwphalanx Records)
- Smile: Live in Prague 2LP (2009 Conspiracy Records†)
- Boris / Variations + Live in Japan CD + DVD (2010 Daymare Recordings / DIWPHALANX)
- Archive II (2014 Daymare)
- Crossing Waltz (2016 FangsAnalSatan)
- eternity (2018 FangsAnalSatan)

== EPs, singles and demos ==
- "Demo Vol. 1" 2x Cassette (1993, FangsAnalSatan)
- "Demo Vol. 3" Cassette (1994, FangsAnalSatan)
- "1970" 7-inch (2002, Inoxia Records)
- "A Bao A Qu" 7-inch picture disc (2005, SuperFi Records)
- "Statement" 7-inch (2008, Southern Lord Records)
- "Message" 12-inch (2008, Diwphalanx Records)
- "Japanese Heavy Rock Hits v1-4" 7-inch (2009, Southern Lord Records)
- "Black Original Remix" 12-inch (2011, Catune)
- "Looprider Remix" 12-inch (2012, Catune)
- "Cosmos" 3x file (2012, Invada)
- Mr. Shortkill 12-inch (2016, Daymare Recordings)
- "Phenomenons Drive" 12-inch (2018, Hello From The Gutter)
- Tears E.P. CD (2019, Trash-Up!! Records)
- "Boris" 12-inch (2020, Fangs Anal Satan)
- "Heavy Rocks" 7-inch (2022, KiliKiliVilla)
- "Pink" 7-inch (2022, KiliKiliVilla)
- "Smile" 7-inch (2022, KiliKiliVilla)
- "New Album" 7-inch (2022, KiliKiliVilla)
- "Kuruimizu" 7-inch flexi (2022, Fangs Anal Satan / Wake Brewing)
- "Noise" 7-inch (2022, KiliKiliVilla)
- "Dear" 7-inch (2022, KiliKiliVilla)
- "Christmas" 7-inch + box (2022, KiliKiliVilla)

== Concert films/Music videos ==
Music videos have been produced for several of Boris' songs, usually by the Japanese production company Foodunited.

- "Hama"
- "Kuruimizu"
- "Ibitsu"
- "Furi"
- "Korosu"
- "1970"
- "A Bao A Qu"
- "The Evil One Which Sobs (Remix)"
- "Pink"
- "Rainbow"
- "Statement"
- "My Neighbour Satan"
- "Heavy Metal Addict"
- "Hope/Riot Sugar"
- "Vanilla"
- "The Power"
- "Absolutego"
- "Dōshitemo Anata o Yurusenai"
- "Love"
- "Shadow of Skull"
- "Anti-Gone"
- "鏡 (Zerkalo)"
- "Reincarnation Rose"
- "Drowning by Numbers"
- "Beyond Good & Evil"
- "She Is Burning"
- "My Name Is Blank"
- "prologue sansaro"
- "Nosferatou"
- "Michikusa"
- "Not Surprised"

== Collaborations ==
=== Merzbow collaborations ===
Boris have a well-established history of collaboration with Japanoise artist Merzbow. Thus far, three of the collaborations with Merzbow have been full-length albums, one of them is a 12-inch EP, and the last two are live albums.

- Megatone CD (2002 Inoxia Records)
- 04092001 LP (2004 Inoxia Records)
- Sun Baked Snow Cave CD (2005 Hydra Head Records)
- Walrus/Groon 12-inch EP (2007 Hydra Head Records)
- Rock Dream 2CD/3LP (2007 Diwphalanx Records/Southern Lord Records)
- Klatter LP (2011 Daymare Records)
- Gensho CD/LP (2016 Relapse/Daymare)
- 2R0I2P0 CD/LP (2020 Relapse)

=== Other collaborations ===
- Black: Implication Flooding (with Keiji Haino) CD (1998 Inoxia Records)
- Altar (with Sunn O)))) CD/2CD/3LP (2006 Southern Lord Records/Inoxia Records/Daymare Records)
- Rainbow (with Michio Kurihara) CD (2006/2007 Pedal Records/Drag City)
- Cloud Chamber (with Michio Kurihara) CD (2008 Pedal Records)
- BXI EP (with Ian Astbury) CD/LP (2010 Southern Lord Records)
- EROS (with Endon) Cassette (2015 fangsanalsatan/New Noise Literacy)/LP (2016 Daymare Recordings)
- Low End Meeting (with GOTH-TRAD) CD/12" (2015 fangsanalsatan)
- Refrain (with Z.O.A) CD/LP (2020 Fangs Anal Satan)

== Split recordings ==
- Boris/Barebones Split EP – 10-inch/CD (1996, Piranha Records/Fangsanalsatan)
- Boris/Tomsk 7 Split EP – 7-inch (1997, Bovine Records)
- More Echoes, Touching Air Landscape – (with Choukoku no Niwa) CD (1999, Inoxia Records)
- Boris/The Dudley Corporation Split EP – 7-inch (2003, Scientific Labs)
- Long Hair and Tights – (with Doomriders) 2LP (2007, Daymare Recordings)
- Damaged split EP + DVD – (with Stupid Babies Go Mad) 10-inch (2007, Diwphalanx Records)
- She's So Heavy – Wata/Ai Aso split 7-inch (2007, Diwphalanx Records)
- Chapter Ahead Being Fake – Torche/Boris split 10-inch/CD (2010/2009, Hydra Head/Daymare Recording)
- Golden Dance Classics – 9dw/Boris split vinyl and CD (2009, Catune)
- Boris/Saade – Boris/Saade split vinyl 12-inch (2011, KYEO)
- Asobi Seksu x Boris – Asobi Seksu/Boris split vinyl 7-inch (2012, Sargent House)
- Boris/Joe Volk – Boris/Joe Volk split vinyl 12-inch (2012, Invada)
- Boris/Heap Split Single – 7-inch (2014, Baked Goods)
- Rocky & The Sweden/Boris - split EP (2022, Relapse Records)
- Twins Of Evil - Melvins & Boris split (2024, Amphetamine Reptile Records)

== Video releases ==
- Hama VHS Promo (1998 Foodunited)
- Live at Shimokitazawa Shelter DVD (2003 Diwphalanx Records)
- Bootleg -Feedbacker- DVD (2005 Diwphalanx Records)
- Heavy Metal Me DVD (2005 Diwphalanx Records)
- Live in Japan DVD (2011 Southern Lord)

== Other releases ==
- Wizard's Convention: Japanese Heavy Rock Showcase – DVD (2005 Diwphalanx Records)
- Buzz In A.V/Scion Remix – (promo with Todd Edward, Mixhell, Optimo, NosaijThing; 2009 A.V/Scion)
- Statement Promo CD – promo (2008 Inoxia Records)
- 1985 – compilation of studio outtakes from 2011 (2019 Fangs Anal Satan)

== Compilation appearances ==
=== Exclusive songs ===
These songs are available only on the compilations.

- "Water Porch" on Take Care of Scabbard Fish CD (1994 Scabbard Fish)
  The above song was actually Boris' recorded debut.
- "Mosquito" (studio version) on Eat the Chaos CD (1995 Thank You Record Co.)
- "Vacuuum" on From Koenji to Eternity CD (1996 Inoxia)
- "Me and the Devil Blues" on Up Jumped the Devil: Tribute to Robert Johnson CD (2000 P-Vine)
- "Dronevil" on Mangrove2002 CD (2002 Mangrove)
- "Froggie Bee Baa" on Merzbow: Frog Remixed & Revisited 2CD (2003 Misanthropic Agenda)
- "You Were Holding An Umbrella" (live 10/16/07 at Echoplex, LA) on Invocation of Sacred Resonance I (2008 Southern Lord Records)
- "Slither" on Doggy Style: The Dogs Tribute 2xCD (2008 Future Now)
- "Slither (Alternative Version)" on Doggy Style: The Dogs Tribute 2xCD (2008 Future Now)
- "Blood Swamp (Tloc Edit)" on Limits of Control [SOUNDTRACK] CD (2009 Lakeshore Records)
- "(Tloc Edit)" on Limits of Control [SOUNDTRACK] CD (2009 Lakeshore Records)
- "Sometimes" on Yellow Loveless [Tribute to My Bloody Valentine] CD (2013 High Fader Records)
- "Lithium" (originally by Nirvana; tribute album Whatever Nevermind) (2015, Robotic Empire)

== Samplers ==
These are tracks taken from other Boris albums.

- "Huge" on Let There Be Doom CD (2003 Southern Lord Records) Originally from Amplifier Worship
- "A Bao A Qu" on Darkness Hath No Boundaries CD (2006 Southern Lord Records) Originally from Mabuta no Ura
- "A Bao A Qu" and "Etna" on Darkness Knows No Boundaries CD (2006 Southern Lord Records) Originally from Mabuta no Ura and Altar (with Sunn O)))) respectively
- "The Sinking Belle (Blue Sheep)" on Mind The Gap Vol. 65 CD (2006 Gonzo Circus) Originally from Altar (with Sunn O))))
- "My Machine" on Walkabout CD (2007 Endless Flight) Originally from Pink
- "Farewell" on Within the Church of Thee Overlords CD (2007 Southern Lord Records) Originally from Pink
