= Rock Dream =

Live album by Boris with Merzbow
- Released: October 26, 2007
- Recorded: November 2006 in Tokyo
- Length: 110:30
- Label: Diwphalanx

Boris with Merzbow chronology
| Sun Baked Snow Cave (2005) | Rock Dream (2007) | Walrus / Groon (2007) |

Boris chronology
| She's So Heavy (2007) | Rock Dream (2007) | Smile (2008) |

Merzbow chronology
| Peace for Animals (2007) | Rock Dream (2007) | Live Destruction at No Fun 2007 (2008) |

US Cover
- Southern Lord version cover

Rock Dream is a collaborative live album between Japanese band Boris and Japan noise musician Merzbow.

== Production ==
Rock Dream was recorded live in November 2006 at Tokyo's Earthdom festival.

== Style ==
Thom Jurek of AllMusic noted that the album was nothing like Sun Baked Snow Cave, a previous collaboration between Boris and Merzbow. Jurek noted that the music was not a "free-form improvisation and noise fest".

== Release ==
Rock Dream was released on October 26, 2007, on the Japanese music label Diwphalanx Records.

The American label Southern Lord released the album in 2008 on compact disc and vinyl. The vinyl version includes the track "Dyno-Saur" that is not included on either version of CD releases. The American version had packaging designed by Stephen O'Malley, with their printer stating that they "never ever make anything like this again as it was painfully time-consuming and took forever to get just right!" This was a limited release with the label stating that there were "a little over 3800" manufactured in total.

== Reception ==
Professional ratings
Review scores
| Source | Rating |
|---|---|
| AllMusic | 4/5 stars |
| Austin Chronicle | 4/5 stars |

The Austin Chronicle discussed the album in their overview of Boris' career, declaring it "definitive live document, an impossibly dense double album that touches down on nearly every point of their career, from Dronevil to Smile's contorted stairway to heaven ("Flower Sun Rain"), with Merzbow's electronic manipulations stitching it all together like connective scar tissue." In 2008, Raoul Hernandez of the Austin Chronicle placed Rock Dream on his list of top ten albums of 2007.

In a retrospective review from Tiny Mix Tapes, declared Rock Dream to be "not just the best album Boris ever made, but also one of the finest live albums I’ve ever heard." and that "It’s incredible then that someone recorded Boris and Merzbow that night, because for two hours they got to be the best band on the planet."

== Track listing ==
=== CD version ===
Disc one
| No. | Title | Length |
|---|---|---|
| 1. | "Feedbacker" (Originally from Boris at Last: -Feedbacker-) | 35:05 |
| 2. | "Blackout" (Originally from Pink) | 5:19 |
| 3. | "Evil Stack" | 5:04 |
| 4. | "Rainbow" (Originally from Rainbow) | 4:30 |
| Total length: | | 49:58 |

Disc two
| No. | Title | Length |
|---|---|---|
| 1. | "Pink" (Originally from Pink) | 4:14 |
| 2. | "Woman on the Screen" (Originally from Pink) | 2:37 |
| 3. | "Nothing Special" (Originally from Pink) | 2:14 |
| 4. | "Ibitsu" (Originally from Akuma no Uta) | 3:35 |
| 5. | "A Bao A Qu" (Originally from Sound Track from Film "Mabuta no Ura") | 4:35 |
| 6. | "The Evilone Which Sobs" (Originally from Dronevil) | 13:41 |
| 7. | "Flower Sun Rain" (PYG cover, later released on Smile) | 8:04 |
| 8. | "Just Abandoned My-self" (Originally from Pink) | 13:21 |
| 9. | "Farewell" (Originally from Pink) | 8:11 |
| Total length: | | 60:32 |

=== LP version ===
Side one
| No. | Title | Length |
|---|---|---|
| 1. | "Feedbacker (Part One)" |

Side two
| No. | Title | Length |
|---|---|---|
| 1. | "Feedbacker (Part Two)" |
| 2. | "Black Out" |

Side three
| No. | Title | Length |
|---|---|---|
| 1. | "Evil Stack" |
| 2. | "Rainbow" |
| 3. | "Pink" |
| 4. | "Woman on the Screen" |
| 5. | "Nothing Special" |
| 6. | "Ibitsu" |

Side four
| No. | Title | Length |
|---|---|---|
| 1. | "A Bao A Qu" |
| 2. | "The Evilone Which Sobs" |

Side five
| No. | Title | Length |
|---|---|---|
| 1. | "Flower Sun Rain" |
| 2. | "Just Abandon My-self" |

Side six
| No. | Title | Length |
|---|---|---|
| 1. | "Farewell" |
| 2. | "Dyna-saur" (Bonus track, Originally from Heavy Rocks) |

== Personnel ==
Merzbow with Boris

- Takeshi – vocals, bass, guitar
- Wata – vocals, guitar, echo
- Atsuo – drums, percussion, vocals
- Masami Akita – EMS Synthi A, computer, hand made instruments, effects

Production

- Yasuaki Satake – P.A engineer
- Kazu – recording
- Souichiro Nakamura at Peace Music – mixing, mastering
- Fangsanalsatan – design [Diwphalanx]
- Shizu – drawing [Diwphalanx]
- SOMA – design [Southern Lord]
- Thomas Hooper – drawing [Southern Lord]
- Miki Matsushima – photo [Southern Lord]
