= Smile (Boris album) =

Studio album by Boris
- Released: March 7, 2008
- Recorded: 2007
- Length: 61:42
- Label: Diwphalanx Records; Southern Lord Records (SUNN92)

Boris chronology
Rock Dream (2007)	Smile (2008)	New Album (2011)

US Version cover
- Southern Lord Recordings, 2008

Singles from Smile
- 1. "Message" Released: March 4, 2008; 2. "Statement" Released: 2008

Professional ratings
Review scores
Source	Rating
Allmusic	link
Decibel	9/10 stars
Sonic Frontiers	(favorable) link
Pitchfork Media	(6.4/10)

Smile is the thirteenth studio album by Japanese band Boris. It was released through Diwphalanx Records in early 2008 (late 2008 for the live version accordingly), featuring guest musicians Michio Kurihara of Ghost and Stephen O'Malley of Sunn O))), both of whom have collaborated with Boris in the past. Shortly after this initial release, the album was released by American label Southern Lord with a slightly different track listing, different artwork (by Stephen O'Malley), and an almost entirely different sound. The first 3000 copies of this edition include a DVD containing videos for "Statement", "Pink" and "My Neighbor Satan".

Notably, this release is the second Boris album to feature vocals on every track (the first, excluding any one-track albums, was Amplifier Worship). Also, it delves more into experimental tendencies with a more manipulated sound, use of drum machines, and even experiments with sampled tracks (notably, "Dead Destination" is essentially "No Ones Grieve part 2" from The Thing Which Solomon Overlooked 2 with additional vocals; part of the seventh song from Vein is used in the untitled final track).

The album can also be seen as humorous since Boris have referenced this album in an interview with Terrorizer Magazine as "un-cool" and "The sell-out album" with comical lyricism (A prime example being the song "Buzz-In" which is about the Melvins live video Salad of a Thousand Delights), an 80s look for the band themselves, and the tones of voice in some of the songs.

The album charted on the Billboard Top Heatseekers chart at number 20.

== Track listing ==
The different versions of Smile contain different mixes: the English version was mixed by Souichiro Nakamura, while the Japanese version was handled by You Ishihara.

=== Diwphalanx CD ===
No.	Title	Length
1.	"Messeeji" ("メッセージ", "Message")	7:06
2.	"Buzz-In"	2:34
3.	"Hanate!" ("放て!", "Shoot!" ("Laser Beam" on English version))	5:02
4.	"Hana, Taiyou, Ame" ("花・太陽・雨", "Flower, Sun, Rain"; cover of the song by Pyg)	5:35
5.	"Tonari No Sataan" ("となりのサターン", "Next Saturn" ("My Neighbor Satan" on English version))	5:20
6.	"Kare Hateta Saki" ("枯れ果てた先", "Dead Destination" ("Ka Re Ha Te Ta Sa Ki -No Ones Grieve-" on English version))	7:26
7.	"Kimi wa Kasa o Sashiteita" ("君は傘をさしていた", "You Were Holding an Umbrella")	9:19
8.	Untitled	19:20

=== Disk Union vinyl ===
Limited to 500 copies.

Side A
No.	Title	Length
1.	"Messeeji" ("メッセージ", "Statement")	7:06
2.	"Buzz-In"	2:34
3.	"Hanate!" ("放て!", "Shoot!")	5:02

Side B
No.	Title	Length
1.	"Hana, Taiyou, Ame" ("花・太陽・雨", "Flower, Sun, Rain"; cover of the song by Pyg)	5:35
2.	"Tonari No Sataan" ("となりのサターン", "Next Saturn" ("My Neighbor Satan" on English version))	5:20

Side C
No.	Title	Length
1.	"Kare Hateta Saki" ("枯れ果てた先", "Dead Destination")	7:26
2.	"Kimi wa Kasa o Sashiteita" ("君は傘をさしていた", "You Were Holding an Umbrella")	9:19

Side D
No.	Title	Length
1.	Untitled (with Stephen O'Malley)	19:20

=== Southern Lord CD ===
No.	Title	Length
1.	"Flower Sun Rain" (with Michio Kurihara; cover of the song by Pyg, "Hana, Taiyou, Ame" on Japanese version)	7:26
2.	"Buzz-In"	2:57
3.	"Laser Beam" ("Hanate!" on Japanese version)	4:29
4.	"Statement" ("Messeeji" on Japanese version)	3:24
5.	"My Neighbor Satan" (with Michio Kurihara; "Tonari no Sataan" on Japanese version)	5:17
6.	"Ka Re Ha Te Ta Sa Ki—No Ones Grieve" ("Kare Hateta Saki" on Japanese version)	8:58
7.	"You Were Holding an Umbrella" (with Michio Kurihara; "Kimi wa Kasa o Sashiteita" on Japanese version)	8:54
8.	Untitled (with Stephen O'Malley)	15:28

=== Southern Lord vinyl ===
Several limited-run colors of the Southern Lord vinyl have been released: clear orange (7000 copies), opaque orange (1000 copies), grey (1000 copies), yellow (1000 copies), and black (3000 copies). All versions contain the same music. The mixes here are similar to the Southern Lord CD release but the duration of some tracks have been changed, in part due to the addition of two bonus tracks.

Side A
No.	Title	Length
1.	"Statement"	3:24
2.	"Buzz-In"	2:57
3.	"Laser Beam" (slightly shortened due to bonus track "After Me")	3:46
4.	"Vein" (full version sampled in the CD version of "Untitled")	2:33

Side B
No.	Title	Length
1.	"My Neighbor Satan" (alternate solos, also used for the music video)	5:22
2.	"Ka Re Ha Te Ta Sa Ki -No Ones Grieve-"	8:58

Side C
No.	Title	Length
1.	"Flower Sun Rain" (full length version)	7:50
2.	"You Were Holding an Umbrella"	8:54
3.	"After Me" (the end of "Laser Beam" CD version)	1:59

Side D
No.	Title	Length
1.	Untitled (full length version, with "Vein" removed)	19:17

=== Southern Lord bonus DVD ===
The bonus DVD came with certain limited editions of the Southern Lord CD, limited to 3000 copies. It features three official music videos.

No.	Title	Length
1.	"Statement"	3:25
2.	"My Neighbour Satan"	5:19
3.	"Pink"	4:24

=== "Choice Cuts" Amazon exclusive drop-card ===
All copies of Smile sold through Amazon.com received this additional free download-only collection.

No.	Title	Length
1.	"Hama" (from Amplifier Worship)	7:31
2.	"Akuma no Uta" (from Akuma no Uta)	4:01
3.	"Ibitsu" (from Akuma no Uta)	3:22
4.	"Pink" (from Pink)	4:20
5.	"Farewell" (from Pink)	7:33
6.	"The Sinking Belle (Blue Sheep)" (from Altar)	7:38
7.	"Rainbow (live on October 16, 2007 at Echoplex, Los Angeles with Michio Kurihara)" (from Rainbow)	5:09
8.	"You Were Holding an Umbrella (live on October 16, 2007 at Echoplex, Los Angeles with Michio Kurihara)"	11:16

== Personnel ==
- Takeshi - guitar, bass guitar, vocals
- Wata - guitar, vocals
- Atsuo - drums, percussion, vocals
- Michio Kurihara - guitar on "My Neighbour Satan", "Flower, Sun, Rain", and "You Were Holding An Umbrella"
- Stephen O'Malley - guitar on "Untitled"
