= Boris Archive =

Live album by Boris
- Released: 2005
- Recorded: 1996–2001
- Genres: Drone doom, noise rock
- Length: 131:25 (total); 46:00 (volume one); 47:57 (volume two); 37:28 (volume three)
- Label: aRCHIVE
- Producer: Scott Slimm

Boris chronology
Sound Track from Film "Mabuta no Ura" (2005)	Boris Archive (2005)	Pink (2005)

Professional ratings
Review scores
Source	Rating
AllMusic	(volume one)
AllMusic	(volume two)
AllMusic	(volume three)

Boris Archive is a three-disc collection of live material by Japanese band Boris. The first disc comprises various live renditions of older songs and material from Amplifier Worship and the Boris/Barebones split EP. The second disc is three drumless drone songs. The third disc is a live set consisting of the 65-minute Absolutego and the 70-minute Flood played back-to-back in 37 minutes. Altogether, 600 copies of each disc were pressed with the intention of being sold individually. However, due to strong demand for all three, a set consisting of an obi-style horizontal slipcase enclosing the three discs was created and limited to 320 copies.

All three discs were re-released together in 2013 through Daymare Recordings with new artwork.

== Disc 1: "Live 96–98" ==
No.	Title	Length
1.	"Huge"	10:34
2.	"In Hush"	0:52
3.	"Soul Search You Sleep"	8:47
4.	"Vacuum"	1:43
5.	"Mosquite"	3:16
6.	"Mass Mercury"	8:05
7.	"Scar Box"	4:14
8.	"Hama"	8:29
Total length:		46:00

== Recording ==
- Tracks 1–2 recorded December 21, 1996 at Koenji 20000V
- Tracks 3–5 recorded June 21, 1996 at Koenji 20000V
- Tracks 6–7 recorded October 4, 1997 at Shinjyuku Loft
- Track 8 recorded August 2, 1998 at Koenji 20000V

== Disc 2: "Drumless Shows" ==
No.	Title	Length
1.	"Huge"	17:24
2.	"Mosquito"	20:10
3.	"Vomit Yourself"	10:23
Total length:		47:57

== Recording ==
- Track 1 recorded August 9, 1997, at Nagoya Music Farm
- Tracks 2–3 recorded August 8, 1997, at Koenji 20000V

== Disc 3: "2 Long Songs" ==
No.	Title	Length
1.	"Absolutego"	15:06
2.	"Flood"	22:22
Total length:		37:28

== Recording ==
- Recorded May 3, 2001 at Koenji 20000V

== Pressing history ==
Year	Label	Format	Country	Out of print?	Notes
2005	aRCHIVE	3CD	U.S.	Yes	Ltd. 600. 320 have a striped OBI strip to hold them together
