= Präparat =

Studio album by Boris
- Released: March 6, 2013
- Genre: Experimental rock
- Length: 40:39
- Label: Daymare Recordings
- Producers: Boris, Shinobu Narita

Boris chronology
| Attention Please (2011) | Präparat (2013) | Noise (2014) |

Professional ratings
Review scores
| Source | Rating |
|---|---|
| Pop Matters | 7/10 stars |

Präparat is the seventeenth studio album by the Japanese experimental band Boris. The album was announced on March 6, 2013, along with two other releases. Präparat features the participation of musicians like Michio Kurihara and Gisèle Vienne. It was first released exclusively on vinyl and only in Japan, and it sold out upon release. A second limited domestic pressing was released on April 28, 2014. Since October 2, 2020, it has also been available as a digital release on Bandcamp.

"Evil Stack 3" is part of a series of drone pieces across multiple Boris albums, including the Damaged split and Rock Dream.{{Citation needed}}

== Track listing ==
Side A
| No. | Title | Length |
|---|---|---|
| 1. | "December" | 03:58 |
| 2. | "哀歌" ("Elegy") | 04:23 |
| 3. | "Evil Stack 3" | 00:58 |
| 4. | "砂時計" ("Monologue") | 04:32 |
| 5. | "Method of Error" | 07:15 |

Side B
| No. | Title | Length |
|---|---|---|
| 6. | "Bataille Sucre" | 04:38 |
| 7. | "Perforated Line" | 00:34 |
| 8. | "コップの内側" ("Castel in the Air"; misspelling of "Castle"; kept on re-releases.) | 00:07 |
| 9. | "Mirano" | 02:29 |
| 10. | "カンヴァス" ("Canvas") | 04:30 |
| 11. | "Maeve" | 08:34 |

== Personnel ==
- Takeshi - vocals, guitar, and bass
- Wata - guitar and echo
- Atsuo - vocals, percussion, and electronics
- Michio Kurihara - guitar ("Evil Stack 3" and "Method of Error")
- Gisèle Vienne - spoken word ("Bataille Sucre")
- Composition, lyrics, and production by Boris
- Recording, mixing, photography, and design by Fangsanalsatan
- Mastering by Soichiro Nakamura
- Shinobu Narita - production ("Elegy" and "Canvas")
- Tadashi Hamada - management
