= Greenmachine =

Japanese metal band

- Origin: Japan
- Genres: Sludge metal, stoner metal
- Years active: 1995–1999; 2003–2007
- Labels: Man's Ruin, Diwphalanx
- Members: Datsu; Hasegawa; Monzawa
- Past members: Daisaku

Greenmachine (グリーンマシーン, Gurīnmashīn) was a Japanese stoner/sludge metal band founded in 1995.

== History ==
Greenmachine named themselves after the Kyuss song "Green Machine", the second track on Blues for the Red Sun. In 1995 they released their debut album, D.A.M.N., on Man's Ruin Records. They followed with The Earth Beater two years later, also on Man's Ruin. They disbanded in 1999 but resurfaced in 2003 with a new bass player and released The Archives of Rotten Blues on Diwphalanx Records. Diwphalanx also reissued the two Man's Ruin albums with bonus tracks in 2003. They played The Wizard's Convention in 2005 and are featured on the DVD along with fellow Japanese artists Boris, Church of Misery and Eternal Elysium. The band disbanded again in 2007 after the Wizard's Convention show, with their latest DVD release, This is the End, documenting their final show.

== Members ==
- Datsu - drums
- Hasegawa - bass/vocals
- Monzawa - guitar/vocals

== Discography ==
=== Studio albums ===
- D.A.M.N. CD (Man's Ruin Records 1997)
- The Earth Beater CD/10" (Man's Ruin Records 1999)
- The Archives of Rotten Blues CD (Diwphalanx Records 2004)

=== Singles ===
- Split 7" with Thug (Bovine Records 1997)

=== Reissue ===
- D.A.M.N. +3 CD (Diwphalanx Records 2003)
- The Earth Beater +3 CD (Diwphalanx Records 2003)

=== Live ===
- Wizard's Convention: Japanese Heavy Rock Showcase DVD (Diwphalanx Records 2005)
- This Is the End 061008 DVD (Diwphalanx Records 2007)
