= Eternal Elysium =

Japanese doom metal band

- Origin: Nagoya, Japan
- Genres: Doom metal, stoner metal
- Years active: 1991–present
- Labels: MeteorCity, Diwphalanx, Cornucopia
- Members: Yukito Okazaki; Tana Haugo; Antonio Ishikawa
- Past members: Atsutoshi Tachimoto; Jiro Murakami; Jun Kawasaki; Yashuhiro Okada; Eiichi Okuyama; Takashi Kuroda; Tom Huskinson; Toshiaki Umemura

Eternal Elysium (エターナル・イリジアム, Etānaru Erishiumu) are a Japanese doom metal band founded in 1991.

== History ==
Eternal Elysium have recorded six albums and six splits/EPs over their career. They were formed in 1991 by guitarist/vocalist Yukito Okazaki and have gone through numerous line-up changes over the years. Okazaki was joined by bassist Atsutoshi Tachimoto and drummer Jiro Murakami for some demo recordings and the first album, Faithful. In 1993 both Tachimoto and Murakami departed in Okazaki enlisted a new rhythm section consisting of bassist Jun Kawasaki and drummer Yashuhiro Okada. This line-up soon folded and Okaziki brought in Eiichi Okuyama on bass and Takashi Kuroda on drums. This line-up was put on hold when Okazaki fell ill and had to cancel tour plans. By 1997 the band was back and recorded songs for a slew of compilation albums, including At the Mountains of Madness and I Am Vengeance.

In 2000 Eternal Elysium signed to MeteorCity and released their second album, Spiritualized D. Okuyama left in mid 2000 and was replaced by bassist Toshiaki Umemura and Kuroda left in 2002 shortly before the recording the band's third album, Share. Rio Okuya was brought in to record some percussion for the album before drummer Tom Huskinson was found and brought in to finish the recording. The band released a split with Of the Spacistor in 2003. The band re-emerged in 2005 with a new bassist, Tana Haugo, and new drummer, Antonio Ishikawa and released their 2005 album, Searching Low & High, on Diwphalanx Records. They also appeared on the live DVD Wizard's Convention: Japanese Heavy Rock Showcase alongside fellow Japanese bands Boris, Church of Misery and Greenmachine. In 2007 the band released a split CDEP with Black Cobra. In 2009 they released the album Within the Triad. After 7 years since album Within the Triad the band released new album Resonance of Shadows on Cornucopia Records label.

== Members ==
- Yukito Okazaki – vocals and guitar
  - He has worked as an engineer with the bands such as Laputa, Sigh, Nepenthes and Deadclaw.
- Tana Haugo – bass

== Discography ==
=== Albums ===
- Faithful CD (1996 Cornucopia Records)
- Spiritualized D CD/LP (2000 MeteorCity)
- Share CD (2002 MeteorCity)
- Searching Low & High (2005 Diwphalanx Records)
- Within the Triad (2009 Diwphalanx Records)
- Resonance of Shadows (2016 Cornucopia Records)

=== Singles/EPs ===
- split with Of the Spacistor (2003 Cornucopia Records)
- split CD with Black Cobra (2007 Diwphalanx Records)
- Eternal Elysium EP (Features material from the Black Cobra split & a jam) (2008)

=== Live ===
- Wizard's Convention: Japanese Heavy Rock Showcase DVD (2005 Diwphalanx Records)

=== Compilation tracks ===
- "Easygoin'" on At the Mountains of Madness (1998 Miskatonic Foundation)
- "Easygoin'," "Zen" & "Splendid, Selfish Woman" on Doomsday Recitation (1998 Cornucopia Records)
- "Behind" on Survive List (1998 Survive Records)
- "What A Difference A Day Makes" on Survive List 2 (2000 Survive Records)
- "Innocent Exile" (Iron Maiden cover) on Slave to the Power (2000 MeteorCity Records)
- "Seduction" (Black Widow cover) on King of the Witches (2001 Black Widow Records)
- "Burning a Sinner" (Witchfinder General cover) on I Am Vengeance (2001 MeteorCity Records)
- "Godzilla" (Blue Öyster Cult cover) on Not of This Earth (2004 Black Widow Records)
- "White Witch" (Angel Witch cover) on Earthquake A.G.M. (2005 Sub-Effect Records)
- "Agent of Doom" and a short sample of another song appears on a 2008 Japanese compilation.
