= Heavy Rocks =

Heavy Rocks may refer to:

- Heavy Rocks (2002 album), by Japanese band Boris
- Heavy Rocks (2011 album), by Japanese band Boris
- Heavy Rocks (2022 album), by Japanese band Boris

== See also ==
- Heavy rock (disambiguation)
