= Absolutego =

Studio album / single by Boris
- Released: 1996-09-?? (original); 2001-02-20 (reissue); 2010-06-02 (reissue); 2020-11-11 (reissue)
- Recorded: 1996–07 (original); 2001 (reissue)
- Genre: Drone-doom
- Length: 60:15 (1996 original); 73:24 (2001 reissue); 68:14 (2020 reissue)
- Label: Fangs Anal Satan; Southern Lord (SUNN10); Third Man Records (TMR686)
- Producer: Boris

Boris chronology
Boris/Barebones (1996)	Absolutego (1996)	Amplifier Worship (1998)

Alternative cover
- 2001 re-release

Professional ratings
Review scores
Source	Rating
AllMusic	4.5/5 stars

Absolutego is the debut studio single (often described as an album) by Japanese experimental band Boris. It was released in 1996 by Fangs Anal Satan. This early release shows inspiration from the Melvins and, most prominently, Earth. This marked the first release following the departure of original drummer Nagata, and Boris performing as a three-piece.

There has been a mistaken idea over the years by fans and those describing this release in print that it constitutes an album by definition simply due to its song length. However, the band has stated consistently over many years that their intention was to release Absolutego as a "single" - even though the original idea of a single hour-long song in this format was unheard of at the time.

Takeshi: "Absolutego was the first single, Amplifier Worship was the first album — both are works that were our starting points. Listening now, there are parts that sound childish and rough, but I want to share the musical experiences that we gained and experienced with the listeners, without hiding any parts. I feel that it's also important to present the series of sound quests that the band experienced."

A different song with the same title also appears in the album Dear and re-appears on the "collaboration album" 2R0I2P0.

In 2001 Southern Lord Records remixed and re-released the album on CD. The remixing process by Southern Lord entailed slowing down the track, extending the track-length an additional 5:11. This new mix made the lower frequencies more prominent and was relabeled as Absolutego+ (Special Low Frequency Version) in homage to Earth 2. Stephen O'Malley redesigned the artwork for the release, continuing the themes of the original but designing a Medusa-styled Wata playing guitar as the feature of the cover art.

A bonus track was also included on the reissue, which was originally recorded in 1997; its title Dronevil would be one used for multiple songs and releases (a trend which continued with three albums titled Heavy Rocks, one in 2002, another in 2011, and a third in 2022). The song "Dronevil", originally a Heavy Rocks (2002) outtake, was first released on the Mangrove 2002 compilation and later included in the 2023 reissue of Heavy Rocks (2002).

Southern Lord released the 2001 remaster on vinyl in 2010 with updated artwork, splitting the title track arbitrarily with cutoffs to fill the first three sides; the fourth side contains the final 9:35 and bonus track "Dronevil 2".

In November 2020, Boris released (through Fangs Anal Satan in Japan and Third Man Records worldwide) a reissue of the original 1996 studio recordings. This time the remastering process was personally directed by the band and the track was returned to its 1996 track length. The original artwork was also used for this reissue and updated only to fit current CD and vinyl formats. The track "Dronevil 2" (which was used for the Southern Lord reissue) was also included in this version, bringing together the bands preferred make up of all previous versions.

== Track listing ==
Absolutego
No.	Title	Length
1.	"Absolutego"	60:15
Total length:		60:15

Absolutego+
No.	Title	Length
1.	"Absolutego"	65:34
2.	"Dronevil 2"	7:50
Total length:		73:24

Absolutego (2020 Reissue)
No.	Title	Length
1.	"Absolutego"	60:23
2.	"Dronevil 2"	7:51
Total length:		68:14

== Personnel ==
On Absolutego's original release release, Takeshi is credited as "Ohtani". This was corrected for the later reissues of the album.

- Atsuo – vocals, drums
- Takeshi – bass
- Wata – guitars
- Kakinuma – engineer
- Boris – production
- Just Play Design Uechi – artwork and typography

== Pressing history ==
Year	Label	Format	Country	Out of Print?	Notes
1996	Fangs Anal Satan	CD	Japan	Yes	Original release in CD Jewel Case
2001	Southern Lord	CD-R	U.S.	Yes	Includes new artwork by Stephen O'Malley; bonus track included.
2001	Southern Lord	CD	U.S.	Yes	First print run in orange Jewel Case, second printing in clear Jewel Case; new artwork by Stephen O'Malley; bonus track included.
2010	Southern Lord	Vinyl	U.S.	Yes	Double LP reissue; 2000 Black vinyl copies; 1000 red vinyl copies; artwork updated by Stephen O'Malley from the 2001 reissue; Includes bonus track
2020	Third Man	Vinyl	U.S.	No	Original 1996 artwork; reissued by Third Man Records worldwide; limited edition blood vinyl variant; opaque red vinyl variant; standard black variant; total reissue copies unknown; includes bonus track
2020	Fangs Anal Satan	CD	Japan	No	Original 1996 artwork; reissued for Japan only release; 1000 copies total; includes bonus track
