= Inoxia Records =

Japanese record label

Inoxia
- Founded: 1996
- Genre: Experimental, experimental rock, doom metal, psychedelic
- Country of origin: Japan
- Official website: www.inoxia-rec.com

Inoxia Records is a Japanese record label closely related to the experimental music band Boris. In addition to releasing, Inoxia also distributes other Japanese labels such as Daymare Recordings, Pedal Records, and Diwphalanx Records.

The label was established in Tokyo in 1996.

== Discography ==
- Various artists - From Koenji to Eternity CD (1997)
- Soft - Shamanic Waveform CD (1997)
- Keiji Haino with Boris - Black: Implication Flooding CD (1998)
- Thermo - drum plugged CD (1999)
- Boris vs. Choukoku no Niwa - More Echoes, Touching Air Landscape CD (1999)
- Thermo - Touring Inferno CD (2001)
- Boris with Merzbow - Megatone CD (2002)
- Boris - 1970 7" (2002)
- Gaji - 9pm at GFM CD (2003)
- Niwa - I & I Harmonic Odyssey CD (2003)
- Boris with Merzbow - 04092001 LP (2005)
- Boris - Soundtrack from the Film Mabuta no Ura LP (2005)
- Boris - Dronevil - final 2xCD (2006)
- Sunn O & Boris - Altar CD (Japanese version) (2006)
- Rollo - Pinhole LP (2007)
- Boris with Michio Kurihara - Rainbow LP/2-LP box set (2007)

== See also ==
- List of record labels
