= Gensho (album) =

Studio album by Boris with Merzbow
- Released: March 16, 2016
- Recorded: 2016
- Studios: Sound Square (Boris); Munemihouse (Merzbow)
- Genres: Noise; drone; psychedelic; doom metal; shoegaze
- Length: 148:51
- Label: Relapse

Boris with Merzbow chronology
Klatter (2011)	Gensho (2016)	2R0I2P0 (2020)

Boris chronology
Asia (2015)	Gensho (2016)	Dear (2017)

Merzbow chronology
Konchuuki (2015)	Gensho (2016)	Kakapo (2016)

Gensho (現象; "phenomenon") is the fourth collaborative studio album and seventh release by the Japanese experimental band Boris and noise musician Merzbow. It is presented in two parts; the first disc features re-recordings of several Boris songs and a cover of the My Bloody Valentine song "Sometimes" in drone-based, drumless style, while the second disc consists of new compositions by Merzbow. They are intended to be played at the same time, much like the previous Boris double album Dronevil, or as separate works.

Initial teasers were posted at the start of the year, most prominently a live clip of "Huge" from the Fever performance on January 21. Rolling Stone announced YouTube streams of "Heavy Rain", and its accompanying section of "Goloka pt. 2" on February 5, 2016. Later in February, The Wire debuted a live video of Boris alone playing the song "More" from Leave Them All Behind 2015.

== Background ==
The album was inspired by their June 2014 Boiler Room set, during which Boris played a drumless set, followed by Merzbow, and then a joint set by Boris with Merzbow. In support of Gensho, they played a one-off show at Fever in Tokyo on November 27, 2015; a recording of the concert called Gensho at Fever 11272015 is included as a bonus with the Japanese release of Gensho by Daymare Recordings. It includes the recorded debut of a new Boris song "More", as well as a performance of rare song "Kilmister," created for the web anime series Ninja Slayer, and a cover of the Man song "Many Are Called, but Few Get Up". Because the Boris tracks are primarily drone-based, both presented versions of the song "Akuma no Uta" are actually more similar to "Introduction" from the same album; regardless, the song is credited as "Akuma no Uta" on all versions.

The vinyl version of the album is released as two separate double LPs; one LP with half of the Boris material and one LP with half of the Merzbow material. Thus, no matter which form is purchased, it is possible to play both contributors simultaneously. These are also available bundled together as a single deluxe edition. The deluxe LP was featured as Record of the Week by Pirates Press.

== Critical reception ==
Professional ratings
Review scores
Source	Rating
AllMusic	4/5 stars

AllMusic critic Thom Jurek wrote: "When taken together, these records offer ever-varying degrees of light, dark, power, and emotion that wash over the listener. Creatively, Gensho is so rich and expansive, fans of both acts should find it indispensable."

== Track listing ==
=== Gensho ===
Disc 1 – Boris
No.	Title	Length
1.	"Farewell" (originally from Pink)	7:53
2.	"Huge" (originally from Amplifier Worship)	10:50
3.	"Resonance"	4:03
4.	"Rainbow" (originally from Rainbow)	6:20
5.	"Sometimes" (My Bloody Valentine cover)	9:45
6.	"Heavy Rain" (originally from Noise)	7:50
7.	"Akuma no Uta" (originally from Akuma no Uta)	11:43
8.	"Akirame Flower" (originally from Golden Dance Classics split)	6:14
9.	"Vomitself" (originally from Amplifier Worship)	9:47
Total length:		74:25

Disc 2 – Merzbow
No.	Title	Length
1.	"Planet of the Cows"	18:43
2.	"Goloka Pt. 1"	20:09
3.	"Goloka Pt. 2"	19:33
4.	"Prelude to a Broken Arm"	16:01
Total length:		74:26

=== Gensho Expanded Edition ===
Disc 3 – Live at Fever Pt.1
No.	Title	Length
1.	"Overture"	2:46
2.	"決別" (Farewell)	8:10
3.	"Huge"	10:23
4.	"虹がはじまるとき" (Rainbow)	6:01
5.	"Resonance"	1:02
6.	"More"	6:46
7.	"キルミスター incl. "Many Are Called, but Few Get Up"" ("Kilmister")	12:10
8.	"黒猫メロディ" ("Melody"; originally from Noise)	7:23
Total length:		54:41

Disc 4 – Live at Fever Pt.2
No.	Title	Length
1.	"Angel" (originally from Noise)	18:17
2.	"あくまのうた" ("Akuma no Uta")	14:57
3.	"雨" ("Heavy Rain")	7:09
4.	"Vomitself"	14:05
Total length:		54:28

== Personnel ==
All personnel credits adapted from the album notes.

=== Boris ===
- Takeshi – vocals, guitar, bass
- Wata – vocals, guitar, echo
- Atsuo – vocals, percussion, electronics

=== Merzbow ===
- Masami Akita – electronics

=== Technical personnel ===
- Shinobu Narita – sound production (Boris)
- Fangsanalsatan – recording (Boris), artwork
- Soichiro Nakamur – mixing (Boris), mastering
- Tadashi Hamada – A&R

== Release history ==
Region	Date	Label	Format	Catalog	Quantity	Notes
Japan	March 16, 2016	Daymare	4×CD	DYMC-260		expanded edition
United States	March 18, 2016	Relapse	2×CD	RR7321		
United States	March 18, 2016	Relapse	4×LP	RR7321 / RR7326	500	Parts 1 & 2
United States	March 18, 2016	Relapse	2×LP	RR7321	1000	Part 1
United States	March 18, 2016	Relapse	2×LP	RR7326	1000	Part 2
