= 04092001 =

Live album by Boris and Merzbow
- Released: February 11, 2005
- Recorded: September 4, 2001 at Milk, Tokyo
- Genre: Dark ambient
- Length: 31:00
- Label: Inoxia
- Producer: Boris with Merzbow

Boris and Merzbow chronology
Megatone (2002)	04092001 (2005)	Sun Baked Snow Cave (2005)

Boris chronology
The Thing Which Solomon Overlooked (2004)	04092001 (2005)	Sun Baked Snow Cave (2005)

Merzbow chronology
Bariken (2005)	04092001 (2005)	Dust of Dreams (2005)

04092001 is a collaborative live album between Japanese experimental metal band Boris and noise musician Merzbow, recorded live on September 4, 2001, but not released until February 11, 2005. Although no track listing is provided on the cover, the album clearly consists of five songs that later appeared on Boris' 2002 album Heavy Rocks.

== Track listing ==
Side one
No.	Title	Length
1.	Untitled ("Heavy Friends", "WaReRuRide", "Koei")	15:36

Side two
No.	Title	Length
1.	Untitled ("Death Valley", "Dyna-Soar")	15:24
Total length:		31:00

== Personnel ==
Boris with Merzbow

- Masami Akita – computer
- Takeshi – vocal, bass
- Wata – guitar
- Atsuo – vocal, drums

Production

- Souichiro Nakamura – mastering at Peace Music, 08052003
- Enju Tanahashi – executive producer
- Fangsanalsatan – design

== Release history ==
Region	Date	Label	Format	Quantity	Catalog
Japan	February 11, 2005	Inoxia	LP	500	IXLP-0005
