= The Black Cobra =

The Black Cobra can refer to:

- Black Cobra (film series), an Italian film series
- The Black Cobra (1963 film), a 1963 Austrian film
- Black Cobra (band), a doom band
