= Fade (Boris album) =

Studio album by Boris
- Released: 2 December 2022
- Recorded: 2022
- Genre: Drone metal, experimental rock, doom metal
- Length: 64:14
- Label: Fangs Anal Satan
- Producer: Boris

Boris chronology
| Heavy Rocks (2022) | Fade (2022) |

Fade is the twenty-eighth studio album by Japanese experimental band Boris, released on 2 December 2022 under the band's label Fangs Anal Satan. It is their third studio album to be released in 2022, and it appeared with no prior announcement. Unlike some of the band's other recent releases, Fade explores drone metal sounds and is mostly instrumental. "prologue sansaro" was the first song from the album to be promoted with a music video.

According to the band, Fade is "not bound by concepts of rock and music in general, but could rather be said to be a documentary of the world plunged into the chaotic age of boris [sic] moving forward."

== Critical reception ==
Upon its release, the album received generally positive reviews. According to Stereogum, "If you're in the mood for a staring-into-infinity trance, then this might be the Boris album for you." Fader called the album "seething guitar noise, the perfect soundtrack to your imminent holiday existential crisis." According to Metal Injection, "If you're into the swirling drones that Boris does oh-so-well, then you're really going to like Fade." In a staff review for Sputnik Music, Raul Stanciu compared Fade to the band's other drone-oriented albums of the past, such as Amplifier Worship and Dronevil, noting that the new album "might become exhausting at some point, especially for those not accustomed to Boris' forays into this kind of music", but concluding that "Having mastered the technique over the years, they [Boris] smoothly create a thick sonic bubble for you to immerse yourself into."

== Track listing ==
| No. | Title | Length |
|---|---|---|
| 1. | "prologue sansaro" | 15:19 |
| 2. | "chapter 1 gekkou no irie -howling moon, melting sun" | 14:21 |
| 3. | "chapter 2 michikusa" | 3:52 |
| 4. | "chapter 3 (nanji, sashidasareta te wo tsukamu bekarazu)" | 9:36 |
| 5. | "chapter 4 marine snow" | 6:30 |
| 6. | "epilogue a bao a qu - infinite corridor" | 14:36 |
| Total length: | | 64:14 |

== Personnel ==
- Takeshi – bass, guitar, vocals
- Wata – guitar, music box, echo, vocals
- Atsuo – drums, electronics, vocals
