= Flood (Boris album) =

Studio album by Boris
- Released: December 15, 2000
- Recorded: September, 2000 at Bazooka Studio
- Genre: Post-rock; doom metal; drone
- Length: 70:32
- Label: MIDI Creative
- Producer: Boris

Boris chronology
| More Echoes, Touching Air Landscape (1999) | Flood (2000) | Megatone (2002) |

Flood is the second studio album by Japanese experimental band Boris, released on December 15, 2000. It consists of a single 70-minute title-track that is broken into four movements.

While Flood did not receive many reviews upon release, it has become a cult classic among fans, prompting the band to play it in its entirety every night of their 2013 US-based "Residency Tour".

On December 15, 2025, Flood was added on streaming services such as Spotify, Apple Music and Amazon Music for the 25th anniversary of its release.

== Musical style ==
The album marked a change in musical direction; it features less of the abrasive sound heard on Absolutego and Amplifier Worship, and incorporates minimalism and post-rock elements.

== Movements ==
Part I begins with mechanical white noise and features a single looping guitar riff duplicated with two slightly different speeds, allowing it to de-synchronize and synchronize again over the course of about 11 minutes. Reverberating explosions build throughout.

Part II is slow and ambient with lo-fi drums and features an extended guitar solo using the riff from Part I as a motif.

Part III builds to the album's climax of repeating riffs, vocals and another guitar solo.

Part IV is an ambient minimalist track ending in white noise.

== Track listing ==
| No. | Title | Length |
|---|---|---|
| 1. | "Flood"; I. "Part I"; II. "Part II"; III. "Part III"; IV. "Part IV" | 70:32; 14:42; 13:34; 20:38; 21:35 |
| Total length: | | 70:32 |

== Credits ==
=== Line-up ===
- Atsuo – drums, percussion, gong, vocals
- Takeshi – vocals, bass, guitar, words
- Wata – guitar, effects

=== Additional personnel ===
- Boris – producer
- Hiroshi Okura – executive producer
- Tetsuya "Cherry" Tochigi – engineer
- Hiroyasu Tahira – engineer assistant
- Miyuki Kobayashi – engineer assistant
- Masashi Tsukahara – album coordination
- Toshiaki Shimizu – A&R
- Fangs Anal Satan – artwork
- Eri Shabata – photography
- Shuji Kitamura – mastering

== Pressing information ==
| Year | Label | Format | Country | Out of Print? | Notes |
|---|---|---|---|---|---|
| 2000 | MIDI Creative | CD | Japan | Yes | – |
| 2021 | Third Man | 2xLP | United States | No | First vinyl pressing |
