= 2R0I2P0 =

Studio album by Boris with Merzbow
- Released: December 11, 2020
- Recorded: 2019–2020
- Genre: Doom metal, noise rock
- Length: 77:53
- Label: Relapse

Boris with Merzbow chronology
| Gensho (2016) | 2R0I2P0 (2020) |

Boris chronology
| NO (2020) | 2R0I2P0 (2020) | W (2022) |

Merzbow chronology
| Screaming Dove (2020) | 2R0I2P0 (2020) | Electronic Union (2020) |

2R0I2P0 is the eighth collaborative release by the Japanese experimental band Boris and noise musician Merzbow. It features several rerecorded tracks that first appeared on Boris' album Love & Evol, and a cover of the Melvins song "Boris", which the band is named after. It was released in December 2020.

A video was released for the track "Away from You" on October 19, 2020.

== Background ==
The title stands for "2020 rest in peace", with Boris noting that "This year was a period of trial for everyone in the world". At the time of 2R0I2P0's release, the last time Boris performed before an audience was with Merzbow in Melbourne, Australia on February 29, 2020. The recording was finished in mid-March and submitted to the label in May. The album was completed before No.

== Track listing ==
| No. | Title | Length |
|---|---|---|
| 1. | "Away from You" (Originally from Love & Evol) | 7:35 |
| 2. | "To the Beach" (Coaltar of the Deepers cover) | 7:10 |
| 3. | "Coma" (Originally from Love & Evol) | 3:14 |
| 4. | "Love" (Originally from Love & Evol) | 6:43 |
| 5. | "Absolutego" (Originally from Dear) | 4:31 |
| 6. | "Journey" (Originally from Unknown Flowers) | 7:45 |
| 7. | "Uzume" (Originally from Love & Evol) | 6:51 |
| 8. | "Evol" (Originally from Love & Evol) | 13:05 |
| 9. | "Boris" (Melvins cover) | 8:50 |
| 10. | "Shadow of Skull" (Originally from Love & Evol) | 12:09 |

== Personnel ==
All personnel credits adapted from the album notes.

=== Boris ===
- Takeshi – vocals, guitar, bass
- Wata – vocals, guitar, echo
- Atsuo – vocals, percussion, electronics

=== Merzbow ===
- Masami Akita – computer, percussion, noise electronics

=== Technical personnel ===
- Amak Golden – Boris tracks recording
- Fangsanalsatan – Boris tracks recording, total mix, design
- Soichiro Nakamura – basic mix, mastering
