= Black Cobra (band) =

American heavy metal band

- Jason Landrian

Background information
- Origin: San Francisco, California
- Genres: Sludge metal; doom metal; heavy metal
- Years active: 2001–present
- Labels: Season of Mist; Southern Lord; At a Loss Recordings
- Members: Jason Landrian; Rafael Martinez
- Website: www.blackcobra.net

Black Cobra is an American heavy metal duo from San Francisco. The band was formed in 2001 by former Cavity guitarist Jason Landrian and Acid King bassist Rafael Martinez. Their first release, a self-titled and self-released EP containing the tracks "Interceptor", "Fall and Fall Again", and "Silverback", was engineered by Martinez and issued on August 27, 2004.

== Members ==
- Jason Landrian – guitars, vocals
- Rafael "Rafa" Martinez – drums

== Discography ==
Studio albums

- Bestial (2006, At a Loss)
- Feather and Stone (2007, At a Loss)
- Chronomega (2009, Southern Lord)
- Invernal (2011, Southern Lord)
- Imperium Simulacra (2016, Season of Mist)

Split albums

- split with Eternal Elysium (2007, Diwphalanx)

Extended plays

- Black Cobra (2004, self-released)

Compilation appearances

- "Frozen Night" on Metal Swim (2010)
