= Pink (Boris album) =

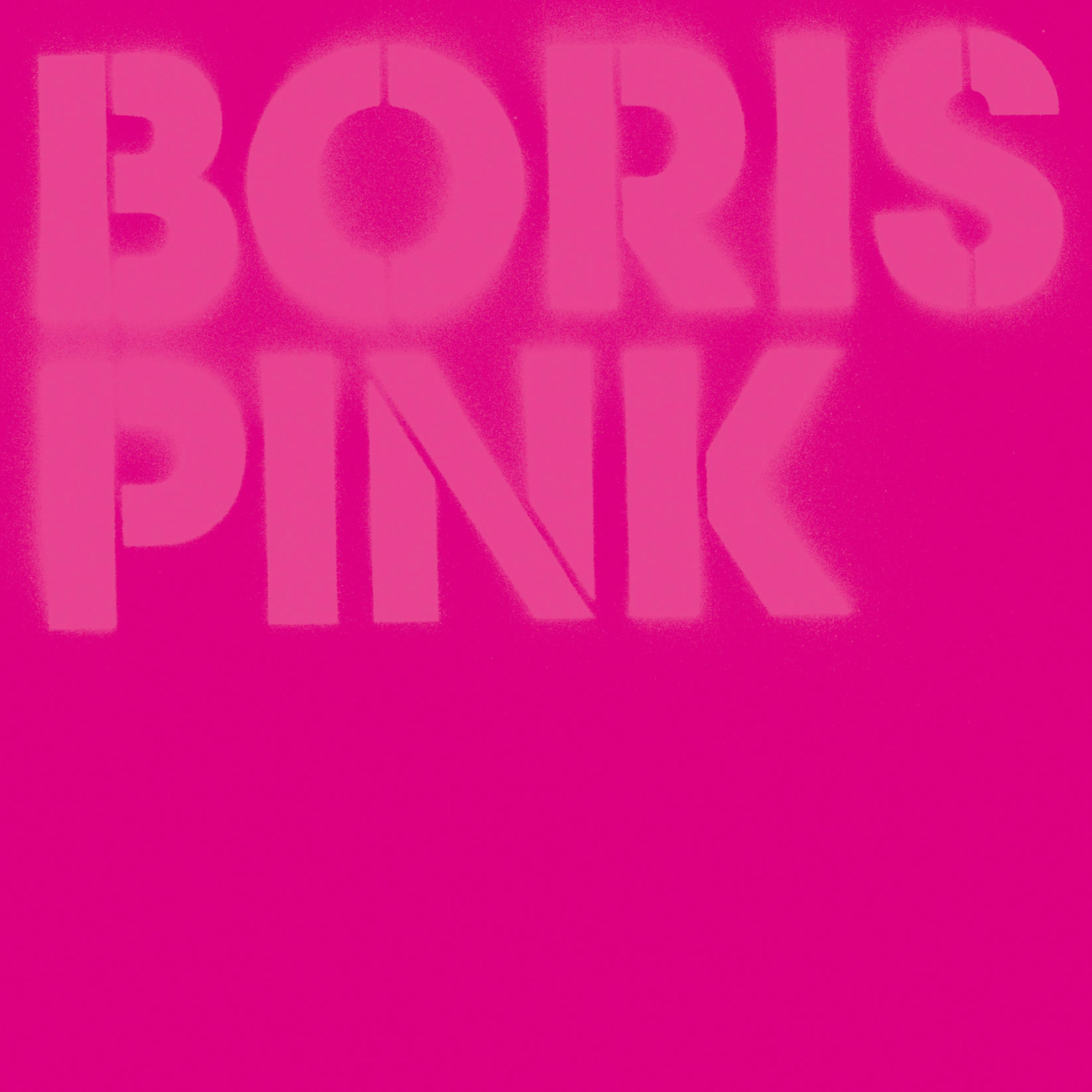

Studio album by Boris
- Released: November 18, 2005
- Recorded: 2005
- Studio: Sound Square
- Genres: Metal; stoner metal; noise rock; garage punk; ambient; psychedelia
- Length: 47:23 (CD version); 55:23 (CD reissue); 72:16 (LP version); 93:58 (2016 deluxe CD version); 110:51 (2016 deluxe LP version)
- Label: Diwphalanx
- Producer: Boris

Boris chronology
Boris Archive (2005)	Pink (2005)	The Thing Which Solomon Overlooked 2 (2006)

Alternative cover
- 2006 Southern Lord release

Pink is the ninth studio album by Japanese experimental music band Boris. It was originally released in 2005 through Diwphalanx Records in Japan and subsequently reissued in 2006 by American label Southern Lord Records.

The album's length was extended significantly on the LP version of the album. For the 2006 reissue of Pink, the album's cover art, track order, and length were modified from the original version released in Japan in 2005. Additionally, a music video was shot for the title track which was limited to 100 copies on DVD. Since then, the music video has been included in the limited edition of the album Smile, also published by Southern Lord.

An expanded reissue of the album using the original Japanese filled stencil-style art was announced for worldwide release by Sargent House on May 9, 2016, simultaneously debuting new track "Are You Ready" from its bonus disc. Later the same month, NPR Music hosted a stream of an additional new song from the release, "SOFUN". Sargent House streamed the bonus disc via their SoundCloud page the day before it was released on July 8, 2016. The full-length version of the track "Farewell" from the LP edition appears on Boris / Variations + Live in Japan. It was also re-recorded for Boris' collaborative studio album with Merzbow, Gensho.

Pink has been met with critical acclaim, particularly for incorporating more melody into the band's abrasive sound. It is regarded as Boris' breakthrough, and several music sites have listed it as one of the best albums, metal or otherwise, of the 2000s.

== Composition ==
Pink has large musical footing in metal, with doom, sludge, stoner, and thrash styles all seen throughout. However, true to Boris' eclectic nature, it also shows roots in ambient, hardcore, garage punk, garage rock, noise prog, dream pop, post-metal, and post-rock. Their "pensive", "poised" handling of shoegaze is seen as the record's strength. Loudwire saw a slight acid rock sound brought on by its "organic" lo-fi production.

== Reception ==
Professional ratings
Original 2005/2006 releases
Aggregate scores
Source	Rating
Metacritic	80/100
Review scores
Source	Rating
AllMusic	5/5 stars
Cokemachineglow	79%
Drowned in Sound	8/10
Exclaim!	(favorable)
Neumu	8/10
Now	4/5
Pitchfork	8.7/10
Spin	A
Stylus Magazine	C
Tiny Mix Tapes	2/5 marks

Pink's original releases were greeted with generally positive reviews. At Metacritic, which assigns a normalized rating out of 100 to reviews from mainstream critics, the album has received an average score of 80, based on 13 reviews.

Awarding it a full five stars, AllMusic's Thom Jurek named it Boris' "most cohesive, adventurous, and "listenable" recording" to date. Pitchfork's Brandon Stosuy called it their "most melodic, conventionally structured, and aggressively addictive LP to date." He named them "2006's balls-out riff makers to beat." Giving it his site's fullest rating, Spin's Joe Gross called it "crazy [and] gorgeous", praising the band's ability to "flatten a club with their firepower." Neumu's Tom Ridge positively noted its appeal to both extreme metal and avant-rock fans while keeping an accessibility for curious listeners.

However, some critics were more reserved. Stylus' Stewart Voegtlin criticized the band's "infatuation with kitschy artistic jest" which "does little to empower their sound". Leaving the album "unimpressed", he dubbed it "neither a step in a [nearly] "right" direction nor a meaningful action altogether." Tiny Mix Tapes' Grant 'Gumshoe' Purdum dismissed it as "quite simply half-there." He labeled it "muddy as a bowl of bad split pea soup, and twice as hammy."

== Impact and legacy ==
Professional ratings
2016 deluxe reissue
Review scores
Source	Rating
Consequence	A−
The Line of Best Fit	9/10
Record Collector	4/5 stars
The Spill Magazine	4/5 stars
Uncut	8/10

Pink's 2016 reissue was met with acclaim. Applauding it as "groundbreaking", Consequence's Nina Corcoran claimed the album "holds up with contagious energy and genuinely mesmerizing atmosphere". The Line of Best Fit's Geoff Cowart felt the reissue spoke to how "fresh and amusingly prophetic" Pink remained.

=== Impact and legacy ===
"A masterpiece of modern metal", Pink is seen as a breakthrough for Boris, its musical diversity and accessibility both factoring into its applause. Treble called it "their most eclectic and most accessible" songs. Loudwire ranked it as one of stoner rock / metal's 11 best albums. Tiny Mix Tapes dubbed it "one of the most rewarding and exciting metal records" of the 2000s.

Nashville Scene distinguished it as "the album that made metal hip", helping heavy music reach more indie-inclined listeners outside of underground metal. This aspect helped future bands like Baroness, Pallbearer, and more find crossover success. Invisible Oranges credited it with instilling appreciation for "minimalistic yet heavy" sounds in metal fans. They dubbed Boris one of the first bands to fuse ambient, shoegaze, and sludge elements. To "lure in newcomers", melodic rock and shoegaze elements appear. Nina Corcoran of Consequence likened this aspect to a similarly stylized album, then-trio Deafheaven's Sunbather (2013). Like that record, Pink's accessibility has helped it be noted as one of few albums that "extend[s] with sincerity" to normally non-metal listeners. Bandcamp Daily recognized both the album and Boris' place in post-metal's history. Alongside 2005's Dronevil, Pink was given credit for speaking to their consistent embrace of the scene's spirit and vitality. Treble felt that Pink announced Boris as "the definitive post-metal band", if only due to their disloyalty to genre.

Several tracks have gone on to become fan favourites and critical hits, particularly "Farewell". Invisible Oranges' staff deemed the track "one of those rare convergences between a band's best-known song and its strongest." They even felt it "[eclipse] pretty much anything else in Boris' discography." Treble placed it among the essential songs in the shoegaze genre's history. In a similar list by BrooklynVegan, "Farewell" ranked as an essential track of the 2000s/'10s shoegaze and heavy music crossover. It would later be included on the soundtrack of Jim Jarmusch's 2009 film The Limits of Control, which Boris also scored. Treble wrote that "Your Name Part 2"'s "slow-burn charm" foresaw Baroness in the era of their album Yellow & Green (2012).

To commemorate its 10th anniversary, Boris embarked on a North American and European tour of the album. The tour involved 28 performances in various U.S. cities and two in Canada's Montreal and Toronto. Drone metal trio Earth accompanied the band for all U.S. dates, but sat out for Canada's two dates. The last two months of 2016 were devoted to 28 performances across Europe and the U.K.

=== Accolades ===
Clayton Purdom for Cokemachineglow named Pink "the best heavy metal record" of the 2000s, defending it against some of the band's fans' arguments. He deemed it "a language-and-rhetoric free artistic statement" that "shattered", "steamrolled", and "de-verb[ed]" any arguments.

Publication	Country	List	Rank	Ref.
Blender	US	The 50 Greatest CDs of 2006	49	
Cokemachineglow	Canada	Top 100 Albums of the 2000s	69	
Pitchfork	US	Top 50 Albums of 2006	9	
PopMatters	US	The Best Metal Albums of 2006	2	
Tiny Mix Tapes	US	Favorite Albums of 2006	22	
Tiny Mix Tapes	US	Favorite 100 Albums of 2000–2009	65	
Treble	US	The Best Metal Albums of the 21st Century	20	
Treble	US	The Best Albums of the '00s	101	

== Track listing ==
No.	Title	Length
1.	"決別" ("Farewell")	7:33
2.	"Pink"	4:20
3.	"スクリーンの女" ("Woman on the Screen")	2:38
4.	"別になんでもない" ("Nothing Special")	2:17
5.	"ブラックアウト" ("Blackout")	4:49
6.	"Electric"	1:45
7.	"偽ブレッド" ("Pseudo-Bread")	4:29
8.	"ぬるい炎" ("Afterburner")	4:22
9.	"6を3つ" ("Six, Three Times")	2:53
10.	"My Machine"	2:01
11.	"俺を捨てたところ" ("Just Abandoned Myself"; 18:14 on English version)	10:14
Total length:		47:23

=== Southern Lord CD version ===
No.	Title	Length
1.	"Farewell" (決別)	7:33
2.	"Pink"	4:20
3.	"Woman on the Screen" (スクリーンの女)	2:38
4.	"Nothing Special" (別になんでもない)	2:17
5.	"Blackout" (ブラックアウト)	4:49
6.	"Electric"	1:45
7.	"Pseudo-Bread" (偽ブレッド)	4:29
8.	"Afterburner" (ぬるい炎)	4:22
9.	"Six, Three Times" (6を3つ)	2:53
10.	"My Machine"	2:01
11.	"Just Abandoned Myself" (俺を捨てたところ; 10:14 on Japanese version)	18:14
Total length:		55:23

=== LP version ===
Side A
No.	Title	Length
1.	"Pink"	4:20
2.	"Woman on the Screen"	2:38
3.	"Nothing Special"	2:17
4.	"Blackout"	4:49

Side B
No.	Title	Length
1.	"Electric"	1:45
2.	"Six, Three Times"	2:53
3.	"Afterburner"	4:22
4.	"Pseudo-Bread"	10:08

Side C
No.	Title	Length
1.	"My Machine"	11:14
2.	"Farewell"	9:32

Side D
No.	Title	Length
1.	"Just Abandoned My-Self"	18:14
Total length:		72:16

=== 2016 deluxe version ===
The first disc of the CD release is identical to the Southern Lord CD release, and the first two discs of the LP release are identical to those of the previous LP release.

Forbidden Songs
No.	Title	Length
1.	"Your Name Part 2"	6:15
2.	"Heavy Rock Industry"	3:18
3.	"SOFUN"	3:57
4.	"non/sha/lant"	2:35
5.	"Room Noise"	3:35
6.	"Talisman"	4:26
7.	"N.F. Sorrow"	7:50
8.	"Are You Ready?"	4:21
9.	"Tiptoe"	2:18
Total length:		38:35

The LP version of this disc splits the track list between "Room Noise" and "Talisman".

== Personnel ==
Sourced from AllMusic's credits.

Boris

- Takeshi – vocals, bass, guitar
- Wata – guitar, echo, sound effects
- Atsuo – drums, percussion

Technical

- Boris – production
- Souichirou Nakamura – mixing, mastering

Artwork & design

- Fangs Anal Satan – artwork
- Stephen O'Malley – design (LP version)
- The Lord – A&R (reissue)
- Blake & Durer – artwork (reissue)
- P.C.B. – design (reissue)

== Pressing history ==
Year	Label	Format	Country	Out of print?	Notes
2005	Diwphalanx	CD	Japan	No	Some copies featured a die-cut sleeve around the jewel box
2005	Diwphalanx	2xLP	Japan	Yes	Ltd. 500. Deluxe 2xLP featuring a die-cut "stencil" cover and extended cuts of "Pseudo-Bread", "My Machine", "Farewell" and "Just Abandoned Myself"; different track listing
2006	Southern Lord	CD	United States	Yes	Different cover from Japanese pressing; has same audio overall as the Japanese CD apart from featuring the same extended cut of "Just Abandoned Myself" as the Japanese 2xLP. The cover art features pictures by the poet and artist William Blake depicting Satan from his illustrations to John Milton's Paradise Lost. The album also comes with three paintings of devil imagery on sheets of what resembles perforated "blotter paper," usually associated with LSD. Also, the misspelling of 'abandoned' to 'abondoned' on the album sleeve and online MP3 tagging seems to be intended.
2006	Southern Lord	2xLP	United States	Yes	Ltd. 6000. Pressed on 180g pink marble (2000), clear pink (2000) and black vinyl (2000); has same audio overall as the Japanese 2xLP; same cover art as the US CD
2007	Southern Lord	2xLP	United States	Yes	Ltd. 2000. Pressed on 180g icy pink (1000) and deep red (1000); has same audio overall as the Japanese 2xLP; same cover art as the US CD
