= Noise (Boris album) =

Studio album by Boris
- Released: 18 June 2014
- Recorded: 2013
- Studio: Sound Square
- Genre: Post-metal; shoegaze
- Length: 57:57
- Label: Tearbridge, Sargent House, Daymare
- Producer: Boris

Boris chronology
Präparat (2013)	Noise (2014)	The Thing Which Solomon Overlooked Extra (2014)

Alternative cover
- Sargent House, 2014

Noise is the eighteenth studio album by Japanese rock band Boris. The Japanese edition of the album was released on 18 June 2014 via Avex Group's sub-label Tearbridge Records and consists of the original album plus other songs previously released on other endeavors, such as "Kimi no Yukue" which was used for a promotional video for the Chunsoft video game Zero Escape: Virtue's Last Reward in Japan. This is the second Boris album released through a major label (the first one being 2011's New Album, also released by Avex Group/Tearbridge). It was released on 17 June 2014 through Sargent House record label internationally on both CD and double vinyl. A Japanese double vinyl edition was released by Daymare Recordings (without the bonus tracks on the Avex version).

The release date and the covers of the album were announced on April 8, 2014. Along with the announcement, an edit of the track "Quicksilver" was also released for streaming. The band embarked on a North American tour in 2014 in support of the album.

A studio re-recording of "Heavy Rain" appears on their collaborative album with Merzbow, Gensho; its deluxe CD version also features collaborative live performances of this song, "Melody," and "Angel."

Professional ratings
Aggregate scores
Source	Rating
Metacritic	72/100
Review scores
Source	Rating
AllMusic	4/5 stars
The Line of Best Fit	8.5/10
Pitchfork	7.8/10

== Background ==
The band began working on the album in early 2013. In the press release, the band stated:

their most all-encompassing effort to date. It is an amplification of Boris’ endless pursuit of musical extremes while moving aggressive, intense rock into new territories. Here, the band masterfully intermingles sludge-rock, blistering crust punk, shimmering shoegaze, epic thunderous doom, psychedelic melodies and just about everything else they’ve ever done. (The result) is something more bold, streamlined and powerful.

== Track listing ==
Japanese Version CD 1 (本編)
No.	Title	Length
1.	"Melody" (黒猫メロディ)	6:40
2.	"Vanilla"	4:15
3.	"Ghost of Romance" (あの人たち)	5:49
4.	"Heavy Rain" (雨)	6:12
5.	"Taiyo no Baka" (太陽のバカ)	3:36
6.	"Angel"	18:42
7.	"Quicksilver"	9:51
8.	"Siesta" (シエスタ)	2:50
Total length:		57:52

CD 2 (Another Noise)
No.	Title	Length
1.	"Bit"	9:35
2.	"Kimi no Yukue" (君の行方)	4:51
3.	"Yuushikai Revue" (有視界 Revue)	3:32
4.	"Discharge" (ディスチャージ)	5:32
Total length:		23:26

International
No.	Title	Length
1.	"Melody"	6:40
2.	"Vanilla"	4:15
3.	"Ghost of Romance"	5:50
4.	"Heavy Rain"	6:13
5.	"Taiyo no Baka"	3:36
6.	"Angel"	18:43
7.	"Quicksilver"	9:50
8.	"Siesta"	2:52
Total length:		57:59

Bonus Live Download Tracks
No.	Title	Length
1.	"Riot Sugar (Karlsruhe, Germany 20110701)"
2.	"8 (Madrid, Spain 20110624)"
3.	"Spoon (Karlsruhe, Germany 20110701)"
4.	"Flare (Montreal, Canada 20111024)"
5.	"Window Shopping (Montreal, Canada 20111024)"
6.	"Statement (Vienna, Austria 20110707)"

== Personnel ==
- Atsuo
- Wata
- Takeshi
