= Boris at Last -Feedbacker- =

Studio album by Boris
- Released: December 25, 2003
- Recorded: July – October 2003
- Studio: Peace Music
- Genres: Drone metal; post-rock; post-metal; noise rock
- Length: 43:51
- Labels: Diwphalanx; Conspiracy
- Producer: Boris

Boris chronology
Akuma no Uta (2003)	Boris at Last -Feedbacker- (2003)	The Thing Which Solomon Overlooked (2004)

Alternative cover
- LP release

Professional ratings
Review scores
Source	Rating
AllMusic	4.5/5 stars
Pitchfork	7.7/10
Sputnikmusic	5/5

Boris at Last -Feedbacker- (or simply called Feedbacker) is the fifth studio album by Japanese experimental music band Boris. The album, a single 43-minute track broken into 5 movements, incorporates many different rock elements. The band frequently revisits the song in concert.

On September 13, 2009, as a special set for the Flaming Lips-curated All Tomorrow's Parties New York 2009 in Monticello, Boris performed Feedbacker in its entirety. They performed the album again at the Pavement-curated ATP at Minehead Butlin's on May 15, 2010. An official DVD, limited to 500 copies, was released in 2005 by Diwphalanx Records. This DVD was originally an unofficial recording of the band performing the entirety of Feedbacker live in New York and entitled Bootleg -Feedbacker-. The official DVD release depicts a different member of the band lying in a pool of blood similar to Wata on the album cover.

== Track listing ==
The obi strip on the Japanese CD release lists only one track despite the track being indexed into five parts on the CD release; otherwise no track listing or timings are given on CD or LP.

On the LP release the track is split into two parts, one on each side. The original Japanese LP as well as the reissue on Third Man Records contains a locked groove on both sides.

No.	Title	Length
1.	"Feedbacker": "Part 1"; "Part 2"; "Part 3"; "Part 4"; "Part 5"	43:51: 9:38; 14:54; 5:52; 9:52; 3:32
Total length:		43:51

== Personnel ==
- Takeshi – guitar, bass, vocals
- Atsuo – drums, vocals
- Wata – guitar, effects
- Boris – production
- Souichirou Nakamura – mixing, mastering

== Pressing history ==
Year	Label	Format	Country	Out of print?	Notes
2003	Diwphalanx Records	CD	Japan	No	
2003	Diwphalanx Records	LP	Japan	Yes	Ltd. 500
2003	Conspiracy Records	CD	Belgium	No	
2003	Conspiracy Records	LP pic disc	Belgium	Yes	Ltd. 333
2005	Diwphalanx Records	DVD	Japan	Yes	Ltd. 500. Bootleg -Feedbacker-, features 3 different covers
2009	Conspiracy Records	LP	Belgium	No	Ltd. 200 on red vinyl
2019	Third Man Records	CD	US	No	Ltd. 2000 in digipak
2019	Third Man Records	LP	US	No	
2019	Third Man Records	LP	US	Yes	Tour edition, ltd. 400 on clear with red streaks vinyl
2019	Third Man Records	Digital	US	n/a	
