= Klatter =

Studio album by Boris with Merzbow
- Released: February 23, 2011
- Recorded: December 2004
- Studio: Sound Square
- Genre: Noise rock
- Length: 41:47
- Label: Daymare
- Producer: Boris with Merzbow

Boris with Merzbow chronology
Walrus / Groon (2007)	Klatter (2011)	Gensho (2016)

Boris chronology
Smile (2008)	Klatter (2011)	New Album (2011)

Merzbow chronology
ZaRa (2008)	Klatter (2011)	Jigokuhen (2011)

Professional ratings
Review scores
Source	Rating
PopMatters	7/10

Klatter is the third collaborative studio album and sixth release by the Japanese experimental rock band Boris and Japanese noise musician Merzbow. The album features re-recorded versions of "Akuma no Uta" and "Naki Kyoku" from Akuma no Uta, and a cover of the song "Jane" by the German progressive rock group of the same name. It was originally planned for release on Troubleman Unlimited in 2007 under the unconfirmed title Mellow Peak, but for unknown reasons, the release did not happen.

== Track listing ==
Side one
No.	Title	Writer(s)	Length
1.	"Introduction"		3:46
2.	"Akuma no Uta" (originally from Akuma no Uta)		6:39
3.	"Jane" (Jane cover)	Klaus Hess, Peter Panka, Wolfgang Krantz	13:04
Total length:			23:29

Side two
No.	Title	Length
1.	"Klatter 1"	6:09
2.	"Naki Kyoku" (originally from Akuma no Uta)	14:09
Total length:		20:18

== Personnel ==
All personnel credits adapted from the album notes.

Boris with Merzbow

- Takeshi – vocals, bass, guitar
- Wata – guitar
- Atsuo – drums, vocals
- Masami Akita – computer

Technical personnel

- Fangsanalsatan – recording, artwork
- Souichiro Nakamura – mixing

== Release history ==
Region	Date	Label	Format	Catalog	Quantity
Japan	February 23, 2011	Daymare	LP	DYMV-997	1000
