= No (Boris album) =

Studio album by Boris
- Released: 3 July 2020
- Recorded: 2020
- Genres: Hardcore punk; crust punk; metalcore; noise
- Length: 40:15
- Label: Fangs Anal Satan
- Producer: Boris

Boris chronology
Love & Evol (2019)	No (2020)	2R0I2P0 (2020)

Singles from No
- 1. "Loveless" Released: June 26, 2020

No (presented as NO in conjunction with its follow-up album W) is the twenty-fifth studio album by Japanese experimental band Boris, released 3 July 2020 on the band's label Fangs Anal Satan.

== Background ==
No was written and recorded quickly in March 2020 when Boris entered self-isolation due to the COVID-19 pandemic. Inspired by current international political trends, Boris described the album as "a mirror that gathers and reflects people’s negative energy at a different angle, one that is positive. That is the power and potential of the dark, extreme, and brutal noise music that we have experienced up to this point."

Unlike the lengthy experimental tracks that dominated the band's last few albums, No consists mostly of short, hardcore-based songs. It includes the cover song "Fundamental Error" by 1990s Japanese hardcore band Gudon. Japanese hardcore guitarist Katsumi makes a guest appearance. The album was self-released.

== Composition ==
With NO, Boris craft "thrashing and exhilarating" hardcore. It is also seen as a "harsh", "violent" fusion of crust punk and metallic hardcore. D-beat, sludge and thrash also appear, all wrapped in "thick squalling" noise.

== Critical reception ==
Professional ratings
Aggregate scores
Source	Rating
Metacritic	84/100
Review scores
Source	Rating
AllMusic	4.5/5 stars
Pitchfork	7.7/10

Upon its release, No received mostly positive reviews. At Metacritic, which assigns a normalized rating out of 100 to reviews from critics, the album received an average score of 84, which indicates "universal acclaim", based on 6 reviews. Pitchfork called No the best Boris album in a decade, squeezing the band's many interests into "these breathless 40 minutes." Treble magazine noted that the album "cuts right through the feedback and drone in the interest of a more direct delivery of thrashy riffs and crust-punk intensity." Post-Trash noted that the album is likely to satisfy both longtime Boris fans, plus fans of hardcore punk and heavy metal. A reviewer for Metal Storm noted that Boris is still capable of delivering surprising new sounds like those on No, after more than two dozen albums.

In a review for AllMusic, Thom Jurek claimed that "While hardly a political album, No reflects the frustration, anger, fear, and helplessness of the 2020 pandemic in a global zeitgeist. While its stylistic hallmarks are undeniably part of the band's musical signature, here they pay homage to the past while simultaneously reflecting the tense uncertainty of the present and future, directly and consistently, making No the band's strongest, most visionary outing since Pink."

== Track listing ==
No.	Title	Length
1.	"Genesis"	6:28
2.	"Anti-Gone"	2:57
3.	"Non Blood Lore"	3:41
4.	"Temple of Hatred"	2:06
5.	"Zerkalo"	5:03
6.	"HxCxHxC"	2:42
7.	"Kikinoue"	2:06
8.	"Lust"	2:51
9.	"Fundamental Error"	2:44
10.	"Loveless"	6:41
11.	"Interlude"	3:00
Total length:		40:15

== Personnel ==
- Takeshi – bass, guitar, vocals
- Wata – guitar, vocals, effects, echo
- Atsuo – drums, vocals
