= Boris (song) =

Song by the Melvins

Song by The Melvins

from the album Bullhead
- Released: 1991
- Recorded: 1990
- Genre: Stoner metal; Doom metal; Sludge metal
- Length: 8:34
- Label: Boner Records
- Songwriter: Buzz Osborne
- Producer: Jonathan Burnside

"Boris" is a song by the Melvins from their 1991 album, Bullhead. The song is a fan favorite and appears on the Melvins retrospective album/book Neither Here nor There and the live album Alive at the Fucker Club. The Japanese doom/drone metal band Boris named themselves after this song. The Boris song "Vomitself" from their album Amplifier Worship has a similar but slower riff at the start of the song.

The song was covered by Isis and Agoraphobic Nosebleed on the 2005 tribute album We Reach: The Music of the Melvins, and by Boris and Japanese noise musician Merzbow on their 2020 collaborative album 2R0I2P0.
