= Walrus / Groon =

Walrus/Groon

EP by Boris with Merzbow
- Released: April 2007
- Recorded: 2001
- Genre: Psychedelic rock, noise
- Length: 13:56
- Label: Hydra Head / Double H Noise Industries
- Producer: Boris with Merzbow

Boris with Merzbow chronology
Rock Dream (2007)	Walrus/Groon (2007)	Klatter (2011)

Boris chronology
Rainbow (2006)	Walrus/Groon (2007)	Long Hair and Tights (2007)

Merzbow chronology
Merzbear (2006)	Walrus/Groon (2007)	Coma Berenices (2007)

Alternative cover
- Gatefold artwork

Walrus/Groon is a collaborative 12" EP between the Japanese experimental doom band Boris and Japanese noise musician Merzbow. It was first sold at the 2007 South by Southwest festival in Austin, Texas.

"Walrus" is a cover of "I Am the Walrus" by The Beatles, specifically the Spooky Tooth 1970 version. "Groon" shares its name with a King Crimson improvisational piece, but has no musical resemblance. A different version of "Groon" appears on Switching Rethorics as "Vanlla Groon", [sic] featuring sampled drums/guitar and credited to Merzbow only. It was later compiled on Another Merzbow Records. The artwork references that of the Yes album Close to the Edge. The release was pressed on five different vinyl colors: black, yellow with green, white with green, white with yellow, and clear with green.

== Track listing ==
Side one
No.	Title	Writer(s)	Length
1.	"Walrus"	Lennon–McCartney	7:21

Side two
No.	Title	Length
1.	"Groon"	6:36

== Notes ==
- Mixed & mastered at Peace Music 2004

== Personnel ==
Boris with Merzbow

- Wata – guitar, vocals
- Takeshi – bass, vocals
- Atsuo – drums
- Masami Akita – computer

Production and visuals

- Eiji Hashizume – recording
- Souichirou Nakamura – mixing, mastering
- FangsAnalSatan – cover
- Keiko Yoshida – photography

== Pressing history ==
Year	Label	Format	Country	Notes
2007	Hydra head	12"	US	Limited edition of 1400 copies
