= Rainbow (Boris and Michio Kurihara album) =

Studio album by Boris with Michio Kurihara
- Released: (Japan) December 23rd, 2006 (United States) May 15th, 2007
- Recorded: January–July 2006
- Genre: Neo-psychedelia
- Length: 41:27
- Label: Pedal Records; Drag City; Inoxia Records
- Producer: fangsanalsatan & Souichirou Nakamura (Peace Music)

Boris chronology
| Altar (2006) | Rainbow (2006) | Walrus/Groon (2007) |

US version cover
- Drag City Records version cover

Professional ratings
Review scores
| Source | Rating |
|---|---|
| AllMusic | 4/5 stars |
| Metal Hammer | 8/10 stars |
| Pitchfork | (8.2/10) |
| Rock Sound | (8/10) |

Rainbow is a collaborative album between Japanese rock band Boris and guitarist Michio Kurihara. Wata contributed vocals to the title song, which has a music video made for it by Foodunited.

The album's initial release was done by Pedal Records, with liner notes in Portuguese. Drag City released this album in the United States on May 15, 2007, with a different 9th track, on CD format only.

In 2007, the album was also released on vinyl in two forms by Inoxia Records: an unlimited LP which contains the album (same as Pedal CD version), and a double LP box set with a 50-page photo book in a special cover, the album on clear vinyl, a second LP containing two bonus ambient tracks (also on clear vinyl), and a DVD featuring the music video for "Rainbow".

The title track on the 2xLP version features an alternate mix with a different guitar solo, and re-recorded studio takes were used on Boris / Variations + Live in Japan and Gensho. Additionally, live versions of the song are found on Rock Dream, Smile -Live at Wolf Creek-, the Live in Japan DVD included with Variations, and the bonus live album on the deluxe CD pressing of Gensho.

== Track listing ==
=== Pedal release ===
| No. | Title | Length |
|---|---|---|
| 1. | "Rafflesia" | 5:33 |
| 2. | "Rainbow" | 4:56 |
| 3. | "Starship Narrator" | 4:01 |
| 4. | "My Rain" | 1:49 |
| 5. | "Shine" | 4:37 |
| 6. | "You Laughed Like a Water Mark" | 7:02 |
| 7. | "Fuzzy Reactor" | 3:44 |
| 8. | "Sweet N°1" | 6:53 |
| 9. | "...And, I Want" | 2:52 |
| Total length: | | 41:27 |

=== Drag City release ===
| No. | Title | Length |
|---|---|---|
| 1. | "Rafflesia" | 5:33 |
| 2. | "Rainbow" | 4:56 |
| 3. | "Starship Narrator" | 4:01 |
| 4. | "My Rain" | 1:49 |
| 5. | "Shine" | 4:37 |
| 6. | "You Laughed Like a Water Mark" | 7:02 |
| 7. | "Fuzzy Reactor" | 3:44 |
| 8. | "Sweet N°1" | 6:53 |
| 9. | "No Sleep Till I Become Hollow" | 4:24 |
| Total length: | | 42:59 |

=== Inoxia 2-LP release ===
Side A
| No. | Title | Length |
|---|---|---|
| 1. | "Rafflesia" | 5:33 |
| 2. | "Arco-Íris" ("Rainbow") | 4:56 |
| 3. | "Narrador Da Espaçonave" ("Starship Narrator") | 4:01 |
| 4. | "Minha Chuva" ("My Rain") | 1:49 |
| 5. | "Brilho" ("Shine") | 4:37 |

Side B
| No. | Title | Length |
|---|---|---|
| 1. | "Você Sorriu Como Uma Marca D'Água" ("You Laughed Like a Water Mark") | 7:02 |
| 2. | "Reator Difuso" ("Fuzzy Reactor") | 3:44 |
| 3. | "Doce Número Um" ("Sweet N°1") | 6:53 |
| 4. | "... E, Eu Quero" ("...And, I Want") | 2:52 |

Side C
| No. | Title | Length |
|---|---|---|
| 1. | "Olhei Para O Vento Varrendo As Nuvens" ("I Looked Up at the Wind Sweeping Clouds Away") | 20:23 |

Side D
| No. | Title | Length |
|---|---|---|
| 1. | "Abraçando A Névoa" ("Embracing the Fog") | 19:37 |
| Total length: | | 81:27 |

== Personnel ==
- Michio Kurihara - guitars
- Takeshi - bass, vocals (tracks 1, 3, 5, 6, 8)
- Wata - keyboards, glockenspiel, vocals (track 2)
- Atsuo - drums, percussion

== Releases history ==
| Year | Label | Format | Country | Out of Print? | Notes |
|---|---|---|---|---|---|
| 2006 | Pedal Records | CD | Japan | No | |
| 2007 | Drag City | CD | U.S. | No | |
| 2007 | Inoxia Records | LP | Japan | No | |
| 2007 | Inoxia Records | 2LP Box | Japan | No | Ltd. 500. Includes 50 page book and DVD |
