= W (Boris album) =

Studio album by Boris
- Released: 21 January 2022
- Recorded: 2021
- Genres: Alternative rock; shoegaze; dream pop; experimental pop
- Length: 41:34
- Label: Sacred Bones
- Producer: Boris

Boris chronology
2R0I2P0 (2020)	W (2022)	Heavy Rocks (2022)

W is the twenty-sixth studio album by Japanese experimental band Boris, released 21 January 2022 on the Sacred Bones label.

== Background ==
W is intended to be a companion piece to the band's 2020 studio album NO, with the titles of the two albums combining to create the word NOW. Whereas the previous album focused on aggressive hardcore songs, W focuses on ethereal and ambient compositions to serve as a counterpoint. The two albums are intended to address the conflicts and uncertainty caused by the COVID-19 pandemic, with the band describing the project as “a continuous circle of harshness and healing".

Several reviewers noticed that W builds upon the song "Interlude" which closed the previous album, with other reviewers finding connections between various songs on each album. Among recent Boris albums, W is unusual because guitarist Wata performs all of the lead vocals.

== Critical reception ==
Professional ratings
Aggregate scores
Source	Rating
AnyDecentMusic?	7.6/10
Metacritic	81/100
Review scores
Source	Rating
AllMusic	3.5/5 stars
Beats Per Minute	86%
Clash	8/10
Loud and Quiet	8/10
Our Culture Mag	3.5/5 stars
Paste	8.0/10
Pitchfork	7.8/10

Upon its release, W received largely positive reviews. Greg Hyde of Backseat Mafia noted the haunting quality of Wata's vocals, and concluded that "fans of Boris should find it interesting to hear the band perform material that is far more ethereal than that which they will be used to hearing them play." Metal Injection noted that the album's ambient compositions appear to be influenced by artists as diverse as My Bloody Valentine, Portishead, and John Cage, and noted that the album highlights lesser-known new age and psychedelic components of Boris's sound. Reviewer Alex Deller of The Quietus noted that not all of the album is slow and ambient, with some of the band's customary aggressive riffs appearing occasionally to add a sense of variety. Deller called the album "an intricately-wrought, nest-like space that manages to intrigue and fascinate despite the familiar elements that have been used in its construction".

Invisible Oranges described W as shoegaze with elements of electronic music and drone metal, concluding that the album "takes their [Boris's] noisier textures to new heights while leveraging Wata’s vocals to alternately lull, scintillate, and shush the listener." In a review for AllMusic, Thom Jurek noted that Wata's quiet vocals often fail to rise above the sonic backdrop, but concluded that this contributes to the album's atmospheric nature while the album "offers a more elegant, restrained side of Boris than we've ever encountered before."

== Track listing ==
No.	Title	Length
1.	"I Want to Go to the Side Where You Can Touch..."	5:24
2.	"Icelina"	5:18
3.	"Drowning by Numbers"	4:16
4.	"Invitation"	2:56
5.	"The Fallen"	4:30
6.	"Beyond Good and Evil"	3:51
7.	"Old Projector"	4:38
8.	"You Will Know (Ohayo Version)"	9:20
9.	"Jozan"	1:25
Total length:		41:34

Japanese edition (bonus track)
No.	Title	Length
10.	"Soliloquy"	6:19
Total length:		47:56

== Personnel ==
Boris

- Takeshi – bass, guitar, vocals
- Wata – lead vocals, guitar, keyboards, accordion, echo, music box
- Atsuo – drums, electronics, percussion, vocals

Additional personnel

- SuGar Yoshinaga – production, guitar, synthesizer, vocals
- Koichi Hara – mastering, mixing
- Fangs Anal Satan – engineering, design
- Kotao Tomozawa – paintings
- Yoshihiro Mori – photography
- Yoshiko Ikeda – translation
