= Sun Baked Snow Cave =

Studio album by Boris with Merzbow
- Released: 23 August 2005
- Recorded: 2001–2004
- Genres: Drone metal; dark ambient; noise
- Length: 62:02
- Labels: Hydra Head, Double H Noise Industries
- Producer: Boris with Merzbow

Boris with Merzbow chronology
04092001 (2005)	Sun Baked Snow Cave (2005)	Rock Dream (2007)

Boris chronology
04092001 (2005)	Sun Baked Snow Cave (2005)	Dronevil (2005)

Merzbow chronology
Scene	Sun Baked Snow Cave (2005)	Senmaida (2005)

Professional ratings
Review scores
Source	Rating
AllMusic	3/5 stars
Delusions of Adequacy	Mixed
Dusted Magazine	Favorable
Exclaim!	Mixed
LAS Magazine	7.5/10
Pitchfork	6.5/10
Prefix Magazine	6.0/10
Robert Christgau	D+

Sun Baked Snow Cave is a collaborative album between Japanese experimental doom band Boris and Japanese noise musician Merzbow. The album consists of a single track that clocks in at over an hour in length. The album artwork was done by Sunn O))) member and regular Hydra Head designer Stephen O'Malley.

== Composition ==
Structurally, the album has three distinct sections: the opening 18 minutes consist primarily of quiet, sparse acoustic guitar strums backed by distant whirs and machine noises; a lengthy crossfade shifts the album into drone doom metal, with Merzbow's accentuation via harsh noise layers; eventually, the loud half-hour settles through movements of noise into 6 minutes of a quiet electric guitar and ambience coda.

== Release ==
In 2014, the album was released as a double LP. Released as a limited edition of 1,200 copies pressed on black, white, electric blue, or clear with blue streaks vinyl. Initially available on August 16, 2014 as a limited release on the Hydra Head online store and from Boris on tour. A general release followed on September 23. It was repressed in March 2015 on clear/blue splatter in an edition of 500 copies.

== Track listing ==
No.	Title	Length
1.	"Sun Baked Snow Cave"	62:02
Total length:		62:02

== Personnel ==
Boris with Merzbow

- Masami Akita – computer
- Takeshi – guitar, bass guitar
- Wata – guitar, echo
- Atsuo – feedback conduction, computer

Production

- Fangs Anal Satan – mixing
- Stephen O'Malley – artwork

== Notes ==
- Mastering at Peace Music 6 October 2004

== Release history ==
Region	Date	Label	Format	Quantity	Catalog	Notes
United States	August 23, 2005	Hydra Head	CD	Unknown	hh666-92 / 2xh-011	
United States	September 23, 2014	Hydra Head	LP	Unknown	hh666-92 / 2xh-011	Black vinyl
United States	September 23, 2014	Hydra Head	LP	Unknown	hh666-92 / 2xh-011	Clear with blue streaks
United States	September 23, 2014	Hydra Head	LP	Unknown	hh666-92 / 2xh-011	Electric blue
United States	September 23, 2014	Hydra Head	LP	Unknown	hh666-92 / 2xh-011	White
United States	March 2015	Hydra Head	LP	500	hh666-92 / 2xh-011	Clear/blue splatter
