= Akuma no Uta =

- 2005 reissue cover

Studio album by Boris
- Released: June 6, 2003 (original); 2005 (reissue)
- Recorded: January–March, 2003 at Peace Music
- Genres: Stoner rock; noise rock; sludge metal; acid rock
- Length: 31:59 (original); 39:00 (reissue)
- Labels: Diwphalanx (original); Southern Lord(SUNN41) (reissue)
- Producer: Boris

Boris chronology
Heavy Rocks (2002)	Akuma no Uta (2003)	Boris at Last: -Feedbacker- (2003)

Alternative cover
- Original 2003 cover

Akuma no Uta (悪魔の歌, The Devil's Song) is the fourth studio album by Japanese experimental music band Boris. Originally released in 2003 on Diwphalanx Records with minimalist artwork, it was re-issued in 2005 on Southern Lord Records with a different cover and more music.

== Releases ==
As well as running an additional 7 minutes, the opening track of the Southern Lord version is a totally different take; both use the same riff from "Akuma no Uta," but the original, shorter track repeats it far less and opens with over a minute of ambient, resonant amp noise absent from the longer version. An edit of the long version opens 2010 compilation Boris / Variations + Live in Japan, closely resembling the running length of the original intro, but sourced from a different point halfway through the 9 minute version and with a fade in.

Music videos were made for the songs "Ibitsu" and "Furi" and can be found on the 2003 DVD Live at Shimokitazawa Shelter. In addition to a short edit of the opening track, an alternate take of "Naki Kyoku" appears on Variations; it and "Akuma no Uta" were also re-recorded with Merzbow in 2004, for their 2011 collaboration called Klatter. Another collaboration with Merzbow for the title track – though its arrangement reflects the 9-minute take of "Introduction" more than the title track itself – is featured on their 2016 release Gensho, both as studio and live recordings.

In an interview with Rad Company, drummer Atsuo remarked that the album was recorded on analog tape in one take.

== Reception ==
Professional ratings
Review scores
Source	Rating
AllMusic	4/5 stars
Mojo	5/5 stars
Pitchfork	8.2/10

The album received praise for its cover and use of many distinct genres previously used by the band into a single album. In Mojo, Andrew Male said that the album "sounds like a blueprint for every future Boris release". Pitchfork Media placed Akuma No Uta at number 198 on their list of top 200 albums of the 2000s. In 2026, Rolling Stone praised guitarist Wata's solo in the title track as one of the greatest of all time, while Consequence named that song's central riff as one of the best of the 2000s.

== Cover art ==
While the original minimalist album cover has been part of Boris' website for an extensive period of time, its US cover version is a direct tribute to the cover of Nick Drake's album Bryter Layter. The notable difference in the design is Takeshi holding his double-neck Ibanez instead of the acoustic guitar that Drake holds in his cover. The album's original length was extended on the reissue to 39 minutes, exactly the same length as Bryter Layter.

Southern Lord Records released a vinyl pressing that had a third cover, in tribute to the band Venom. This was released as a picture disc with 700 copies featuring the "Nick Drake" cover, and 300 in the "Venom" style cover.

== Track listing ==
No.	Title	Length
1.	"イントロ" (Intro)	CD:2:35 LP:9:44
2.	"Ibitsu"	3:20
3.	"フリー" (Furi)	3:20
4.	"無き曲" (Naki Kyoku)	12:14
5.	"あの女の音量" (Ano Onna no Onryou)	6:29
6.	"あくまのうた" (Akuma no Uta)	4:01
Total length:		CD:31:59 LP:39:00

== Pressing history ==
Year	Label	Format	Country	Out of Print?	Notes
2003	Diwphalanx	CD	Japan	No	Minimalist art; the "original" cover
2003	Diwphalanx	LP	Japan	Yes	Same "Nick Drake" art as on the US CD (a tribute to the Bryter Layter album); ltd. 500 copies
2005	Southern Lord	CD	US	Yes	Nick Drake art
2005	Southern Lord	Picture disc LP	US	Yes	Nick Drake art; ltd. 700 copies
2005	Southern Lord	Picture disc LP	US	Yes	"Venom" art (a tribute to the Welcome to Hell album); ltd. 300 copies
2019	Third Man	LP	US	No	Nick Drake art
