= Altar (Sunn O))) and Boris album) =

2006 album by Sunn O))) and Boris

Altar

Studio album by Sunn O))) and Boris
- Released: October 31, 2006
- Recorded: 2006
- Genre: Drone metal, experimental
- Length: 53:42; 81:56 (with Disc Two)
- Label: Southern Lord; Inoxia Records; Daymare Records
- Producer: Sunn O)))

Sunn O))) chronology
Black One (2005)	Altar (2006)	Oracle (2007)

Boris chronology
Vein (2006)	Altar (2006)	Rainbow (2006)

Japanese Version Cover
- Inoxia Records version cover

Professional ratings
Review scores
Source	Rating
AllMusic	4/5 stars
Pitchfork	6.6/10
PopMatters	8/10
Tiny Mix Tapes	4/5 marks

Altar is a collaborative album by Japanese experimental music group Boris and American drone metal band Sunn O))), released on October 31, 2006, through Southern Lord Records (SUNN62). A limited two-CD edition was released on October 23 via Southern Lord with a 28-minute bonus track with Sunn O))), Boris, and Dylan Carlson, titled "Her Lips Were Wet with Venom". Inoxia Records released their own two-CD version in 2006 which features a bonus track on the first disc, "The Sinking Belle (Black Sheep)", and also features "Her Lips Were Wet with Venom" on disc 2. The triple-vinyl edition by Southern Lord contains all of the songs from their two-CD edition, additional pictures, and liner notes by Kim Thayil. The Daymare 3LP version was released March 23, 2007 and features a bonus track not found on any other version of this release: "The Sinking Belle (White Sheep)".

In addition to major players Sunn O))) and Boris, Altar also boasts an extensive roster of guest musicians/collaborators such as Kim Thayil (Soundgarden), Joe Preston (Earth, Thrones, Melvins, High on Fire), Phil Wandscher, Jesse Sykes, and Bill Herzog (of Jesse Sykes and the Sweet Hereafter) as well as long time Sunn O))) collaborators TOS Niewenhuizen and Rex Ritter.

On December 10, 2007, the bands collaborated at the Forum in London along with a number of the guests featured on Altar for a live performance. A 3LP picture disc version of the album, limited to 500 copies, was sold exclusively at this London show.

== Track listing ==
=== Disc One ===
1. "Etna" – 9:51
2. "N.L.T." – 3:49
3. "The Sinking Belle (Blue Sheep)" – 7:37
4. "Akuma no Kuma" – 7:52
5. "Fried Eagle Mind" – 9:47
6. "The Sinking Belle (Black Sheep)" – 5:05 (Japanese CD bonus track)
7. "The Sinking Belle (White Sheep)" – 4:36 (Japanese 3LP bonus track)
8. "Blood Swamp" – 14:46

=== Disc Two ===
1. "Her Lips Were Wet With Venom" – 28:14

== Personnel ==
Sunn O))) & Boris

- Greg Anderson - guitar (tracks 1.1, 1.8, 2.1), bass guitar (1.3, 1.5), bass (1.7), Moog Rogue (1.4)
- Stephen O'Malley - guitar (1.1, 1.8, 2.1), piano (1.3, 1.7), Korg MS-20 (1.4), clandestine guitar (1.5), califone (1.5)
- Wata - lead guitar (1.1, 2.1), guitar (1.3, 1.7, 1.8), space echo (1.3, 1.7), vocals & space guitar (1.5), space echo guitar (1.6)
- Takeshi - guitar (1.1, 1.3, 1.7, 1.8, 2.1), bass (1.1, 1.8, 2.1), bottle lead guitar (1.5)
- Atsuo - drums (1.1, 2.1), bowed cymbal (1.2), gong (1.2, 1.8), traps (1.3, 1.7), lead drums (1.4)

Additional musicians

- Bill Herzog - upright bass (1.2), vocals (1.3), snare (1.4)
- Jesse Sykes - vocals (1.3)
- Phil Wandscher - vocals (1.3)
- Adrienne Davies - percussion (1.3)
- Joe Preston - vocoder (1.4)
- Steve Moore - trombone (1.4)
- TOS Nieuwenhuizen - Oberheim (1.4), Moog Taurus (1.5–1.7), Moog Rogue (1.8), Korg MS-20 (2.1)
- Troy Swanson - Oberheim (1.4), Oberheim Four Voice (1.5)
- Randall Dunn - Korg MS-20 (1.4–1.6), sherman filter bank (1.4), echoplex (1.4), natural trouble (1.5)
- Mell Dettmer - Roland SH-101 (1.4)
- Eyvind Kang - viola, violin (1.6, 1.7)
- Kim Thayil - guitar (1.8)
- Rex Ritter - Moog Taurus (1.8, 2.1)
- Dylan Carlson - guitar (2.1)

Technical

- Produced By Sunn O)))
- Recorded, Engineered & Mixed By Randall Dunn
- Mastered By Mell Dettmer

== Pressing history ==
Year	Label	Format	Country	Out of Print?	Notes
2006	Southern Lord	CD	U.S.	No	
2006	Southern Lord	2CD	U.S.	Yes	Ltd. 5000. Includes bonus track "Her Lips Were Wet with Venom"
2006	Inoxia Records	2CD	Japan	Yes	Ltd. 1000. Includes bonus tracks "The Sinking Belle (Black Sheep)" and "Her Lips Were Wet with Venom"
2006	Southern Lord	3LP	U.S.	Yes	Ltd. 10,600. Includes bonus track, "Her Lips Were Wet with Venom"
2007	Inoxia Records	3LP	Japan	Yes	Ltd. 1000. Includes bonus tracks "The Sinking Belle (White Sheep)" and "Her Lips Were Wet with Venom"
2007	Southern Lord	3LP Pic Disc	U.S.	Yes	Ltd 500. Originally sold at London performance on December 10, 2007

== See also ==
- Southern Lord Records discography
