= Heavy Rocks (2022 album) =

Studio album by Boris
- Released: 12 August 2022
- Recorded: 2022
- Genre: Heavy metal, stoner rock
- Length: 41:34
- Label: Relapse Records
- Producer: Boris

Boris chronology
W (2022)	Heavy Rocks (2022)	Fade (2022)

Heavy Rocks is the twenty-seventh studio album by Japanese experimental band Boris, released on 12 August 2022 by Relapse Records. It is the third Boris album of this title, with the previous ones released in 2002 and 2011; all feature the band exploring hard rock and heavy metal sounds. The band described the album as both a celebration of their 30th anniversary and as part of a continuous evolution in their music. The album was preceded by the singles "She Is Burning", "Question 1", and "My Name Is Blank".

== Critical reception ==
Professional ratings
Review scores
Source	Rating
AllMusic	4/5 stars
Metal Injection	8/10
New Noise Magazine	4/5 stars

Upon its release, the album received generally favorable reviews from critics. Blabbermouth called the album "diverse and captivating" and concluded that it is "one of the year's most interesting left field, heavy music releases." Metal Injection described the album, along with its predecessors of the same title, as an attempt by Boris "to go yard on arcane '70s rock and proto-metal screwballs with a pine tar-lined avant-garde/experimental clobbering apparatus."

Jon Hadusek of Consequence described the album as illustrating the band's love of "1970s hard rock and heavy psych" while retaining their well-known experimental impulses. Writing for Yahoo News, Hadusek also noted that the album is a fitting continuation of Boris's previous Heavy Rocks albums, with the band "completely unleashed and in pure rock 'n' roll mode" in contrast to their more frequent drone-oriented albums.

Broadway World described the album as "channel[ling] the classic proto-metal sounds of the 70's into something all new." New Noise concluded that the album will satisfy fans of Boris's more straightforward rock albums of the past, but possibly not fans of their experimental works. Spectrum Culture called the album "an ebullient and energized collection of unashamed, to use the title of an earlier masterpiece, 'amplifier worship'." Thom Jurek of AllMusic concluded that "Boris continue to willfully and eagerly engage a tense musical restlessness that keeps them sounding unsettled, ambitious, often feral, and in a class of their own."

== Track listing ==
No.	Title	Length
1.	"She Is Burning"	3:41
2.	"Cramper"	3:23
3.	"My Name Is Blank"	3:15
4.	"Blah Blah Blah"	4:22
5.	"Question 1"	5:21
6.	"Nosferatou"	5:20
7.	"Ruins"	2:38
8.	"Ghostly imagination"	3:52
9.	"Chained"	3:34
10.	"(Not) Last Song"	6:10
Total length:		41:34

== Personnel ==
Boris

- Takeshi – bass, guitar, vocals
- Wata – guitar, keyboards, echo, vocals
- Atsuo – drums, percussion, vocals

Additional personnel

- SuGar Yoshinaga – production, guitar, synthesizer, vocals
- Koichi Hara – mastering, mixing
- Fangs Anal Satan – design
- Yoshiko Ikeda – translation
