= Dear (Boris album) =

Studio album by Boris
- Released: July 12, 2017
- Recorded: 2017
- Genres: Drone metal; stoner rock; doom rock; sludge metal
- Length: 93:06 (Daymare 2CD); 69:06 (Southern Lord CD)
- Labels: Sargent House, Daymare Recordings
- Producer: Boris

Boris chronology
Gensho (2016)	Dear (2017)	LφVE & EVφL (2019)

Dear is the twenty-third studio album by Japanese experimental band Boris. Released on 12 July 2017 in Japan through Daymare Recordings and internationally on 14 July 2017 through Sargent House, it marked the band's 25th anniversary. The music video for the track "Absolutego", which shares its title with the band's 1996 debut, was released in May 2017.

Dear was originally planned as a farewell album. Nevertheless, its sessions produced three albums' worth of material: ten tracks were cut for the record and the rest were reserved for future releases.

== Composition ==
With Dear, Boris crafted "straight-down-the-line" doom/stoner rock and "protracted" drone metal. Their roots in sludge metal also returned.

== Critical reception ==
Professional ratings
Aggregate scores
Source	Rating
Metacritic	78/100
Review scores
Source	Rating
AllMusic	4/5 stars
The A.V. Club	B−
Exclaim!	8/10
Loud and Quiet	6/10
Paste	6.9/10
PopMatters	7/10

Upon its release, Dear received positive reviews from music critics. At Metacritic, which assigns a normalized rating out of 100 to reviews from critics, the album received an average score of 78, which indicates "generally positive reviews", based on 14 reviews. AllMusic critic Thom Jurek wrote: "On Dear, Boris again prove their mettle as rock leviathans." Jurek further described the record as a "proof positive that this trio are far from running on empty." The A.V. Club's A.A. Dowd stated: "Even doom fanatics may yearn for a more consistent track list; one drawback to churning out new records at this frequency is that the output can be uneven, mixing the transcendent with the forgettable." Matthew Ritchie of Exclaim! commented: "If you dig deep enough, it's an album filled with surprises from a band that continue to impress."

== Track listing ==
=== Daymare 2CD ===
Disc 1
No.	Title	Length
1.	"D.O.W.N. -Domination of Waiting Noise-"	6:05
2.	"詩" ("DEADSONG")	6:42
3.	"絶対自我" ("Absolutego")	4:55
4.	"かのひと" ("Beyond")	6:39
5.	"蜉蝣" ("Kagero")	5:34
6.	"ビオトープ" ("Biotope")	5:32
7.	"The Power"	7:40
8.	"Memento Mori"	4:48
9.	"何処へ" ("Dystopia -Vanishing Point-")	11:51
10.	"Dear"	9:23
Total length:		69:06

Disc 2
No.	Title	Length
1.	"More"	7:17
2.	"Evil Perspective"	7:01
3.	"D.O.W.N -Domination of Waiting Noise-" (Full version)	9:42
Total length:		24:00

=== Sargent House CD ===
No.	Title	Length
1.	"D.O.W.N. -Domination of Waiting Noise-"	6:05
2.	"DEADSONG" (詩)	6:42
3.	"Absolutego" (絶対自我)	4:55
4.	"Beyond" (かのひと)	6:39
5.	"Kagero" (蜉蝣)	5:34
6.	"Biotope" (ビオトープ)	5:32
7.	"The Power"	7:40
8.	"Memento Mori"	4:48
9.	"Dystopia -Vanishing Point-" (何処へ)	11:51
10.	"Dear"	9:23
Total length:		69:06

== Personnel ==
Boris

- Takeshi – bass, guitar, vocals
- Wata – guitar, vocals, effects, echo
- Atsuo – drums, vocals
