= Love & Evol =

LφVE & EVφL

Studio album by Boris
- Released: 4 October 2019
- Recorded: 2019
- Genre: Ambient rock; dream pop; noise pop; drone metal
- Length: 62:12
- Label: Third Man Records
- Producer: Boris

Boris chronology
Dear (2017)	LφVE & EVφL (2019)	NO (2020)

Love & Evol (stylized as LφVE & EVφL) is the twenty-fourth studio album by Japanese experimental band Boris, released 4 October 2019 on Third Man Records. The band describes the release as two distinct but interconnected works, bearing the titles LφVE and EVφL respectively, "encapsulating conflicting connotations that interweave and become intricately entangled with one another, gradually eroding before becoming utterly singular." The release was intended to illustrate the different extremes of the sounds Boris has explored previously in their discography, and as a counterpoint to their darker and more aggressive previous album Dear.

== Composition ==
On Love & Evol, Boris fuses the "deep breath" of "pleasant" ambient rock with "seismic" drone metal. Dream pop and noise elements also show.

== Critical reception ==
Upon its release, the album received mixed to positive reviews. Thom Jurek of AllMusic called the album "an uneven whole" while "one wishes for more organic cohesion between the set's independent halves;" but concluded that "most longtime Boris fans will go for this since they're used to the band's bouncing between sonic poles." Grayson Haver Currin of Pitchfork issued a largely negative review, calling the band "self-satisfied" and offering songs "that, by and large, feel like adult-coloring-book versions of Boris triumphs past." Spencer Nafekh-Blanchette of Exclaim! was more positive, describing the album as "mixing dissonant ambience with unrelenting distortion to create soundscapes that can be felt with every fibre of your being," and concluding that "Boris create layered atmospheres that are equal parts beautiful and menacing."

== Track listing ==
Album 1: LφVE
No.	Title	Length
1.	"Away from You"	7:36
2.	"Coma"	7:47
3.	"EVOL"	16:29
Total length:		31:52

Album 2: EVφL
No.	Title	Length
1.	"uzume"	8:31
2.	"LOVE"	6:46
3.	"In the Pain(t)"	3:40
4.	"Shadow of Skull"	11:23
Total length:		30:20

== Personnel ==
- Takeshi – bass, guitar, vocals
- Wata – guitar, vocals, effects, echo
- Atsuo – drums, vocals
