= Boris (band) =

Japanese rock band

Boris ボリス
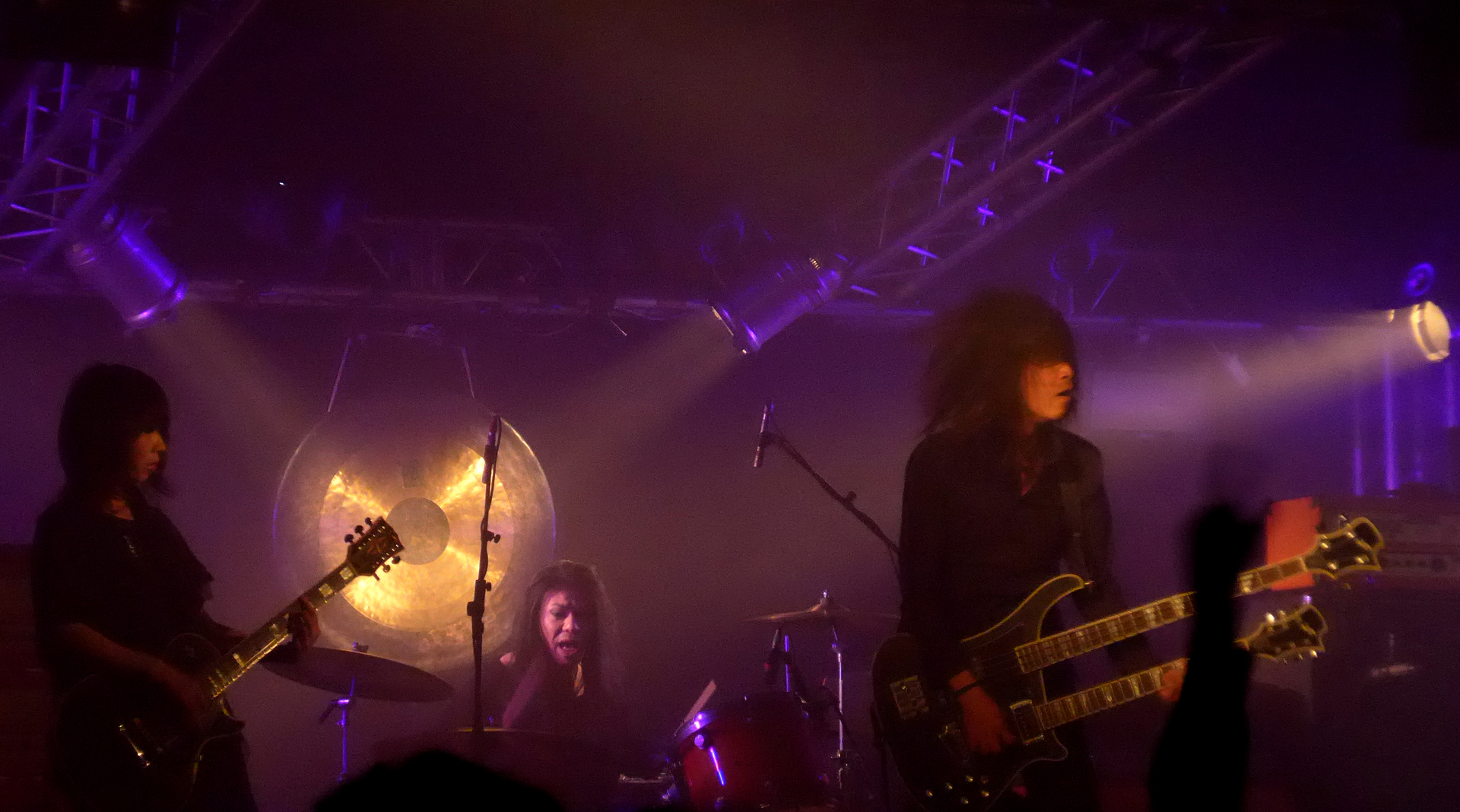
- Boris performing in St. Petersburg, 2016 (L-R: Wata, Atsuo, Takeshi)

Background information
- Origin: Tokyo, Japan
- Genres: Metal; stoner rock; noise rock; drone; post-rock
- Years active: 1992–present
- Labels: Fangs Anal Satan; Southern Lord; Hydra Head; Inoxia; Diwphalanx; Conspiracy; UK Project; Quatro, Pedal; Sacred Bones; Sargent House; Third Man
- Members: Atsuo; Takeshi; Wata
- Past members: Nagata
- Website: borisheavyrocks.com

Boris (ボリス, Borisu) is a Japanese metal band that draws variously from styles such as sludge metal, drone, noise, psychedelia, and minimalism. Formed in 1992 in Tokyo, the band is composed of drummer Atsuo, guitarist/bassist Takeshi, and guitarist/keyboardist Wata. All three members provide lead vocals. Boris has released more than 20 studio albums on various labels around the world, as well as a variety of live albums, compilations, EPs, singles, and collaborative albums.

== History ==
Boris was originally a four-piece band with Atsuo on lead vocals, Wata on guitar, Takeshi on bass, and Nagata on drums. The band is named after a song of the same name on the Melvins album Bullhead. Boris's debut single (often described as an album) Absolutego was released in 1996 on their own record label Fangs Anal Satan. Nagata departed in 1996 and Atsuo switched to drums. Wata expanded her duties to lead guitar and keyboards; Takeshi took on bass and rhythm guitar duties, and since 2001 he has used double-necked guitar/bass. All three adopted lead vocal duties, and the band has remained a three-piece ever since with occasional support from touring musicians.

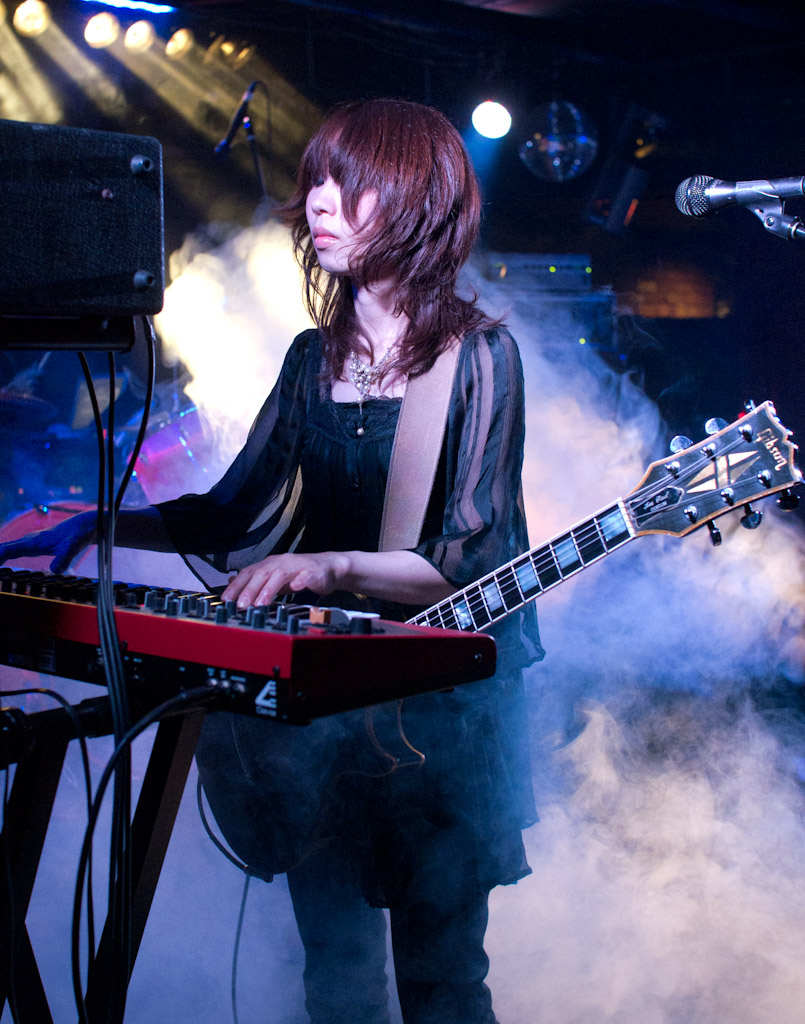
Wata, Vancouver, October 2011

In Japan, Boris release their music on indie labels such as Inoxia Records. Though lesser known in their home country, a series of reissues of their early albums on the American label Southern Lord Records caused a surge of popularity in North America. Boris also collaborates with other artists regularly, first on the 1998 album Black: Implication Flooding with experimental musician Keiji Haino. They have released several collaborative albums with noise artist Merzbow, and have released collaborative albums with international artists including Sunn O))), Keiji Haino, Michio Kurihara, and Ian Astbury.

Their international popularity was bolstered by their 2005 album Pink, which was met with considerable critical praise and a strong response from music fans when reissued in the US on Southern Lord. Blender magazine and SPIN magazine both named it one of 2006's best albums. The album also topped the metal section of Canadian magazine Exclaim!'s 2006 Reader's Poll, and it was named in the top 10 of Pitchfork Media's Top 50 Records of 2006. They also appeared on the avant-garde metal soundtrack to Jim Jarmusch's film The Limits of Control in 2009. Regarding Boris, Jarmusch said that "what's really remarkable is when they play live they're in the mode, in a way, of jazz musicians, not structurally or musically, but the way they listen to what the others are doing and build on it. Each time they play something it's obviously different, every time."

Boris focus a lot of their time on touring. In an interview, Atsuo said:

"That we tour so much and release so many albums, I think it is representative of what we're about. Direct communication is something we've lost in this day and age. It's a shame – [even] interviews are over [the] phone. I think it's important to see people face to face – that's why it's so important to go on tour. It's something very basic to humans that we've lost lately."

Boris received additional international exposure when they opened for Nine Inch Nails on part of the 2008 segment of the Lights in the Sky tour. From 2011 to 2017, they released several albums on Sargent House Records, and regularly reissue previous albums in new formats. In 2017, the band's 25th anniversary, they considered retirement after one final album. However, a successful songwriting and recording process for that album, Dear, encouraged the band to continue. While self-isolating during the COVID-19 pandemic, Boris self-released the rock-oriented album NO and the ambient album W, with the two constituting a project called NOW. The third volume in the album series Heavy Rocks, featuring explorations of hard rock and heavy metal sounds, was released in 2022. They released two other albums that year, with Fade, which focuses on drone metal, appearing with no prior notice.

== Musical style and equipment ==
Throughout their career, Boris have made deliberate efforts to avoid a strong association with any musical style. In particular, they do not consider themselves a heavy metal band despite frequently being categorized as such. In an interview, drummer Atsuo stated: "Having some kind of preconceived message or theme is very boring to me. It becomes a crutch. Just say what you want to say."

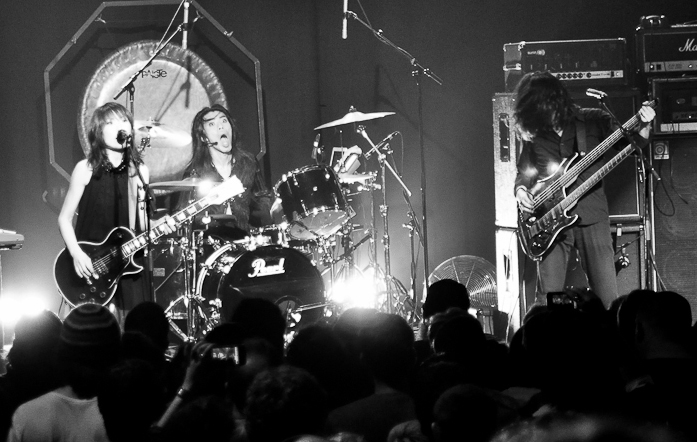
The band perform in Australia, 2012

The wide variety of genres used by reviewers to describe Boris's music include experimental music, experimental rock, noise music, noise rock, experimental/avant-garde metal, doom metal, post-metal, drone metal, sludge metal, psychedelic music, psychedelic rock, psychedelic metal, and stoner rock. While they first emerged as a sludge metal band with strong hardcore punk influences, their subsequent releases have employed elements of a wide variety of genres, including drone music, old-school industrial music, ambient music, acid rock, garage rock, shoegaze, dream pop, J-pop, and crust punk.

For example, the band's debut release Absolutego featured a "65-minute track of oozing, slow motion, Melvins-inspired drone rock/metal," while their second release and debut official album Amplifier Worship incorporated psychedelia and jam band influences. Their 2000 album Flood incorporated elements from drone. Akuma no Uta and Pink engaged in different stylistic experimentation, including shoegazing, stoner rock, and post-rock. Vein (2007) was released in "Hardcore" and "Noise" versions, whereas New Album (2011) experimented with electronica and dream pop. The album Noise (2014) featured elements from grunge music.

In the studio, Boris self-records using their own in-house equipment. They use minimal overdubs, recording mostly live. Boris uses many different effects pedals, amplifiers, and other guitar accessories while performing live. Wata uses an E-bow to achieve bow-like sounds or to manipulate feedback. Wata also occasionally plays an accordion and keyboards in concert.

Takeshi typically plays a double-necked bass/guitar live, which allows him to play both rhythm guitar during the band's lengthier tracks as well as bass guitar during their more traditional tracks, without needing to switch instruments. They also play with extremely low tunings, such as A# standard, to achieve a heavier sound. Takeshi used triple octave tuning for the track "Loveless", from their album No. On some tours starting in 2019, Atsuo switches to a full-time lead singer role and the band makes use of a touring drummer.

== Members ==
=== Current members ===
- Takeshi (Ohtani) – vocals, bass guitar, rhythm guitar (1992–present)
- Wata (Yoko Mizuno) – vocals, lead guitar, keyboards (1992–present)
- Atsuo (Mizuno) – vocals (1992–present), drums, tambourine, electronics (1996–present)

=== Former members ===
- Nagata – drums (1992–1996)

=== Support/touring musicians ===
- Michio Kurihara – guitars (2007–2012)
- Mike Engle – drums (2019, 2022)
- Muchio – drums (2021–present)

== Discography ==
Studio albums

- Absolutego (1996)
- Amplifier Worship (1998)
- Flood (2000)
- Heavy Rocks (2002)
- Akuma no Uta (2003)
- Boris at Last -Feedbacker- (2003)
- The Thing Which Solomon Overlooked (2004)
- Dronevil (2005)
- Soundtrack from the Film Mabuta no Ura (2005)
- Pink (2005)
- The Thing Which Solomon Overlooked 2 (2006)
- The Thing Which Solomon Overlooked 3 (2006)
- Vein (2006)
- Smile (2008)
- New Album (2011)
- Heavy Rocks (2011)
- Attention Please (2011)
- Präparat (2013)
- Noise (2014)
- The Thing Which Solomon Overlooked Extra (2014)
- Urban Dance (2015)
- Warpath (2015)
- Asia (2015)
- Dear (2017)
- Love & Evol (2019)
- NO (2020)
- W (2022)
- Heavy Rocks (2022)
- Fade (2022)

Collaboration albums

- Black: Implication Flooding (w/ Keiji Haino, 1998)
- Megatone (w/ Merzbow, 2002)
- 04092001 (w/ Merzbow, 2004)
- Sun Baked Snow Cave (w/ Merzbow, 2005)
- Altar (w/ Sunn O))), 2006)
- Rainbow (w/ Michio Kurihara, 2006/2007)
- Walrus/Groon (w/ Merzbow, 2007)
- Rock Dream (live, w/ Merzbow, 2007)
- Cloud Chamber (w/ Michio Kurihara, 2008)
- BXI (w/ Ian Astbury, 2010)
- Klatter (w/ Merzbow, 2011)
- EROS (w/ Endon, 2015)
- Gensho (w/ Merzbow, 2016)
- Refrain (w/ Z.O.A., 2020)
- 2R0I2P0 (w/ Merzbow, 2020)
- Bright New Disease (w/ Uniform, 2023)
- Hello There (w/ Coaltar of the Deepers, 2024)
