= Michio Kurihara =

Japanese guitarist (born 1961)

Michio Kurihara 栗原ミチオ
- Born: 23 November 1961 (age 64); Tokyo, Japan
- Occupation: Musician
- Instrument: Guitar
- Years active: 1984–present
- Labels: Daymare Recordings, Diwphalanx

Michio Kurihara (栗原ミチオ, Kurihara Michio) (born 23 November 1961) is a Japanese guitarist who has played with Ai Aso, Cosmic Invention, Hazama, Ensemble Pearl, Overhang Party, Onna, Ghost, Damon & Naomi, Boris, Yura Yura Teikoku, YBO2, and The Stars (formerly known as White Heaven), among others. He has also released a solo album, Sunset Notes.

He collaborated with Boris on the 2006 album, Rainbow, and the 2008 album, Cloud Chamber.

Kurihara co-formed Ensemble Pearl, a supergroup collective featuring Stephen O'Malley, Atsuo (Boris), and William Herzog, releasing a self-titled record in 2013. The Quietus described him as "one of Japan’s most notable guitarists, with a very distinctive, elemental and fetishised psych sound".

== Discography ==
- Sunset Notes (2005)
- Rainbow with Boris (2006)
- Cloud Chamber with Boris (2008)
- A Sky Record (2021)
