= Heavy Rocks (2002 album) =

Studio album by Boris
- Released: April 26, 2002
- Recorded: July–September 2001
- Studio: Bazooka Studio
- Genres: Heavy metal; stoner rock; punk rock
- Length: 46:27
- Label: Quattro/UK Discs
- Producer: Boris

Boris chronology
| Megatone (2002) | Heavy Rocks (2002) | Akuma no Uta (2003) |

Singles from Heavy Rocks
- 1. "1970 / Wareruraido" Released: December 2002

Heavy Rocks is the third studio album by Japanese band Boris, released in 2002. It is the first of three Boris albums titled Heavy Rocks, with the others released in 2011 and 2022; all feature the band exploring hard rock and heavy metal sounds.

Alternate takes of "1970" and "Wareruraido" were used for a single, while re-recordings of "Korosu" and "1970" with Michio Kurihara appear on Boris / Variations + Live in Japan. Music videos were shot for the tracks "1970" and "Korosu" and were originally viewable on FoodUnited's website. Both videos were later included on the 2003 DVD Live at Shimokitazawa Shelter.

The album was issued digitally and on vinyl for the first time in September 2023, through Third Man Records. That reissue was accompanied by an American tour in which the band played the album in its entirety.

== Track listing ==
All tracks are written by Boris.

| No. | Title | Length |
|---|---|---|
| 1. | "Heavy Friends" | 4:49 |
| 2. | "Korosu" (殺す) | 4:48 |
| 3. | "Dyna-Soar" | 3:44 |
| 4. | "Wareruraido" (ワレルライド) | 2:44 |
| 5. | "Soft Edge" | 3:50 |
| 6. | "Rattlesnake" | 2:16 |
| 7. | "Death Valley" | 6:56 |
| 8. | "Koei" (孤映) | 3:54 |
| 9. | "Kane -The Bell Tower of a Sign-" (鐘 -The Bell Tower of a Sign-) | 8:28 |
| 10. | "1970" | 4:58 |
| Total length: | | 46:27 |

=== 2023 Third Man Records Version ===
This is the version on the first ever 2xLP pressing, new CD pressing, and streaming services as of October 2023. "Rattlesnake" has been moved to the end of the album proper, and in its previous spot is a bonus track "Dronevil" (written by Boris).

Side A
| No. | Title | Length |
|---|---|---|
| 1. | "Heavy Friends" | 4:49 |
| 2. | "Korosu" | 4:48 |
| 3. | "Dyna-Soar" | 3:44 |
| 4. | "Wareruraido" | 2:44 |

Side B
| No. | Title | Length |
|---|---|---|
| 1. | "Soft Edge" | 3:50 |
| 2. | "Dronevil" (Bonus Track) | 1:42 |
| 3. | "Death Valley" | 6:55 |
| 4. | "Koei" | 3:53 |

Side C
| No. | Title | Length |
|---|---|---|
| 1. | "Kane -The Bell Tower of a Sign-" | 8:28 |
| 2. | "1970" | 5:01 |

Side D
| No. | Title | Length |
|---|---|---|
| 1. | "Rattlesnake" | 2:26 |
| 2. | "Wareruraido" (Demo Version) | 2:41 |
| 3. | "1970" (Demo Version) | 4:55 |
| Total length: | | 55:59 |

== Personnel ==
Boris

- Takeshi – vocals, bass, and guitar
- Wata – guitar and echo
- Atsuo – drums, percussions, and vocals

Guest musicians

- Lori S. – vocals on "Heavy Friends"
- Maso Yamazaki – analog synthesizer on "Dyna-Soar"
- Masami Akita – PowerBook on "Death Valley" (incorrectly attributed to "ワレルライド" in the CD liner notes)
- Eddie Legend – lead guitar on "Koei"
- Komi – vocals on "Kane -The Bell Tower of a Sign-"

Production

- Tetsuya "Cherry" Tochigi – main engineer
- Takumi Iyobe – assistant engineer
- Osamu Kon – assistant engineer
- Kazuhiko Itoh – assistant engineer
- Souichirou Nakamura – mastering engineer
- Higasayama "Hatchaku" Kunihito – recording crew
- Fangs Anal Satan – design
- Furuyong – logotype
- Eri Shibata – photos

== Pressing history ==
| Year | Label | Format | Catalog No. | Country | Out of Print? | Notes |
|---|---|---|---|---|---|---|
| April 26, 2002 | Quattro/UK Discs | CD | UKQT-005 | Japan | No | Reprinted in 2009 |
| September 8, 2023 | Third Man Records | CD, 2xLP | TMR778LP | United States | No | De facto streaming version |
