= Dronevil =

2005 studio album by Boris

Studio album by Boris
- Released: February 28, 2005 (LP); August 8, 2006 (CD)
- Recorded: 2004
- Studios: Sound Square; Kitakyushu, Japan
- Genres: Drone; doom metal; psychedelic; dark ambient
- Length: 75:58 (LP); 124:35 (CD)
- Labels: Fangs Anal Satan; Misanthropic Agenda (LP); Inoxia (CD); Relapse Records (LP; remix)
- Producer: Boris

Boris chronology
Sun Baked Snow Cave (2005)	Dronevil (2005)	Soundtrack from the Film Mabuta no Ura (2005)

Dronevil -Final-
- Cover of repress on Inoxia Records

Professional ratings
Review scores
Source	Rating
AllMusic	link
Pitchfork Media	(8.0/10) link
Aversionline	(7/10) link

Dronevil is the seventh studio album by the Japanese experimental band Boris. It is a double album: the first LP, Drone, showcases a more ambient sound, while the second LP, Evil, showcases a heavy guitar-oriented doom metal sound. Though the two sides can be heard separately, the original intention is for both to be played simultaneously.

The album was originally released on double vinyl with the artwork for this release done by Stephen O'Malley of Sunn O))). 1,000 copies were pressed of this album, 200 of which were printed on grey vinyl with the other 800 copies pressed on black vinyl.

The album was re-released through Inoxia Records in 2006 under the name Dronevil -Final- on (double) CD format. This version includes two additional tracks not found on the original release.

An alternate mix of "The Evil One Which Sobs"/"Interference Demon" appears on Heavy Metal Me, while a live version appears on Archive II.

In 2025, a remixed version of the album, titled Dronevil -Example-, was announced, to be released by Relapse Records. This release included new versions of the songs previously released on Dronevil -Final-, with each pair of songs combined into a single new song.

== Track listing ==
=== Dronevil ===
LP 1: Drone
No.	Title	Length
1.	"Giddiness Throne"	20:01
2.	"Interference Demon"	19:57

LP 2: Evil
No.	Title	Length
1.	"Evil Wave Form"	19:51
2.	"The Evil One Which Sobs"	16:09
Total length:		75:58

=== Dronevil -Final- ===
CD 1: Drone
No.	Title	Length
1.	"ほどけていく" (Hodokete iku; "Loose")	21:34
2.	"めまいの椅子" (Memai no isu; "Giddiness Throne")	20:22
3.	"干渉" (Kanshou; "Interference Demon")	19:42

CD 2: Evil
No.	Title	Length
1.	"振りきれた風景" (Furikireta fuukei; "Red")	21:30
2.	"ふりおろす" (Furiorosu; "Evil Wave Form")	19:43
3.	"泣きたがるスピード" (Nakitagaru supiido; "The Evil One Which Sobs")	21:44
Total length:		124:35

=== Dronevil -Example- ===
LP 1
No.	Title	Length
1.	"loose x red"	21:34
2.	"giddiness throne x evil wave form"	20:22

LP 2
No.	Title	Length
1.	"interference demon x the evilone which sobs"	21:44
2.	"a bao a qu - dronevil mix-"	17:37
Total length:		82:17

== Personnel ==
Boris

- Atsuo – drums, production
- Takeshi – guitar, bass, production
- Wata – guitar, effects, production

Technical

- Enju Tanahashi – executive producer
- Souichirou Nakamura – mixing, mastering
- Stephen O'Malley – design

== Pressing history ==
Year	Label	Format	Country	Out of Print?	Notes
2005	Misanthropic Agenda	2LP	U.S.	Yes	Ltd. 1000. 200 gray vinyl, 800 black vinyl
2006	Inoxia Records	2CD	Japan	No	
2025	Relapse Records	2LP	U.S.	No	Remixed version
