= Amplifier Worship =

Studio album by Boris
- Released: November 26, 1998; March 11, 2003 (Reissue); June 2, 2010 (Reissue); November 13, 2020 (Reissue); September 27, 2024 (Reissue)
- Recorded: Sound Crew, August–September 1998
- Genres: Doom metal; drone metal; sludge metal
- Length: 63:52
- Labels: Mangrove (ROOT-015CD); Southern Lord (SUNN24); Third Man (TMR687)
- Producer: Boris

Boris chronology
Absolutego (1996)	Amplifier Worship (1998)	Black: Implication Flooding (1998)

Alternative cover
- Southern Lord Reissue Artwork

Professional ratings
Review scores
Source	Rating
AllMusic	4/5 stars

Amplifier Worship is the debut studio album by Japanese band Boris, released originally on November 26, 1998, later reissued by American labels Southern Lord and Third Man in 2003, 2010, and 2024.

This album marks the first time that Takeshi performed lead vocals for the band (although Atsuo performs lead vocals on "Huge"). "Vomitself" was written and laid down separately at Sound Square while the other four songs were recorded at Sound Crew. Japanese production company (and friends of the band) FoodUnited created videos for the songs "Hama" and "Kuruimizu". These were initially only available in 1998 on a promotional VHS but following the band creating their own (subscription) YouTube Channel in 2023, these videos are again available to watch.

== History ==
Amplifier Worship was originally released in 1998 exclusively on CD locally in Japan by the Mangrove label - an independent Tokyo based record label that mainly focused on punk, hard-rock, metal and fringe heavy music from Japan. In the early 90s it evolved into the physical record store Record Store Base - located in Suginami, Tokyo, that still operates today.

The first reissue of the album was done by American label Southern Lord in 2003. This was a CD only reissue for international release. The audio is the same as the original Mangrove release, however the artwork had been reimagined by Stephen O'Malley. The initial pressing of this release was in a green colored jewel case with some copies including an edible gummy worm in the CD spine. At time of release, there were rumors that said worm had hallucinogenic properties akin to those of LSD when eaten though these rumors have been denied by Southern Lord, the band, and people who actually ate their worm.

The Southern Lord vinyl reissue in 2010 features updated artwork (again handled by Stephen O'Malley) and was pressed in editions of 1,000 copies on green vinyl and 2,000 copies on black vinyl, both at 180gram. Where as absolutego was remixed for the vinyl reissue, Amplifier Worship had the original audio mastered for vinyl. This vinyl pressing uses the same crossfading despite the track order change and the inability to segue across sides; these issues are solved either with new crossfades (the two songs on side A) or cut offs (the rest of the sides).

In 2020 the album was reissued on vinyl in America for the second time, this time through Third Man Records. The original 1998 artwork was reinstated and the original recordings were fully remastered. The music was also released for digital/streaming for the first time. The vinyl was pressed in black and limited edition colored vinyl as well as a tour edition vinyl variant. At the same time the Mangrove Label in Japan reissued on the album on CD. Using the original artwork and the remastered audio, this edition was released in a fold out digipak (as opposed to the original jewel case).

A "25th Anniversary Edition" of the album was released by Third Man Records in September 2024. This one time vinyl pressing was on colored vinyl and featured re-imagined artwork by Arron Horkey (at the request of the band). Boris in their press release at the time noted about the artwork that "This idea came from Aaron’s real-time experience of ‘gummy worms in the jewel case’ at the time of the ‘Amplifier Worship’ CD release.”

== Track listing ==
Some of the track titles were originally released in Japanese (2, 3, and 4)

CD
No.	Title	Length
1.	"Huge"	9:14
2.	"Ganbou-Ki" (願望魕)	15:44
3.	"Hama" (蟾蜍)	7:30
4.	"Kuruimizu" (狂水)	14:27
5.	"Vomitself"	16:57
Total length:		63:52

Vinyl (Side A)
No.	Title	Length
1.	"Huge"	9:15
2.	"Hama" (蟾蜍)	7:28

Side B
No.	Title	Length
1.	"Ganbou-Ki" (願望魕)	16:55

Side C
No.	Title	Length
1.	"Kuruimizu" (狂水)	14:57

Side D
No.	Title	Length
1.	"Vomitself"	16:57
Total length:		65:32

== Personnel ==
- Wata - guitar, effects and electronics
- Takeshi - vocals, bass and electronics
- Atsuo - vocals, drums, cymbal and electronic drums
- Osamu Seino - engineer (tracks 1 to 4)
- Eiji Hashizume - engineer (track 5)
- Fangs Anal Satan - artwork

== Pressing history ==
Year	Label	Format	Country	Out of print?	Notes
1998	Mangrove	CD	Japan	Yes	Originally released in jewel case format. Catalogue Number: Root-015
2003	Southern Lord	CD	US	Yes	First CD pressing was in green colored jewel case. Some copies came with an edible gummy worm in the spine. 2-second gaps between songs reminiscent of a CD-R. Different artwork from Japanese edition.
2003	Southern Lord	CD	US	Yes	Second CD pressing in clear jewel case. Gaps between songs removed. Different artwork from Japanese edition.
2010	Southern Lord	Vinyl	US	Yes	Total pressing: 2000 black vinyl, 1000 green vinyl. Updated artwork based on 2003 CD edition
2020	Third Man	Vinyl	US	No	Vinyl pressing in black and green store variants (green edition 850 copies) Fan Club variant of 100 copies on white/green mix.
2020	Mangrove	CD	Japan	No	Newly remastered audio. Original Artwork restored. Packaging updated for Digipak release. Japan only release. Catalogue Number: Root-088
2024	Third Man	Vinyl	US	Yes	25th Anniversary Edition. One time pressing with "Green Swirl" and "Red Swirl variants. Redesigned artwork. Sold on 2025 US Tour.
