= Diwphalanx Records =

Diwphalanx
- Parent company: Disk Union
- Distributor: DIW Products Group
- Genre: Heavy metal, doom metal, experimental rock, punk rock
- Country of origin: Japan
- Official website: www.diwphalanx.com

Diwphalanx Records is a Japanese rock music record label, which primarily releases Japanese bands.

== Artist list ==
- Antiseen
- Balzac
- Banana Shakes
- Bitter Sweet Generation
- Blue Beat Players
- Boris
- Church of Misery
- Central
- Cool Wise Men
- Dead Pan Speakers
- Doping Panda
- Earth Blow
- Eternal Elysium
- Fishdog
- Forevers
- Gas Burner
- G.A.T.E.S
- Hellbent
- Greenmachine
- Kojima
- Little Masta
- Low IQ 01
- Oi-Skall Mates
- Red Hot Rockin' Hood
- Rocky & the Sweden
- Rude Bones
- Rude Pressures
- Sandiest
- Saturdaynightz
- Scafull King
- Shoulder Hopper
- Sledgehammer 鐵槌
- Smash Your Face
- Snail Ramp
- Stupid Babies Go Mad
- Taisho (大将)
- The Sideburns
- Tijuana Brooks
- Tropical Gorilla
- United Skates
- Wataru Buster

== See also ==
- List of record labels
