= Hungarian metal =

Heavy metal music scene of Hungary

Hungarian metal is the heavy metal music scene of Hungary. One of the most popular and well-known band is Attila Csihar's Tormentor. In 2023, Hungarian rock band The Hellfreaks compiled a Loudwire of ten bands that "define Hungary's metal scene", which included Mad Robots, Thy Catafalque, Subscribe, Blind Myself, Lazarvs, FreshFabrik, Ektomorf, Neck Sprain, The Southern Oracle. Loudwire added that The Hellfreaks helped to "increase the Hungarian metal scene's visibility on a global scale".

Hungary was represented by a metal band AWS at Eurovision Song Contest 2018.

Kirkus Reviews, in passing, chose heavy metal genre to characterize Hungarian music, though "even the hardest-core Hungarian heavy metal headbanger will acknowledge a fondness for Muzsikás, Márta, and táncház".

== Notable Hungarian metal bands and artists ==
- AWS
- Blind Myself
- Burial Chamber Trio
- C.A.F.B.
- Csihar, Attila
- Dalriada
- Ektomorf
- FreshFabrik
- Idoru, The
- Jogos Önvédelem
- Lazarvs
- Leander Kills
- Leander Rising
- Moby Dick
- Newborn
- P. Mobil
- Pokolgép
- Schram, Dávid (recording producer)
- Sear Bliss
- Shell Beach
- Superbutt
- Thy Catafalque
- Tormentor
- Without Face
- Wisdom

== Gallery ==
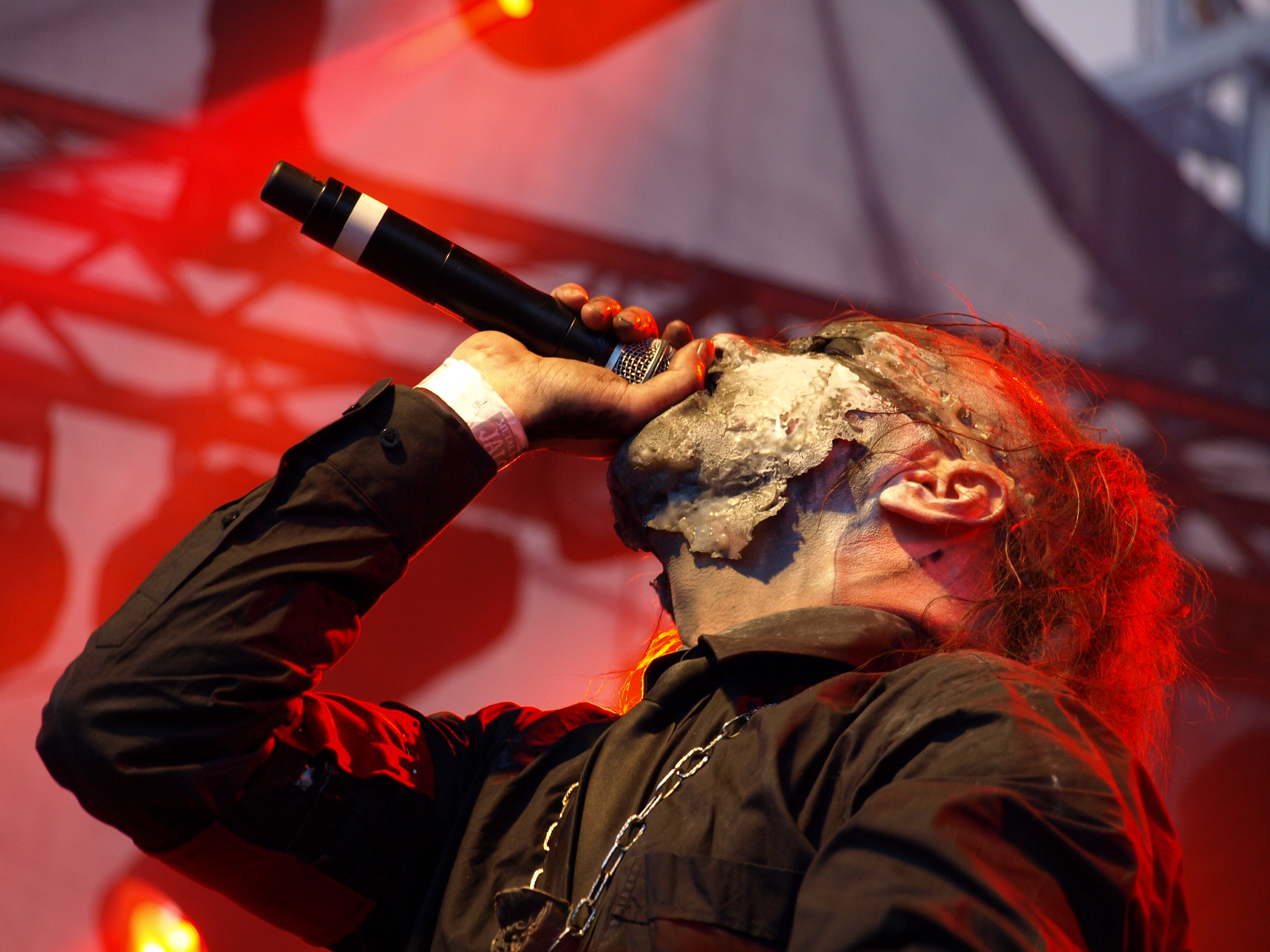
Attila Csihar performing with Mayhem

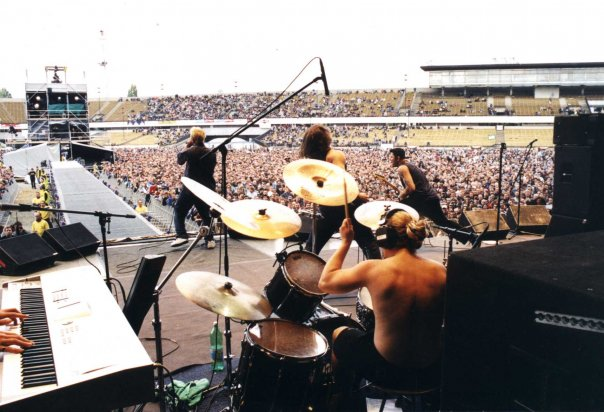
FreshFabrik performing live in Prague, 2001, supporting AC/DC and Rammstein

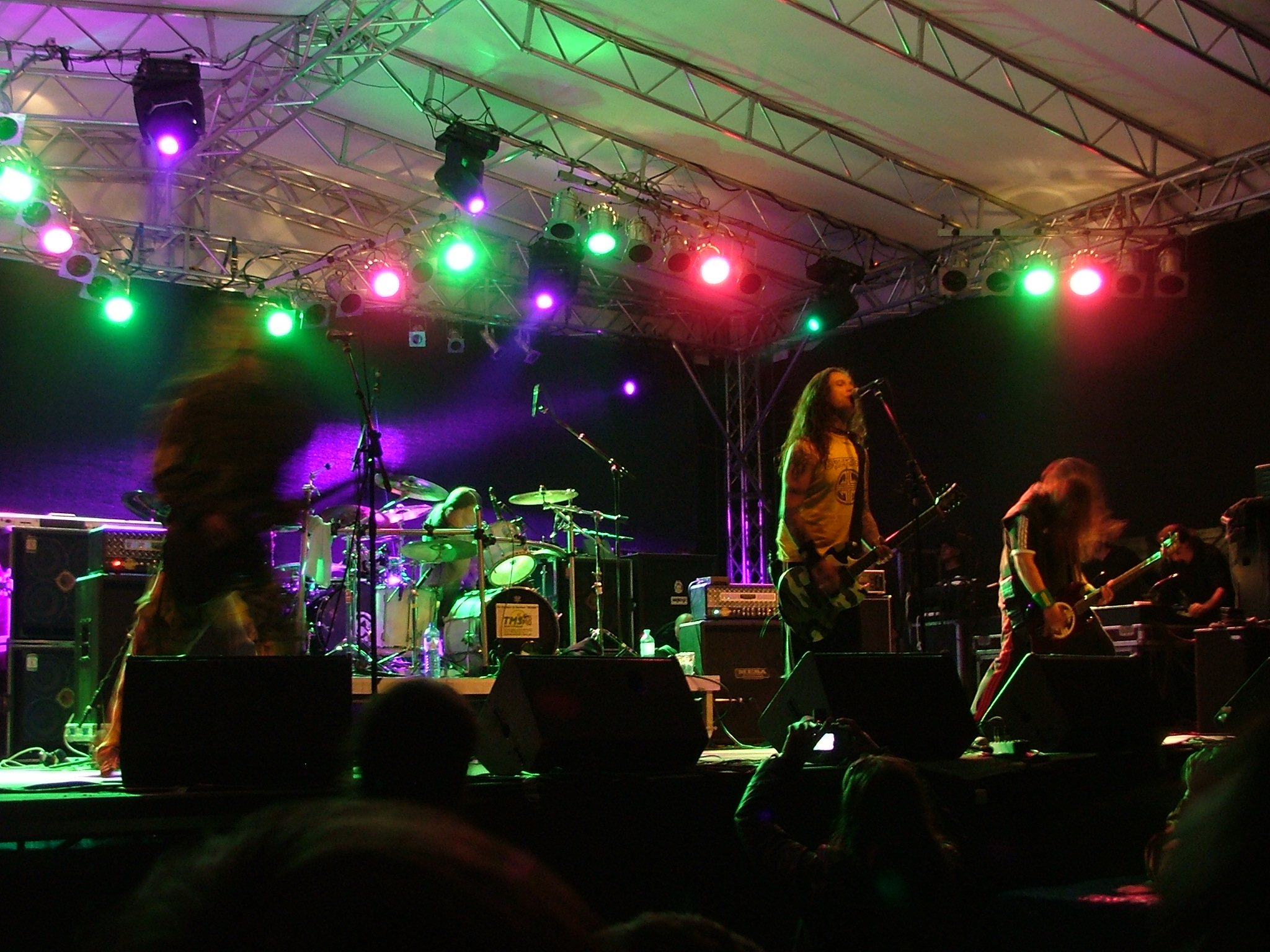
Ektomorf performing at Rock the Lake Festival in 2007

== See also ==
Hungarian rock
