= Alien Vampires =

Italian band

- Origin: Italy
- Genres: Industrial, EBM, Dark Electro
- Years active: 2003–present
- Labels: Alfa Matrix; E-Nox; Kold Finger; BLC Productions
- Members: Nysrok Infernalien; Nightstalker

Alien Vampires is a music group from Italy which performs in the industrial, EBM and dark electro genres and is led by Nysrok Infernalien.

== History ==
The band was founded in 2003 by guitarist and keyboardist Nysrok Infernalien, who also played in Bloodline and Aborym. The project aimed to explore different soundscapes by combining elements of psy trance, industrial, EBM and metal. Nysrok's interest in paranormal phenomena and the supernatural served as a major influence on the band's early direction.

In 2003, synthesist Nemesis joined the group, contributing to its conceptual and compositional development. In 2004, keyboardist and drummer Nightstalker joined Alien Vampires, sharing a passion for the work of Spanish photographer J.A.M. Montoya, as well as for the chemsex and BDSM culture themes that would help to influence and define the overall aesthetic of the band.

In 2004, the Alien Vampires recorded its first musical compositions, which the musicians described as Horror Trance. Shortly afterwards, the project released I’m Dead Fuck You online. In 2005, Alien Vampires signed a contract with the Italian label Kold Finger, which released their debut album Evil Generation (2005) and the 2007 EP Nuns are Pregnant.

In the summer of 2006, the track I Fuck Nuns was released on the compilation New Signs & Sounds, which was included as an audio supplement to the German magazine Zillo. In 2007, the track Evil Generation appeared on the compilation Noise Terror 2 — World Wide Electronics, curated by Johan Van Roy of Suicide Commando. That same year, Alien Vampires signed a contract with the American label BLC Productions to release their second full-length album No One Here Gets Out Alive.

After releasing the first two albums the project gained popularity among fans of extreme electronic music. In 2010, Alien Vampires signed a contract with the Belgian label Alfa Matrix. The first album released on the new label was Harshlizer. The album cover artwork caused controversy when several magazines refused to promote or review the album due to the depiction of nudity and apparent disrespect of religion.

In 2011, the band performed concerts in North America, Australia, and in the UK at Infest 2011.

In 2015, the album Drag You To Hell was released, followed by EPs and remix compilations. Drag You To Hell featured guest appearances by members of Ministry, Mayhem, and Psyclon Nine. The band's next full-length studio album, Return Me To Hell, was released in 2023. Nysrok Infernalien explained the long break by logistical difficulties, as he lives in London and Nightstalker is based in Milan.

== Collaborations ==
The cover of Skinny Puppy's track Assimilate, featured on album Return Me To Hell, marked the last recording of Joey Jordison, the former Slipknot drummer who died in 2021. The cover was recorded in collaboration with Electhrone, Attila Csihar (Mayhem) and Istvan Zilahy (Plasma Pool).

Alien Vampires invited Chainreactor for a jam session on the track Hyperbolic Doubt. Alternative model and cage dancer Dani Devine contributed vocals to 2023 EP Witchy Bitchy.

Alien Vampires have also participated in numerous collaborations with Suicide Commando, In Slaughter Natives, Diabolos, and other bands.

== Discography ==
- 2004 — I'm Dead Fuck You (single)
- 2005 — Evil Generation
- 2007 — Nuns are Pregnant (EP)
- 2007 — No One Here Gets Out Alive
- 2009 — Fuck Off and Die!
- 2010 — Harshlizer
- 2012 — Clubbers Die Younger (EP)
- 2014 — Hard Drugs & BDSM (EP)
- 2015 — Drag You to Hell
- 2017 — Evil Excavation – I’m Dead Fuck You
- 2017 — Evil Degeneration Offspring
- 2018 — Fuck The Revolution Bring On The Apocalypse
- 2018 — Evil Twin
- 2020 — World in Denial (EP)
- 2020 — Destrudo (EP)
- 2023 — Return Me To Hell
