= Firewalk (disambiguation) =

A firewalk is an act of walking barefoot over a bed of hot embers or stones.

Firewalk may also refer to:

- Firewalk (computing), a technique to analyze IP packets
- FIREWALK, a U.S. NSA ANT catalog capabability
- Firewalk Studios, a video game development studio operated by Sony Interactive Entertainment’s PlayStation Studios

== See also ==
- Fire Walk with Us!, an album by Aborym
- Firewalker (disambiguation)
