= Sinsaenum =

Blackened death metal band

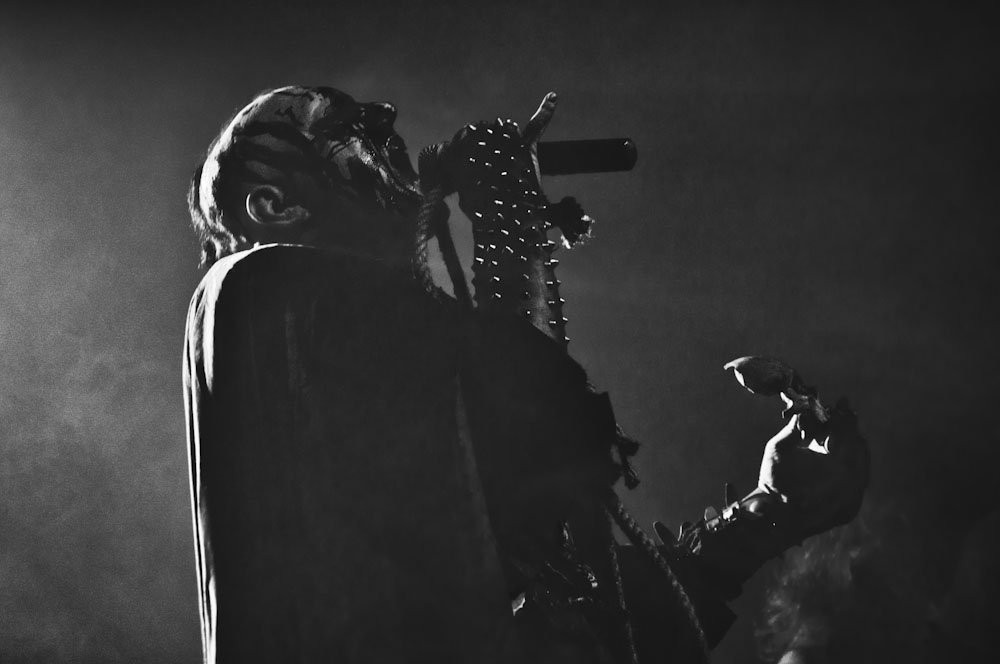
- Vocalist Attila Csihar performing in 2011

Background information
- Origin: France; United States; Hungary
- Genre: Blackened death metal
- Years active: 2016–present
- Labels: earMUSIC; Peccatum
- Members: Sean Zatorsky; Attila Csihar; Stéphane Buriez; Frédéric Leclercq; Heimoth Heimoth; André Joyzi
- Past members: Joey Jordison
- Website: sinsaenum.com

Sinsaenum is a multinational blackened death metal supergroup, formed in 2016. The band features French guitarists Frédéric Leclercq and Stéphane Buriez; vocalists Sean Zatorsky and Attila Csihar, from the United States and Hungary, respectively; French bassist Heimoth; and Portuguese drummer André Joyzi. American drummer Joey Jordison was a member from 2016 to his death in 2022. Sinsaenum released their debut album Echoes of the Tortured in July 2016.

== History ==
The conception of Sinsaenum can be traced as far back as 1998, when Frédéric Leclercq (best known as the longest-serving bassist of English power metal band DragonForce) began writing a number of death metal songs. After recruiting fellow guitarist Stéphane Buriez of Loudblast for the project, Leclercq was contacted by drummer Joey Jordison (known for his work with Slipknot, then a member of Murderdolls, Scar the Martyr and later of VIMIC) with the intention of working together, who later became involved in the project. Jordison proposed the band name Sinsaenum, a modified portmanteau of the words "sin" and "insane". The trio later added Attila Csihar (of Norwegian black metal band Mayhem, also a member of Tormentor, Aborym and Sunn O)))) and Sean Zatorsky of American death/groove metal group Dååth as dual lead vocalists, in addition to Heimoth from French black metal band Seth on the bass to complete the lineup. The formation of the band was officially announced on 20 May 2016.

Sinsaenum released its self-titled debut extended play on 6 June 2016, featuring the exclusive track "Death Is the Beginning" and album track "The Forgotten One". After a music video for the song "Splendor and Agony", the band's debut full-length album Echoes of the Tortured was released by earMUSIC on 29 July 2016. A lyric video was later released for "Anfang des Albtraumes" in August.

In early 2017, the band entered the studio again to begin the process of writing and recording what they dubbed as "Sinsaenum II". It was later announced in summer that year that the band would release a new EP. The EP, entitled Ashes, was scheduled for release on 10 November, featuring new music, previously Japan exclusive bonus tracks, and an alternate mix of the track "Dead Souls" from Echoes of the Tortured, remixed by Frédéric Duquesne of French nu metal group Mass Hysteria. The title track was released with a music video on 29 September 2017. On 27 October, they released the Duquesne mix of "Dead Souls" with a lyric video. Their second album, Repulsion for Humanity, recorded in Sainte-Marthe studio in Paris by Francis Caste, was released in 2018, followed by a European tour. The album differed from the previous work by the presence of groove- and nu metal sound.

In 2021, drummer Joey Jordison passed away. The band released a statement soon after, paying tribute to their former bandmate while revealing that writing for their third album had already begun, with the finished product to be released in tribute to Jordison.

On May 21, 2025, the band revealed that their third album, In Devastation, would be released on August 8. They also released the title track to the album and announced former Breed 77 drummer André Joyzi as the replacement for Joey Jordison.

== Band members ==
Current

- Frédéric Leclercq – rhythm guitar, keyboards, studio bass (2016–present)
- Stéphane Buriez – lead guitar (2016–present)
- Attila Csihar – vocals (2016–present)
- Sean Zatorsky – vocals (2016–present)
- Heimoth (C. Krueger) – bass (2016–present)
- André Joyzi – drums (2025–present)

Former

- Joey Jordison – drums (2016–2021; his death)

== Discography ==
=== Studio albums ===
- Echoes of the Tortured (2016)
- Repulsion for Humanity (2018)
- In Devastation (2025)

=== Extended plays ===
- Sinsaenum (2016)
- A Taste of Sin (2016)
- Ashes (2017)

=== Singles ===
- "Ashes" (2017)
- "Dead Souls" (Frédéric Duquesne Mix) (2017)
- "Final Resolve" (2018)
- "Sacred Martyr" (2018)
- "Nuit Noir" (2018)
- "Hooch" (2018)
- "In Devastation" (2025)

=== Music videos ===
- "Army of Chaos" (2016)
- "Splendor and Agony" (2016)
- "Ashes" (2017)
- "Final Resolve" (2018)
- "Nuit Noire" (2018)
- "Hooch" (2018)
- "In Devastation" (2025)
