= Sirens (Astarte album) =

Studio album by Astarte
- Released: 28 June 2004
- Recorded: August–September 2003 at Praxis Studios (Athens, Greece)
- Genre: Black metal
- Length: 45:42
- Label: Avantgarde
- Producer: Ahti Kortelainen

Astarte chronology
Quod Superius, Sicut Inferius (2002)	Sirens (2004)	Demonized (2007)

Sirens is the fourth album released by the Greek Black metal band Astarte. It was released in 2004.

== Track listing ==
All tracks are written by Tristessa.

No.	Title	Length
1.	"Dark Infected Circles (Outbreak)"	4:40
2.	"Black Mighty Gods"	5:37
3.	"Lloth"	2:38
4.	"Bitterness of Mortality (Mecoman)"	4:52
5.	"Deviate"	4:31
6.	"Oceanus Procellarum (Liquid Tomb)"	6:30
7.	"The Ring (Of Sorrow)"	6:50
8.	"Twist, Nail, Torture"	4:31
9.	"Sirens"	3:57
10.	"Underwater Persephone"	1:31

== Personnel ==
=== Astarte ===
- Tristessa: Vocals, Lead, Acoustic & Bass Guitars
- Hybris: Rhythm Guitars
- Katharsis: Keyboards
- Ivar: Drums, Percussion

=== Additional Personnel ===
- Nicolas S.T.C. Maiis: Vocals on "Bitterness of Mortatlity (Mecoman)"
- Sakis (from Rotting Christ): Vocals on "Oceanus Procellarum (Liquid Tomb)"
- Shagrath (from Dimmu Borgir): Vocals on "The Ring (Of Sorrow)"
