= Plasma Pool =

- Origin: Hungary
- Genres: EBM
- Years active: 1989–present
- Labels: Scarlet, Miscarriage Records

Plasma Pool is an EBM band from Budapest, Hungary that was formed in 1989.

== Current members ==
- Attila Csihar - vocals
- István Zilahy - keyboards
- László Kuli - drums

== Former members ==
- Attila Csihar - vocals (Mayhem, Burial Chamber Trio, Sunn_O))), ex-Aborym, ex-Korog, ex-Keep of Kalessin, ex-Tormentor)

== Discography ==
- I (album, studio and live music, 1996)
- II — Drowning (album, live, 1997)
- III — Sinking (unreleased album)
- The Beast of Attila Csihar (selected tracks on compilation, 2003)
- Ezoterror (album, studio, 2004)
