= Ola Kala (song) =

- Original Greek cover

Single by Sakis

from the album Ola Kala
- B-side: "The Light"
- Released: September 2002
- Recorded: 2001
- Genre: Pop, pop-folk, R&B, dance
- Length: 3:20
- Label: Universal Music France, ULM
- Songwriters: Desmond Child, Phoebus Tassopoulos
- Producer: Desmond Child

Sakis singles chronology
"Disco Girl" (2001)	"Ola Kala" (2002)	"Mia Zoi Mazi" (2002)

Alternative covers
- European cover

"Ola Kala" (Greek: "Όλα Καλά"; English: Everything is fine) is the second single released by Greek singer Sakis Rouvas from his eighth studio album of the same name in September 2002. The single was also released initially in France and in many other parts of Europe by 2004. It served as his second internationally released single. While it topped the Greek Airplay charts, it did not chart on the French charts. It was released in both Greek and English versions. The song received generally favourable reviews from Greek music critics.

The music video of the song was directed by French director Xavier Gens in Montreal, Quebec, Canada and features the "Stereodrome Remix" of the song. Its cinematography features slow motion and back travel scenes. Rouvas has performed the song at the first Arion Music Awards and on all of his subsequent tours.

== Background ==
"Ola Kala" was written by American songwriter and record producer Desmond Child, who also produced Rouvas' entire album of the same name, and by Greek songwriter Phoebus. The song is produced by Child. The Greek lyrics are by Phoebus while its English counterpart is by Swedish songwriter Andreas Carlsson. In Greece the song was released as a maxi single containing the English versions Ola Kala's three singles, which were also available on the reissue of the album after its release in the foreign market that summer; thus it was meant for listeners who had already purchased the original edition of the album without the English versions in April 2002. The international release of the single featured only that track, in its Greek and English versions as well as remixes. The remixes of "Ola Kala" were also featured on Rouvas' remix album the following year.

== Critical reception ==
Critical reaction from Greek critics was mostly positive. An unidentified Music Corner reviewer suggested that many would be curious as to how Rouvas sings in English, adding that "we must admit that [Rouvas] has the capabilities of [establishing a career abroad]." He further noted of the maxi single "[n]ot bad...! Not bad...!", indicating his belief that it had potential to be successful abroad. In a flashback review of the artists work, Thomai Karathanou of Tralala reviewed the song positively for its positive message, saying "he [gave] us courage."

== Music video ==
The music video of the song was directed by French director Xavier Gens of the production company Bullring, who would also go on to direct the music video of "Feelings"/"Dis Lui"/"Pes Tis". It features the "Stereodrome Remix" of the song. The video was filmed in Montreal, Quebec, Canada. In the beginning, sirens are heard. There are two street signs exhibiting the intersection of Ola Kala street and Sakis Avenue. A fire hydrant is spraying water onto the street as Rouvas and other people walk by. The music then begins and the video cuts to a scene with hip-hop dancers performing in a dark warehouse, striking poses and then Rouvas appears performing the choreography as well. The video then continuously alternates between the dance sequence to the occurrences on the street. On the street, Rouvas accidentally nudges a woman as she walks by and they engage in a long stare as they walk in opposite directions. Rouvas then begins to follow her, doing so through the street and a farmer's market; she is aware of this and begins flirting with him from a distance. While the two of them are shown moving forward, the rest of the occurrences proceed in a backward slow motion, such as birds and people flying and walking backwards, and fruit at the farmer's market that had been dropped going back into the bin. The warehouse where Rouvas and the dancers are performing is then revealed to be a concert stage, as the camera zooms out, revealing an audience, lighting, and the name Sakis decorated with pyrotechnics. In front of the name, people continue to advance backwards, but Rouvas and his love interest are pulled forward towards each other and engage in a kiss. They are then revealed to be onstage, although the venue is now empty. They leave together as Rouvas shuts the stage lights off, with the scene fading to black.

The making of the video was featured in the DVD of Rouvas' Remixes album.

== Cover versions and samples ==
- Serbian singer Tijana Dapčević covered the song in the Serbian language called "Ona to zna" ("She Knows That").
- American pop singer Britney Spears sampled "Ola Kala" in her song "The Hook Up" from her fourth studio album, In the Zone (2003). Spears' song has several similarities to that of Rouvas'. In an interview with Tatiana Stefanidou, Ilias Psinakis, Rouvas' manager at the time, stated that they sent a demo of the song to Spears' producers who decided to keep it, although the sample is not credited.
- There is also a Bulgarian cover performed by Desi Slava and Ruslan Mainov "Samo edna"

== Track listing ==
- Greek maxi single
1. "Ola Kala" (English Version)– 3:20
2. "Disco Girl" (English Version) – 3:54
3. "The Light" (Mia Zoi Mazi) – 4:20
- European single (#724386149824)
1. "Ola Kala" (English Version) – 3:20
2. "Ola Kala" (Greek Version) – 3:20
3. "Ola Kala" (Stereodrome Remix) – 3:14
4. "Ola Kala" (Marsheaux Remix) – 4:25
5. "Ola Kala" (feat. G. Kasmir Oriental Mix) – 5:05

== Personnel ==
- Sakis Rouvas – vocals
- Andreas Carlsson – songwriter
- Desmond Child – songwriter, producer, executive producer
- Phoebus – songwriter
- Paul Santo- guitar

== Release history ==
Region	Date	Label
Cyprus	September 2002	EMI/Minos
Greece	September 2002	EMI/Minos
France	September 2002	Universal Music/ULM
Germany	2004	EMI/Capitol
