= A Quatrain for the Damned =

Studio album by Shadows Dance
- Released: 2003
- Genre: Gothic metal
- Length: 37:55
- Label: Ebony Tears

Shadows Dance chronology
Shadows Dance (demo) (1999)	A Quatrain for the Damned (2003)

A Quatrain for the Damned is the only album by the Greek gothic metal band Shadows Dance. It was released in 2003 by Dutch label Ebony Tears.

The record featured three full members of the metal band, alongside numerous female guest vocalists, string players and a choir. The guests were from Astarte, among others.

== Reception ==
Norway's Scream Magazine scored the album a decent 4 out of 6. The gothic metal with death and black tinges worked well, but the reviewer wanted even more death-style vocals and less of the "worst plastic synths".

Rock Hard placed themselves lower, giving 6 out of 10 points, followed by Finnish site Desibeli.net that gave 2.5 stars out of 5. The reviewer found the "melody-rich, cathedral-like symphonic gothic/doom metal" to contain tendencies towards "intricately imaginative" arrangements. However, the arrangements fell flat, and there was an overuse of strings and keyboards, with the album seeing a "gradual decline" as it progressed. Had a number of songs been cut, Shadows Dance could have presented a "rock-solid mini-release".

Another Finnish publication Imperiumi was more positive, giving an 8 minus. The music was catchy and succeeded "quite well in building atmosphere", though there was a slight overabundance of "conventional stylistic choices". Metal Storm was just below, giving 7.9 points. Metal.de gave a 7, citing competent compositions and well-executed vocal arrangements. On the weaker side, the production "suffers from a few minor flaws", though the "raw, unrefined edge" was also a strength.

== Track listing ==
1. "Licking the Limbs of Abyss" – 6:14
2. "Last Kiss" – 6:04
3. "Until the Young Whore Sings" – 5:48
4. "Dance in the Storms" – 5:55
5. "Swathe Me into Illusions" – 4:52
6. "My Christ Was Dark" – 4:38
7. "Her Cruel Masque" – 4:24
