= Superbutt =

Hungarian band

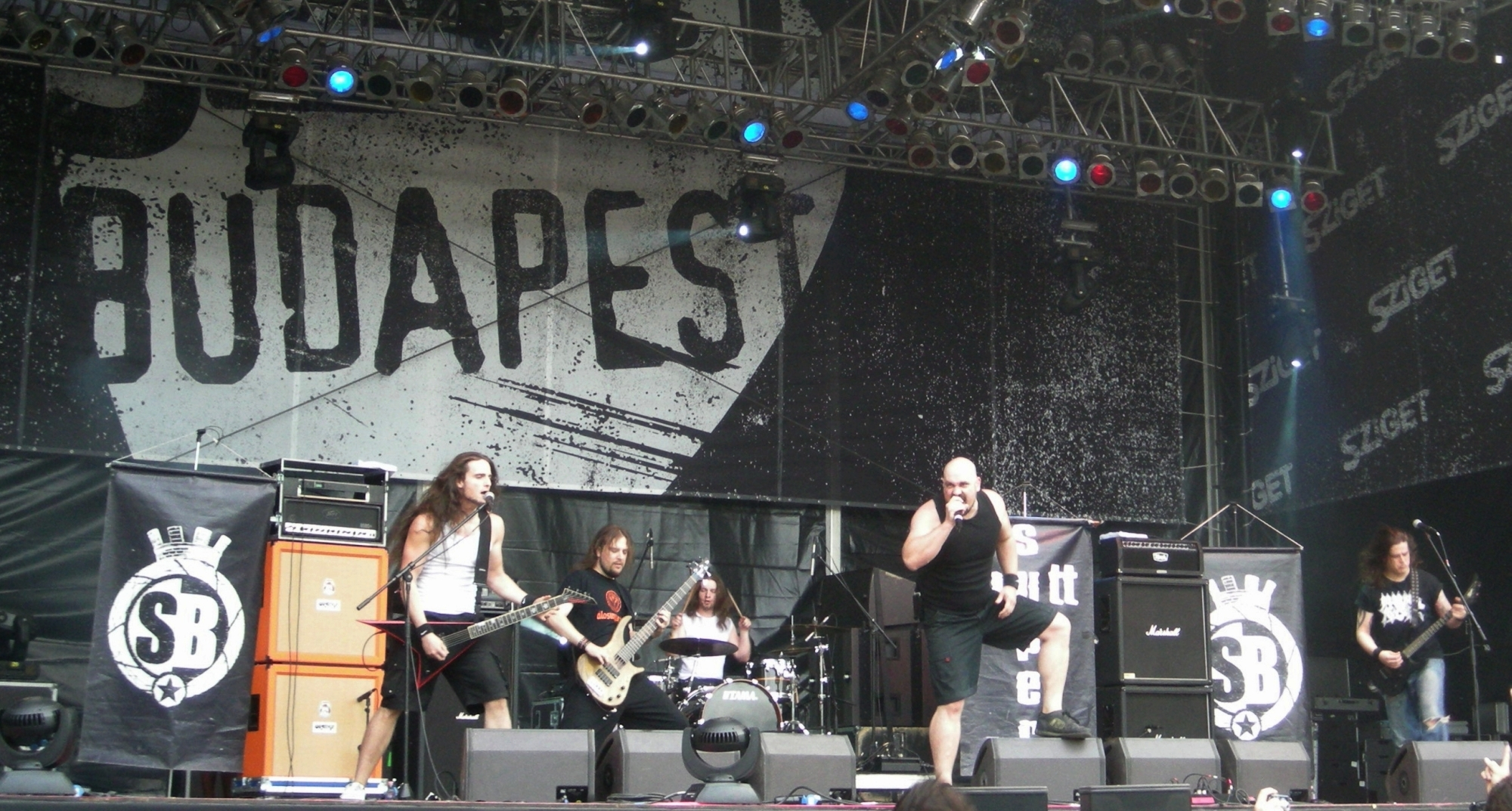
- Superbutt performing at Sziget Festival in 2011.

Background information
- Origin: Hungary
- Genres: Nu metal
- Years active: 2000 – present
- Labels: Sonic Attack Records, Edge Records
- Members: András Vörös; Attila Kovács; György Nedoluha; Attila Erdei
- Past members: Béla Gábor; Lajos Szöllősi; Zsolt Szentpéteri; Salim Mahboubi; Szabolcs Szűcs; Péter Szűcs; Zoltán Prepelicza; László Makai; Ádám Fellegi; Tamás Práznek
- Website: www.superbutt.net

Superbutt is a Hungarian rock and heavy metal band. The Budapest-based act started up in 2000, and has released five full-length albums in English, as well as a 4 track EP and a bonus disc for their latest album with 4 new songs in Hungarian. Superbutt has toured all across Europe since 2001 and played over 600 concerts in 15 countries.

== Biography ==
=== The early years (2000–2002) ===
Singer András Vörös formed Superbutt in 2000, after he left his former act FreshFabrik. The band was named after the keyboard player/composer Gergely Buttinger, who – although he did not become a member – handed over his demo material on a no brand cassette tape that only said "Super" and his name on the label. The players in the first line up were drummer Béla Gábor, guitarists Zsolt Szentpéteri and Lajos Szöllősi (later replaced by Szabolcs Szűcs) and bassist Salim Mahboubi. In 2001 the group signed to Magneoton/Warner records and released their first album entitled 2 Minutes For Roughing. They started touring outside Hungary, in Bulgaria, Austria and Germany. In the same year the album was released in Bulgaria in a cassette tape format by the local Warner licensee. In 2002 the band toured with the Californian hardcore/punk band Ignite (Italy, Austria, Hungary) and they played their first headliner shows in the Benelux countries.

=== The first wave (2003–2008) ===
In 2003 the band recorded their second studio album The Unbeatable Eleven, with songs, such as Pioneer, Fishmachine, Joe De Miro's Concrete Shoes or Eat My Brains, that later became trademarks of Superbutt. After the Hungarian release, the album came out in France (on Dirty8 Records) as well as in Germany, Austria and Switzerland (Incubator Records). The music video of Pioneer became very successful; it peaked at No. 6 on the top 10 of Hungarian VIVA TV's chart and also reached VIVA TV's alternative top 20 in Germany. The number of live concerts started to increase rapidly: beside the countless headliner club gigs Superbutt toured with well-known bands like Pro-Pain in Germany and Clawfinger in France, and started appearing at more and more festivals as well. In 2005 the band played the main stage of With Full Force, one of Germany's biggest rock festivals. In 2006 Black Soup, their third studio album was released by Magneoton/Warner in Hungary, Dirty 8 in France and Tiefdruck Musik Records in the rest of Europe. The album stayed in the top 20 of DAT20 German Alternative Charts for 8 weeks, and the music video of the song Better Machine (a paraphrase of the very popular TV series 24), became Superbutt's second most successful hit after Pioneer. This year brought the first line-up change too: drummer Béla Gábor was replaced by Péter Szűcs. The most important project of 2007 was Szájon át, the band's first material with Hungarian lyrics. The title song of the 4 track EP became the most successful music video of Superbutt on YouTube so far, and the response of the audience was also very good to A hetedik – a cover version of the poem by the famous Hungarian author Attila József (1905-1937) with music originally written by Hobo Blues Band in 1981. As one of the highlights of their career, Superbutt headlined their self-organized mini festival at Petőfi Csarnok in Budapest at the end of the year, selling almost 1000 tickets (972 to be precise) to the show. The concert was filmed and recorded entirely and later a music video was edited from the material to the song A hetedik. Outside Hungary they reached nearly every corner of Europe in this period, they played in Russia, France, Netherlands, Romania, Italy and Germany. In 2008 the band recorded the album You and Your Revolution with producer Jocke Skog at Fear And Loathing studios in Stockholm. The album, which in retrospect can be regarded as the conclusion of the band's first classic era won the Best studio production and Best album cover categories at the Hang-súly Hungarian Metal Awards. You and Your Revolution was released by Edge records in Hungary and by Tiefdruck Musik in Germany, France, UK and the Benelux countries. The music videos of the album were the monodrama short film by András Jeli for Figure, the video clip for Last Call featuring Clawfinger's singer Zak Tell and a live video for Gone Far.

=== The transition years (2009–2010) ===
Shortly after the release of the album You and Your Revolution, the line-up of the band changed fundamentally. This marked the end of the band's first era. Salim Mahboubi and Zsolt Szentpéteri quit due to family reasons, while Szabolcs Szűcs had to give up touring actively because of his civil job as a sound engineer and producer. After three chaotic months while Superbutt did a Hungarian headliner tour and a few support gigs with In Flames in Eastern Europe with some of the old members and ever changing substitute players, the new line-up shaped up by the summer of 2009, with Attila Kovács (former member of Watch My Dying and Sear Bliss) and Tamás Práznek (former technician of Superbutt) on guitars, Zoltán Prepelicza (Remembering The Steel – Pantera Tribute; Apey & the Pea) on bass and initially Péter Szűcs, then László Makai (Zoltán Prepelicza's bandmate in Remembering The Steel – Pantera Tribute and Apey & The Pea) on drums. The most important events of this era were the Red Bull Music Clash contest at the EFOTT festival (Baja, Hungary) in July 2009 where Superbutt had to play a very special set collaborating with the indie-alternative act The Moog with cover versions and playing each other's songs as well (out of which some were later recorded and released on the bonus disc of Music For Animals album); and the Red Bull Mixtour (6 shows in Hungary) with a set created especially for the tour collaborating with the Hungarian hip hop group Hősök, the ska band PASO and the folk-electro act Folkfree. At the end of 2010 Zoltán Prepelicza and László Makai returned to their original bands and Superbutt stepped into the second decade of their history heading towards new directions.

=== The Music For Animals era (2011 - …) ===
The band signed to the Berlin-based label Sonic Attack in early 2011, and started working on a new album. The main songwriter was Attila Kovács in cooperation with Ádám Fellegi, the ex-drummer of Newborn and ex-guitar player of Bridge To Solace, Hungary's two top hardcore acts of the first decade of the 2000s. Ádám joined forces with Superbutt to write and record the new album, and his ideas combined with Attila's musical world changed the direction of Superbutt within the metal genre quite significantly. The new album entitled Music For Animals, partly recorded and mixed in Berlin by producer Mirco ‘Godi’ Hildmann was released on September 30, 2011 and the European music press voted it the best album of Superbutt almost unanimously. So far three music videos (Pont középre, Best Plays and the Neil Young cover Rockin In The Free World serving as the video diary of the show played at Sziget festival in Budapest in August 2012) were made for Music For Animals. At the end of the year 2012 the band is about to release a video game (Cleaver) thus being the first rock band in the world using such a computer application as an interactive music video, and a live DVD of the show played at the venue A38 in March 2012 is in preparation as well. Regarding the current line-up: the Kovács-Vörös-Fellegi-Práznek album recording formation was completed with bassist György Nedoluha, and drummer Attila Erdei in May 2011. A year later guitarist Tamás Práznek had to leave the band due to health issues and these days Superbutt keeps working as a 4-piece combo.

== Discography ==
- 2 Minutes For Roughing, full-length album, 2001 (Warner Music Hungary)
- The Unbeatable Eleven, full-length album, 2003 (Warner Music Hungary)
- Black Soup, full-length album, 2006 (mTon)
- Szájon át, 4 track EP, 2007 (in Hungarian language) (mTon)
- You and Your Revolution, full-length album, 2008 (Edge)
- Music For Animals, full-length album, 2011 (Sonic Attack)
- Music For Animals, double album, limited edition, 2011 (Edge)

== Official Video Clips ==
- Lust Kills (2 Minutes For Roughing album), 2001 - directed by Martin Szecsanov
- Losing My Way (2 Minutes For Roughing album), 2002 - 3D animation directed by Demeter Lóránt
- Pioneer (The Unbeatable Eleven album), 2003 - directed by Martin Szecsanov
- Bonestar (The Unbeatable Eleven album), 2004 - directed by Sára Cserhalmi and Dávid Lukács
- Better Machine (Black Soup album), 2006 - directed by Martin Szecsanov
- Szájon át (Szájon át EP), 2007 - directed by Joselito Duric
- A hetedik (live), 2007 - live footage from Petőfi Csarnok, Budapest on Dec 28th, 2007, edited by Tamás Reich
- Figure (You And Your Revolution album), 2009 - directed by András Jeli
- Last Call (You And Your Revolution album), 2009 - directed by Nil Szabó
- Gone Far (You And Your Revolution album), 2010 - live footage, edited by Alt/Art Studio
- Pont Középre (Music For Animals), 2011 - directed by András Jeli
- Best Plays (Music For Animals), 2012 - directed by Yvonne Kerékgyártó
- Rockin' In The Free World (a video diary of Sziget 2012) (Music For Animals), 2012 - live footage from Sziget festival 2012, main camera by Dávid Sajó, edited by Zsófia Ördög

== Awards and chart positions ==
- Best modern rock band of the year – VIVA TV Award, 2003
- Pioneer in the top 10 of VIVA TV's charts for 5 weeks (peaking at 6th position), 2003
- Better Machine in the top 10 of VIVA TV's charts for 6 weeks (peaking at 3rd position), 2006
- Black Soup album in the top 20 of DAT20 Alternative Charts in Germany for 8 weeks (peaking at 11th position), 2006
- Best studio production and best album cover (You And Your Revolution) - Hang-súly Hungarian Metal Awards, 2009

== Band members ==
- András Vörös - vocals (2000–present)
- Attila Kovács - guitar (2009–present)
- György Nedoluha - bass (2011–present)
- Attila Erdei - drums (2011–present)

=== Additional touring and recording members ===
- Csaba Schleier - drums (substitute for Béla Gábor on tour dates with Pro-Pain in 2005)
- Péter Nagy-Miklós - guitar (substitute for Zsolt Szentpéteri on some tour dates in 2005, 2006 and 2007)
- Gábor Barczi - bass (substitute for Salim Mahboubi on some tour dates in 2007)
- Péter Lipák - guitar (substitute for Attila Kovács on some tour dates in 2009-2010)
- Ádám Fellegi - drums, backing vocals (composing and recording on Music For Animals, 2011)

=== Former members ===
- Béla Gábor - drums (2000–2006)
- Lajos Szöllősi - guitar (2000–2001)
- Szabolcs Szűcs - guitar (2001–2008)
- Salim Mahboubi - bass (2000–2009)
- Zsolt Szentpéteri - guitar (2000–2009)
- Péter Szűcs - drums (2006–2010)
- Zoltán Prepelicza - bass (2009–2010)
- László Makai - drums (2010)
- Tamás Práznek - guitar (2008–2012)
