= Generator (Aborym album) =

Studio album by Aborym
- Released: 21 February 2006
- Genre: Industrial black metal
- Length: 44:20
- Label: Season Of Mist
- Producer: Christian Ice, M. Fabban and Nysrok

Aborym chronology
With No Human Intervention (2003)	Generator (2006)	Psychogrotesque (2010)

Generator is the fourth studio album by the Italian industrial black metal band Aborym. Former vocalist Attila Csihar makes a guest appearance on this album, performing vocals on "Man Bites God". Vocals on the rest of the album are performed by Prime Evil.

This is Aborym's first album to feature a human drummer as opposed to a drum machine. It is also the last to feature longtime guitarist Nysrok Infernalien.

== Track listing ==
No.	Title	Length
1.	"Armageddon (Intro)"	1:12
2.	"Disgust and Rage (Sic Transit Gloria Mundi)"	5:53
3.	"A Dog-Eat-Dog World"	5:09
4.	"Ruinrama Kolossal S.P.Q.R. (Satanic Pollution — Qliphotic Rage)"	6:24
5.	"Generator"	5:45
6.	"Suffer Catalyst"	5:23
7.	"Between the Devil and the Deep Blue Sea"	4:08
8.	"Man Bites God"	7:12
9.	"I Reject!"	3:14
Total length:		44:20

== Credits ==
- Malfeitor Fabban - bass, synth
- Prime Evil - vocals
- Nysrok Infernalien - guitar, synth
- Faust - drums

Special Guests

- Attila Csihar - vocals on "Man Bites God"
- Richard K. Szabo
- Cultoculus - Backing Vocals
- Jiehna Ycosahateron - Noise Addiction
