= Disco Girl =

- Original Greek cover

Single by Sakis Rouvas

from the album Ola Kala
- Released: 17 December 2001
- Recorded: 2001
- Genre: Dance-pop, pop, club
- Length: 3:54
- Label: EMI/Minos
- Songwriters: Desmond Child, Phoebus
- Producer: Desmond Child

Sakis Rouvas singles chronology
"Theleis I Den Theleis" (1998)	"Disco Girl" (2001)	"Ola Kala" (2002)

Alternative covers
- French cover

Alternative cover
- Promotional cover

"Disco Girl" is a song released by Greek singer Sakis Rouvas on 17 December 2001 by Minos EMI. It was released as a two track CD single with the original song and a remix, both of which were produced by Desmond Child and Phoebus.

The original Greek CD single includes bonus content along with the two versions of the song. When the CD is played on a computer, it features videos, photographs and information on Rouvas's career to date. The bonus content also features clips from the making of the four different "Disco Girl" covers in the Dominican Republic and an exclusive interview with the single's producer, Desmond Child, speaking about the production of Ola Kala and his impressions on the popular Greek musician and their collaboration.

The song was released in France by Universal Music on 17 June 2002 with an English version with lyrics by Andreas Carlsson.

== Music video ==
The music video of the song was directed by French directors Antonin Bonnet and Tanguy Dairaine of the production company Happy Design and was filmed in Cape Town, South Africa. At the start of the video, Rouvas is water skiing and splashes a young woman on the beach with water when he passes. The video then moves to a bar scene before Rouvas jumps from the highest diving board of a pool, and impresses the woman. Scenes of the two spending time together are seen next. When the woman falls asleep, Rouvas steals a large diamond from her safe causing a brief police chase which he escapes from. The video ends with Rouvas joining three women on a speedboat and dropping the diamond into the ocean.

== Track listing ==
- Greek CD single
1. "Disco Girl" – (3:54)
2. "Disco Girl" (Remix by Mark Olivier) – (6:49)
- Promotional CD
1. "Disco Girl" (Radio Edit) – (3:54)
2. "Disco Girl" (Club Mix) – (6:48)
3. "Disco Girl" (Club Mix) – (3:38)
4. "Disco Girl" (Mom Remix) – (8:11)
- French CD single
1. "Disco Girl" (Greek Version) – (3:54)
2. "Disco Girl" (English Version) – (3:54)

== Charts and certifications ==
"Disco Girl" received that platinum certification in Greece before the single was even released, selling over 20,000 copies. The award was officially presented to Rouvas on 26 January 2002 during a certification party held at NJV-Athens Plaza in Syntagma Square.

The song debuted on the Greek Singles Chart at number three during the week of 24 December 2001 before moving and peaking at number one the next week. After a one-week slide back to number three, the song returned to number one for its second and final week in the position. The song left the chart in the middle of 2002 after 18 weeks on the chart. It returned to the singles chart in September 2005 for one week at number 19 leading to a total of 19 weeks on the chart.

Shortly after the song's French release, it entered the French Singles Chart on 22 June 2002 and peaked at number 79, charting for seven consecutive weeks.

Chart	Peak position	Weeks	Certification
Greek Singles Chart	1	19	Platinum
French Singles Chart	79	7	–

== Awards ==
=== Arion Music Awards ===
- 2002: Best Male Pop Singer

== Release history ==
Region	Date	Label
Greece	17 December 2001	EMI/Minos
Cyprus	17 December 2001	EMI/Minos
France	17 June 2002	ULM
