= Echoes of the Tortured =

Studio album by Sinsaenum
- Released: July 29, 2016
- Recorded: 2016
- Genre: Blackened death metal
- Length: 61:36
- Label: earMUSIC
- Producer: Jens Bogren

Sinsaenum chronology
Sinsaenum (2016)	Echoes of the Tortured (2016)	Repulsion for Humanity (2018)

Singles from Echoes of the Tortured
- 1. "Splendor and Agony" Released: July 12, 2016

Professional ratings
Review scores
Source	Rating
Blabbermouth.net	8/10 stars
Bravewords.com	9/10 stars
Metal Injection	8/10 stars

Echoes of the Tortured is the debut album by metal supergroup Sinsaenum. It was released on July 29, 2016.

== Background ==
Guitarist Frédéric Leclercq, who composed all music on the album and co-wrote all lyrics, had some death metal demos but his commitments to DragonForce prevented them seeing the light of day. However, he eventually showed the demos to Loudblast frontman Stéphane Buriez who, along with ex-Slipknot and Murderdolls drummer Joey Jordison, founded the band. They recruited Sean Zatorsky of Dååth and Attila Csihar of Mayhem as dual lead vocalists and finally Heimoth of Seth on bass. They released their debut single and video for "Splendor and Agony" on July 12, 2016. They announced the release date as July 29, 2016, and released a two-song EP for streaming on June 6. Jordison described the music in an interview as "fucking powerful".

== Track listing ==
All lyrics are written by Frédéric Leclercq and Sean Zatorsky except where noted; all music is composed by Leclercq.

No.	Title	Lyrics	Length
1.	"Materialization" (instrumental)		1:19
2.	"Splendor and Agony"		3:45
3.	"Excommunicate" (instrumental)		0:45
4.	"Inverted Cross"		3:35
5.	"March"		0:43
6.	"Army of Chaos"	Leclercq, Attila Csihar, Zatorsky	5:18
7.	"Redemption" (instrumental)		0:44
8.	"Dead Souls"		4:20
9.	"Lullaby" (instrumental)		1:45
10.	"Final Curse"		4:30
11.	"Condemned to Suffer"		5:10
12.	"Ritual"		1:13
13.	"Sacrifice"	Stéphane Buriez, Leclercq	3:45
14.	"Damnation" (instrumental)		0:46
15.	"The Forgotten One"		4:35
16.	"Torment" (instrumental)		0:50
17.	"Anfang des Albtraumes"	Zatorsky, Csihar, Leclercq	5:50
18.	"Mist" (instrumental)		0:47
19.	"Echoes of the Tortured"	Leclercq	4:53
20.	"Emptiness" (instrumental)		2:20
21.	"Gods of Hell"	Leclercq	4:43
Total length:			61:36

Deluxe Edition bonus tracks
No.	Title	Length
22.	"Oblivion" (instrumental)	0:53
23.	"Death Is the Beginning"	4:27
Total length:		66:56

Japan Edition bonus tracks
No.	Title	Lyrics	Length
22.	"Degeneration"
23.	"King of the Desperate Lands"	Leclercq, Buriez, Zatorsky

== Personnel ==
Sinsaenum

- Sean Zatorsky – lead vocals
- Attila Csihar – lead vocals
- Frédéric Leclercq – guitars, bass, synthesizers
- Stéphane Buriez – guitars
- Heimoth – bass
- Joey Jordison – drums

Additional personnel

- Marcel Schirmer – vocals on "Army of Chaos"
- Mika Kawashima – vocals on "March" and "Army of Chaos"
- Mirai Kawashima – vocals on "March" and "Army of Chaos"

Production

- Jen Borgen – mixing, mastering
- Linus Corneliusson – mixing assistance
- Tony Lindgren – mastering assistance
- Frédéric Leclercq – production
- Sinsaenum – production
- Costin Chioreanu – cover artwork
- Damnation Creations – logo, booklet concept, design
- Itsván Bielik – photography

== Charts ==
Chart (2016)	Peak position
Belgian Albums (Ultratop Flanders)	86
Belgian Albums (Ultratop Wallonia)	61
French Albums (SNEP)	127
