= Psychogrotesque =

Studio album by Aborym
- Released: 8 November 2010
- Studio: Fear No One Studio
- Genre: Industrial black metal, avant-garde metal
- Length: 52:46
- Label: Season Of Mist
- Producer: Malfeitor Fabban

Aborym chronology
Generator (2006)	Psychogrotesque (2010)	Dirty (2013)

Psychogrotesque is the fifth studio album by the Italian industrial black metal band Aborym.

The album was recorded, mixed and mastered at Fear No One Studios by Emiliano Natali, with the sound consulting of Marc Urselli (founder of The M.E.M.O.R.Y. Lab and sound engineer for artists like John Zorn, Laurie Anderson, Lou Reed, Eric Clapton) at the Eastside Sound Studios in New York.

== Track listing ==
No.	Title	Length
1.	"I"	1:56
2.	"II"	5:03
3.	"III"	4:05
4.	"IV"	4:36
5.	"V"	5:40
6.	"VI"	6:14
7.	"VII"	5:12
8.	"VIII"	2:30
9.	"IX"	2:48
10.	"X"	8:43
11.	"X (Hidden Track)"	2:09
Total length:		52:46

== Personnel ==
=== Aborym ===
- Malfeitor Fabban - Vocals, Bass, Keyboards
- Hell:I0:Kabbalus - Guitars, Keyboards
- Bård G. "Faust" Eithun - Drums

Additional

- Karyn Crisis - Additional Vocals (3, 6, 10) [Crisis, Gawk]
- Davide Tiso - Additional Guitars (2 intro, 9, 10 outro) [ Ephel Duath, Parched ]
- Richard K. Szabo - Additional Electronics (9) [T.W.Z.]
- Marc "M.E.M.O.R.Y. Lab" Urselli - Additional Music (3), Beat Production (3) [The M.E.M.O.R.Y. Lab]
- Giulio Moschini - Guitar Solo (10) [Hour Of Penance]
- Pete Michael Kolstad Vegem - Guitar Solo (10) [ Blood Tsunami ]
- Emiliano Natali - Guitar Solo (2L), Additional Bass, Falsettos
- Narchost - Additional Industrial Samples (5)
- Marcello Balena - Saxophone (5, 6)
