= The Pagan Winter =

Demo album by Sear Bliss
- Released: May 1995
- Recorded: April 10–12, 1995; LMS Studio; Szombathely, Hungary
- Genre: Black metal
- Length: 21:11 (original); 33:15 (1997 re-release)
- Label: Mascot/Two Moons (re-release 1997)
- Producer: Bertalan Domby

Sear Bliss chronology
The Pagan Winter (1995)	Phantoms (1996)

The Pagan Winter is the first studio recording by Hungarian symphonic black metal band Sear Bliss. In that time founder/bass player András Nagy was only 17 years old. Thanks to this demo Mascot Records from the Netherlands offered a three-album contract and signed the band.

Mascot Records re-released The Pagan Winter on CD in 1997 following the success of Sear Bliss' debut album Phantoms.

== Track listing ==
1995 demo

Side A

1. "Ancient" – 4:54
2. "The Pagan Winter" – 4:33

Side B

1. "…Where the Darkness Always Reigned" – 7:20
2. "Twilight" – 4:24

1997 re-release

1. "Ancient" – 4:54
2. "Twilight" – 4:24
3. "…Where the Darkness Always Reigned" – 7:20
4. "The Pagan Winter" – 4:34
5. "In the Shadow of Another World" (re-release bonus track) – 12:02

== Credits ==
- Zoltán Csejtei – vocals
- Csaba Csejtei – guitar
- János Barbarics – guitar
- Winter – synthesizer, lyrics
- András Nagy – bass
- Gergely Szűcs – trumpet
- Balázs Bertalan – drums (session fill-in)
- Zoltán Máté – guest vocals on "Twilight"

== Re-release ==
The original track list was extended by a 12-minute song called "In the Shadow of Another World" recorded between November 7–11, 1996 in Nautilus Studio, Sopron, Hungary. Kris Verwimp created the new artwork for the re-release.

Sear Bliss "In the Shadow of Another World" recording line-up:

- András Nagy – bass, vocals
- János Barbarics – guitar
- Csaba Csejtei – guitar
- Zoltán Csejtei – drums
- Winter – synthesizer
- Gergely Szűcs – trumpet
