= Dirty (Aborym album) =

Studio album by Aborym
- Released: 28 May 2013
- Recorded: Fear No One Studio
- Genre: Industrial black metal
- Length: 1:27:42
- Label: Agonia Records
- Producer: Fabban and Paolo Pieri

Aborym chronology
Psychogrotesque (2010)	Dirty (2013)	Shifting.Negative (2017)

Dirty is the sixth studio album by the Italian industrial black metal band Aborym, released on 28 May 2013 through Agonia Records. It is a double album, with the second disc containing re-worked versions of older tracks and covers.

== Track listing ==
=== Disc 1 ===
No.	Title	Length
1.	"Irreversible Crisis"	4:23
2.	"Across the Universe"	5:28
3.	"Dirty"	3:42
4.	"Bleedthrough"	3:24
5.	"Raped by Daddy"	5:29
6.	"I Don't Know"	4:32
7.	"The Factory of Death"	7:07
8.	"Helter Skelter Youth"	4:14
9.	"Face the Reptile"	5:32
10.	"The Day the Sun Stopped Shining"	5:23
Total length:		49:14

=== Disc 2 ===
No.	Title	Length
1.	"Fire Walk with Us (New Version)"	6:48
2.	"Roma Divina Urbs (New Version)"	8:50
3.	"Hallowed Be Thy Name (Iron Maiden cover)"	6:03
4.	"Comfortably Numb (Pink Floyd cover)"	6:32
5.	"Hurt (Nine Inch Nails cover)"	4:55
6.	"Need for Limited Loss (New Track)"	5:19
Total length:		38:27

== Personnel ==
=== Aborym ===
- Malfeitor Fabban - Vocals, bass, synthesizers, programming, samples, lyrics
- Paolo Pieri - Guitars, synthesizers, programming, samples
- Bård G. "Faust" Eithun - Drums

Additional

- Emiliano Natali - Bass (additional)
- Agonia BV - Vocals (additional) (track 6 (disc 2))
- Emiliano Natali - Engineering, mixing, mastering
- Fabban - Producer, mixing, artwork, layout, lyrics
- Paolo Pieri - Producer
