= Shifting.negative =

Studio album by Aborym
- Released: 15 January 2017
- Genre: Industrial music
- Length: 47:10
- Label: Agonia Records

Aborym chronology
Dirty (2013)	Shifting.negative (2017)	Hostile (2021)

Shifting.negative is the seventh full-length album by Italian industrial music band Aborym. Released in 2017 by Agonia Records, the album got mediocre reviews.

Comparing to the previous album Dirty from four years prior, Shifting.negative was recorded with a new lineup except for mainstay Malfeitor Fabban, as well as "an endless list of guest appearances". Also, with Aborym previously having been an industrial black metal band, Fabban's band had now shed the black metal elements.

== Reception ==
Rock Hard bestowed 4 marks out of 10, and Dead Rhetoric placed themselves in the same landscape with 5.5 points. The reviewer found it to be "dry and aimless", calling it "a misguided attempt at a full break-away from a band's core sound". A staff reviewer for Sputnik Music gave an "awful" score, 1 out of 5. The album was a "piece of garbage" with "nothing good to say about".

A more positiv review was found at Metal.de, with 7 out of 10 points. The reviewer was not disappointed with the shift away from black metal towards the style of early Marilyn Manson. This was a "bold move" showing "extreme versatility, diversity, and openness", and the ensuing album was "compelling", "complex and unconventional". There were catchy parts to every song, the reviewer opined. Metal Hammer gave the same fraction, 3.5 out of 5, commenting that "Shifting.negative is barking mad, intermittently brilliant and not what anyone was expecting". Metal Injection gave 6 points, but found the album to be enjoyable for those who "dig ambient soundscapes, beat-driven music with hints of the menacing".

== Track listing ==
1. "Unpleasantness" – 5:52
2. "Precarious" – 5:44
3. "Decadence in a Nutshell" – 3:58
4. "10050 Cielo Drive" – 3:19
5. "Slipping Through the Cracks" – 4:15
6. "You Can't Handle the Truth" – 3:38
7. "For a Better Past" – 6:02
8. "Tragedies for Sale" – 4:32
9. "Going New Places" – 4:29
10. "Big H" – 5:21
