= With No Human Intervention =

Studio album by Aborym
- Released: 8 January 2003
- Genre: Industrial black metal
- Length: 64:51
- Label: SPV

Aborym chronology
Fire Walk with Us! (2000)	With No Human Intervention (2003)	Generator (2006)

Professional ratings
Review scores
Source	Rating
Allmusic	3.5/5 stars
Vampster	unfavourable

With No Human Intervention is the third album by industrial black metal band Aborym. The album's title was coined by former Emperor drummer Bard Eithun, as well as the lyrics for the title track and "Faustian Spirit of the Earth". Carpathian Forest vocalist Nattefrost provides backing vocals on various tracks, as well as lead vocals on "The Alienation of a Blackened Heart".

This is the last Aborym album to feature Attila Csihar as the primary lead vocalist (he returned once more as lead vocalist on the track "Man Bites God" on Generator), as he left the band to re-join Mayhem. Guitarist Set Teitan departed after this album in order to join Dissection.

== Track listing ==
No.	Title	Length
1.	"Antichristian Codec (Intro)"	0:30
2.	"With No Human Intervention"	6:19
3.	"U.V. Impaler"	3:24
4.	"Humechanics-Virus"	4:55
5.	"Does Not Compute"	4:04
6.	"Faustian Spirit of the Earth"	5:25
7.	"Digital Coat Masque"	6:10
8.	"The Triumph"	9:58
9.	"Black Hole Spell"	5:11
10.	"Me(n)tal Striken Terror Action 2"	4:30
11.	"Out of Shell"	4:34
12.	"Chernobyl Generation"	6:04
13.	"The Alienation of a Blackened Heart"	2:47
14.	"Automatik Rave'olution Aborym"	3:31
Total length:		1:07:22

== Personnel ==
- Set Teitan– guitars, sampling, electronic drums
- Malfeitor Fabban – bass, synthesizer, keyboards, programming
- Attila Csihar – vocals, backing vocals
- Nysrok Infernalien – guitars, guitar solos, synthesizer, keyboards, programming
