= Daemon (album) =

Studio album by Mayhem
- Released: 25 October 2019
- Recorded: NBS, Stockholm, Sweden; Lupercal, Oslo, Norway; Chamber, Hillegom, Netherlands; SBM, Oslo, Norway
- Genre: Black metal
- Length: 49:24
- Label: Century Media
- Producer: Tore Stjerna; Teloch

Mayhem chronology
Esoteric Warfare (2014)	Daemon (2019)	Atavistic Black Disorder/Kommando (2021)

Daemon is the sixth studio album by Norwegian black metal band Mayhem. Their major label debut, it was released by Century Media Records on 25 October 2019 in digital formats while a manufacturing problem delayed the physical release until 8 November 2019.

== Background and promotion ==
The band went into the studio not long after the De Mysteriis Dom Sathanas Alive anniversary tour in which the band played the iconic debut album in its entirety for various dates around the world. Many critics suggested the tour was highly influential to the sound of Daemon with many comparing it to that album. The album was also released on the back of the Lords of Chaos semi-biopic movie, giving the band a boost in popularity and interest.

During promotional interviews for the album, Necrobutcher claimed he was "On [his] way to kill Euronymous but Varg beat [him] to it", and also claimed that the Norwegian Police were aware of Vikernes' plot to kill Euronymous, stating: "But little did I know that the Norwegian police already knew that Count Grishnackh [Varg] was going down also to kill him. Because they bugged his phone, and he actually talked about this killing before he went to Bergen so the cops already knew that he was coming, so they probably were thinking to themselves, ‘We didn’t nail this guy for the church burnings, so let’s nail him for murder, and get rid of this f–king guy in Oslo the same time.’ So that’s basically what happened."

The bonus disc for the album features a cover of "Disgusting Semla" from former vocalist Dead's pre-Mayhem band Morbid.

== Reception ==
Professional ratings
Aggregate scores
Source	Rating
Metacritic	69/100
Review scores
Source	Rating
Blabbermouth.net	9/10
Consequence of Sound	A−
Exclaim!	8/10
Metal Hammer	4.5/5 stars
Metal Storm	7.8/10
Sputnikmusic	3.0/5

Daemon was met with favorable reviews by critics upon release. Loudersound awarded it 4.5 out of 5 and strongly compared it to the band's debut album De Mysteriis Dom Sathanas. Metal Storm awarded it a 7.8 out of 10 calling it a return to form and "leaving behind the experimental and dissonant sound" of earlier releases. Consequence of Sound awarded the album an A− calling it a "return to form". Blabbermouth.net awarded it a 9 out of 10. Sputnikmusic were more critical, awarding it only 3.0 out of 5, stating "Daemon is a solid dose of black metal, and not much else".

== Track listing ==
All tracks are written by Teloch, except where noted.

No.	Title	Lyrics	Music	Length
1.	"The Dying False King"			3:45
2.	"Agenda Ignis"			4:34
3.	"Bad Blood"	Necrobutcher	Ghul	4:58
4.	"Malum"	Hellhammer	Ghul	5:05
5.	"Falsified and Hated"			5:48
6.	"Aeon Daemonium"			6:03
7.	"Worthless Abominations Destroyed"			3:48
8.	"Daemon Spawn"			6:02
9.	"Of Worms and Ruins"	Ghul	Ghul	3:48
10.	"Invoke the Oath"	Attila Csihar		5:33
Total length:				47:21

Limited Edition CD bonus tracks

No.	Title	Length
11.	"Everlasting Dying Flame"	5:53
12.	"Black Glass Communion"	4:25

Limited Edition Vinyl bonus disc

No.	Title	Length
1.	"Everlasting Dying Flame"	5:52
2.	"Black Glass Communion"	4:25
3.	"Evil Dead (Death cover)"	2:59
4.	"The Truth (Death Strike cover)"	3:03
5.	"Disgusting Semla (Morbid cover)"	3:06

== Personnel ==
Mayhem

- Attila – vocals
- Ghul – guitars
- Hellhammer – drums
- Necrobutcher – bass
- Teloch – guitars

Additional personnel

- Tore Stjerna – producer, mixing, engineering
- Teloch – producer
- Marco Salluzzo – co-engineering
- Thomas Johansson – mastering
- Daniel Valeriani – artworks and layout
- Ester Segarra – photos

== Charts ==
Chart (2019)	Peak position
Austrian Albums (Ö3 Austria)	35
Belgian Albums (Ultratop Flanders)	78
Belgian Albums (Ultratop Wallonia)	125
Finnish Albums (Suomen virallinen lista)	8
French Albums (SNEP)	145
German Albums (Offizielle Top 100)	18
Hungarian Albums (MAHASZ)	28
Italian Albums (FIMI)	84
Spanish Albums (PROMUSICAE)	78
Swedish Albums (Sverigetopplistan)	32
Swiss Albums (Schweizer Hitparade)	37
US Heatseekers Albums (Billboard)	4
