= White2 =

2004 album by Sunn O)))

Studio album by Sunn O)))
- Released: June 29, 2004
- Recorded: Aug 2002–Feb 2004
- Genre: Drone metal, dark ambient
- Length: 62:51 (CD edition); 87:55 (Double vinyl edition)
- Label: Southern Lord Records (SUNN31)
- Producer: Stephen O'Malley & Rex Ritter

Sunn O))) chronology
White1 (2003)	White2 (2004)	Black One (2005)

Professional ratings
Review scores
Source	Rating
Allmusic link	4/5 stars
Pitchfork Media link	8.0/10

White2 is the fourth studio album by American drone metal band Sunn O))). It was recorded during the same sessions as White1, but it was not released until a year later.

This album features Attila Csihar of Mayhem fame quoting the Srimad Bhagavatam on "Decay2 [Nihils' Maw]". The vinyl also features him on "Decay [The Symptoms of Kali Yuga]". "HELL-O)))-WEEN" is a more traditional Sunn O))) track, harkening back to The Grimmrobe Demos in its all-guitar-and-bass approach. A DOD Buzz Box effects pedal designed to imitate the sound of Buzz Osborne of The Melvins was used for the bass effects on "bassAliens".

The cover art is a drawing by Pieter Bruegel the Elder called The Bee-Keepers.

== Track listing ==
No.	Title	Length
1.	"HELL-O)))-WEEN"	14:05
2.	"bassAliens"	23:22
3.	"Decay2 [Nihils' Maw]"	24:09
Total length:		62:51

Vinyl and digital bonus track
No.	Title	Length
4.	"Decay (The Symptoms of Kali Yuga)"	26:19
Total length:		87:55

== Session musicians ==
- Attila Csihar – vocals
- Joe Preston
- Rex Ritter
- Dawn Smithson

== See also ==
- White1
- WHITEbox
