= The Holy Down =

Live album by Gravetemple
- Released: 2007
- Recorded: 2006
- Genre: Experimental
- Label: Southern Lord (SUNN72)

The Holy Down documents a series of shows played by Gravetemple in Israel during the summer of 2006. Illustrations for the series were done by Justin Bartlett.

== Track listing ==
No.	Title	Length
1.	"The Holy Down"	60:15

== Line up ==
- Attila Csihar - vocals
- Stephen O'Malley - guitar
- Oren Ambarchi - guitar, drums, bells
