= Kali Yuga Bizarre =

Studio album by Aborym
- Released: 1 April 1999
- Recorded: October, 1998
- Studio: Temple of Noise Studios, Rome, Italy
- Genre: Industrial black metal
- Length: 46:25
- Label: Scarlet Records

Aborym chronology
Kali Yuga Bizarre (1999)	Fire Walk with Us! (2001)

Professional ratings
Review scores
Source	Rating
Rock Hard	3/10

Kali Yuga Bizarre is the first full-length studio album by the Italian industrial black metal band Aborym. It was released in 1999 on Scarlet records. A picture LP was also re-released in 2000 and was limited to 1000 copies.

Vocals on this album were performed by original vocalist Yorga SM as well as guest vocalist Attila Csihar.

== Track listing ==
No.	Title	Length
1.	"Wehrmacht Kali Ma"	4:02
2.	"Horrenda Peccata Christi"	6:27
3.	"Hellraiser (Coil cover)"	4:16
4.	"Roma Divina Urbs"	8:59
5.	"Darka Mysteria"	4:55
6.	"Tantra Bizarre"	4:12
7.	"Come Thou Long Expected Jesus"	2:22
8.	"Metal Striken Terror Action"	3:56
9.	"The First Four Trumpets"	7:00
Total length:		46:09

== Personnel ==
- Malfeitor Fabban – bass, keyboards, samples, synth, backing vocals
- Yorga SM - vocals
- Attila Csihar – vocals
- Sethlans D.T.A. – guitars, samples
- Nysrok Infernalien - guitars, additional vocals
- Asmod Gvas XI Volgar dei Xacrestani - vocals on track 7, "declaration" on track 8
