= Maria Kolokouri =

- Also known as: Tristessa
- Born: 6 April 1977; Areopoli, Laconia, Greece
- Died: 10 August 2014 (aged 37) Greece
- Genres: black metal
- Instruments: bass, guitar, keyboard, vocals
- Works: Black Sorrow for a Dead Brother (Demo, 1995) "Zephyrous / Vorphalack! (1995) "Dancing in the Dark Lakes of Evil" (1997) "Doomed Dark Years" (1998) "Rise From Within" (2000) "Quod Superius Sicut Inferius" (2002) "Sirens" (2004) "Demonized" (2007)
- Years active: 1995–2014
- Labels: Black Lotus, Avantgarde Music
- Formerly of: Obscure Natus, Profane Serenity, Vorphalack, Lloth, Astarte

Maria "Tristessa" Kolokouri (Greek: Μαρία Κολοκούρη; 6 April 1977 – 10 August 2014) was a Greek black metal vocalist and multi-instrumentalist. She was the frontwoman and bassist of the all-female black metal band Astarte and was also involved with the bands Lloth, Obscure Natus, Profane Serenity and Vorphalack.

== Early life and family ==
Kolokouri was born in 1977 in Areopoli, Laconia, Greece. She married rock musician Nicolas Maiis. They had one son together.

== Career ==
During her early music career, Kolokouri played in the bands Vorphalack, Insected, Obscure Natusand Profane Serenity. She then became a member of the all-female black metal band Lloth, who were founded in September 1995 at Athens, Attica.

Shortly after releasing their first album on Black Lotus Records, Lloth adopted the name Astarte, after the Semitic goddess of sexuality.

In 2003, Astarte featured on the tribute album to Swiss metal band Celtic Frost, called Order of the Tyrants and released by Black Lotus Records. They covered the song "Sorrows Of The Moon." The band also collaborated with other European metal musicians, such as with Shagrath from Dimmu Borgir and Sakis Tolis from Rotting Christ on the album Sirens; and with Angela Gossow from Arch Enemy and Henri Sattler from God Dethroned on the album Demonized.

In 2011, Kolokouri and Astarte featured on the cover of the first edition of Seattle based The Synn Report.

== Death and legacy ==
In 2013, Kolokouri was diagnosed with the blood cancer leukemia. She died of complications from the illness in 2014, aged 37.

After Kolokouri's death, remaining and former members of Astarte announced that they would be reuniting and readopting their initial band name, Lloth. They released the album "Athanati," the Greek word for immortal, dedicated to her memory and legacy. The previously unreleased Astarte thrash and death metal album "Blackdemonium" featuring her vocals was released in 2025.

Lloth members and Kolokouri's husband Mais also established the yearly Greek charity festival Astarte Fest in her honour. The festival supports charity The Smile of the Child. 2025 will be the third festival held.

== Discography ==
With Vorphalack:

- Black Sorrow for a Dead Brother (Demo, 1995)
- Zephyrous / Vorphalack (1995)
- Lullabies of a Vampire (2001)

With Lloth:

- "Dancing in the Dark Lakes of Evil" (1997)

With Astarte:

- "Doomed Dark Years" (1998)
- "Rise From Within" (2000)
- "Quod Superius Sicut Inferius" (2002)
- "Sirens" (2004)
- "Demonized" (2007)
- "Blackdemonium" (2025)
