= Demonized (album) =

Studio album by Astarte
- Released: 26 April 2007; Athens, Greece
- Recorded: May–June 2007 at TicoTico Studio’s; Finland
- Genre: Blackened death metal
- Length: 50:49
- Label: Avantgarde

Astarte chronology
Sirens (2004)	Demonized (2007)

Demonized is the fifth album by the Greek black metal band Astarte. Just like its predecessor Sirens, Demonized was recorded in hometown Athens, Greece and mixed at the renowned TicoTico Studio’s in Finland. The band also managed to invite some very renowned guest-musicians once again to play on their album.

== Track listing ==
1. "Mutter Astarte" – 4:43
2. "God I Hate them All" – 5:11
3. "Lost" – 4:53
4. "Whispers of Chaos" – 1:00
5. "Demonized" – 3:59
6. "Lycon" – 5:41 (feat. Attila of Mayhem)
7. "Queen of the Damned" – 5:29 (feat. Henri T.S.K. of God Dethroned)
8. "Heart of Flames (Burn)" – 5:36
9. "God Among Men" – 5:05 (feat. Nicolas S.I.C. Maiis of LLOTH and Insected)
10. "Everlast" – 3:33
11. "Black at Heart" – 4:47 (feat. Angela Gossow of Arch Enemy)
12. "Black Star" – 5:28
13. "Princess of the Dawn" – 5:17 (Accept cover)
14. "Everlast II (Phoenix Rising)" – 4:13

Total playtime: 64:55 minutes.

== Personnel ==
- Maria "Tristessa" Kolokouri − bass, guitar, keyboards, vocals
- Derketa - keyboards
- Hybris - guitars
- Ice - drums
- Lycon - session guitars, bass

=== Guest appearances ===
1. Attila Csihar of Mayhem did some guest vocals on Lycon.
2. Henri Sattler from God Dethroned did some guest vocals on Queen of the Damned.
3. Just like on the previous album, Nicolas Sic Maiis of Lloth is present. He is featured on God Among Men.
4. Angela Gossow of Arch Enemy was invited to the recording studio. She duets with Tristessa on Black at Heart.
