= Gravetemple =

American band

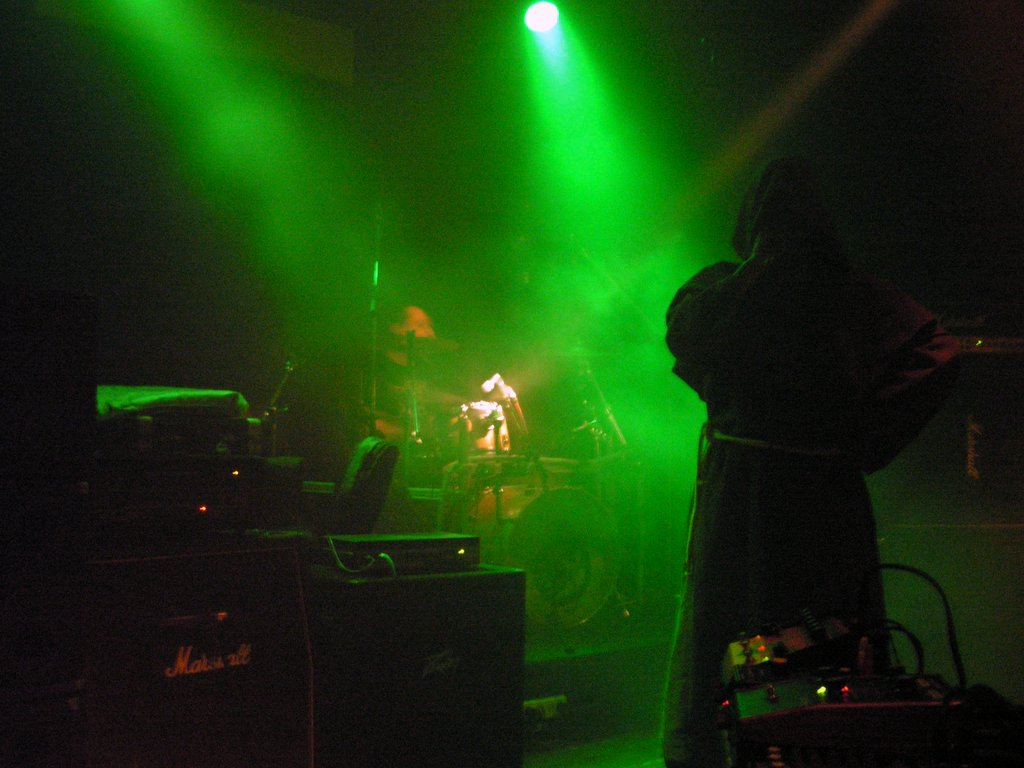

Background information
- Also known as: Grave Temple Trio
- Origin: United States
- Genres: Drone metal, experimental rock
- Years active: 2006–present
- Labels: Southern Lord Records
- Members: Attila Csihar; Stephen O'Malley; Oren Ambarchi

Gravetemple is an American drone metal band, consisting of Attila Csihar, Stephen O'Malley and Oren Ambarchi. The trio formed in the summer of 2006 when Sunn O))) was invited to play in Israel, while Israel was engaged in the 2006 Lebanon War, and some of its members refused to travel there. In Summer 2008, the trio reformed together with Australian drummer Matt "Skitz" Sanders for a short European tour. This band is not to be confused with the Burial Chamber Trio, which consists of a similar line-up but with Greg Anderson instead of Stephen O'Malley. Gravetemple released The Holy Down in 2007 through Southern Lord Records.

The band's second studio album, Impassable Fears, was reviewed by The Quietus, which remarked, "Impassable Fears actually sees the band subvert metal tropes into incongruous structures, similar to the mockingly ecclesiastical power electronics of Theologian rather than the blasphemous black metal barrage of Csihar’s Mayhem or the sustained drone of O’Malley’s Sunn O."

== Discography ==
=== Studio albums ===
- The Holy Down (CD 2007) - limited to 3000 copies
- Impassable Fears (2017)

=== Demos ===
- Ambient/Ruin (demo CDR 2008)
- "Le Vampire de Paris" (CD 2009) Limited to 350 copies
