= Aborym =

Italian industrial black metal band

- Origin: Taranto, Italy
- Genre: Industrial black metal
- Years active: 1992–present
- Labels: Agonia; Stridulation
- Members: Fabban; Giulio Moschini
- Website: www.facebook.com/aborymofficial/

Aborym are an Italian industrial black metal band from Taranto, Apulia, formed in 1993. The band have described their music as "alien-black-hard/industrial", whilst Allmusic described them as playing "a truly original brand of futuristic black metal [with] jagged samples, electronic drums, and industrial overtones, mak[ing] Aborym's peculiar sound very hard to pin down or define". The name of the band derives from Haborym Sadek Aym, overseer of the twenty-six legions of Hell in a seventeenth-century grimoire.

== History ==
=== Early years and Kali Yuga Bizarre (1993–1999) ===
Aborym were originally formed in 1991 or 1992 by bass player and vocalist Malfeitor Fabban, who also played bass for Funeral Oration and keyboards for M.E.M.O.R.Y. Lab. At the beginning the three piece line-up performed covers of bands like Sodom, Celtic Frost, Mayhem, Sepultura, Sarcófago, Morbid, Rotting Christ and Darkthrone. Along with Alex Noia (guitars) and Mental Siege (drums), Fabban recorded the first Aborym demo, the five-track Worshipping Damned Souls, in 1993. The band split up shortly afterwards and were reformed by Fabban in Rome in 1997. With the new members Yorga SM and Sethlans, the second demo (Antichristian Nuclear Sabbath) was recorded that same year. The band struck a deal with the Italian Scarlet Records for two albums.

Their first full-length album, Kali Yuga Bizarre, was released in March 1999. The album featured guest vocals from Attila Csihar, well known in the black metal scene for his work with Mayhem, Tormentor and Plasma Pool. During the recording session, the band added a second guitarist, Nysrok Infernalien Sathanas, of the band Satanikk Terrorists. Csihar joined the band full-time after the recording, replacing Yorga SM. The album was well-received, with the caveat that was to become their trademark: one has to be open-minded when listening to it. Metalion of Slayer Magazine commented about the album: "Well, most of the Black Metal releases today don't rise anyone's attention, still there is a never-ending quest to find interesting bands. And this time we have come up with a winner. Aborym from Italy. This is what Black Metal should be all about. Ugliness, rawness, destruction, scary..."

=== Fire Walk with Us (1999–2002) ===
In 2001, Aborym released their second album Fire Walk with Us, with Csihar fulfilling vocal duties and the band including a cover of Norwegian band Burzum's "Det som en gang var". The album was extremely well received. Terrorizer awarded it album of the month with a maximum score of 10/10, commenting: "Most black-heads will hate it, others will be curiously offended by it, and a fearless few will call it their own and use it as their very lifeblood. You can almost see the majority snicker at Aborym's psychedelic time-travel-meets-corpse-paint image, but these visuals serve to underline specifically where band and record belong: the outer reaches of the cosmos." The album also made Terrorizer's Albums of the Year for 2001, at position 39. Eduardo Rivadavia of Allmusic highlighted the potentially divisive nature of the record, stating: "Is it any good? Well, it really comes down to how the listener positions himself along the digital divide. Those who prefer their Metal stripped down and straightforward will likely find Aborym too Industrial and chaotic. Yet for fans of truly unique new directions in Metal, Fire Walk With Us is a full-course meal." Again, Metalion, of Slayer Magazine, said:"Aborym brought a new level of unexpected disturbance to Black Metal."

=== With No Human Intervention (2003–2005) ===
2003 saw Aborym release With No Human Intervention through Code666 in Europe and Mercenary Musik/WEA/Arista in the United States. The album continued to expand on the band's experimentation with Electronica, with Aborym citing influences from drum and bass, jungle, techno, classical, EBM and industrial. The album featured guest appearances from Bård Eithun, Roger Rasmussen Nattefrost, Matt Jarman (of Void), Mick Kenney and Richard Szabo (of Timewave Zero). The album, again, achieved Album of the Month in Terrorizer, with Stuart Banks remarking: "With No Human Intervention shows a band pulling out all the stops to push the extreme and avant-garde to new depths and, quite frankly, making it look easy. Aborym have made Black Metal more than just relevant, they have given the genre a visceral vividness. Their ability to master forces of primitive rawness, cosmic elementals, cold machinery and ritualistic pounding, blending them into decadent layers of speed, dark grooves of hate and reality warping sounds which comprise this album, dismembers sanity". Opinion, again, was mixed, however, with Dave Ling, of Metal Hammer UK commenting: "Aborym have somehow found a way of effectively mutating Black Metal's original strain with blasts of industrial noise and electronic effects." Nathan Pearce also said: "Aborym has solidified their sound and reputation with the release of the OUTSTANDING 'With No Human Intervention'. With the success of the genre defining Fire Walk With Us, Aborym was being looked to as the answer to the somewhat stagnant Black Metal scene." In a 2009 retrospective on black metal, Ciaran Tracey reflected:

The fact remains, though, that most bands wishing to transcend the archetype of bee-in-a-biscuit-tin guitars haven't actually been that radical. Take for example Aborym's 'Fire Walk With Us!' (2001) and 'With No Human Intervention' (2003), which were both met with rapturous reception on account of their cold processed extremity. Although resplendent in a sort of cyber-black metal, UV glowing, post-apocalyptic chic borrowed extensively from contemporary goth club culture (including the drugs), the music was more or less decent BM made a bit more digital by overtly computerised drumming and a liberal smattering of samples.

In 2004, Aborym played at the Inferno Metal Festival in Oslo, with Eithun guesting on drums for the track "Alienation of a Blackened Heart".

=== Generator (2006–2009) ===
In 2005 Csihar left Aborym to return to Mayhem and was replaced by Preben "Prime Evil" Mulvik of Mysticum and Amok. Faust joined the band on drums as a permanent member, and guitarist Set Teitan moved to Sweden to join Dissection. Aborym signed with a bigger label in the form of Season of Mist to release their fourth record, Generator. Chad Bowar of About.com praised the album's atmospheric elements and the vocals of Mulvik, noting also that Csihar returns to appear on one track ("Man Bites Dog"). Jeremy Garner of Metal Reviews commented: "I'll be fucked if any Black Metal band tops this effort for a while. Any fan of Black Metal regardless of subgenre preferences should take the opportunity to delve into this. Pure excellence". Nathan Pearce of Ultimatemetal.com comment that: "Aborym is now a band that should appeal to a wider audience without alienating their already solid fan base".

In July 2007, Nysrok Infernalien Sathanas, Aborym's long-term guitarist, left the band, stating that his "approach to our way of working, living and thinking" was out of sync with the rest of the band. Mulvik also departed the band to concentrate on other priorities in his life.

=== Psychogrotesque (2010–2012) ===
In 2010, Aborym became a trio: Fabban, Bård G. Eithun and new guitarist Paolo "Hell:IO:Kabbalus" Pieri. Recording the fifth album commenced on 20 February, at Fear No One Studios, under the supervision of sound engineer Emiliano Natali. The band announced that the album would consist of a single track, which they described as "a harsh sonic monolith of sickness and depravity".

The album featured sound consulting by Marc Urselli Shrarer at Eastside Sound Studios, New York. As usual, the album was announced to be featuring a number of guest appearances, in this case Narchost (of Fabban's other band, Malfeitor), Karyn Crisis (Crisis), Davide Tiso (Ephel Duath), Marcello Balena, and Richard Szabo (of Timewave Zero), amongst others yet to be revealed. In August 2010, Aborym announced that the title of the fifth album was to be Psychgrotesque and was to be released on 8 November in Europe (23 November in the USA). The band described the album as a "realistic story about the horrific human aridity and its fragile impotence. A social metaphor, uncomfortable but very current, treated cynically by bassist-singer Fabban through a story set in a mental hospital, which suggests that he used his pen with an absolute commitment and the determination to keep off ABORYM from the banality and clichés both ideological/aptitudinal and musical that saturate the extreme metal scene."

The band described the album as: "a realistic story about the horrific human aridity and its fragile impotence. A social metaphor, uncomfortable but very current, treated cynically by bassist/singer Fabban through a story set in a mental hospital, which suggests that he used his pen with an absolute commitment and the determination to keep off Aborym from the banality and both ideological/aptitudinal and musical clichés that saturate the Extreme Metal scene". Alex, from Archaic Magazine commented: "The very aptly named Psychogrotesque once again manages to make most Black Metal acts sound like Lady Gaga: the suffocating levels of abject perversion are scarily palpable, drenched in truly malignant horror and overt twistedness".

Peter Loftus, from Norway's Eternal Terror, said: "There is so much to love here, and it speaks lots that such an intense and insane album can be crafted to have such a wide appeal. Definitely recommended". Pier Marzano of Italy's Grindzone wrote:"Citare se stessi è un lusso che si concede ai soli maestri del genere; reinventarsi pur riferendosi palesemente al proprio passato, non ha prezzo. Imperdibili, anche questa volta".

=== Dirty (2012–2013) ===
In October 2012, Aborym entered Fear No One studios to record their sixth album, the follow-up to Psychogrotesque. The new album is planned to be released in 2013 through Agonia Records. The band are also working on a special song in order to celebrate the anniversary of the first 20 years of their career - an assembly of riffs, ideas, lyrics, loops and grooves sent by fans. Furthermore, a big fanwall poster is under construction with hundreds of photos from fans.

After many years since their last live appearances, Aborym are to officially announce their collaboration with The Flaming Arts booking agency. They have signed an exclusive worldwide contract. Aborym have planned live shows with a digital drum-machine, as the band did in their previous shows, so the drummer, Bård G. Eithun "Faust", will not be part of the live line-up. Alongside vocalist Fabban and guitarist Paolo Pieri, Aborym will be on stage with the addition of a second guest guitarist and a guest bass player.

Details of Dirty, their 6th full-length album, have been announced. The 10-track double album, which will be available in digipack, jewel case and gatefold double LP formats, is set for release on Agonia Records on 28 May in Europe and 11 June in the USA/North America. Dirty was recorded at Fear No One Studios, in Italy, with Emiliano Natali, reprising his role as sound engineer from the band's Psychogrotesque album, and it is helmed by Marc Urselli, of New York's Eastside Sound Studio, who has worked with the likes of Mike Patton, John Zorn and Lou Reed. The electronic part of the album is engineered by D. Loop (Kebabtraume and Limbo). R.G. Narchost (Stormcrow, Demon's Shade and Drowning Ashes) created The Spiral Shaped Chamber custom sounds' library for the band. The artwork has been crafted by Aborym's Fabban.

The first CD features new material, whilst the second comes with two tracks from previous albums, which have been completely re-arranged and re-recorded, as well as with covers from tracks by Iron Maiden, Pink Floyd and Nine Inch Nails, plus a previously unreleased track performed by several musicians such as Agonia BV, Tamara Picardo, Samuel Heru Ra Ha MK, Hostis, Ulven, Mike Bizzini, David Cholasta, Tobias Dünnebacke, Jonathan Butcher, Jessy Lavallee, Thomas Hochstetler, Mary J. Rooks, Amanda Neilson, Mark Llewellyn and several fans. The song was written by Alberto Penzin (CO_{2} and ex-Schizo) and was spliced together from all the different sources.

The band played at Prague Death Mass in 2023.

== Discography ==
=== Demos ===
- Worshipping Damned Souls (1993)
- Antichristian Nuclear Sabbath (1997)

=== Studio albums ===
- Kali Yuga Bizarre (1999)
- Fire Walk with Us! (2001)
- With No Human Intervention (2003)
- Generator (2006)
- Psychogrotesque (2010)
- Dirty (2013)
- Shifting.negative (2017)
- Hostile (2021)
- Metachaos (2026)

== Members ==
=== Current members ===
- Malfeitor Fabban - bass, synthesizers, vocals (1993–present)
- Gianluca Catalani - drums (2018–present)
- Tomas Aurizzi - guitars (2019–present)

=== Previous members ===
- Yorga SM - vocals (1997–1999; died 2024)
- Attila Csihar - vocals (1999–2005)
- Preben "Prime Evil" Mulvik - vocals (2005–2009)
- Alex Noia - guitar (1993–1998)
- David "Set Teitan" Totaro - guitar (1997–2005)
- Nysrok Infernalien Sathanas - guitar, keyboards (1998–2007)
- D. Belvedere - drums (1993–1998)
- Bård G. "Faust" Eithun - Drums (2005-2014)
- Paolo "Hell:I0:Kabbalus" Pieri - guitar, synthesizer, backing vocals (2008–2016)
- Giulio Moschini - guitar (2014–2016)
- Dan V - guitars, bass (2016–?)
- Stefano Angiulli - keyboards (2016–2019)
- Rg Narchost - bass (2016–2021)
