= Firewalk (computing) =

Network security analysis technique

Firewalking is a technique developed by Mike Schiffman and David Goldsmith, utilizing traceroute techniques and TTL values to analyze IP packet responses in mapping networks and determining gateway ACL filters. It is an active reconnaissance network security analysis technique that attempts to determine which layer 4 protocols a specific firewall will allow.

Firewalk is a software tool that performs Firewalking.

To protect a firewall or gateway against firewalking, one can block outgoing TTL messages to avoid exposing information about your network. Additionally, using Network Address Translation is useful in hiding internal network addresses.

== See also ==
- Access Control List
- Firewall (computing)
- Traceroute
