= Astarte (band) =

Greek black metal band

- Also known as: Lloth
- Origin: Athens, Greece
- Genres: Black metal; blackened death metal
- Years active: 1995–2014
- Labels: Black Lotus; Avantgarde Music
- Members: Derketa; Hybris; Ice; Lycon
- Past members: (see below)

Astarte was an all-female black metal band from Athens, Greece, named after the goddess Astarte.

== History ==
Astarte formed as Lloth in September 1995 in Athens, Attica. The original line-up included Maria "Tristessa" Kolokouri (bass, guitar, keyboards), who took over on lead vocals, Nemesis (guitar), and Kinthia (vocals, guitar). Psychoslaughter, of Greek band Invocation, play session drums on their demo, Dancing in the Dark Lakes of Evil, released as Lloth in 1997. Shortly after, they adopted the name Astarte after the Semitic goddess of sexuality. Their debut full-length album, Doomed Dark Years, appeared in 1998 on Black Lotus Records. Two further LPs followed on the label. After Nemesis and Kinthia left to be replaced with Katharsis (keyboards) and Hybris (guitar), they released their fourth and fifth albums on Avantgarde Music, the most recent of which, Demonized, was released in 2007. In 2003, the band participated in the Celtic Frost Tribute album Order of the Tyrants, released by Black Lotus Records, covering "Sorrows Of The Moon".

On December 30, 2013, Maria Kolokouri's husband Nick Maiis revealed that she had leukemia and was critically ill. On August 9, 2014, Maiis posted another statement, saying that Maria had beaten leukemia but the complications from the disease had taken a turn for the worse and she was not expected to survive the day. Shortly after, another post on Tristessa's official Facebook page stated that she had died.

On August 10, 2014, Metal Archives reported that Astarte had split up following Tristessa's death, as she was the leader and only consistent member for nearly twenty years.

In September 2014, the remaining members of Astarte announced that they would reunite and revert to Lloth. They said that previous members would join them to release their first recording since the 1997 demo Dancing in the Dark Lakes of Evil, dedicated to Tristessa. The group revealed a new logo, in which the "t" in Lloth is also meant to honor Tristessa.

== Members ==
=== Final lineup ===
- Derketa – keyboards
- Nikos "Ice" Asimakis – drums
- Lycon – session guitars, bass
- Hybris – guitar (2003–2014)

=== Former members ===
- Nemesis – guitar (1995–2003)
- Kinthia – guitar, lead vocals (1995–2003)
- Katharsis – keyboards (2003–2008)
- Psychoslaughter aka Aithir – session drums (1995–1997)
- Stelios Darakis – drums
- Stelios Mavromitis – guitars
- SIC – vocals
- Maria "Tristessa" Kolokouri – bass, guitar, keyboards (1995–2014), vocals (2003–2014; her death)

=== Special guests ===
- Spiros Antoniou from Septicflesh ("Astarte" of the album Quod superius sicut inferius)
- SIC from Lloth ("Bitterness of Mortality (Mecoman)" of the album Sirens)
- Shagrath from Dimmu Borgir ("The Ring (of Sorrow)" of the album Sirens)
- Sakis Tolis from Rotting Christ ("Oceanus Procellarum (Liquid Tomb)" of the album Sirens)
- Attila Csihar from Mayhem ("Lycon" of the album Demonized)
- SIC from Lloth ("God Among Men" of the album Demonized)
- Henri Sattler from God Dethroned ("Queen of the Damned" of the album Demonized)
- Angela Gossow from Arch Enemy ("Black at Heart" of the album Demonized)

== Discography ==
Lloth

- Dancing in the Dark Lakes of Evil (1997)

Astarte

- Doomed Dark Years (1998), Black Lotus Records
- Rise From Within (2000), Black Lotus
- Quod superius sicut inferius (2002), Black Lotus
- Sirens (2004), Avantgarde Music
- Demonized (2007), Avantgarde Music
