= Firewalker =

Firewalker may refer to:

- A practitioner of firewalking
- Firewalker (film), a 1986 film
- "Firewalker" (The X-Files), an episode from season 2 of The X-Files
- Mass Effect 2: Firewalker, a downloadable content pack for the video game Mass Effect 2
