= Sear Bliss =

Hungarian band

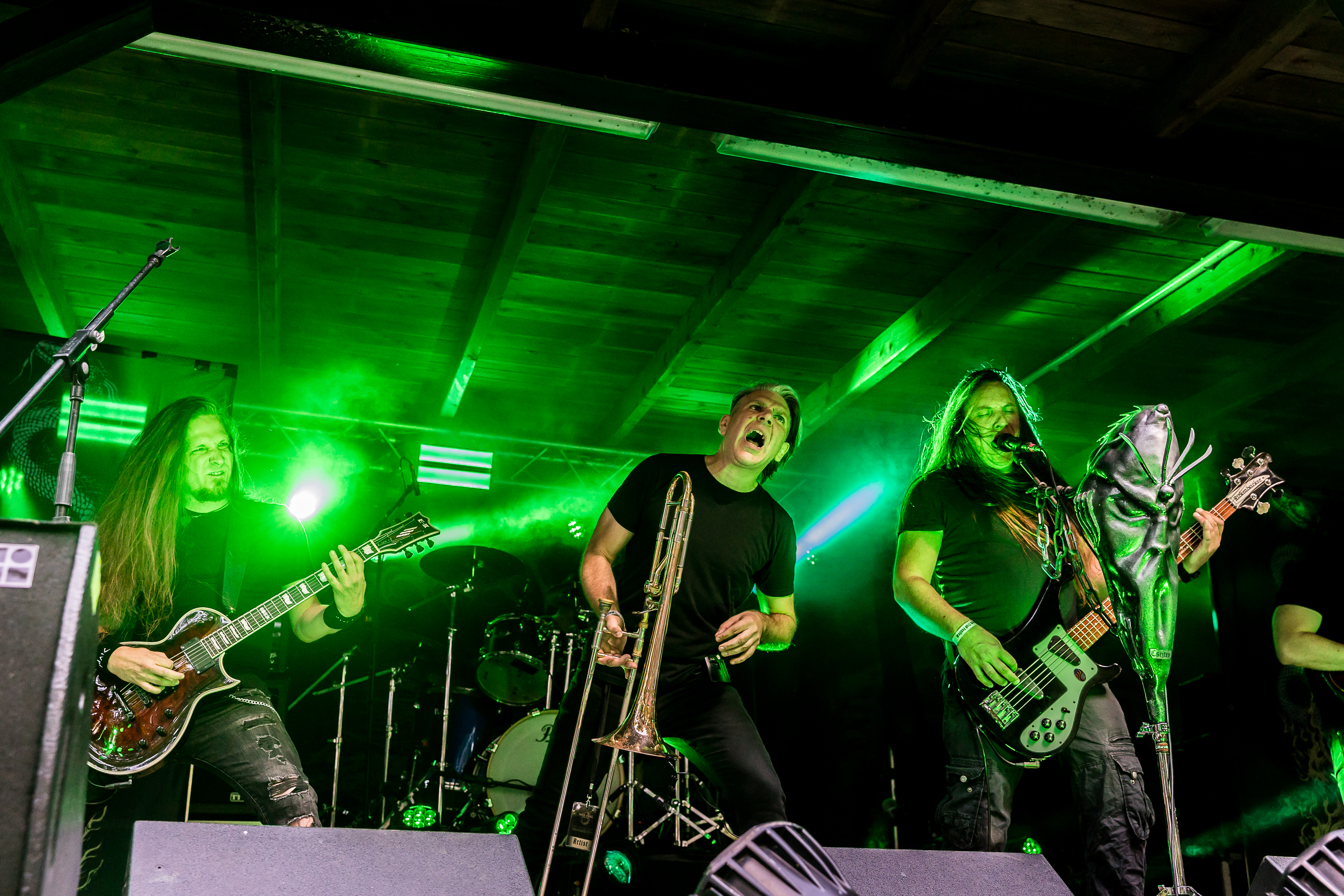
- Sear Bliss at the Dark Troll festival 2025 in Germany.

Background information
- Origin: Szombathely, Hungary
- Genre: Atmospheric black metal
- Years active: 1993–present
- Labels: Candlelight Records, Nephilim Records, Red Stream, Mascot Records, Vic Records
- Members: András Nagy; Márton Kertész; Gyula Csejtei; Zoltán Pál; Zoltán Vigh
- Past members: See below
- Website: Official website

Sear Bliss is a Hungarian atmospheric black metal band from Szombathely, formed in 1993 by bassist, vocalist and now keyboardist András Nagy. Apart from usual heavy metal instruments, they play synthesizer and wind instruments like trumpet and trombone, and sometimes flute, in their songs. The Netherlands' metal magazine Aardschok named Sear Bliss debut album Phantoms "CD Of The Month". It was a first for a black metal album.

Sear Bliss' albums, released on independent record labels like Mascot Records, Red Stream, and Candlelight Records, have earned the band a reputation in the European metal underground. Sear Bliss has shared stages with Marduk, Tsatthoggua, Mortiis, Tormentor, Skyforger, Immolation and Malevolent Creation.

After four months in the studio, Sear Bliss released their sixth album on September 24, 2007. Zero Tolerance magazine named The Arcane Odyssey "Album of the Month". Kerrang, Terrorizer, Heavy Oder Was and Rock Hard magazines also praised it. The album won "Album of the Year" on the Hungarian Metal Awards in 2007.

== History ==
=== Beginnings (1993–1996) ===
András Nagy and Csaba Tóth, former bass guitarist of Hungarian death metal band Extreme Deformity, formed Sear Bliss was formed in the autumn of 1993. The first line-up featured guitarist János Barbarics and drummer Norbert Keibinger from Hungarian death metal band Animosity. Tóth left the band and Nagy took over bass. Sear Bliss added vocalist Zoltán Csejtei and guitarist Csaba Csejtei of Extreme Deformity, as well as synth player Winter and trumpeter Gergely Szűcs.

Keibinger left Sear Bliss in April 1995, when they were working on their first demo. Balázs Bertalan (Extreme Deformity) played session drums. They released their first demo, The Pagan Winter, was released in May. Mascot Records from Netherlands offered them a three-album deal. After that, trumpeter Szűcs replaced Winter on synthesizer. Winter returned to the band after a while. Zoltán Csejtei became the drummer, and Nagy sang and played bass. In August, Sear Bliss played their first show. During 1995 and 1996, they played four shows (two each year). They started recording their debut album in the beginning of 1996 in LMS Studio, Szombathely, Hungary.

Sear Bliss released their first album, Phantoms, in August 1996. Metal magazine Aardschok named it "CD Of The Month", a first for a black metal album. German and British metal magazines gave the album good reviews. Terrorizer and Rock Hard interviewed the band. The song "Aeons Of Desolation" appeared on a compilation CD of Dutch progressive rock magazine IO Pages. Mascot released The Pagan Winter demo on CD with bonus track "In The Shadow of Another World".

=== Changes (1997–1999) ===
Sear Bliss played their first European tour supporting Marduk in February–March 1997. After finishing the tour the Csejtei brothers left the band and Winter also got out soon afterwards. Recruited new members were Zoltán Schönberger on drums and Viktor "Max" Scheer on guitar, furthermore keyboards were taken over by trumpeter Szűcs. The next album had been recorded at Beaufort Studio, Netherlands, but the band was disappointed with the first version of the mix and it had to be remixed.

The Haunting (1998) became a more atmospheric and varied album in contrast to the fast black metal tracks of the Phantoms album. The Haunting disappointed some old fans, but it appealed to new enquirers. The opportunity to tour for three weeks with the Norwegian melodic black metal band Ancient and promote the new album in Europe had come to nothing because of the private activities of Sear Bliss members in school and job. However, they celebrate their 5th anniversary with a birthday party in Budapest.

By releasing The Haunted album Sear Bliss fulfilled the Mascot contract, so a new label needed to be found. To support the search they recorded a 4-song promo CD in March 1999. But other member changes followed. Previously they parted with guitarist Viktor Scheer, then founding member/guitarist Barbarics and long-time trumpeter/keyboardist Szűcs quit due to personal conflicts within the band. In that time Sear Bliss played live with fill-in musicians, and only founding member Andras Nagy and drummer Schönberger were officially in the band. A new guitarist Andras Horváth P. would join Sear Bliss soon.

=== New era (2000–2005) ===
In the beginning of the year 2000 Sear Bliss recorded two brand new songs in their hometown Szombathely, but the studio work of the third full-length album started only at the end of the year, featuring new members like István Neubrandt on guitar and Zoltán Pál on trombone. The album Grand Destiny (2001) was released by a new Hungarian metal label called Nephilim. Before the release, Horvath P. had left the band and former Sear Bliss guitarist Csaba Csejtei got back. Later Olivér Ziskó from Cavum became the new keyboardist.

Thanks to the warm welcome that Grand Destiny received abroad, Sear Bliss started negotiations concerning a new contract with foreign recording companies again. Eventually Red Stream, the overseas distributor of previous Sear Bliss albums, offered a three-album record deal to the band. Firstly, they released Grand Destiny in the States (one year later than the original release), but the band was already working on new songs. After a spring recording session the fourth Sear Bliss album, Forsaken Symphony, with which the band returned to a rawer and more intense black metal, got released in October 2002. The new album was made available for the first time outside the US and Western Europe, and reached new audiences in Russia and the Baltic states.

The band played on Brutal Assault festival again and did a club tour in Europe accompanied by Skyforger. Sear Bliss toured in Benelux as a headliner for the first time in March 2003. They supported Marduk, Immolation and Malevolent Creation in Budapest in April. Following the concert season the band started to work on the next album at HSB studio with former Sear Bliss guitarist Viktor "Max" Scheer as producer/engineer.

On February 22, 2004, Sear Bliss celebrated their 10th anniversary in Budapest where former members joined the band on stage for a one-off show. A video was shot of the event and appeared on the Decade of Perdition DVD along with a documentary of the 10 years of Sear Bliss story.

In August the new album, Glory and Perdition was released, featuring Mayhem and Tormentor vocalist Attila Csihar in two songs ("Birth of Eternity" and "Shores of Death"). Sear Bliss shot the first promo video in their career for the song "Two Worlds Collide" from their critically acclaimed fifth full-length.

=== Recent years (2006–present) ===
Despite the success of the latest album, Csejtei left the band again and was replaced by Péter Kovács. However, the greatest news of the year 2006 was that Sear Bliss signed to Candlelight Records, the home of bands such as Emperor and 1349. Another contract was signed with Dutch Vic Records for releasing remastered editions of the first three Sear Bliss albums (The Pagan Winter, Phantoms, The Haunting) with bonus tracks. Additionally, certain parts of The Haunting album were re-recorded.

Supervised by producer Viktor Scheer the band, for the first time as a Candlelight artist, had been working on the sixth full-length since March 2007. After four months of studio work, the longest session ever in their career, the latest Sear Bliss album was released on September 24, 2007. Critically acclaimed The Arcane Odyssey was awarded "Album of the Month" by some magazines (i.e. Zero Tolerance) and was also high ranked by Kerrang, Terrorizer, Heavy Oder Was and Rock Hard magazines in Europe. The album was elected for "Album of the Year" on the Hungarian Metal Awards in 2007.

The main event for the band in 2008 was their 15th birthday show in November in Avalon Club, Budapest, where the original Sear Bliss line-up including Csejtei brothers, Winter and Gergely Szűcs played together again after 11 years. A few weeks before the concert guitarist Péter Kovács had left Sear Bliss and Attila Kovács joined from Hungarian experimental death metal band Watch My Dying.

In 2009 Vic Records has re-released Glory and Perdition and Forsaken Symphony for Europe because the original Red Stream releases were hardly available there. Forsaken Symphony is remastered by Swedish death metal fame Dan Swanö.

At the end of August Andras Nagy left alone in the band. The other four members had decided that they would form a new band called I Divine. Nagy recruited a new line-up from former Sear Bliss musicians. Guitarists Csaba Csejtei and János Barbarics joined again the band as well as Oliver Zisko on drums. In December they found a trumpeter, Balázs Bruszel.

Recordings of the seventh Sear Bliss album began on July 21, 2011. After two months work on the new album was completed. Eternal Recurrence contains progressive, experimental black metal and was released by Candlelight Records in 2012 January.

== Members ==
=== Current members ===
- András Nagy – Bass-guitar, Guitars, Percussion (bangdrum), Synthesizers, Vocals, Lyrics (1993–present)
- Gyula Csejtei – drums (2013–present)
- Zoltán Pál – trombone (2000–2009, 2013–present)
- Márton Kertész – guitars (2024–present)

=== Former members ===
- Csaba Tóth – bass (1993)
- Norbert Keibinger – drums (1993–1994)
- Zoltán Csejtei – vocals (1994–1995), drums (1995–1997)
- Winter – keyboards (1994–1995, 1995–1997)
- Gergely Szücs – trumpet (1994–1999), keyboards (1995, 1997–1999)
- Viktor "Max" Scheer – guitars (1997–1999)
- András Horváth P. – guitars (1999–2000)
- Péter Kovács – guitars (2006–2008)
- István Neubrandt – guitars (2000–2009)
- Zoltán Schönberger – drums (1997–2009)
- Balázs Bruszel – trumpet, keyboards (2009–2013)
- Csaba Csejtei – guitars (1994–1997, 2001–2006, 2009–2013)
- Olivér Ziskó – drums (2009–2013), keyboards (2001–2002)
- János Barbarics - guitars (1993-1999, 2009-2016)
- Attila Kovács – Guitars, 8-string bass, add. keyboards (2008–2009, 2016–2022)
- Zoltán Vigh – guitars (2013–2025)

=== Session musicians ===
- Balázs Bertalan (Extreme Deformity) – drums on The Pagan Winter demo (1995)
- Attila Török (Amon Hen) – keyboards on stage (1999)
- Péter Bokros – keyboards on stage (1999)
- Róbert Pintér – trumpet on stage (1999)
- Krisztián Varga – guitars on stage (2001)
- Attila Csihar – guest vocals on album Glory and Perdition (2004)

== Discography ==
Title	Type	Date of release	Label
The Pagan Winter	demo	May, 1995	self-released
Phantoms	album	August, 1996	Mascot/Two Moons
The Haunting	album	February, 1998	Mascot/Two Moons
Grand Destiny	album	April, 2001	Nephilim Records
Forsaken Symphony	album	October, 2002	Red Stream
Glory and Perdition	album	August, 2004	Red Stream
Decade of Perdition	live DVD	May, 2005	Red Stream
The Arcane Odyssey	album	September 24, 2007	Candlelight Records
Eternal Recurrence	album	January 23, 2012	Candlelight Records
Letters from the Edge	album	July 6, 2018	Hammerheart Records
Heavenly Down	album	June 28, 2024	Hammerheart Records
