= Fire Walk with Us! =

Album of Aborym in 2001

Studio album by Aborym
- Released: 15 January 2001
- Recorded: Temple of Noise Studios, Rome, January–May 2000
- Genre: Industrial black metal
- Length: 51:25
- Label: Scarlet Records
- Producers: Attila Csihar, Christian Ice

Aborym chronology
Kali Yuga Bizarre (1999)	Fire Walk with Us! (2001)	With No Human Intervention (2003)

Professional ratings
Review scores
Source	Rating
Allmusic	3/5 stars

Fire Walk with Us! is the second studio album by the Italian industrial black metal band Aborym. It is Aborym's first album with the Mayhem vocalist Attila Csihar as a full-time member. Fire Walk with Us! includes a cover version of Burzum's Norwegian language "Det som en gang var", in which bass guitarist Malfeitor Fabban performs vocals.

Vampster's reviewer found the inclusion of the Burzum cover to be "disastrous".

== Track list ==
All lyrics are written by Aborym, except track #8 by Burzum.

No.	Title	Music	Length
1.	"Our Sentence"	Aborym	6:40
2.	"Love the Death as the Life"	Aborym	6:06
3.	"White Space"	Aborym	4:11
4.	"Fire Walk with Us!"	Aborym	6:56
5.	"Here Is No God S.T.A."	Aborym	4:14
6.	"Total Black"	Aborym	4:42
7.	"Sol Sigillum" (instrumental)	Aborym	3:47
8.	"Det som en gang var" (Burzum cover)	Varg Vikernes	9:13
9.	"Theta Paranoia"	Aborym	5:36
Total length:			51:25

== Personnel ==
- Attila Csihar – vocals
- Malfeitor Fabban – bass guitar, keyboard, synthesizer and sampling, backing vocals
- Nysrok – lead guitar, sampling, backing vocals
- Set Teitan – rhythm guitar, sampling
