= Sakis =

Sakis is a Greek male given name, a diminutive form of names where the last consonant (consonant preceding the final "S" common in the majority of Greek masculine nouns) is "S", most commonly Athanasius or Anastasius, with the addition of the "akis" suffix, meaning little. It may refer to:

- Sakis Arnaoutoglou (born 1971), a Greek politician
- Sakis Kouvas (born 1946), a Greek former forward footballer
- Sakis Rouvas (born 1972), a Greek pop and rock musician, actor, television presenter, fashion designer, businessman, humanitarian, model, and former pole vaulter
- Sakis Tolis (born 1972), a Greek musician, vocalist/guitarist of Rotting Christ
- Sakis Tsiolis (born 1959), a former Greek football player and current manager
- Dionysios "Sakis" Matsikas, a Greek manufacturer of bouzoukis, guitars and mandolins. Some of these are sold under the brand name Sakis.

== See also ==
- Sakis, a plural alternative for the Saki monkey, rather than "Saki monkeys"
