= Burial Chamber Trio =

Drone metal band

- Origin: International
- Genres: Drone metal
- Labels: Southern Lord
- Members: Greg Anderson; Attila Csihar; Oren Ambarchi

Burial Chamber Trio is a drone metal band consisting of American guitarist/bassist Greg Anderson, Hungarian vocalist Attila Csihar and Australian multi-instrumentalist Oren Ambarchi. These three musicians are also performing with Sunn O))).

The band is not to be confused with Gravetemple, which features the same lineup except Greg Anderson; instead, Sunn O)))'s other guitarist, Stephen O'Malley, is in the band.

Burial Chamber released their vinyl-only self-titled album Burial Chamber Trio. A 10-inch picture disc EP, WVRM (from a live performance), was also released through Southern Lord Records.

== Discography ==
- Burial Chamber Trio (full-length, 2007)
- WVRM (live EP, 2007) Limited to 3,000 copies.
