= Attila Csihar =

Hungarian metal vocalist (born 1971)

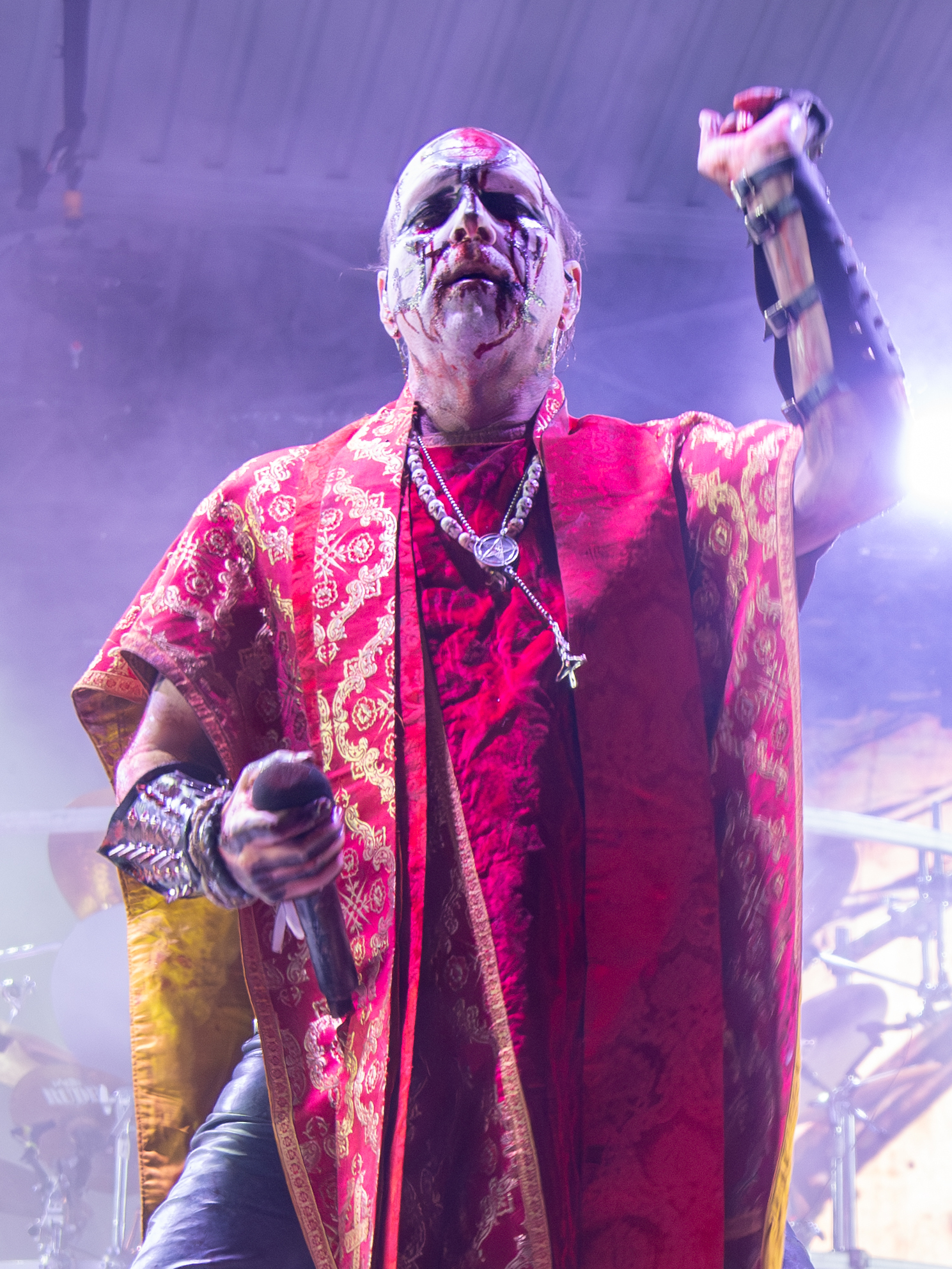
- Csihar performing with Mayhem in 2024

Background information
- Also known as: Void ov Voices
- Born: Attila Gábor Csihar; 29 March 1971 (age 55)
- Origin: Budapest, Hungary
- Genres: Black metal; drone metal
- Occupation: Vocalist
- Years active: 1985–present
- Member of: Mayhem; Burial Chamber Trio; Gravetemple; Plasma Pool; Sinsaenum; Tormentor
- Formerly of: Aborym; Sunn O)))

Attila Gábor Csihar (Hungarian: [ˈɒtillɒ ˈt͡ʃihɒr]; born 29 March 1971), also sometimes known as Void, is a Hungarian extreme metal vocalist, best known for his vocal work in Norwegian black metal band Mayhem and American drone metal band Sunn O))). Author Ian Christe describes his vocals as "operatic".

== Biography ==
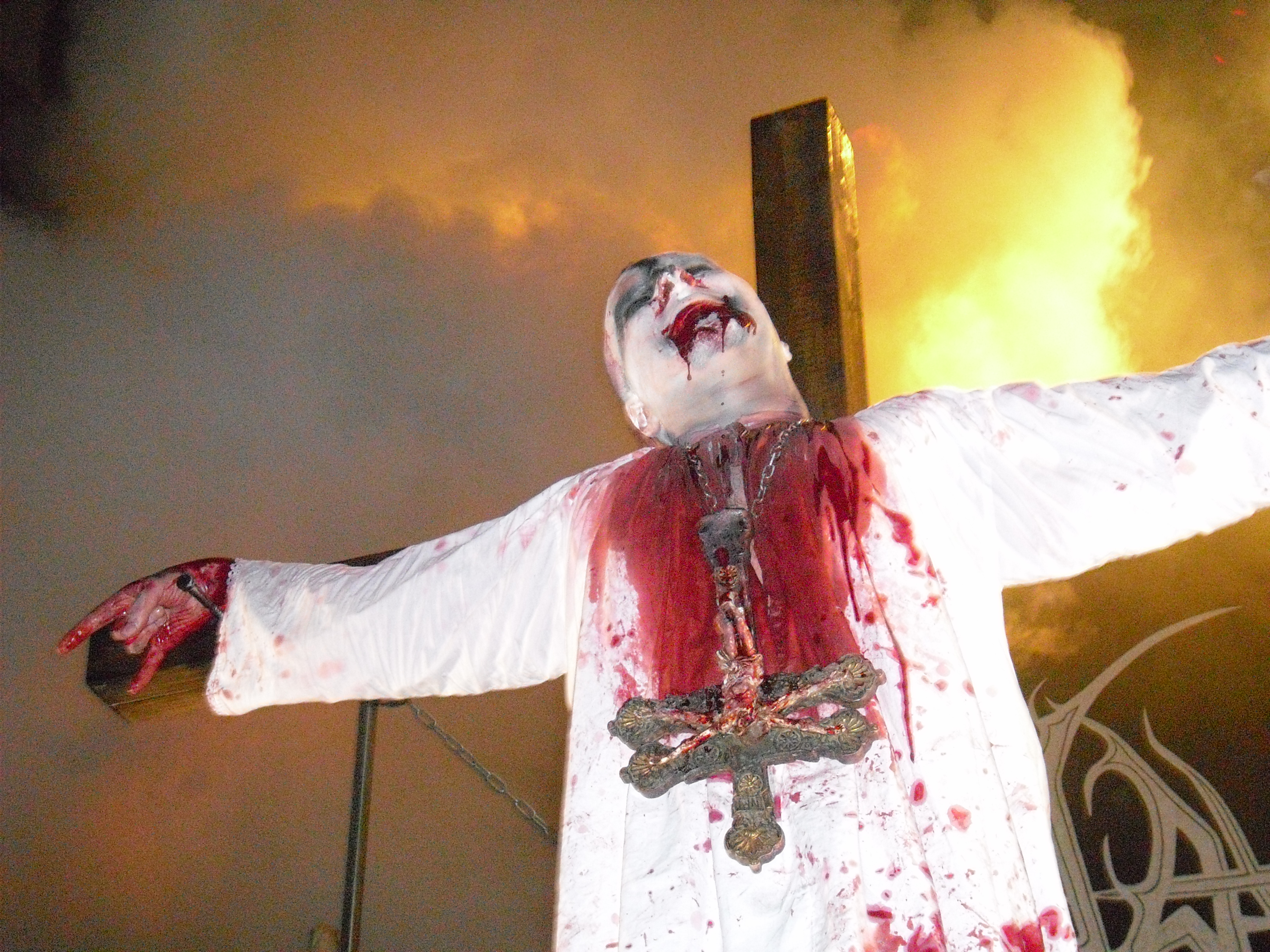
Csihar performing with Mayhem at Inferno Metal Festival in 2010

His music career began in 1985 with the Hungarian metal band Tormentor, which reached cult status in black metal circles with their first album, Anno Domini (1988). Tormentor performed 50-100 live shows between 1986 and 1990. After Tormentor he started his dark electro industrial band Plasma Pool (1990–1994). On the strength of his work in Tormentor, he was invited to perform vocals on the De Mysteriis Dom Sathanas album by Norwegian black metal band Mayhem after lead singer Dead committed suicide. Ultimately Csihar did not perform any live concerts with the band until his second tenure in 2004.

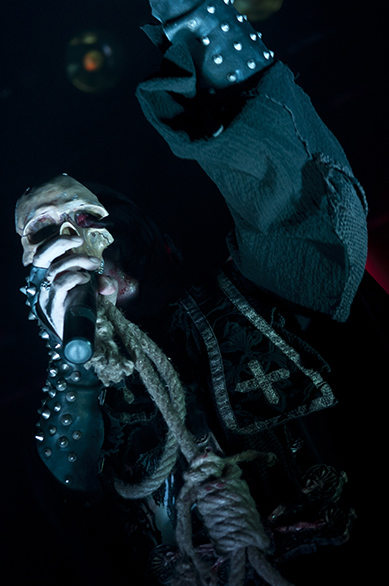
Csihar with Mayhem at Hole in the Sky 2011

After Mayhem, Csihar continued to work in various bands, such as Plasma Pool, Aborym, and Korog; he also performed as Caiaphas in the rock opera Jesus Christ Superstar in Hungary. He stated during an interview for Hungarian Metal Hammer that he felt honoured to sing "This Jesus Must Die". He performed in Keep of Kalessin as well on their returning EP Reclaim together with drummer Frost from Satyricon.

He is a session member of the American doom/drone metal band Sunn O))). His first live performance with the band happened on 24 March 2003 at Stadtwerkstatt in Linz, Austria. His first recorded collaboration with the band was in 2004 when he sang in the Sanskrit language on the tracks "Decay2 [Nihil's Maw]" and "Decay (The Symptoms of Kali Yuga)" on their album White2. Csihar has performed on five full-length albums with the group, including the acclaimed successful Monoliths & Dimensions, and performed live with the band hundreds of times around the world.

In 2004, Csihar rejoined Mayhem after the departure of Maniac, the band's previous vocalist. Their 2007 album, Ordo ad Chao, won the Spellemannprisen (also known as the Norwegian Grammy). Since then the band has embarked upon intense international touring.

In 2008 he joined another project, Gravetemple, alongside Stephen O'Malley of Sunn O))) and Oren Ambarchi.

Csihar started his solo act in November 2008, called Void ov Voices. His live performances have been in support of artists like Ulver on their first European tour, Bohren & der Club of Gore, Lustmord, Ruin and Diamanda Galas. He performed at "The Grand Reincarnation" Of Paul Booth's Last Rites Gallery & Tattoo Theatre. He also toured in Japan and performed in Australia for the Dark Mofo festival in Hobart, Tasmania.

He has collaborated with artists such as Current 93, Jarboe, Dissection, Emperor, Taake, Ulver, and Banks Violette.

Between 2016 and 2018, Csihar joined blackened death metal supergroup Sinsaenum. He would perform lead vocals alongside Sean Zatorsky of Dååth, with ex-DragonForce bassist and group founder Frédéric Leclercq and Loudblast guitarist Stéphane Buriez on guitars, Seth Heimoth on bass, and former Slipknot drummer Joey Jordison on drums. The band released its debut album Echoes of the Tortured on 29 July 2016 via earMUSIC.

In 2019 he formed Hiedelem, a noise project with drummer/percussionist Balázs Pándi (Merzbow, Keiji Haino).

In 2019 he participated in the live presentation of the album Canticles of the Holy Scythe by Lüüp, accompanied by a chamber orchestra of 14 musicians.

Outside of music, Csihar graduated as an electrical engineer from a technical college, and used to be a private math and physics teacher.

He worked in film production, most notably on Tony Scott's Spy Game, where he was the first assistant of production designer Norris Spencer. In 2018, Csihar was portrayed by his son Arion in the film Lords of Chaos, which depicted the early 1990s Norwegian black metal scene, particularly Mayhem.

Although Mayhem have often displayed dead animals and blood at their live events, Csihar is a vegan in his personal life.

== Discography ==
=== Tormentor ===
- The Seventh Day of Doom (1987)
- Anno Domini (1988)
- Recipe Ferrum! (1999)

=== Mayhem ===
- De Mysteriis Dom Sathanas (1994)
- Ordo Ad Chao (2007)
- Esoteric Warfare (2014)
- De Mysteriis Dom Sathanas Alive (2017)
- Daemon (2019)
- Liturgy of Death (2026)

=== Plasma Pool ===
- I (1991–1994)
- II – Drowning (1991–1993)
- III – Sinking (unreleased album)

=== Aborym ===
- Kali Yuga Bizarre (1998, guest performance)
- Fire Walk with Us! (2000)
- With No Human Intervention (2003)
- Generator (guest vocals on "Man Bites God", 2006)

=== Limbonic Art ===
- The Ultimate Death Worship (guest vocals on "From the Shades of Hatred", 2001)

=== Korog ===
- Korog (2005)

=== Attila Csihar ===
- The Beast of Attila Csihar (2003, compilation album)

=== Void ov Voices ===
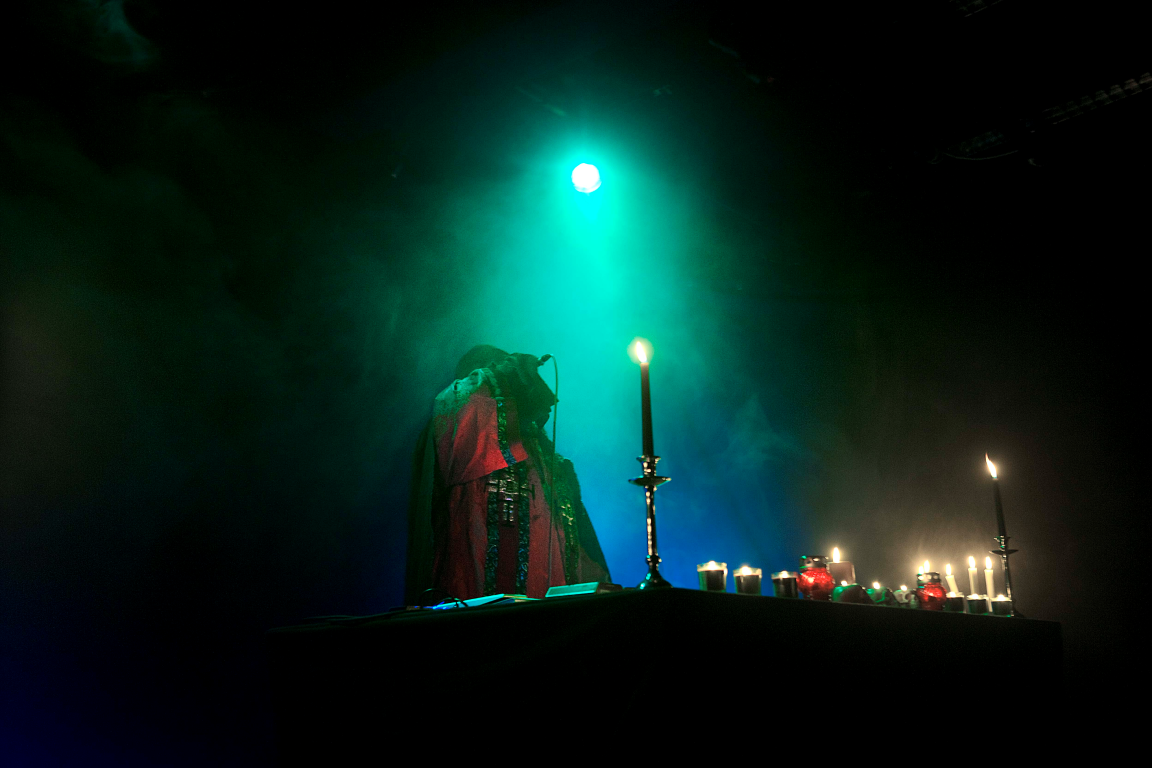
Void ov Voices live in Malmö, 2011

- 777 (2012, live album, Japan Tour exclusive)

=== Anaal Nathrakh ===
- When Fire Rains Down from the Sky, Mankind Will Reap As It Has Sown (guest vocals on "Atavism", 2003)
- Eschaton (guest vocals on "Regression to the Mean", 2006)

=== Keep of Kalessin ===
- Reclaim (2003)

=== Emperor ===
- Scattered Ashes (guest vocals on "Funeral Fog", Mayhem cover, 2003)

=== Sear Bliss ===
- Glory and Perdition (additional vocals in "Birth of Eternity" and "Shores of Death", 2003)

=== Sunn O))) ===
- White2 (2004)
- Oracle (2007)
- Dømkirke (2008)
- Monoliths & Dimensions (2009)
- Terrestrials (album) (2014)
- Kannon (2015)

=== Astarte ===
- Demonized (guest vocals on "Lycon", 2007)

=== Burial Chamber Trio ===
- Burial Chamber Trio (2007)

=== Grave Temple ===
- The Holy Down (2007?)
- Ambient/Ruin (2008)
- Impassable Fears (2017)

=== YcosaHateRon ===
- La Nuit (2007)

=== Stephen O'Malley ===
- 6°Fskyquake (2008)

=== Jarboe ===
- Mahakali (guest vocals on "The Soul Continues", 2008)

=== Skitliv ===
- Skandinavisk Misantropi (additional vocals on "ScumDrug", 2009)

=== Nader Sadek ===
- In the Flesh (guest vocals on two tracks, 2010)

=== Ulver ===
- Wars of the Roses (guest vocals on "Providence", 2010)

=== DivahaR ===
- Divarise (guest vocals on "Blindness") 2014

Divahar is an all-female symphonic black metal band from Yerevan, Armenia that contains Dev on vocals and guitar, Urubani on guitar, Skadi on bass, and Belus on keyboards.

=== Alien Vampires ===
- Drag You to Hell (guest vocals on "The Divinity Of Solitude") 2015

=== Sinsaenum ===
- Echoes of the Tortured (2016)
- Ashes (2017)
- Repulsion for Humanity (2018)

=== Statiqbloom ===
- Beneath the Whelm (guest vocals on "The Second Coming") 2020

=== The Mugshots ===
- Children of the Night / The Call (guest vocals on "The Call") 2021
