= Tormentor (band) =

Hungarian black metal band

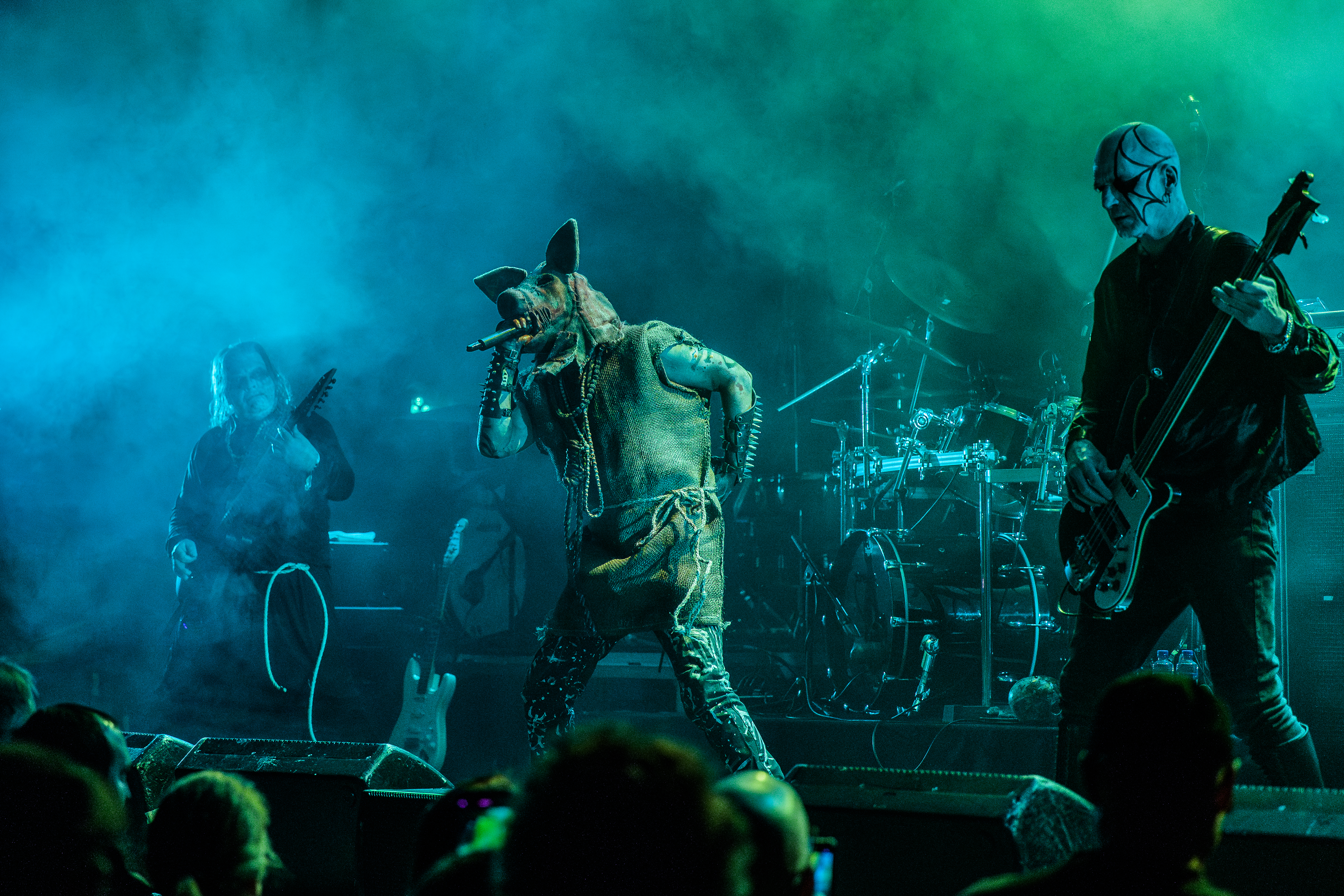
- Tormentor in 2026

Background information
- Origin: Budapest, Hungary
- Genre: Black metal
- Years active: 1985-Present
- Members: Attila Csihar; Attila Szigeti; Machat St. Zsoltar; György Farkas
- Past members: Mugambi Zoldun; Zeno Galoca; Márton Dubecz; Tamás Buday
- Website: tormentor.hu

Tormentor is a Hungarian black metal band formed in 1986 in Budapest. They recorded their first album, Anno Domini, in 1988, but were unable to release it until the end of communist rule in Hungary. The album reached Norway through the tape-trading community.

== History ==
Following the suicide of Per Ohlin, Mayhem invited Attila Csihar from Tormentor to join the band; he was to perform the vocals on De Mysteriis Dom Sathanas. Tormentor split up in 1991. After a long break they reformed and released the more experimental Recipe Ferrum through Avantgarde Music in 2001, going on a long indefinite hiatus afterwards.

=== Reunion ===
In 2017, Tormentor reunited after several years to re-emerge on the stage for a highly publicized reunion show on 21 April 2018, in Budapest, followed by an appearance at the Brutal Assault in Josefov, Czech Republic and the Beyond the Gates festival in Bergen, Norway, with later performances at festivals in France and Canada to cap off the year.

The band reunited in the classic lineup from 1988 with Csihar on vocals, Tamás Buday and Attila Szigeti sharing guitar duties, György Farkas handling bass guitar, and Machat St. Zsoltar on drums. The band's own recording imprint, Saturnus Productions, has also reissued both the cult classic debut album Anno Domini and The Seventh Day of Doom demo on CD and vinyl.

== Musical style ==
J. Andrew of Metal Injection wrote: "When you consider most of the metal that was prominent in 1989 and Tormentor's relative isolation in Hungary, it's incredible that Anno Domini turned out the way it did. It's a testament to the vibrant tape-trading network that it managed to reach across and back over the Iron Curtain with this album."

== Band members ==
=== Current line-up ===
- Attila Csihar – vocals (1985–1991, 1999–?, 2017–present), guitars (1989)
- Attila Szigeti – guitars (1985–1991, 2017–present), keyboards (1989)
- György Farkas – bass guitar (1987–1991, 2017–present)
- Machat St. Zsoltar Motolla – drums (1988–1991, 1999–?, 2017-present), keyboards (2000)

=== Former members ===
- Lajos Fazekas– bass guitar (1985–1987)
- Márton Dubecz – drums (1985–1987)
- Mugambi Zolduns Bwana – lead guitar (1999–?)
- Zénó Galóca – bass guitar (1999–?)
- Tamás Buday – guitars (1985–1988, 2017–2020)

=== Live members ===
- Charles Hedger – guitar (2020–present)

== Discography ==
=== Studio Albums ===
- Anno Domini (1989) (recorded 1988)

=== Others ===
- The 7th Day of the Doom (demo, 1987)
- Black and Speed Metál (split, 1989)
- The Sick Years (compilation, 1998)
- Live in Hell (live, 1999)
- Live in Damnation (EP 2000)
- The Beast of Attila Csihar (compilation, 2003)
- The Tyrant of Transylvania (EP, 2008)
- Anno Daemoni (DVD, 2019)
- Covid WitchFuck (live, 2020)
