= Carnage =

Carnage is a synonym for a massacre, meaning the killing of a large number of people.

Carnage may also refer to:

== Film ==
- Carnage (2002 film), a French film
- Carnage (2011 film), directed by Roman Polanski
- Carnage (2017 film), directed by Simon Amstell
- A Bay of Blood, a 1971 Mario Bava horror film titled Carnage in the United States
- Venom: Let There Be Carnage, a 2021 American superhero film

== Television ==
=== Episodes ===
- "Carnage", a 1984 episode of Armored Trooper VOTOMS
- "Carnage", episode four of Liaison, 2023
- "Carnage", a 2020 episode of Mountain Men
- "Carnage", a 1996 episode of Spider-Man: The Animated Series, "Chapter XI" of The Sins of the Fathers
- "Carnage", a 2013 episode of Ultimate Spider-Man

=== Shows ===
- Crash (also known as Carnage), a 1998 television show, about automotive safety

== Music ==
- Carnage (band), a Swedish death metal band
- Carnage (Lair of the Minotaur album), a 2004 album by Lair of the Minotaur
- Carnage (Nick Cave and Warren Ellis album), a 2021 album by Nick Cave and Warren Ellis

== People ==
- Sean Carnage, film director and producer
- Carnage the Executioner (born 1974), Twin Cities-based Minnesota rapper
- Carnage (born 1991), the former stage name of American DJ and record producer Gordo
- Nathan "Carnage" Corbett (born 1979), 11-time Muay Thai World Champion.

== Other uses ==
- Carnage (character), a Marvel Comics supervillain
- The Carnage Crew, a professional wrestling tag team
- Gori: Cuddly Carnage, an upcoming 2023 video game
- Carnage UK, an organisation that arranges student parties throughout the UK
- Carnage Gaming Convention, held in early November in Vermont
- Carnage Middle School, a middle school in downtown Raleigh, NC
