= Frederick Brook Hitch =

British sculptor (1897–1957)

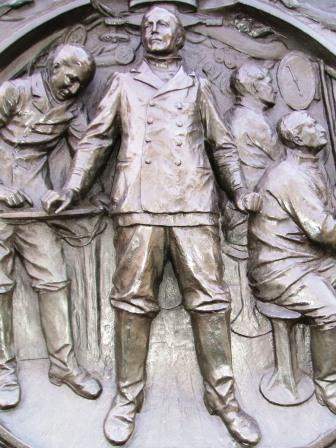
- The central relief on the National Submarine War Memorial
- Born: 1877; London, England
- Died: 1957 (aged 79–80)
- Education: Royal Academy
- Known for: Sculpture
- Notable work: War memorials/public monuments

Frederick Brook Hitch (1897–1957) was a British sculptor, the son of the architectural sculptor Nathaniel Hitch. He attended the Royal Academy Schools and was a Fellow of the Royal Society of British Sculptors. He lived in Hertford, Hertfordshire, England.

== Works ==
=== Church and other architectural sculpture ===
Place	Location	Notes and References
St Andrew's Church	Bramfield, Suffolk	For St Andrew's Church Brook Hitch carved a reredos. This was funded by Harriet Helen Tatlock of Bramfield Hall in memory of her parents and grandparents; her maternal grandfather was the painter Peter De Wint.
St David's Cathedral	Pembrokeshire	In around 1931 Brook Hitch carved a hanging rood for the cathedral with Mary, John and the symbols of the Four Evangelists on the arms of the cross and with halos and symbols highlighted in gold. The designer was William Douglas Caröe. For the same cathedral Brooke Hitch created Bishop John Owen's effigy in about 1926. and the carving of the tomb and effigy of the Countess of Maidstone executed in about 1932.
University College of South Wales and Monmouthshire	Cardiff	Brook Hitch carved several reliefs for the University College of South Wales and Monmouthshire (now the Main Building of Cardiff University) in Cathays Park, Cardiff. He also carved two female figures representing Science and Labour in the central frieze above the building's main entrance.

=== Church and other architectural sculpture ===
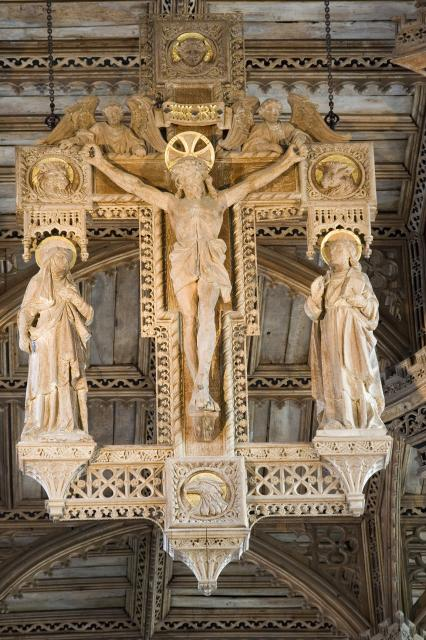
Hanging Rood in St David's Cathedral. Photograph shown courtesy Martin Crampin.

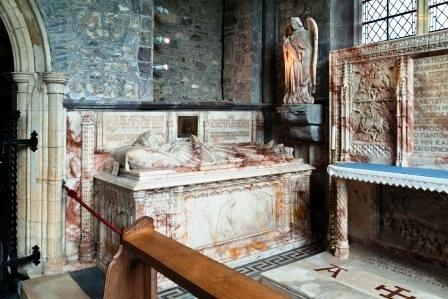
The Countess of Maidstone's Tomb. Photograph shown courtesy Martin Crampin.

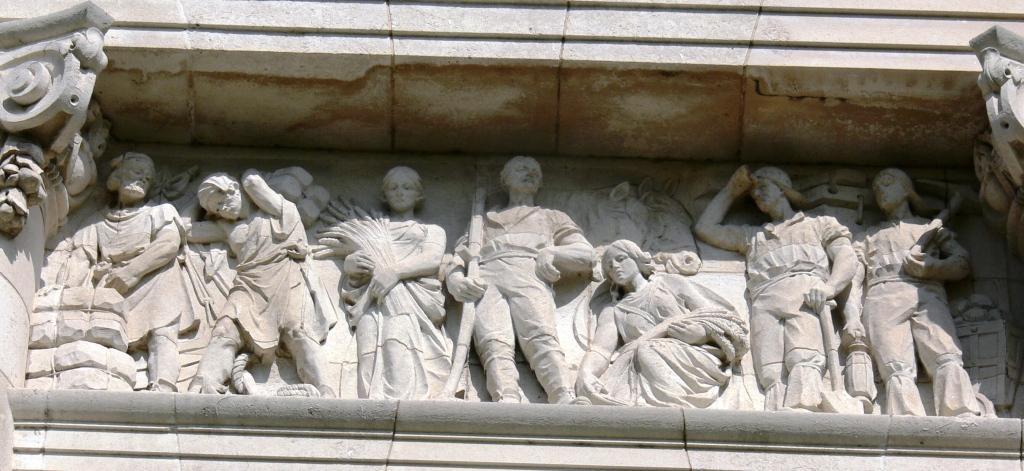
The Labours – relief by Brook Hitch on the façade of the Main Building of Cardiff University. Photograph shown courtesy Jessica Kelly.

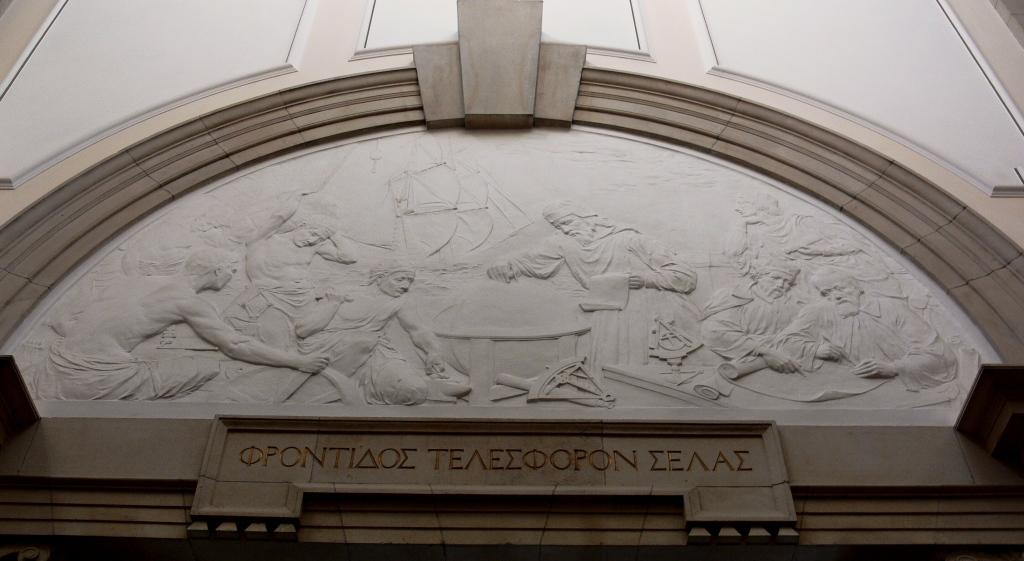
Frieze by the Grand Staircase in the Main Building of Cardiff University. Photograph shown courtesy Jessica Kelly.

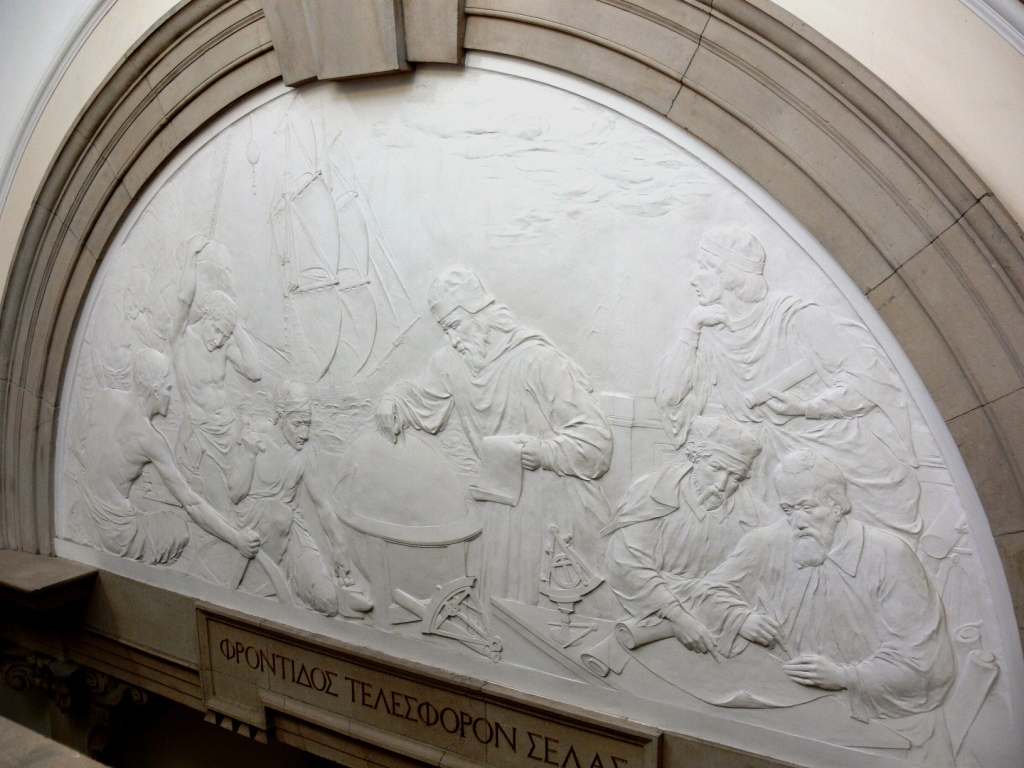
Frieze by the Grand Staircase in the Main Building of Cardiff University. Photograph shown courtesy Jessica Kelly.

== War memorials ==
Place	Location	Notes and References
St Michael and All Angels Church	Pirbright, Surrey	Brook Hitch carved a calvary war memorial that stands in the churchyard. It was unveiled on 13 August 1920 by John Randolph, the Bishop of Guildford.
St Mary the Virgin Church	Shotley Suffolk	Hitch collaborated on creating a free standing memorial for the church of St Mary the Virgin in Shotley, Suffolk, working with the architect A. H. Ryan-Tenison. The memorial, centered in an area that is entered through a lychgate, is formed of a two-stepped base surmounted by a plinth and capped column. At the four corners of the base are cast bronze dolphins. A bronze figure of the Madonna is placed against one side of the column. A bronze lion head is placed on each of the posts that have been placed around the edge of the paved area. Bronze panels are on each face of the column. Two of the panels depict an anchor within a wreath, another depicts a Viking ship and the fourth a medieval ship. The plaque on the Lychgate is inscribed: "TO THE GLORY/OF GOD AND/IN MEMORY OF/THE OFFICERS AND MEN/OF THE 8TH AND 9TH/SUBMARINE FLOTILLAS/WHO GAVE THEIR LIVES/FOR KING AND COUNTRY/DURING THE GREAT/WAR 1914–1919./A GOOD LIFE HATH BUT A/FEW DAYS BUT A GOOD NAME/ENDURETH FOR EVER./ECCLESIASTICUS xl1 13." On the top step of the plinth are inscribed the names of submarines: E30, E16, E34, E4/C16, E36, E50, E47 and L10. The names of the 52 men who perished in action are written on a column and on the plinth. The memorial was unveiled on 26 June 1919; Bishop Hornby gave the dedication. The architect was a cousin of one of the dead. Some of the castings were executed by men of HMS Maidstone which is mentioned on the memorial.
National Submarine War Memorial	Victoria Embankment, London	The National Submarine War Memorial is set against the wall on the Victoria Embankment in London. In the centre of the memorial is a bas-relief by Brook Hitch showing the interior of a submarine, and another has nereids swimming on either side. On the right and left are statues representing Truth and Justice. On either side of the central bronze plaques are 40 bronze wreath hooks in the form of anchors. In 1992 an additional plaque was added to commemorate the 70th anniversary of the unveiling of the original memorial. At the top of the memorial is the inscription "Erected to the memory of the officers and men of the British Navy who lost their lives serving in submarines 1914–1918 and 1939–1945". On the left-hand side is a list of the submarines lost in the 1914–1918 conflict and on the right a list of submarines lost from 1939 to 1945. The 70th Anniversary plaque reads: "National Submarine War Memorial (1922) This plaque commemorates the memorial's seventieth anniversary and the contribution by the members of the submariners old comrades, London, in their devotion to the upkeep of this memorial, unveiled by Peter P. Rigby C.B.E.J.P." The architect of the memorial was A. H. Ryan-Tenison, and the Parlanti Foundry carried out the casting. The memorial was unveiled on 15 December 1922.

=== Images of the National Submarine War Memorial ===
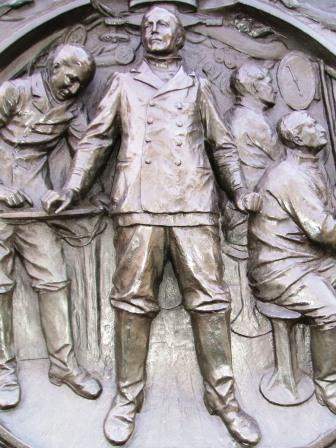
The central relief on the National Submarine War Memorial: The interior of the submarine.

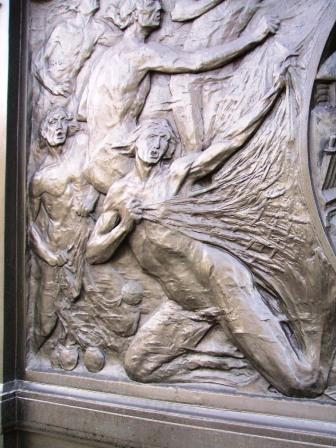
Second relief on the National Submarine War Memorial: Swimming nereids

Place	Location	Notes and References
The RSPCA Animals Memorial Dispensary	Kilburn, North West London	Brook Hitch executed a relief for the Royal Society for the Prevention of Cruelty to Animals (RSPCA) Animals Memorial Dispensary in Kilburn, North West London. The clinic was opened on 10 November 1932, although it had been treating animals for 13 months prior to that date. Brook Hitch had won a competition for the best design, this competition having been run by the RSPCA and the Royal British Society of Sculptors. The bronze relief covers every type of animal which saw action and gave service; horses, mules, oxen, dogs, elephants, camels and pigeons. The plaques record that 484,143 horses, mules, camels and bullocks were killed by enemy action, disease or accident, and that 725,216 animals were treated by the RSPCA during the First World War.

=== Images of the RSPCA Animals Memorial Dispensary ===
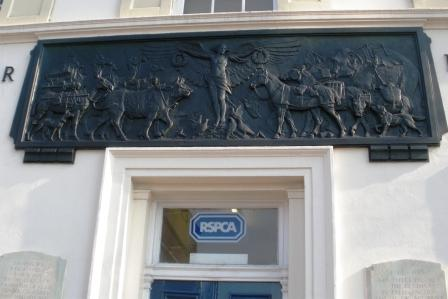
Brook Hitch's relief

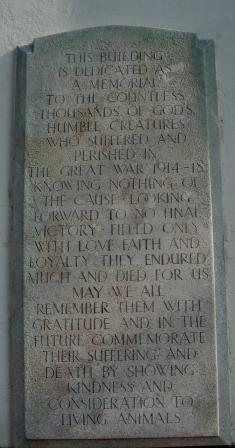
One of two plaques by the entrance to the RSPCA Animals Memorial Dispensary

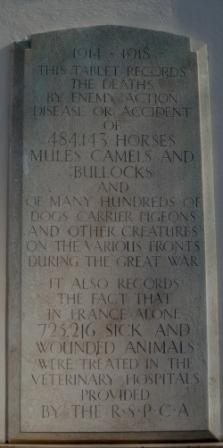
Second plaque by the Dispensary entrance

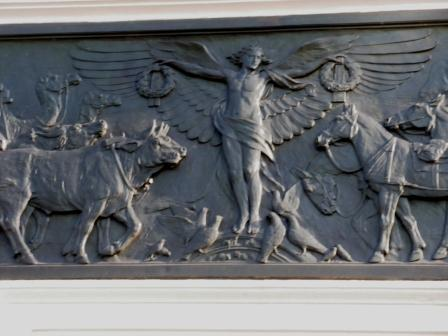
Central Part of Brook Hitch relief

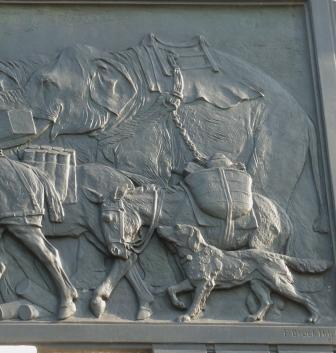
Detail from Brook Hitch relief

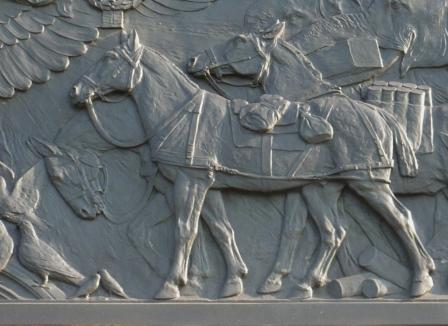
Horses in Brook Hitch relief

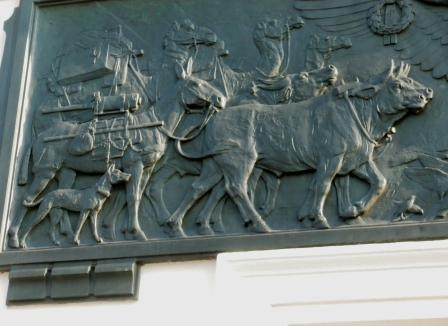
Left hand side of relief

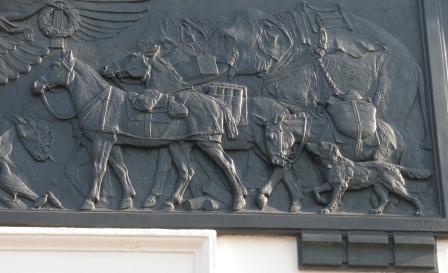
Right hand side of relief

=== Harwich Royal Navy Reserve Auxiliary Patrol and Minesweepers Memorial ===
Place	Location	Notes and References
Harwich Royal Navy Reserve Auxiliary Patrol and Minesweepers Memorial	Harwich, Essex	Brook Hitch worked on the memorial to the men of the Harwich Royal Navy Reserve Auxiliary Patrol and Minesweepers who served in the First World War. The memorial stands on Marine Parade, Upper Dovercourt. The inscription reads NORTH EAST FACE: "IHS / TO THE GLORY OF GOD/ AND IN PROUD MEMORY/ OF THE OFFICERS AND/ MEN OF THE ROYAL NAVAL/ RESERVE & ROYAL NAVAL/ VOLUNTEER RESERVE/ SERVING IN THE AUXILIARY/ PATROL & MINESWEEPERS/ AT HARWICH WHO DIED IN/ THE PERFORMANCE OF/ THEIR DUTIES THAT THE/ SEAS MIGHT BE MADE FREE/ TWILIGHT AND EVENING BELL,/ AND AFTER THAT THE DARK/ AND MAY THERE BE NO SADNESS OF FAREWELL,/ WHEN I EMBARK./ FOR THO' FROM OUT OUR BOURNE OF TIME AND PLACE/ THE FLOOD MAY BEAR ME FAR./ I HOPE TO SEE MY PILOT FACE TO FACE/ WHEN I HAVE CROSSED THE BAR./ THE BROTHER OFFICERS AND MEN OF THE HARWICH/ AUXILIARY PATROL AND MINESWEEPER SUBSCRIBED/ TO ERECT THIS MEMORIAL IN REMEMBRANCE OF THEIR/ COMRADES WHO GAVE THEIR LIVES IN THE SERVICE OF/ THEIR KING AND COUNTRY DURING THE GREAT WAR/ 1914 – 1919 / ERECTED 1919/ REAR ADMIRAL CECIL S. HICKLEY M.V.O./ CAPTAIN THOMAS J. S. LYNE R.N. D.S.O./ PORT MINESWEEPING OFFICER SOUTH EAST, SOUTH WEST AND NORTH WEST FACES:" (NAMES) 185 men are remembered and the memorial was unveiled on 16 December 1919 by Admiral Cecil Hickey with a dedication by the Bishop of London.

== Other works: public statues ==
- A statue of Captain Matthew Flinders on North Terrace, Adelaide.
- Statue of Sir Ross Smith in the Creswell Gardens, near Adelaide Oval.
- The bronze statue of the hymn-writer Charles Wesley at the Methodist chapel in Bristol. Charles Wesley (1707–1788) was the younger brother of John Wesley. He composed about 9,000 hymns during his lifetime, such as "Love Divine, All Loves Excelling" and "Hark, the Herald Angels Sing". The Brook Hitch bronze statue stands in the back courtyard of the Methodist chapel and has the motif "O let me commend my Saviour to you".
- Statue of Nelson in Portsmouth. This was erected in 1951, originally in Pembroke Gardens, Southsea, but moved to the Portsmouth Grand Parade in 2005.
- A statue of Sir Robert de Mantell in the grounds of Beeleigh Abbey in Essex. Sir Robert de Mantell was the founder of Beeleigh Abbey.

=== Other works: public statues ===
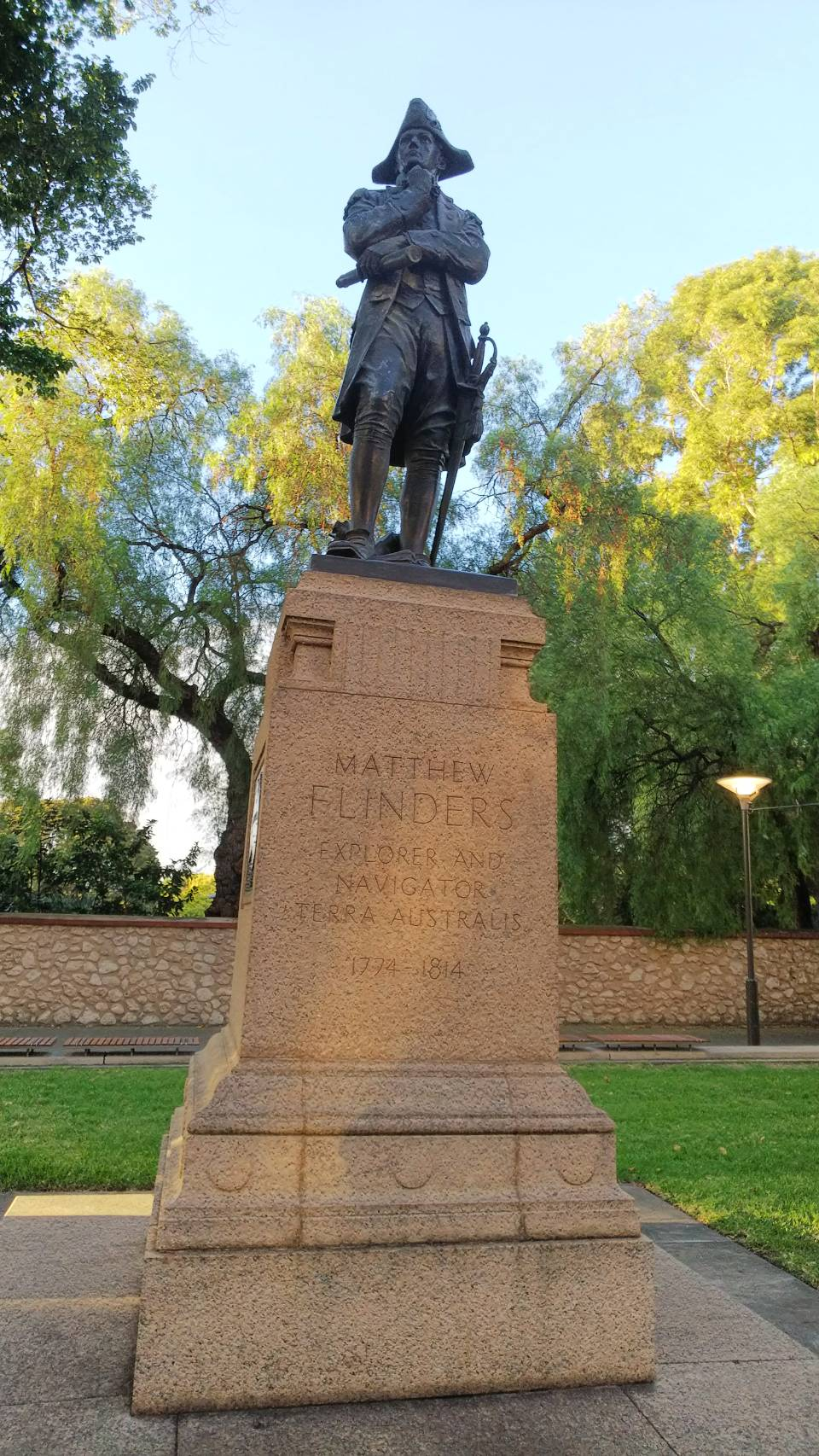
Statue of Captain Matthew Flinders in Adelaide

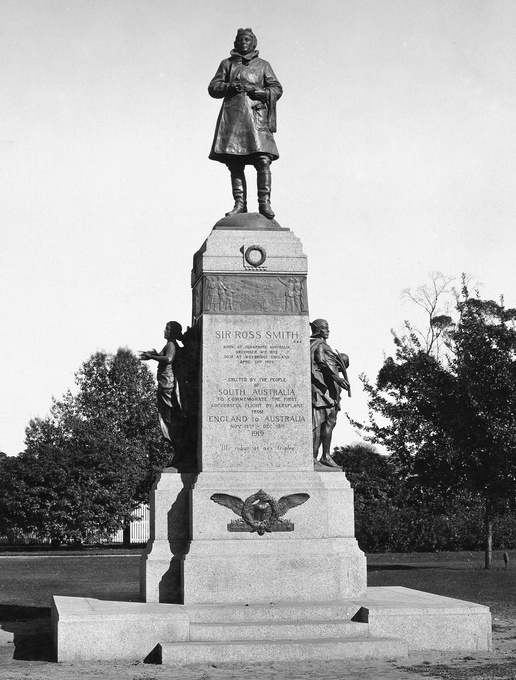
Statue of Sir Ross Smith in Adelaide

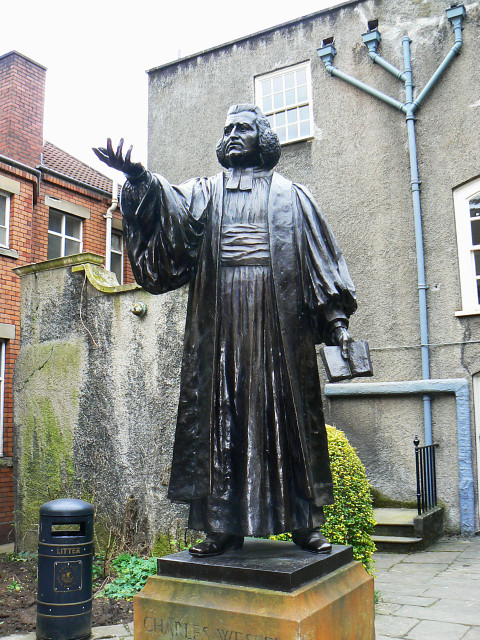
Statue of Charles Wesley in Bristol

== Exhibitions ==
Brook Hitch exhibited at the Royal Academy from 1906 to 1947. Until 1914, his exhibits were mostly classical subjects. In 1917 he showed a medal commemorating the Victory of Jutland Bank. Thereafter he exhibited portraits, with the exception of a work entitled Grief, shown in 1924. In 1926 Hitch submitted maquettes in the competition for the award of the Canadian National War Memorial in Ottawa. Although he was not awarded the commission, his design was shown at the Royal Academy in 1926.
