= National Submarine Memorial =

National Submarine Memorial may refer to:

- National Submarine War Memorial, London, England
- National Submarine Memorial - East at Groton, Connecticut, United States
- National Submarine Memorial - West at Naval Weapons Station Seal Beach, United States
