= War Metal Battle Master =

Studio album by Lair of the Minotaur
- Released: March 25, 2008
- Recorded: October 2007
- Studio: Volume Studios
- Genre: Sludge metal, thrash metal
- Length: 39:31
- Label: Southern Lord Records (SUNN91)
- Producer: Sanford Parker; Lair of the Minotaur

Lair of the Minotaur chronology
The Ultimate Destroyer (2006)	War Metal Battle Master (2008)	Evil Power (2010)

Professional ratings
Review scores
Source	Rating
AllMusic	4.5/5 stars

War Metal Battle Master is the third studio album by Chicago-based sludge/thrash metal band Lair of the Minotaur. There was a music video recorded for the title track, which was directed by Gary Smithson.

== Track listing ==
All lyrics and music written by Steven Rathbone.

No.	Title	Length
1.	"Horde of Undead Vengeance"	4:42
2.	"War Metal Battle Master"	3:28
3.	"When the Ice Giants Slayed All"	3:08
4.	"Slaughter the Bestial Legion"	5:04
5.	"Black Viper Barbarian Clan"	3:35
6.	"Assassins of the Cursed Mist"	5:18
7.	"Doomtrooper"	9:45
8.	"Hades Unleashed"	4:31
Total length:		39:31

Note

- The LP version of this album includes a bonus track at the end of side one (after Track 4), called "Terror Tyrannus".

== Personnel ==
- Steven Rathbone – vocals, guitar and mixing
- D.J. Barraca – bass
- Chris Wozniak – drums
- Steve Moore – synth on "Doomtrooper"
- Sanford Parker – nixing, executive production
- Jeremy Mohler – illustrations
- Erica Barraca – photos
- Seldon Hunt – layout
- Scott Hull – mastering
