= Evil Power =

Studio album by Lair of the Minotaur
- Released: April 13, 2010
- Recorded: January 2010
- Genre: Sludge metal, thrash metal
- Length: 30:28
- Label: The Grind-House
- Producer: Lair of the Minotaur

Lair of the Minotaur chronology
War Metal Battle Master (2008)	Evil Power (2010)

Professional ratings
Review scores
Source	Rating
AllMusic	3.5/5 stars

Evil Power the fourth studio album by American extreme metal band Lair of the Minotaur. It was released on April 13, 2010 under the newly created label The Grind-House, an independent record label to replace the band's former label Southern Lord.

Like the band's previous album, War Metal Battle Master, a music video for the title track was made, this time directed by Ryan Oliver of Deathblow Productions.

The track "Let's Kill These Motherfuckers" appeared in the soundtrack of the 2015 New Zealand horror comedy film Deathgasm.

== Track listing ==
1. "Attack the Gods" – 3:39
2. "Let's Kill These Motherfuckers" – 2:42
3. "Riders of Skullhammer, We Ride the Night" – 1:58
4. "Evil Power" – 2:19
5. "Goatstorm" – 1:43
6. "Hunt and Devour" – 1:31
7. "Metal Titans" – 2:04
8. "Blood from the Witch's Vein" – 2:50
9. "We Are Hades" – 4:07
10. "Death March of the Conquerors" – 4:18
11. "The Violent Iron Age of Man" – 3:25

== Personnel ==
- Steven Rathbone – vocals, guitar and mixing
- D.J. Barraca – bass
- Chris Wozniak – drums
