= Lair of the Minotaur =

American metal band

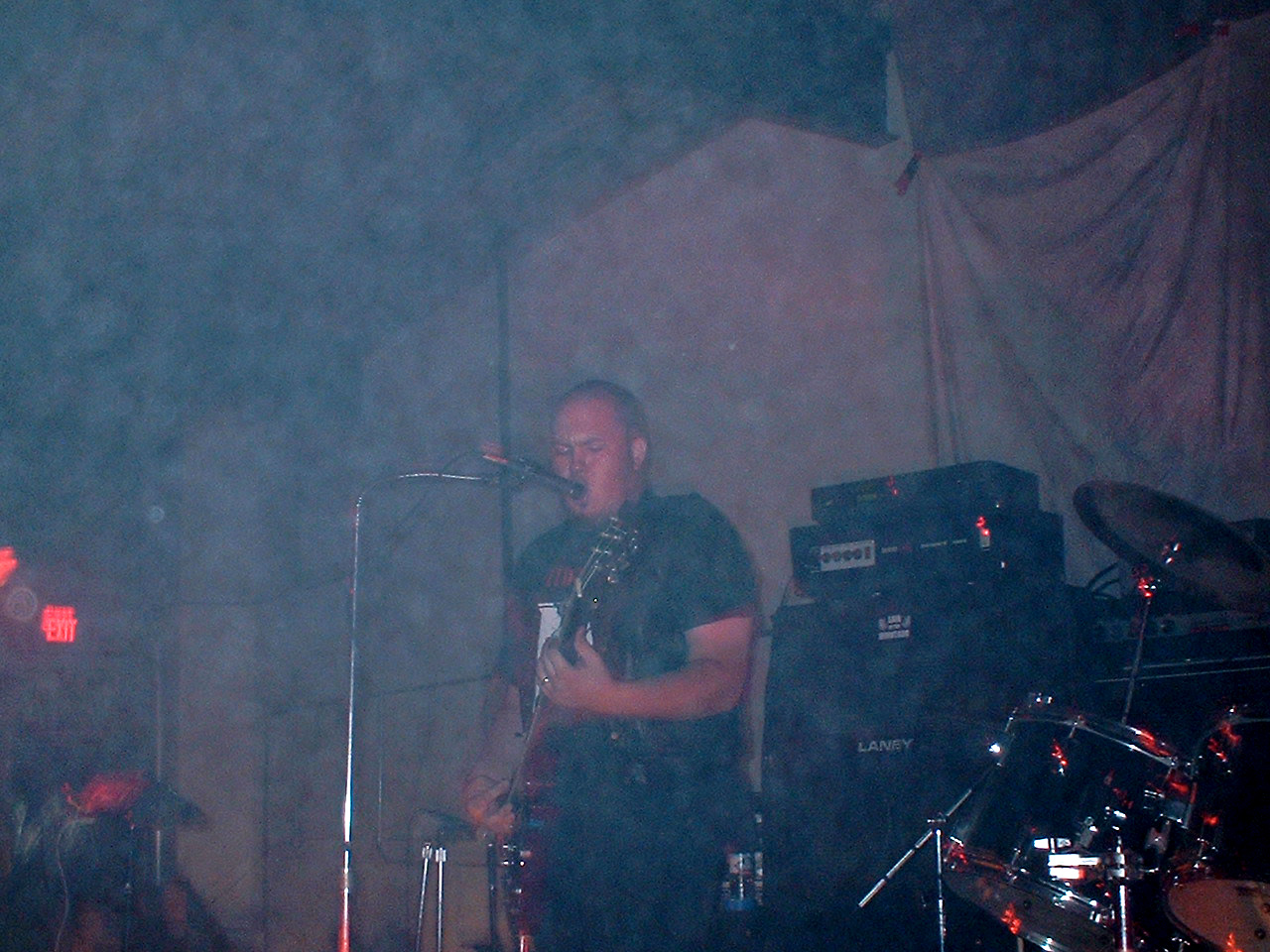
- Lair of the Minotaur performing in 2004

Background information
- Origin: Chicago, Illinois, U.S.
- Genres: Sludge metal, thrash metal
- Years active: 2003–present
- Labels: Southern Lord, The Grind-House
- Members: Steven Rathbone; Chris Wozniak; Nate Olp
- Past members: Larry Herweg; Donald James Barraca
- Website: lairoftheminotaur.net

Lair of the Minotaur is an American sludge/thrash metal band from Chicago. Formed in 2003, the band has released four studio albums.

== History ==
Lair of the Minotaur was formed by vocalist/guitarist Steven Rathbone in 2003 after his other band, 7000 Dying Rats, became a studio-only project. He enlisted 7000 Dying Rats bandmate Donald James Barraca on bass, and longtime friend Larry Herweg (of post-metal band Pelican) on drums. Lair of the Minotaur recorded their self-produced six-track debut EP in 2003.

Southern Lord Records signed the band in 2004 and released their full-length debut Carnage shortly after. They would release another EP, Cannibal Massacre in 2005, followed up by The Ultimate Destroyer a year after. Later in that same year, Herweg was replaced on drums. Originally replaced by temporary drummer Weaser Walter; Herweg would be permanently replaced by Chicago native Chris Wozniak. The band embarked on a European tour with The Capricorns during the summer of 2007 before returning to Chicago to record their third full-length, War Metal Battle Master, released by Southern Lord in March 2008. The band toured the United States extensively in 2008 in support of the album, with bands such as Kylesa, Today is the Day, Boris, Jungle Rot, Yakuza and Torche, among other bands. In October 2008, Barraca left the band and was replaced by Indianapolis native and Demiricous bass guitarist/vocalist Nate Olp.

An extensively edited version of the music video for the song "War Metal Battle Master" premiered on Headbangers Ball on MTV2 in July 2008. The plot of the video follows the song's lyrics, with the unedited version featuring Spartan-like warriors fighting with swords, graphic depictions of decapitations, and naked, blood-covered female cannibals feasting on human flesh. A DVD featuring both versions of the video, behind-the-scenes footage, interviews, and various live videos was released by Southern Lord in January 2009.

The band's fourth full-length album, Evil Power, was released in 2010 by The Grind-House Records. An accompanying music video for the title track, similar to the "War Metal Battle Master" video, was filmed and released in early 2010. In honor of the album, Lair of the Minotaur teamed up with Three Floyds Brewing to create and release a beer called Evil Power Imperial Pilsner in April 2011, coinciding with a performance at Three Floyds' Darklord Day festival. The beer was again brewed and released in April 2013, also coinciding with a performance at Darklord Day.

In 2013, LotM released a two-song EP titled Godslayer, and played a free show on Record Store Day to support the EP. In 2018, the band announced another EP, Dragon Eagle of Chaos, and played at Scorched Tundra Fest in Chicago, Illinois in support of the release.

== Discography ==
=== Studio albums ===
- Carnage (2004, Southern Lord Records)
- The Ultimate Destroyer (2006, Southern Lord Records)
- War Metal Battle Master (2008, Southern Lord Records)
- Evil Power (2010, The Grind-House Records)

=== EPs ===
- Lair of the Minotaur EP (2003, self-released)
- Cannibal Massacre EP (2005, Southern Lord Records)
- Godslayer EP (2013, The Grind-House Records)
- Dragon Eagle of Chaos EP (2018, The Grind-House Records)

=== DVDs ===
- War Metal Battle Master (2009, Southern Lord Records)
