= List of Armored Trooper VOTOMS episodes =

Armored Trooper VOTOMS (装甲騎兵ボトムズ, Sōkō Kihei Botomuzu) is a 52-episode anime television series, created by Ryosuke Takahashi and Sunrise, featuring mechanical designs by Kunio Okawara. The series originally aired in Japan from April 1, 1983, to March 23, 1984, on TV Tokyo.

== Armored Trooper Votoms ==
| No. | Title | Directed by | Original release date |
|---|---|---|---|
| 1 | "War's End"; Transliteration: "Shuusen" (Japanese: 終戦) | Mitsuko Kase | April 1, 1983 |
| 2 | "Uoodo"; Transliteration: "Udo" (Japanese: ウド) | Ami Tomobuki | April 8, 1983 |
| 3 | "Encounter"; Transliteration: "Deai" (出会い) | Renji Kawabata | April 15, 1983 |
| 4 | "Battling"; Transliteration: "Batoringu" (Japanese: バトリング) | Katsuyoshi Yatabe | April 22, 1983 |
| 5 | "The Trap"; Transliteration: "Wana" (Japanese: 罠) | Mitsuko Kase | April 29, 1983 |
| 6 | "Prototype"; Transliteration: "Moto-tai" (Japanese: 素体) | Ami Tomobuki | May 6, 1983 |
| 7 | "The Raid"; Transliteration: "Shūgeki" (Japanese: 襲撃) | Renji Kawabata | May 13, 1983 |
| 8 | "The Deal"; Transliteration: "Torihiki" (Japanese: 取引) | Katsuyoshi Yatabe | May 20, 1983 |
| 9 | "The Rescue"; Transliteration: "Kyūshutsu" (Japanese: 救出) | Mitsuko Kase | May 27, 1983 |
| 10 | "Red Shoulder"; Transliteration: "Reddo Shorudā" (Japanese: レッド・ショルダー) | Ami Tomobuki | June 3, 1983 |
| 11 | "Counterattack"; Transliteration: "Gyakushū" (Japanese: 逆襲) | Katsuya Kirino | June 10, 1983 |
| 12 | "Bonds"; Transliteration: "Kizuna" (Japanese: 絆) | Renji Kawabata | June 17, 1983 |
Chirico and Proto One engage in deadly co-operation — as the two come together in AT combat against hardened professionals; making much more apparent what was there already.
| 13 | "Escape"; Transliteration: "Dasshutsu" (Japanese: 脱出) | Renji Kawabata | June 24, 1983 |
| 14 | "Assemble EX-10"; Transliteration: "Assemburu EX-10" (Japanese: アッセンブルEX-10) | Mitsuko Kase | July 1, 1983 |
| 15 | "Doubts"; Transliteration: "Giwaku" (Japanese: 疑惑) | Katsuya Kirino | July 8, 1983 |
| 16 | "Clean Sweep"; Transliteration: "Sōtō" (Japanese: 掃討) | Ami Tomobuki | July 15, 1983 |
| 17 | "Reunion"; Transliteration: "Saikai" (Japanese: 再会) | Renji Kawabata | July 22, 1983 |
| 18 | "Turnabout"; Transliteration: "Kyūhen" (Japanese: 急変) | Mitsuko Kase | July 29, 1983 |
| 19 | "Intentions"; Transliteration: "Omowaku" (Japanese: 思惑) | Ryo Yasumura | August 5, 1983 |
| 20 | "Fyana"; Transliteration: "Faiana" (Japanese: フィアナ) | Ryosuke Takahashi | August 12, 1983 |
A retrospective episode, dealing with events from the series' beginning to now.
| 21 | "Upriver"; Transliteration: "Sokō" (Japanese: 溯行) | Katsuyoshi Yatabe | August 19, 1983 |
| 22 | "Contact Blast"; Transliteration: "Shokuhatsu" (Japanese: 触発) | Katsuya Kirino | August 26, 1983 |
| 23 | "Complications"; Transliteration: "Sakushō" (Japanese: 錯綜) | Ami Tomobuki | September 2, 1983 |
| 24 | "Intersection"; Transliteration: "Ōdan" (Japanese: 横断) | Renji Kawabata | September 9, 1983 |
| 25 | "Infiltration"; Transliteration: "Sennyū" (Japanese: 潜入) | Mitsuko Kase | September 16, 1983 |
| 26 | "Closing In"; Transliteration: "Nikuhaku" (Japanese: 肉迫) | Katsuyoshi Yatabe | September 23, 1983 |
| 27 | "Dark Change"; Transliteration: "Anten" (Japanese: 暗転) | Ami Tomobuki | September 30, 1983 |
| 28 | "Destiny"; Transliteration: "Sadame" (運命) | Ryosuke Takahashi | October 7, 1983 |
clip show
| 29 | "Two People"; Transliteration: "Futari" (Japanese: 二人) | Renji Kawabata | October 14, 1983 |
| 30 | "Phantasm"; Transliteration: "Genei" (Japanese: 幻影) | Yoshizō Tsuda | October 21, 1983 |
| 31 | "Nonaggression Zone"; Transliteration: "Fukashin Chū Iki" (Japanese: 不可侵宙域) | Mitsuko Kase | October 28, 1983 |
| 32 | "Ypsilon"; Transliteration: "Ipushiron" (Japanese: イプシロン) | Ami Tomobuki | November 4, 1983 |
| 33 | "Showdown"; Transliteration: "Taiketsu" (Japanese: 対決) | Katsuyoshi Yatabe | November 11, 1983 |
| 34 | "Planet Sunsa"; Transliteration: "Wakusei Sunsa" (Japanese: 惑星サンサ) | Renji Kawabata | November 18, 1983 |
| 35 | "Deadline"; Transliteration: "Shisen" (Japanese: 死線) | Yoshizō Tsuda | November 25, 1983 |
| 36 | "Love and Hate"; Transliteration: "Onshū" (Japanese: 恩讐) | Ryo Yasumura | December 2, 1983 |
| 37 | "Captives"; Transliteration: "Toriko" (Japanese: 虜) | Ami Tomobuki | December 9, 1983 |
| 38 | "Darkness"; Transliteration: "Kurayami" (Japanese: 暗闇) | Mitsuko Kase | December 16, 1983 |
| 39 | "Perfect Soldier"; Transliteration: "Pāfekuto・Sorujyā" (Japanese: パーフェクト・ソルジャー) | Katsuyoshi Yatabe | December 23, 1983 |
| 40 | "Friends"; Transliteration: "Nakama" (Japanese: 仲間) | Ryosuke Takahashi | December 30, 1983 |
clip show
| 41 | "Quent"; Transliteration: "Kuento" (Japanese: クエント) | Renji Kawabata | January 6, 1984 |
| 42 | "The Desert"; Transliteration: "Sabaku" (Japanese: 砂漠) | Yoshizō Tsuda | January 13, 1984 |
| 43 | "Legacy"; Transliteration: "Isan" (Japanese: 遺産) | Ami Tomobuki | January 20, 1984 |
| 44 | "The Forbidden"; Transliteration: "Kindan" (Japanese: 禁断) | Mitsuko Kase | January 27, 1984 |
| 45 | "Contact"; Transliteration: "Sōgū" (Japanese: 遭遇) | Katsuyoshi Yatabe | February 3, 1984 |
| 46 | "Premonition"; Transliteration: "Yokan" (Japanese: 予感) | Renji Kawabata | February 10, 1984 |
| 47 | "Disaster"; Transliteration: "Ihen" (Japanese: 異変) | Yoshizō Tsuda | February 17, 1984 |
| 48 | "Successor"; Transliteration: "Kōkei-sha" (Japanese: 後継者) | Ami Tomobuki | February 24, 1984 |
| 49 | "Overman"; Transliteration: "Inō-sha" (Japanese: 異能者) | Ryo Yasumura | March 2, 1984 |
| 50 | "Storm Clouds"; Transliteration: "Ranun" (Japanese: 乱雲) | Katsuyoshi Yatabe | March 9, 1984 |
| 51 | "Carnage"; Transliteration: "Shura" (Japanese: 修羅) | Renji Kawabata | March 16, 1984 |
| 52 | "Shooting Star"; Transliteration: "Ryūsei" (Japanese: 流星) | Mitsuko Kase | March 23, 1984 |

== Armor Hunter Mellowlink ==
| No. | Title | Original release date |
|---|---|---|
| 1 | "Stage 01: Wilderness"; Transliteration: "Suteiji Wan: Uirudanesu" (Japanese: Stage 01 ウイルダネス) | November 21, 1988 |
Merowlink's mission of vengeance begins at an isolated Melkian military base, as he pursues Captain Dockman. He also meets a young lady gambler named Lulusy Ramone and Lt. Keik Carradine of Melkian intelligence. Both will become closely entangled with Merow's exploits.
| 2 | "Stage 02: Colosseum"; Transliteration: "Suteiji Tsū: Koroshiamu" (Japanese: Stage 02 コロシアム) | November 21, 1988 |
Merowlink travels to the city of Ta Bing, to engage his next target in a Battling arena. Galvin Fox, the Silver Fox of Melkia, is ruthless and has a tendency to crush his opponents to death. But Merow may find a way to turn that habit against him.
| 3 | "Stage 03: Jungle"; Transliteration: "Suteiji Surī: Janguru" (Japanese: Stage 03 ジャングル) | December 21, 1988 |
Merowlink's next target is Major Snook, who has now taken the name Stavros and carved out a life for himself as a rich man in the civl war-torn Kingdom of Kummen. While Snook relishes a rare chance to hunt down Veela Guerrillas on his land, Merowlink comes upon him mid-attack, and proves to be more than the major bargained for.
| 4 | "Stage 04: Leaning Tower"; Transliteration: "Suteiji Fō: Rīningu Tawā" (Japanese: Stage 04 リーニングタワー) | December 21, 1988 |
Merowlink is trapped aboard a crashed ship, as he duels his next target to the death. This time however, it's him that's cornered.
| 5 | "Stage 05: Battlefield"; Transliteration: "Suteiji Faibu: Batorufīrudo" (Japanese: Stage 05 バトルフィールド) | January 21, 1989 |
Merowlink's motorcycle breaks down while traveling between locations. As he waits out a passing acid-rain storm, he dreams of the deaths of his comrades, and how his endeavor for revenge began.
| 6 | "Stage 06: Prison"; Transliteration: "Suteiji Shikusu: Purizun" (Japanese: Stage 06 プリズン) | January 21, 1989 |
Merowlink is locked up in a prison where his next target is the warden. Beset by both the other prisoners and the warden's interrogations, he bides his time as he awaits Lulusy to arrive with a performing troupe, to carry out his latest plan for revenge.
| 7 | "Stage 07: Railway"; Transliteration: "Suteiji Sebun: Reiruuei" (Japanese: Stage 07 レイルウェイ) | February 21, 1989 |
Merowlink stows away on a train headed deep into wilderness territory where bandits are prone to attack. The train swaps its original engine for a battle armed and armored engine as it takes on its new and all important passenger General Helmetione. Lt. Carradine quietly slips on board the train where coincidentally Lulusy is travelling on the train as well. The train begins its journey and the raiders led by a Captain Ganard plot their attack. Ganard, a former commanding officer in the army is one of the many officers responsible for the misfortune that befell Merowlink and his unit. Lulusy leaves her cabin and proceeds to the dining car for some breakfast. As she walks past the seated passengers the notices a bald obese man and turns to face him. It is her uncle General Helmetione. They exchange words as Lt. Carradine observes from a distance. The conversation ends with Lulusy slapping her uncle. The bandits attack as military officers bring out weapons to return fire at them. During the firefight Merowlink emerges on the outside of one of the rail cars. He recognizes the bright red AT leading the bandits as the personal mech of Officer Ganard and commandeering a bandit cycle, makes haste in attacking Ganard. Merow manages to board Ganard's AT and Ganard fearing for his life rams the train, flinging Merow harshly inside the train at the feet of Lulusy. After much verbal back and forth Ganard recognizes Merowlink and his mission. They fight, with Merowlink fatally impaling Ganard upon his rifle's pilebunker then ejecting him out the hole in the train they came through. Helmetione and his second in command are safe as they disconnected the engine from the remaining cars. He laughs at the escape they have made. Merowlink goes to the landing spot of Ganard and listens to his final words. As Helmetione's train escapes, Ganard remarks openly to Merowlink that he allowed his real enemy to escape, referring to Helmetione. Merowlink in shock questions Ganard and his last words are "That was the guy you should kill." Lulus tells him Helmetione's full name and that as a merchant from Melkia the Planbandol Armored Battalion was controlled by him. The episode ends with them stranded and Lt. Carradine looking on remarking to himself that "Things just got interesting."
| 8 | "Stage 08: Ghost Town"; Transliteration: "Suteiji Eito: Gōsuto Taun" (Japanese: Stage 08 ゴーストタウン) | February 21, 1989 |
Merowlink and Lulusy flee the train after being discovered by border guards and become trapped in the ghost town of Kerama City. Kerama City was a processing refinery for "Polymer Ringer's Solution", the highly volatile muscle activator/refresher for the ATs. Merowlink uses this as a trap for the special forces AT team led by Major Boyle. Boyle eventually corners Merowlink and Lulusy and a fist fight ensues. Boyle bests Merowlink and takes Lulusy by force. But during their escape, his men accidentally ignite the PRS storage tanks, destroying much of Kerama City and forcing Merowlink to abandon his hold on Boyle's AT. Merow watches as Boyle flies off with Lulusy, firing his gun in the air in anger.
| 9 | "Stage 09: Forest"; Transliteration: "Suteiji Nain: Foresuto" (Japanese: Stage 09 フォレスト) | March 21, 1989 |
Merowlink fights to kill his next target and to rescue Lulusy, who has turned out be of noble birth. His battleground this time will be the grounds of her family's castle.
| 10 | "Stage 10: Castle"; Transliteration: "Suteiji Ten: Kyassuru" (Japanese: Stage 10 キャッスル) | March 21, 1989 |
Merowlink's final showdown with Major Boyle.
| 11 | "Stage 11: Base"; Transliteration: "Suteiji Irebun: Base" (Japanese: Stage 11 ベース) | April 28, 1989 |
Merowlink travels to the base to which Gen. Helmetione has retreated. Lt. Carradine's true agenda is revealed.
| 12 | "Last Stage"; Transliteration: "Rasuto Sutēji" (Japanese: ラストステージ) | April 28, 1989 |
After escaping the base, Merowlink is goaded by Lt. Carradine into returning for one last showdown in the name of his fallen comrades. Meanwhile, the uneasy truce between the Gilgamesh and the Balarant has come undone, and the skies over Melkia are now teeming with enemy ships. As the Hundred Years War reignites, two men face off one last time.
