= Barker's Pool =

Square in Sheffield, England

Coordinates: 53°22′49.9″N 1°28′17.4″W

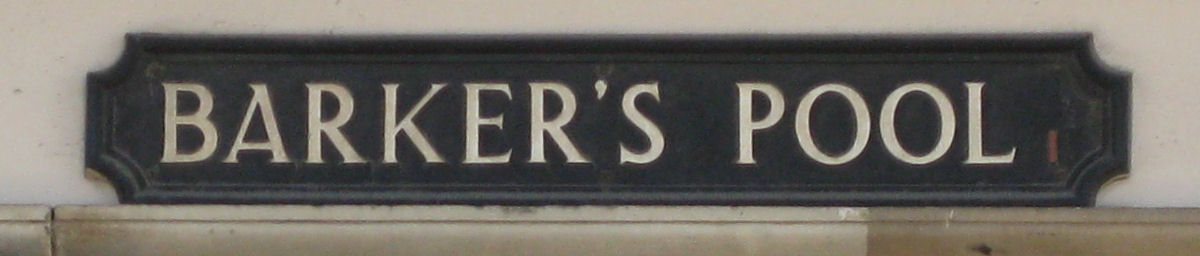
Street Sign

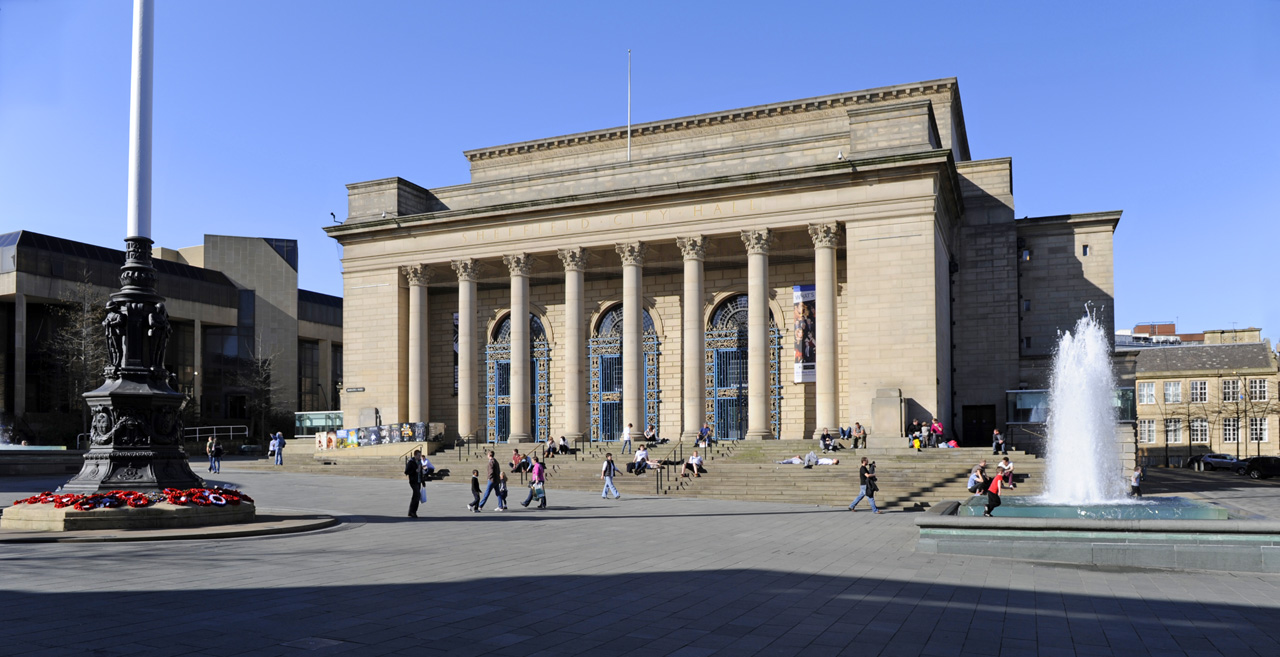
Barker's Pool with the City Hall and war memorial

Barker's Pool is a public city square and street in the centre of Sheffield, England. The focus of Barker's Pool is the Grade II* listed 90-foot-tall (27 m) war memorial that was unveiled on 28 October 1925 to commemorate the First World War. The Grade II* listed Sheffield City Hall is on the north side of the plaza facing the Grade II listed former John Lewis & Partners department store.

== History ==
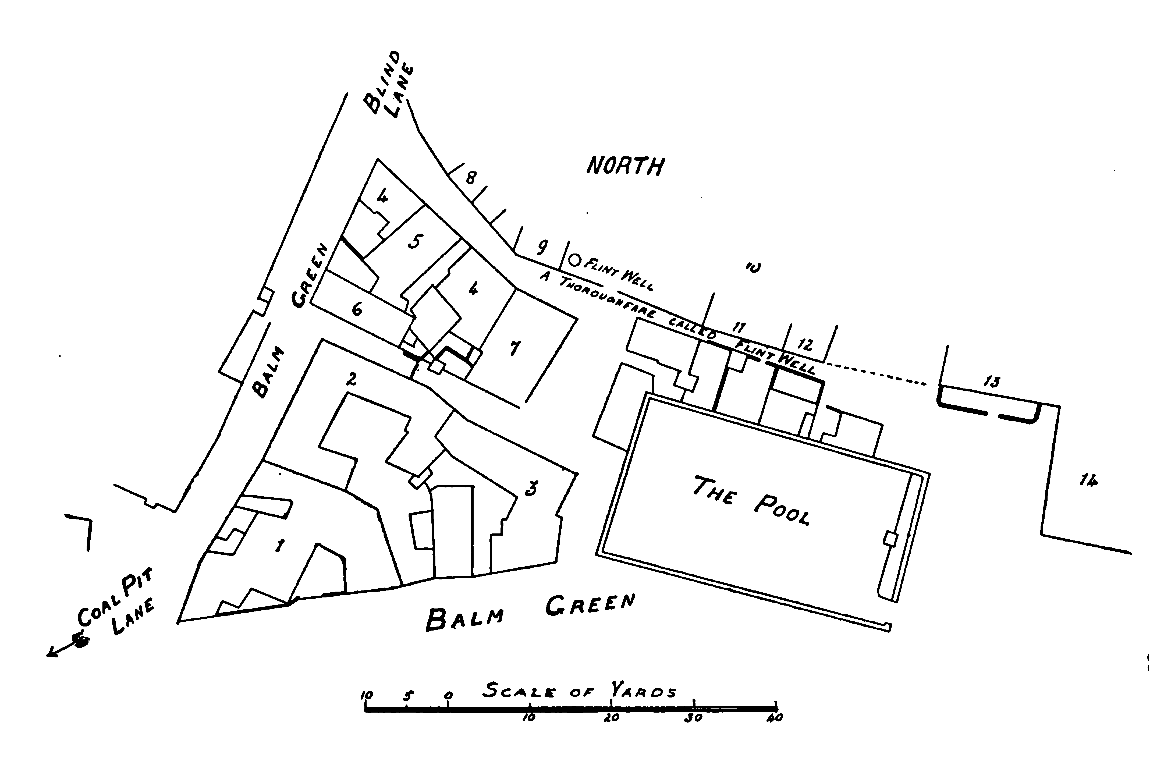
Plan of Barker's Pool in 1793

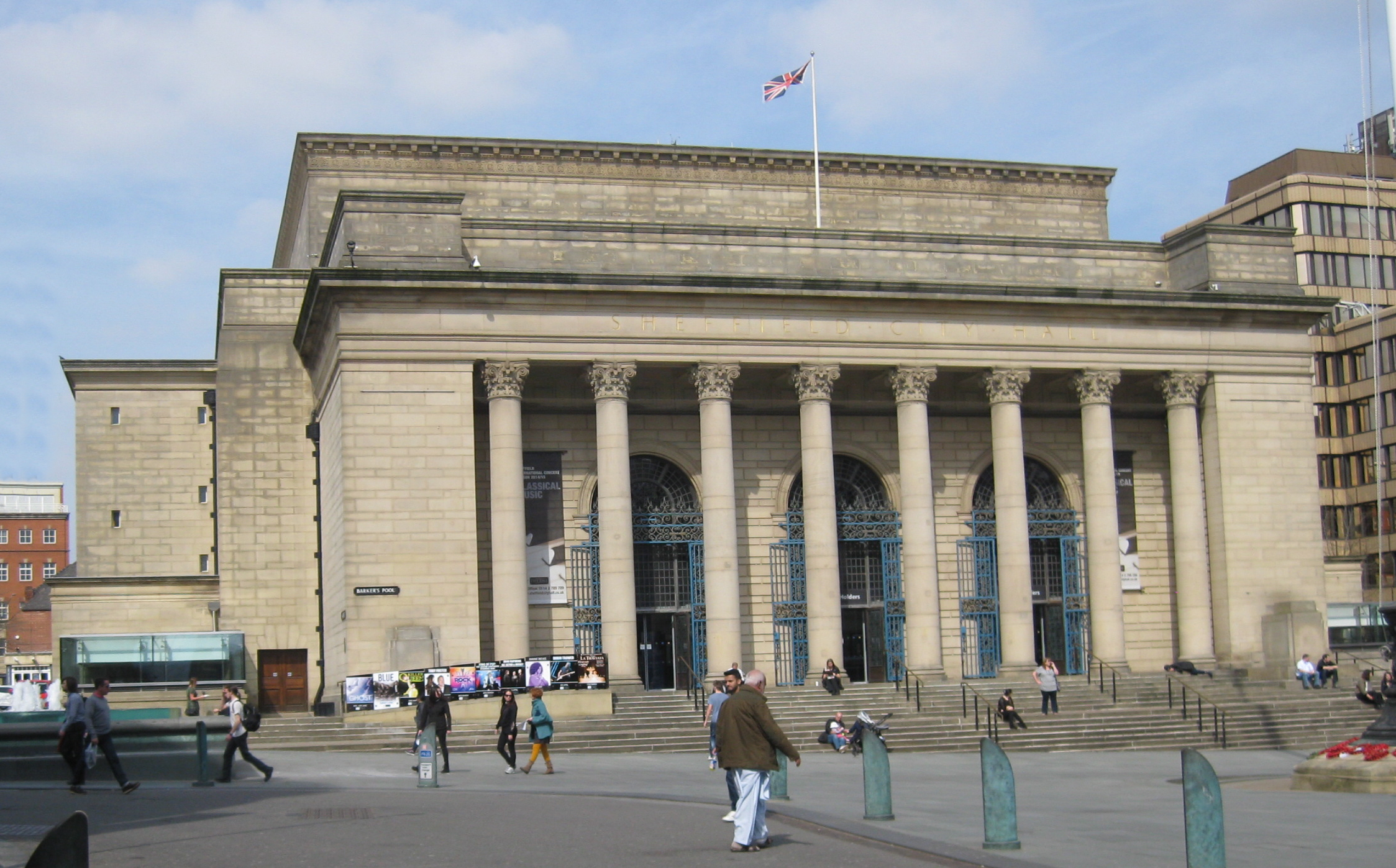
Sheffield City Hall from Barker's Pool

One of the earliest known references to Barker's Pool comes from the records of the Burgery of Sheffield for 1570. The name Barker's Pool may derive from a "Barker of Balme" mentioned in a deed dating from 1434. At this time the area was known as Balm Green and was on the edge of the town. Sheffield historian Sidney Addy suggests that the name Balm Green indicates that this site was formerly used for the cultivation of the herb lemon balm.

The reservoir was reconstructed and extended by Robert Rollinson before 1631, and was demolished in 1793.

In addition to supplying drinking water, the location of Barker's Pool at the highest point in the town allowed water released from the reservoir to be guided through channels that ran along the centre of the town's streets:

All the channels were then in the middle of the streets, which were generally in a very disorderly state, manure heaps often lying in them for a week together. About once every quarter the water was let out of Barker Pool, to run into all those streets into which it could be turned, for the purpose of cleansing them. The bellman gave notice of the exact time, and the favoured streets were all bustle, with a row of men, women, and children on each side of the channel, anxiously and joyfully awaiting, with mops, brooms, and pails, the arrival of the cleansing flood, whose first appearance was announced by a long, continuous shout. All below was anxious expectation; all above, a most amusing scene of bustling animation. Some people were throwing the water up against their houses and windows; some raking the garbage into the kennel; some washing their pigs; some sweeping the pavement; youngsters throwing water on their companions, or pushing them into the wide-spread torrent. Meanwhile a constant, Babel-like uproar, mixed with the barking of dogs and the grunting of pigs, was heard both above and below, till the waters, after about half an hour, had become exhausted.

The Albert Hall which stood where the John Lewis building is today, was a theatre only in the broadest sense; a big rectangular hall built in 1867 by a group of Wesleyan businessmen and opened in 1873 for music recitals and a variety of light entertainments. As might be expected, the hall was principally noted for evangelistic meetings, orchestral, choral and vocal concerts, operas and brass band competitions. There were also minstrel and variety shows, magic lantern and from 1896 moving picture shows. By 1919 it had a proscenium stage and about that time it became a more or less regular picture house with occasional variety, but it was subsequently steadily overtaken by purpose-built cinemas. The Albert Hall was gutted by fire in 1937 and demolished some years later.

Terraced properties and shops which once occupied one side of the square were demolished in 1912 to make way for The Regent Cinema which opened the following year. The Regent Cinema continued at the same site, later to become the Gaumont (this has also since been demolished). Other terraced properties and shops at the other side of the square were demolished around 1923 to make way for the construction of the Sheffield City Hall, which opened in 1932.

In 1925 a memorial was built to commemorate those fallen in the First World War. The Sheffield War Memorial was located on a traffic island in the middle of the road running across the front of the City Hall.

== Pedestrianisation ==
In 1989 the road in front of the City Hall was closed to motor traffic and the area was made a permanently pedestrianised area.

In 2005 the square was renovated and relaid in Yorkshire stone. Two glass-cased fountains (known locally as the City Hall fountains or Barkers Pool fountains) were installed outside the City Hall; these are illuminated at night, and several seated areas are also illuminated in colours that match the ground lighting of the nearby Millennium Square. The renovation won Gold in the 2006 Town Centre Environment Awards, run by the BCSC, held on 7 November 2006 in Manchester. Barkers Pool was one of two projects in Sheffield City Centre to be nominated, the other being the Station gateway at Howard Street.

== Women of Steel statue ==
The Women of Steel statue, is located where Barker's Pool meets Holly Street, directly to the left of the City Hall entrance steps. The statue was commissioned by Sheffield City Council in 2016 and was created by sculptor, Martin Jennings.

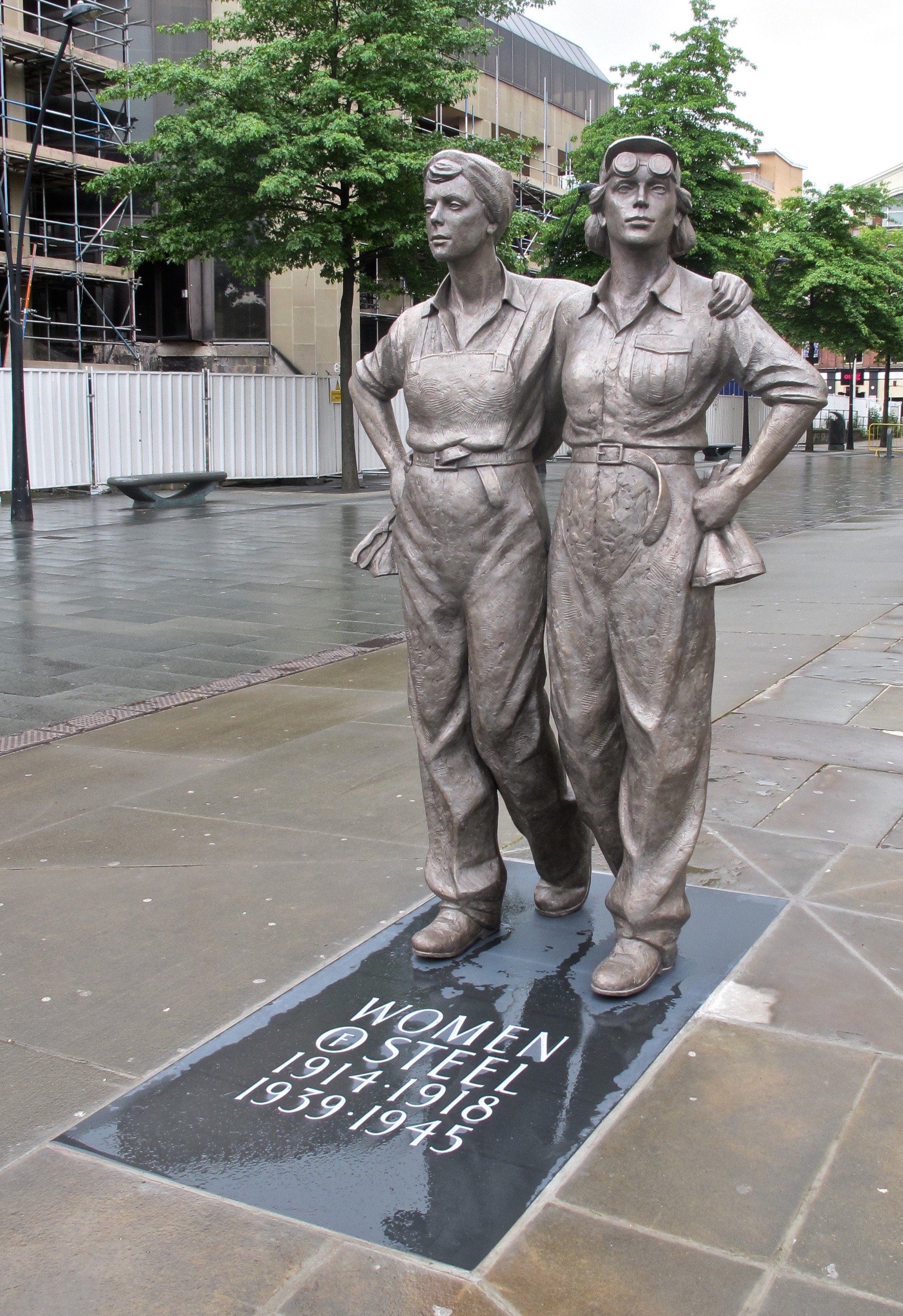
Women of Steel

The statue commemorates the women of Sheffield who worked in the city's steel factories during the First World War and Second World War.

== See also ==
- Sheffield City Centre
