= Parlanti Foundry =

Former English art bronze foundry

The Parlanti Foundry was an art bronze foundry located at the Albion Works, 59 Parsons Green Lane in Parsons Green, London, and was in operation from 1895 until 1917.

== History ==
The foundry was established by Alessandro Parlanti (c. 1862—c. 1921) and Gaetano Rovini, who traded from 1895 initially as Rovini & Parlanti, art bronze founders, and then as the Bronze Art Foundry Syndicate. Parlanti had come to London in about 1890, after working in the lost-wax (cire perdue) method of casting at the Fonderia Nelli, Rome's leading foundry, and ran the London business until August 1905 when its management was taken over by his brother Ercole James Palanti (c.1871-1955).

Alessandro Parlanti cast work for sculptors including Alfred Gilbert, Alfred Drury and Henri Gaudier-Brzeska, and also taught at the Central School of Arts and Crafts; students including Alfred Turner and Eric Gill later used his foundry to cast their work.

After Alessandro returned to Rome with his wife and children, the foundry was managed solely by Ercole, who had worked alongside his older brother since about 1897. After 1917 Ercole sold the foundry, and moved a short distance away to set up a new foundry at Beaumont Road, West Kensington. During the early 1920s, his business prospered from commissions for war memorials and became a limited company in 1926. However, it got into financial difficulties and went into liquidation the same year. Parlanti later established another casting business in Winders Road, Battersea.

== Commissions ==
Castings undertaken at Parsons Green included Sir George Frampton's Peter Pan statue, George Frederic Watts' Physical Energy, Albert Toft's Boer War memorial (1906) in Birmingham's Cannon Hill Park and the Glenelg war memorial (sculpture by Louis Deuchars; unveiled 1920). Later castings include the sculpture on the Royal Air Force Memorial in London (1923) and the Sheffield War Memorial (1925).
