= Carnage UK =

UK business

- Type: Private
- Industry: University student entertainment
- Founded: June 2007
- Headquarters: Birmingham, UK
- Key people: Paul Bahia
- Products: Pub crawls
- Parent: Varsity Leisure Group (VLG) Ltd
- Website: Carnage UK

Carnage UK is a company that organises pub crawls for students in the United Kingdom. It hosts events in 45 towns and cities each year. The company's events have been criticised for encouraging binge-drinking and wreaking havoc on communities. Drunken participants have gained notoriety for urinating on war memorials, as well as beating homeless and elderly people. Several student unions have banned the company from advertising on campus.

== Background ==
The idea for Carnage UK was originally taken from a University of Birmingham event named 'Carnage', run by the university's raising-and-giving society Carnival Rag. The original Birmingham Carnage has since been rebranded as 'Karma', with all proceeds going to charity.

Carnage UK arranges events for an estimated 350,000 undergraduate students in 45 towns and cities each year. For £10, students receive a t-shirt and free entry to around 10 local pubs, bars and nightclubs, with many of the venues offering drinks promotions during the events. The company is part of the Varsity Leisure Group. According to the company's website, they are "always looking for fun & bubbly student promotional staff".

== Incidents ==
=== University of Bath ===
In 2008, a student at the University of Bath hanged himself behind a nightclub during an event organised by Carnage UK.

=== Sheffield Hallam University ===
In October 2009, a Sports Technology student at Sheffield Hallam University, was photographed urinating on a war memorial in Barker's Pool after drinking for several hours on a bar crawl organised by Carnage UK. The photograph was later published in a number of newspapers. The student pleaded guilty to outraging public decency. The judge in the case said that he felt the student's actions were directly caused by his heavy consumption of alcohol, and that Carnage UK should also have been present in court. Responding to this criticism, a press officer for Carnage UK told PR Week that much of the press coverage over the incident had been unfair. He pointed out that more than 2000 students attended the event and that the student who urinated was responsible for his own actions.

=== University of Exeter ===
After an event in Exeter in October 2009, it was reported that the police were to consider charging the company for the extra officers that needed to be deployed whilst their events were running.

=== Bangor ===
In March 2009, a 61-year-old man was assaulted by one of its organisers after he asked about arrangements regarding the event.

=== Southampton ===
In October 2010, another heavily intoxicated student, this time from Southampton University, was photographed urinating on a war memorial.

=== Cardiff ===
In June 2014, a group of drunken women emerged from a Carnage pub in Cardiff and commenced verbally abusing and physically assaulting a homeless man, initially profanely yelling at him to get a job, then dragging him across the pavement and street, punching him, pulling his trousers down and kicking his face.

== Student organisation prohibition ==
The National Union of Students launched a campaign to stop the organisation hosting further events, and according to a poll by The Observer newspaper, at least 17 student unions banned them from advertising on their premises.

== Binge-drinking ==
The founder of Varsity Leisure Group, 29-year-old Inderpaul Sandeep Singh Bahia, has denied that the company encourages binge-drinking, saying, "Our events are heavily focused on group identity, social and ethical cohesion, and fancy dress themes."

~2026~
