= Carnage (Lair of the Minotaur album) =

Studio album by Lair of the Minotaur
- Released: August 23, 2004
- Recorded: at Volume Studio, Chicago, Illinois
- Genre: Thrash metal, sludge metal
- Length: 37:41
- Label: Southern Lord Records

Lair of the Minotaur chronology
Lair of the Minotaur (2003)	Carnage (2004)	Cannibal Massacre (2005)

Professional ratings
Review scores
Source	Rating
AllMusic	3/5 stars
Scene Point Blank	7/10 stars

Carnage is the debut full-length album by the Chicago-based thrash/sludge metal band Lair of the Minotaur. It was released in CD form by Southern Lord Records, along with a red vinyl version with a gold and black screenprinted cover limited to 666 copies.

== Track listing ==
1. Carnage Fucking Carnage – 3:32
2. The Wolf – 4:54
3. Lion Killer – 3:22
4. Caravan of Blood Soaked Kentauroi – 5:58
5. Enemy of Gods – 3:46
6. Warlord – 5:34
7. Demon Serpent – 3:53
8. Burning Temple – 5:53

== Personnel ==
Adapted from Discogs.

- Steven Rathbone – vocals, guitar, synthesizer
- Donal James Barraca – bass
- Larry Herweg – drums

Production and design

- Tom Denney – album artwork
- Sanford Parker – engineering, mixing
- John Brearley – engineering assistant
- Scott Hull – mastering
- Erica Barraca – photography
