= Il Teatro degli Orrori/Zu =

Studio album by Zu, Il Teatro degli Orrori
- Released: 2008
- Genre: Experimental rock, post-hardcore
- Length: 11:48
- Label: La Tempesta Dischi

Zu chronology
Identification with the Enemy: A Key to the Underworld (2007)	Il Teatro degli Orrori/Zu (2008)	Zu/Xabier Iriondo/Damo Suzuki (2008)

Il Teatro degli Orrori chronology
Dell'Impero delle Tenebre (2007)	Teatro degli Orrori/Zu (2008)	A Sangue Freddo (2009)

Il Teatro degli Orrori/Zu is a limited edition split album of the Italian bands Il Teatro degli Orrori and Zu.

More precisely the record was limited to 666 copies, consisting of a 10-inch vinyl on CD included. The album is published by the Italian label La Tempesta Dischi.

== Track listing ==
1. Fallo! - 3:27 (Do It!)
2. Nostalgia - 8:21 (Homesickness)
