= Il mondo nuovo (album) =

Studio album by Il Teatro degli Orrori
- Released: 2012
- Genre: Noise rock
- Label: La Tempesta

Il Teatro degli Orrori chronology
A sangue freddo (2009)	Il mondo nuovo (2012)	Il Teatro degli Orrori (2015)

Il mondo nuovo (The New World) is the third studio album by the Italian band Il Teatro degli Orrori, released in 2012.

The album was a finalist for the Targa Tenco 2012 in the category "Album of the Year".

== Album ==
The album title pays homage to the work Brave New World by Aldous Huxley. The record looks like a concept album about immigration and initially had the title Storia di un immigrato (in reference to Storia di un impiegato by Fabrizio De André).

The album cover is called Face Cancel, by Roberto Coda Zabetta.

The song "Ion" is dedicated to Ion Cazacu, Romanian worker killed by fire in 2000 in Varese, the entrepreneur, head of the company where he worked Ion, killed him after it had rebelled against the inhumane working conditions to which he was subjected, along his companions. Pierpaolo Capovilla asked the widow Nicoleta Cazacu permission to post the song.

The song "Doris" is a revised version of the Shellac's song from the EP Uranus.

== Track list ==
1. "Rivendico" (I claim)
2. "Io cerco te" (I'm looking for you)
3. "Non vedo l'ora" (I can't wait)
4. "Skopje"
5. "Gli Stati Uniti d'Africa" (The United States of Africa)
6. "Cleveland – Baghdad"
7. "Martino" (Martin)
8. "Cuore d'oceano" (featuring Caparezza) (Heart of the ocean)
9. "Ion"
10. "Monica"
11. "Pablo"
12. "Nicolaj" (Nicholas)
13. "Dimmi addio" (Say goodbye to me)
14. "Doris"
15. "Adrian"
16. "Vivere e morire a Treviso" (Living and dying in Treviso)

== Lineup ==
- Pierpaolo Capovilla – voice
- Gionata Mirai – guitar
- Giulio Favero – bass
- Francesco Valente – drums

== Charts ==
Chart performance for Il mondo nuovo
Chart (2012)	Peak position
Italian Albums (FIMI)	10
