= Dell'impero delle tenebre =

Studio album by Il Teatro degli Orrori
- Released: 2007
- Genre: Noise rock
- Label: La Tempesta

Il Teatro degli Orrori chronology
Dell'impero delle tenebre (2007)	A sangue freddo (2009)

Dell'impero delle tenebre (Of the Empire of Darkness) is the debut studio album by the Italian band Il Teatro degli Orrori, released in 2007.

The song "La canzone di Tom" is dedicated to Tom, a friend of Capovilla and Favero and manager of the band One Dimensional Man.

The song "E lei venne!" is a reinterpretation of the poem The Assassin's Wine, by Charles Baudelaire.

== Videoclips ==
Were made video clips of the songs "Compagna Teresa" (directed by Mauro Lovisetto), "La canzone di Tom" (directed by Mauro Lovisetto) and "Carrarmatorock!" (directed by Angelo Camba).

== Track list ==
1. "Vita mia" – 4:15 (My life)
2. "Dio mio" – 3:06 (My God)
3. "E lei venne!" – 2:40 (And she came!)
4. "Compagna Teresa" – 3:59 (Comrade Teresa)
5. "L'impero delle tenebre" – 4:13 (The Empire of Darkness)
6. "Scende la notte" – 4:03 (Night falls)
7. "Carrarmatorock!" – 4:11 (Tankrock!)
8. "Il turbamento della gelosia" – 5:09 (The turmoil of jealousy)
9. "Lezione di musica" – 6:35 (Music lesson)
10. "La canzone di Tom" – 5:07 (Tom's song)
11. "Maria Maddalena" – 8:06 (Mary Magdalene)

== Line-up ==
- Pierpaolo Capovilla – voice
- Gionata Mirai – guitar
- Giulio Favero – bass
- Francesco Valente – drums

=== Guests ===
- Nicola Manzan – violin on "Maria Maddalena"
- Angelo Maria Santisi – cello on "Maria Maddalena"
- Richard Tiso – bass on "Lezione di musica"

== Charts ==
Chart performance for Dell'impero delle tenebre
Chart (2024)	Peak position
Italian Vinyls (FIMI)	15
