= Identification with the Enemy: A Key to the Underworld =

Studio album by Zu, Nobukazu Takemura
- Released: 2007
- Genre: Experimental rock
- Length: 40:43
- Label: Atavistic Records

Zu, Nobukazu Takemura chronology
Zu/Iceburn (2006)	Identification with the Enemy: A Key to the Underworld (2007)	Il Teatro degli Orrori/Zu (2008)

Identification with the Enemy: A Key to the Underworld is the eighth studio album by the Italian band Zu, in collaboration with Japanese musician Nobukazu Takemura, released in 2007.

== Critical reception ==
AllMusic review described it as "skittering IDM" combined with "free jazz-influenced gestural noise; [..] at times intriguingly atmospheric, at others unsettling and frenetic".

== Track list ==
1. Alone with the Alone (4:58)
2. The Culprit (5:06)
3. Standing on This Zero Spot (2:43)
4. New Buddhas in Stock (1:33)
5. Usual conversations with Yama (12:04)
6. Awake in the Next Room (2:38)
7. Everyone Gets His Own Nemesis (4:01)
8. Deliver Me From the Book of Self (7:40)

== Line up ==
- Luca T. Mai / baritone sax
- Jacopo Battaglia / drums, electronics
- Massimo Pupillo / bass
- Nobukazu Takemura / electronics
