= Meditavolutions =

Studio album by The Iceburn Collective
- Released: April 9, 1996
- Recorded: December 1994 at Fast Forward Studios, New York City
- Genre: Jazz fusion, experimental rock, noise rock, math rock, free jazz, avant-garde jazz
- Length: 70:29
- Label: Revelation
- Producer: Gentry Densley, Tony Korologos

Iceburn chronology
Poetry of Fire (1995)	Meditavolutions (1996)	Polar Bear Suite (1997)

Professional ratings
Review scores
Source	Rating
Allmusic	4.5/5 stars

Meditavolutions is the fourth album by The Iceburn Collective, released on April 9, 1996, through Revelation Records.

== Track listing ==
No.	Title	Length
1.	"Trills & Cones"	7:28
2.	"Revolution II"	2:49
3.	"Vision"	5:46
4.	"Sphinx"	22:08
5.	"Centre"	1:11
6.	"Objects"	6:23
7.	"History"	14:36
8.	"Revolution III"	3:25
9.	"Cones and Trills"	6:43

== Personnel ==
The Iceburn Collective

- Gentry Densley – guitar, sitar, production, engineering
- James Holder – guitar
- Greg Nielsen – tenor saxophone
- Daniel Day – drums
- Doug Wright – bass guitar

Production and additional personnel

- Randy Herbert – percussion
- Tony Korologos – production, engineering, recording
