= Eagle Twin =

American metal band

- Origin: Salt Lake City, Utah
- Genres: Doom metal, sludge metal, drone metal
- Years active: 2007–present
- Labels: Southern Lord
- Members: Gentry Densley, Tyler Smith
- Website: eagletwin.com

Eagle Twin is an American metal band formed in Salt Lake City, Utah, by singer/guitarist Gentry Densley and drummer Tyler Smith. Eagle Twin's music could be broadly classified as doom metal or sludge metal, but also touches on progressive rock, blues rock, jazz fusion and psychedelic rock, featuring lengthy instrumental passages and Densley's gruff, half-chanted vocals, which occasionally veer into overtone singing.

== Background ==
Unlike Gentry Densley's previous band Iceburn, which explored a fusion of punk rock, metal, jazz, classical music and free improvisation, Eagle Twin is more directly rooted in heavy metal traditions, particularly the focus upon the guitar riff. When asked what shaped the Eagle Twin sound, Densley replied:

Well, a lot of it comes from "the riff" and the whole tradition of "the riff". It's something that I've become more conscious of – from Page and Iommi, down through people like Wino – the whole idea of people channelling "the riff". I'm also interested in myths and mythology and the creation of myths, the scale of the universal consciousness and how these same stories pop up over the years – the whole idea of collective memory and looking at riffs the same way; the real language of "the riff". I also wanted to do more story telling so there are probably influences from a lot of blues artists and also a lot of Mahavishnu influences; harmonically, I just started thinking about putting some more of that in, and there are elements of fusion jazz as well.

Eagle Twin's debut album, The Unkindness of Crows, was released in 2009 by Southern Lord Records. A loose concept album presenting a creation myth based on folklore and mythology about crows, the album's liner notes state "We extend apologies for our shameless fleecing of dead poets, native myths, mormon hymns, japanese haikus, Upton Sinclair, and especially Ted Hughes." Hughes's 1970 collection Crow was a key inspiration for the album. Gentry Densley said:

I work in a jail library. I work in the jail giving people books, I'm the librarian. We used to have a copy of Ted Hughes’ The Crow. It's a book of poems. He was poet laureate in Britain before he died, married to Sylvia Plath who wrote some awesome poems as well and The Bell Jar. I picked that up and the language of the poems would always suggest the music to me, the rhythm would give me riff ideas, and it came from that as well, but the lyrical ideas started meaning more to me and it seems like he takes all sorts of world myths and biblical things and imposes onto his crow character. I thought that was really interesting that you could take these universal myths and embody them into one character, just show how it all connects. So that started to interest me a lot more and so I started using the crow as my own variation on that character. Making up my own stories about him and stuff.

Critic Gregory Heaney of Allmusic gives the album four-out-of-five stars, writing, "While not necessarily for the masses, The Unkindness of Crows is a solid experience for anyone looking for something that plays with the [doom/sludge metal] genre in an interesting, and powerfully noisy, way." Critic Daren Cowan rates the album at seven out of ten: "Each track relates a dark, cerebral sound with psychedelic undertones [...] Densley’s voice brings a unique aspect to the album. Due to the length of each track and the album’s plodding nature, The Unkindness of Crows requires a certain mood to digest, but should fit followers of Southern Lord’s classic catalogue quite well."

Their second album, The Feather Tipped The Serpent's Scale, was released by Southern Lord on August 28, 2012. Densley said that the album differs from the band's debut in that it has a "more specific arc for the overall album and narrative. We ended up with the birds burning in their battle with the sun, turning into snakes. We wanted to eventually evolve the reptilian back to the avian in the end. To us it was just an extension of our previous methodology with more emphasis on transformation or progression".

== Line-Up ==
- Gentry Densley - vocals, guitars
- Tyler Smith - drums

== Discography ==
=== Albums ===
- The Unkindness of Crows (2009)
- The Feather Tipped the Serpent's Scale (2012)
- The Thundering Heard (2018)

=== Splits ===
- Split with Night Terror (2009)
- Split with Pombagira (2010)
- Legends Of The Desert: Vol. 4 with The Otolith (2024)
