= Poetry of Fire =

Studio album by Iceburn
- Released: 1995
- Recorded: October 1993 at Fast Forward Studios, New York City
- Genre: Progressive metal, alternative metal, math rock, experimental rock, free jazz, jazz fusion
- Length: 72:35
- Label: Revelation

Iceburn chronology
Hephaestus (1993)	Poetry of Fire (1995)	Meditavolutions (1996)

Poetry of Fire is the third album by Iceburn, released in 1995 through Revelation Records.

== Track listing ==
No.	Title	Writer(s)	Length
1.	"Poem of Fire (Extended Version)"	Andrzej Busza, Alexander Scriabin	16:18
2.	"Stones"	Miles Davis	15:17
3.	"Blues"	Miles Davis	9:38
4.	"Discolor"		17:28
5.	"Poem of Fire"	Geezer Butler, Tony Iommi, Ozzy Osbourne, Bill Ward	13:54

The song "Stones" is a version of Miles Davis's "Milestones", and "Blues" is a version of his song "All Blues".

The vinyl release does not include (4) and (5).

== Personnel ==
Iceburn

- Gentry Densley – guitar
- James Holder – guitar
- Greg Nielsen – tenor saxophone
- Joseph Chad Smith – drums
- Cache Tolman – bass guitar

Production and additional personnel

- Rick Egan – photography
- Dean Harper – recording on "Discolor"
- Iceburn – production
- Tony Korologos – recording on "Poem of Fire", "Stones" and "Blues"
- Spanky – recording on "Poem of Fire (live)"
