= A sangue freddo =

2009 studio album by Il Teatro degli Orrori

Studio album by Il Teatro degli Orrori
- Released: 2009
- Genre: Noise Rock
- Label: La Tempesta

Il Teatro degli Orrori chronology
Dell'impero delle tenebre (2007)	A sangue freddo (2009)	Il mondo nuovo (2012)

A sangue freddo (In cold blood) is the second studio album by the Italian band Il Teatro degli Orrori, released in 2009.

== Album ==
The title track is dedicated to Nigerian poet and activist Ken Saro-Wiwa, who was killed in 1995. Among the most inspired songs to emerge from this album is "Padre nostro", a revisiting of the Pater Noster, which the group dedicated to Jesus Christ, considered a revolutionary character, as well as "Majakovskij", a re-reading of the poem "Beloved himself dedicates these lines the author" of Vladimir Vladimirovich Mayakovsky, Russian poet.

This album was considered by Rolling Stone magazine's 30th best album ever released in Italy.

== Track list ==
1. "Io ti aspetto" – 3:57 (I'm waiting for you)
2. "Due" – 2:45 (Two)
3. "A sangue freddo" – 2:58 (In cold blood)
4. "Mai dire mai" – 3:44 (Never say never)
5. "Direzioni diverse" – 3:42 (Different directions)
6. "Il terzo mondo" – 3:11 (The third world)
7. "Padre nostro" – 4:12 (Our Father)
8. "Majakovskij" – 5:32
9. "Alt!" – 3:40 (Stop!)
10. "È colpa mia" – 5:28 (It's my fault)
11. "La vita è breve" – 3:34 (Life is short)
12. "Die Zeit" – 10:52 (The time)

== Line-up ==
- Pierpaolo Capovilla – voice
- Gionata Mirai – guitar
- Tommaso Mantelli – bass
- Nicola Manzan – violin, guitar
- Francesco Valente – drums

== Charts ==
Chart performance for A sangue freddo
Chart (2009)	Peak position
Italian Albums (FIMI)	55
