= Zu / Iceburn =

Zu/Iceburn - Phonometak n. 1 - Split 10" Series

Studio album (split album) by Zu, Iceburn
- Released: 2006
- Genre: Experimental rock
- Label: Wallace Records, PhonoMetak Laboratories, Audioglobe

Zu, Iceburn chronology
Rai Sanawachi Koe Wo Hassu (2006)	Zu/Iceburn - Phonometak n. 1 - Split 10" Series (2006)	Identification with the Enemy: A Key to the Underworld (2006)

Zu/Iceburn is a self-titled 10" split album by Italian band Zu and the American post-hardcore band Iceburn, released in 2006, as Phonometak n. 1, part of the Split 10" Series by SoundMetak, an experimental music laboratory in Milan.

== Track listing ==
Zu With Xabier Iriondo - Side A

1. A1 Big Sea Warnings [1:48]
2. A2 Momentum [4:31]
3. A3 3 Rivers Conjunction [1:37]
4. A4 How We're Being Manipulated [3:07]
5. A5 It's Irrelevant Now [3:13]

Iceburn - Side B

1. B1 Odin's Beard [3:13]
2. B2 Swallow Mighty Earth [2:52]
3. B3 1000 Miles Stallion [4:11]
4. B4 Shaolin Taco [1:52]
