= Radiale =

Studio album by Zu, Spaceways Inc.
- Released: 2004
- Genre: Experimental rock
- Label: Atavistic Records
- Producer: Bob Weston

Zu, Spaceways Inc. chronology
Live in Helsinki (2003)	Radiale (2004)	The Way of the Animal Powers (2005)

Professional ratings
Review scores
Source	Rating
The Village Voice	A

Radiale is the fifth studio album by Italian band Zu, in collaboration with Spaceways Inc., released in 2004.

The album received an A grade from The Village Voice and was placed 8th in their Jazz Top Ten 2004.

== Track list ==
1. Canicula
2. Thanatocracy
3. Vegetalista
4. Pharmakon
5. Trash A Go-Go
6. Theme De YoYo
7. You And Your Folks, Me And My Folks
8. We Travel The Spaceways/Space Is The Place

== Line-up / Musicians ==
- Bass – Massimo Pupillo, Nate McBride (tracks: 5 to 8)
- Drums – Hamid Drake (tracks: 5 to 8), Jacopo Battaglia
- Reeds – Ken Vandermark
- Saxophone – Luca Tommaso Mai
