= Utopie e piccole soddisfazioni =

Studio album by Bologna Violenta
- Released: 2012
- Genre: Noise, industrial, electronic, grindcore
- Label: Wallace Records, Dischi Bervisti

Bologna Violenta chronology
Il Nuovissimo Mondo (2010)	Utopie e piccole soddisfazioni (2012)

Utopie e piccole soddisfazioni (translation: Utopias and small satisfactions) is the third studio album by the Italian one-man band Bologna Violenta, a project of Nicola Manzan, released in 2012 by Wallace Records.

Like the previous Il Nuovissimo Mondo, the album consists of short pieces and is almost entirely instrumental. Only two songs are sung: "You're enough" involved J. Randall of Agoraphobic Nosebleed, and "Valium Tavor Serenase" (a cover version of a song by CCCP - Fedeli alla linea, from the album Affinità-Divergenze fra il Compagno Togliatti e Noi), is sung by Aimone Romizi of Fast Animals And Slow Kids.

== Track list ==
1. "Incipit" – 1:36
2. "Vorrei sposare un vecchio" – 1:38
3. "Utopie" – 0:58
4. "Sangue in bocca" – 0:50
5. "Costruirò un castello per lei" – 1:10
6. "È sempre la solita storia, ma un giorno muori" – 0:51
7. "Valium, Tavor, Serenase" – 1:29
8. "You're enough" – 0:32
9. "Lasciate che i Potenti vengano a me 0:37
10. "Remerda" – 1:06
11. "Intermezzo" – 2:03
12. "Il convento sodomita" – 1:35
13. "Terrore nel Triregno" – 0:43
14. "Mi fai schifo" – 1:05
15. "Il bimbo" – 0:38
16. "Lutto nella testa" – 0:38
17. "Piccole soddisfazioni" – 0:59
18. "Popolo bue" – 0:42
19. "Le armi in fondo al mare" – 2:04
20. "Transexualismo" – 2:17
21. "Finale" – con rassegnazione" – 5:55

== Line-up ==
- Nicola Manzan (guitars, violin, electronics)

=== Other musicians ===
- J. Randall (voice in "You're enough")
- Aimone Romizi (voice in "Valium, Tavor, Serenase")
- Franz Valente (voice in "Mi fai schifo")
- Nunzia Tamburrano (narrator in "Remerda")
