= Il Teatro degli Orrori =

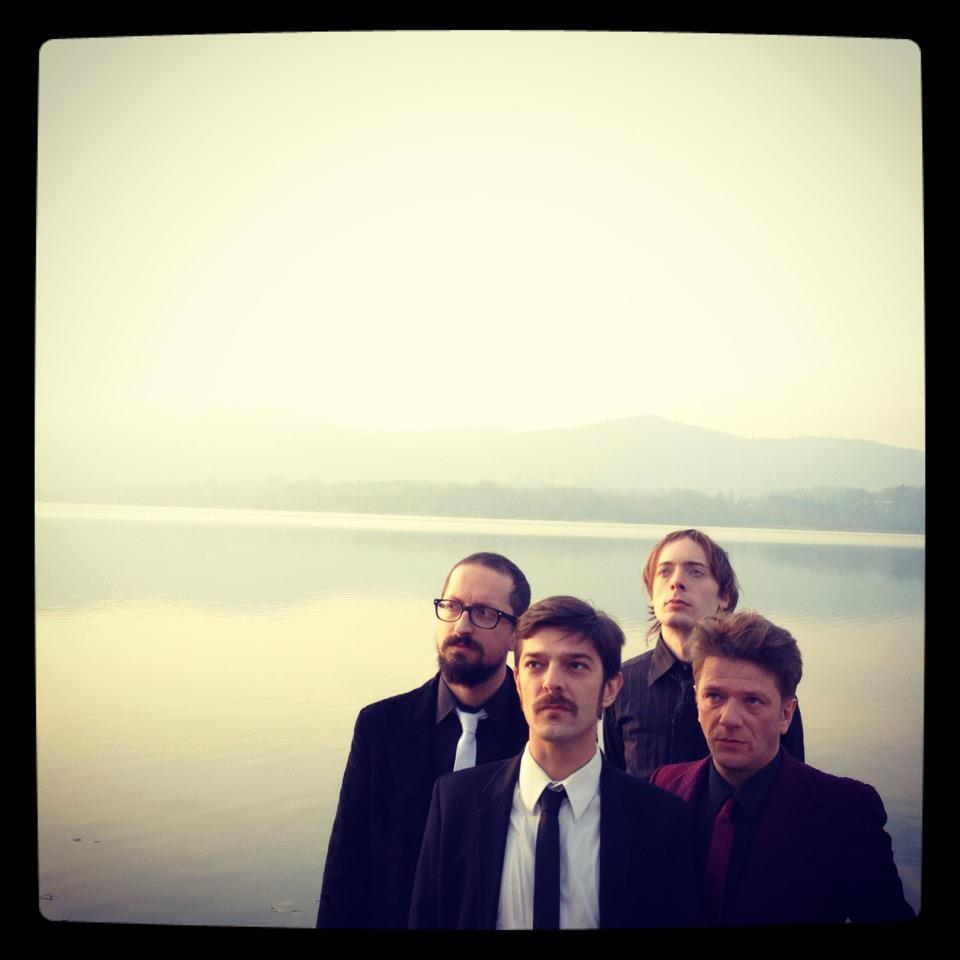

Background information
- Origin: Venice
- Genres: Noise rock Alternative rock
- Years active: 2005–2016; 2025

Il Teatro degli Orrori is an Italian noise rock band from Venice.

The band's name (Theater of Horrors) is inspired by the Theatre of Cruelty of Antonin Artaud.

== Biography ==
The group formed in the winter of 2005. The line-up consisted of Pierpaolo Capovilla (frontman of One Dimensional Man), Francesco Valente (One Dimensional Man) and Jonathan Mirai (voice and guitar of Super Elastic Bubble Plastic). They were later joined by Giulio Favero (formerly One Dimensional Man), thus completing the line-up. On 6 April 2007 their first album, Dell'impero delle tenebre, was released. On 20 June 2008, the band attended the Heineken Jammin' Festival supporting Linea 77.

On 25 March 2009, Il Teatro degli Orrori featured on the compilation album Il paese è reale, an idea of Manuel Agnelli of Afterhours following the group's participation at the Sanremo Music Festival 2009, to support and promote indie rock from the Italian underground scene. Their song, "Refusenik", was inspired by the events of Israeli conscientious objectors who refuse to take up arms in protest against the occupation of the Palestinian territories.

Two years after the release of Dell'impero delle tenebre, in 2009 the band released the album A sangue freddo for La Tempesta Records. The title song of the album is dedicated to Ken Saro-Wiwa, a Nigerian poet who was killed in 1995. The album was well received by critics and described as "less crude and immediate" than the previous work. In early 2010, Favero left the band, while multi-instrumentalist Nicola Manzan (guitar, violin, synth) and Tommaso Mantelli on bass both joined.

In June the band took the stage at the MTV Day 2010. In March 2011, on his Facebook page, Capovilla announced the departure of drummer Valente and the sacking of guitarist Manzan and bassist Mantelli. No info is given about replacements, except for the return to bass by Favero. 22 July 2011 Favero announced on Facebook that the band was to start the recording of their third album with their original line-up. On 25 November 2011 the band announced the release of Il mondo nuovo scheduled for 31 January 2012. The album consists of 16 tracks, for a total duration of almost 70 minutes; In March 2012, the group went on tour to promote the album.

The group's fourth, self-titled album was released on October 2, 2015, this time with an expanded lineup of six members, including former session musicians Batelli and Laca. Following the album's release, a tour began, but was interrupted at the end of 2016, canceling dates scheduled for the following year for unspecified personal reasons. At this point, the group's activity ceased, and the band remained in a state of inactivity.

On June 14, 2020, in a post on the Facebook group associated with the band's official page, Pierpaolo Capovilla declared that Il Teatro degli Orrori had ceased to exist for several years, without, however, specifying the reasons.

On October 15, 2024, the band announced their reunion via social media, announcing the "Mai Dire Mai Tour" (Never Say Never Tour) for 2025, a nine-date tour across Italy, nine years after their last concert.

== Band members ==
- Pierpaolo Capovilla – voice (since 2005)
- Gionata Mirai – guitar (since 2005)
- Giulio Ragno Favero – bass (2005–2010 and since 2011)
- Francesco Valente – drums (since 2005)

=== Former members ===
- Tommaso Mantelli – bass (2010–2011)
- Nicola Manzan – guitar (2010–2011)

== Discography ==
=== Studio albums ===
- Dell'impero delle tenebre (2007)
- A sangue freddo (2009)
- Il mondo nuovo (2012)
- Il Teatro degli Orrori (2015)

=== Live albums ===
- Dal vivo (2012)

=== EPs ===
- Il Teatro degli Orrori/Zu (2008)
- Raro (2010)
