= The Way of the Animal Powers =

Studio album by Zu
- Released: 2005
- Genre: Experimental rock
- Label: Xeng Records

Zu chronology
Radiale (2004)	The Way of the Animal Powers (2005)	How to Raise an Ox (2005)

The Way of the Animal Powers is the sixth studio album by Italian band Zu, released in 2005, within the collaboration of Fred Lonberg-Holm on cello. Originally released 2004 as a three band split CD Eccentrics, Issue #1 (Hinterlandt/Zu/Can Can Heads) by TenZenMen.

== Track list ==
1. Tom Araya Is Our Elvis
2. Anatomy of a Lost Battle
3. Shape Shifting
4. The Aftermath
5. Things Fall Apart
6. The Witch Herbalist of Remote Town
7. Farewell to the Species
8. A Fortress Against Shadows
9. Every Seagull Knows
