= Bologna Violenta (album) =

Studio album by Bologna Violenta
- Released: 2006
- Genre: Noise, industrial, electronic, grindcore
- Label: SKP Records, self-produced

Bologna Violenta chronology
Bologna Violenta (2006)	Il Nuovissimo Mondo (2010)

Bologna Violenta is the first self-titled studio album by the Italian one man band Bologna Violenta, released in 2006.

The album is self-produced and was printed in 1200 copies, the distribution was given to SKP Records and Noisecult Records. The titles of the songs are inspired by the poliziottesco movies of the 1970s.

In the booklet of the album is the text-poem "A different picture of a city seemingly happy and friendly" dedicated, as the rest of the album, to the hidden violent side of the city of Bologna.

== Track listing ==
1. Città violenta
2. Il cittadino si ribella
3. Corruzione al Palazzo di Giustizia
4. Paura in città
5. Violenza contro la violenza
6. Bologna trema, la polizia può sparare
7. La violenza, quinto potere
8. Bologna odia
9. Bologna, l'altra faccia della violenza
10. La via della droga
11. Bologna rovente
12. Bologna drogata, la polizia non può intervenire
13. Bologna centrale del vizio
14. I violenti di bologna bene
15. Bologna difendersi o morire
16. Bologna spara!
17. Bologna calibro 9
18. Bologna nera
19. Bologna a mano armata
20. Provincia violenta
21. La morte risale a ieri sera (i bolognesi ammazzano il sabato)
22. I padroni della città
23. Puttane a Bologna (Bologna come Budapest)
24. La città sconvolta, caccia spietata ai rapitori
25. Bologna si ribella
26. Bologna, ultimo atto
27. Tira la boccia
