= Carboniferous (album) =

Studio album by Zu
- Released: February 17, 2009
- Genre: Experimental metal
- Label: Ipecac

Zu chronology
Zu/Xabier Iriondo/Damo Suzuki (2008)	Carboniferous (2009)

Professional ratings
Aggregate scores
Source	Rating
Metacritic	83/100
Review scores
Source	Rating
AllMusic	4/5 stars
Alternative Press	4/5 stars
The Boston Phoenix	3/4 stars
Cokemachineglow	75%
Drowned in Sound	8/10
The Line of Best Fit	72%
Mojo	4/5 stars
NME	8/10
Pitchfork	8.0/10
Tiny Mix Tapes	4/5 stars

Carboniferous is a studio album from the Italian band Zu. It was the group's first album for Ipecac Records.

== Reception ==
Initial critical response to Carboniferous was very positive. At Metacritic, which assigns a normalized rating out of 100 to reviews from mainstream critics, the album has received an average score of 83, based on ten reviews.

== Track listing ==
1. "Ostia" – 4:55
2. "Chthonian" – 6:48 (feat. King Buzzo)
3. "Carbon" – 4:24
4. "Beata Viscera" – 3:57
5. "Erinys" – 3:43
6. "Soulympics" – 5:05 (feat. Mike Patton)
7. "Axion" – 5:21
8. "Mimosa Hostilis" – 4:09
9. "Obsidian" – 6:29
10. "Orc" – 5:20 (feat. Mike Patton)
