= Il Nuovissimo Mondo =

Studio album by Bologna Violenta
- Released: 2010
- Genre: Noise, industrial, avant-garde, electronic, grindcore
- Label: Bar La Muerte

Bologna Violenta chronology
| Bologna Violenta (2006) | Il Nuovissimo Mondo (2010) | Utopie e piccole soddisfazioni (2012) |

Il Nuovissimo Mondo (rough translation: The brand new world) is the second studio album by the Italian one man band Bologna Violenta of Nicola Manzan, released in 2010 by Bar La Muerte Records.

The album is inspired by the "mondo-movies" such as the cult-documentary of the 60s Mondo Cane by Paolo Cavara, and is full of quotations (expressed through the dialogue) that refer to the cynical atmosphere of these "mondo-movies," while there are also parts (Blue Song), which makes reference to melody.

There are no real songs, but short compositions alternating moments with heavy distorted guitar riffs and spoken parts which talk about the cynicism and violence of modern man—massacres of children, violence against women, politicians' abuses—while remaining far from political or religious ideologies.

After the release of Il Nuovissimo Mondo, Bologna Violenta went on a two-year tour which included one hundred and thirty dates, not only in Italy but also abroad.

The cover art shows a typical Italian version of an obituary, in which is depicted Nicola Manzan himself.

== Track list ==
1. Il nuovissimo mondo – 1:27
2. Morte – 0:25
3. Trapianti giapponesi – 2:12
4. Danze cecene – 1:05
5. El Grindo – 0:46
6. Un virus terrificante – 0:33
7. Le regine delle riviste porno – 0:29
8. Il sommo fallo – 0:44
9. Maledetta del demonio – 0:43
10. Chirurgia sociale – 0:56
11. Nudo e crudele – 1:33
12. Blue Song – 2:32
13. La donna nel mondo – 1:22
14. Mondo militia – 1:35
15. Il trionfo della morte – 1:21
16. La mattanza – 0:53
17. Il declino della musica contemporanea – 0:49
18. Un Paese pietoso – 0:40
19. Stronzi – 0:26
20. Una buona cosa – 0:51
21. Sono diventati tutti mostri – 0:58
22. Pistola e dare ordini – 1:22
23. L’uomo: ultimo atto? – 1:17
