= Bromio =

Studio album by Zu
- Released: 1999
- Genre: Experimental rock
- Length: 35:24
- Label: Wide Records, Southern Records

Zu chronology
Bromio (1999)	The Zu Side of the Chadbourne (2000)

Bromio is the first album by the Italian experimental rock band Zu, released in 1999.

== Track list ==
1. Detonatore - 3:36
2. Xenitis - 3:12
3. Testa di Cane - 3:06
4. Paonazzi - 1:20
5. Zu Circus - 3:42
6. Asmodeo - 4:06
7. Cane Maggiore - 3:25
8. Epidurale - 1:52
9. Villa Belmonte - 2:55
10. Erotomane - 4:26
11. La Grande Madre Delle Bestie - 5:44
