= Igneo =

Studio album by Zu
- Released: 2002
- Genre: Experimental rock, Jazz Fusion
- Length: 40:03
- Label: Wallace records
- Producer: Steve Albini

Zu chronology
Motorhellington (2001)	Igneo (2002)	Live in Helsinki (2003)

Igneo is the fourth album by Italian band Zu, involving Ken Vandermark on sax, Jeb Bishop on trombone, Fred Lonberg-Holm on cello and Jacopo Battaglia on drums .

The record was produced by Steve Albini.

== Track list ==
1. The Elusive Character Of Victory - 2:18
2. Solar Anus - 3:52
3. Eli, Eli, Elu - 6:27
4. Arbol De La Esperanza Mantente Firme - 2:31
5. Monte Zu - 4:55
6. Untitled Samba For Kat Ex - 2:16
7. Muro Torto - 5:02
8. Tikkun Olam - 2:12
9. Mar Glaciale Artico - 10:29
