= How to Raise an Ox =

Studio album by Zu, Mats Gustafsson
- Released: 2006
- Studio: Locomotive Studio, Rome, Italy (10/2004)
- Genre: Experimental rock, free jazz
- Label: Atavistic Records, Touch and Go

Zu, Mats Gustafsson chronology
The Way of the Animal Powers (2005)	How to Raise an Ox (2006)	Zu/Dälek (2005)

How to Raise an Ox is the seventh studio album by Italian band Zu, released in 2006, in collaboration with Mats Gustafsson on saxophone.

== Track listing ==
1. Over a Furnace
2. How to Raise an Ox
3. Eating the Landscape
4. King Devours His Sons
5. Bring the War Back Home
6. Meat Eater, Solar Bird
7. Palace of Reptiles
8. Beasts Only Die to Be Born
9. Tiger Teaches the Lamb

== Personnel ==
- Mats Gustafsson (baritone saxophone)
- Luca (baritone saxophone)
- Massimo (bass guitar)
- Jacopo (drums)
