= The Zu Side of the Chadbourne =

Studio album by Zu, Eugene Chadbourne
- Released: 2000
- Genre: Experimental rock
- Length: 49:24
- Label: Felmay Records

Zu, Eugene Chadbourne chronology
| Bromio (1999) | The Zu Side of the Chadbourne (2000) | Motorhellington (2001) |

The Zu Side Of The Chadbourne is the second album by the Italian band Zu, featuring Roy Paci on trumpet and Eugene Chadbourne on guitar.

The titles of the songs are obvious parodies of famous rock songs like Lucy in the sky with diamonds or Stairway to Heaven. The first song is a tribute to John Coltrane, and the last to Albert Ayler.

== Track list ==
1. Cosmos – 5:16
2. Chadbourne In The Sky With Diamonds – 7:08
3. Somewhere Over The Chadbourne – 1:38
4. Porgy and Chadbourne – 6:47
5. Holiday in Chadbournia – 1:10
6. Ascenseur pour the Chadbourne – 5:00
7. In a Gadda Na Chadbourne – 7:47
8. O' Chadbourne mio! – 1:49
9. House of The Raising Chadbourne – 4:05
10. Stairway to Chadbourne – 1:53
11. For Those About to Chadbourne – 2:21
12. Everybody Needs a Chadbourne (To Love) – 1:13
13. Spirits – 5:17
