= Motorhellington =

Studio album by Zu, Eugene Chadbourne
- Released: 2000
- Genre: Experimental rock
- Length: 49:24
- Label: Felmay Records

Zu, Eugene Chadbourne chronology
The Zu Side of the Chadbourne (2000)	Motorhellington (2000)	Igneo (2002)

Motorhellington is the third album by the Italian band Zu, which appear in Roy Paci on trumpet and backing vocals and Eugene Chadbourne on guitar and vocals.

== Track list ==
1. Iron Man – 8:45
2. The Robots – 5:29
3. Chain of Fools – 7:07
4. Boogie Stop Shuffle – 8:18
5. Corcovado – 7:16
6. Pushin' Too Hard – 5:22
7. Sex Machine – 6:37
8. Sacrifice – 3:06
