= Iceburn =

US musical group

- Origin: Salt Lake City, Utah, United States
- Genres: Post-hardcore; Alternative metal Alternative rock Avant-garde metal Math rock Jazz fusion
- Years active: 1991–2000
- Labels: Victory, Revelation
- Past members: Gentry Densley, Doug Wright, Dan Day, James Holder, Joseph Chad Smith aka Chubba, Jeremy Chatelain, Greg Nielsen, Aaron Hansen, Jared Russel, Josh Dixon, Chris Hill, Ed Rodriguez, Chad Poppel, Cache Tolman, Adam Lane, Austin Booth

Iceburn, known later as the Iceburn Collective, was a musical group formed in 1991 in Salt Lake City, Utah, US, by guitarist/vocalist/composer Gentry Densley, the sole constant member through multiple personnel changes. They were known for their unique style that combined elements of jazz, heavy metal, punk, and classical music. Releasing albums on Revelation Records and Victory Records, Iceburn achieved little mainstream attention, but earned critical praise for their unusual music.

== Band history ==
Their early output could be classified as jazzcore, blending the speed and energy of hardcore punk and metal with the intricacy of jazz and progressive rock. For their first few years and albums, Iceburn were, for the most part, a classic "power trio" of guitar, bass guitar and drums.

Around 1996, with the release of Meditavolutions, a 70-minute continuous piece in the form of a musical palindrome, the band began to go by the name the Iceburn Collective, to reflect the dynamic nature of the group's membership. The lineup expanded with a saxophonist, percussionist on conga drums, and a second guitarist. Critic Bret Love writes of the album, "the eclectic sound of this Utah-based septet flows so seamlessly that it may take a few songs before you realize you've never heard anything quite like it."

The band gradually introduced more and more improvisation. By the time they disbanded in about 2000, Iceburn was a completely improvised avant-garde jazz unit, featuring saxophone and other woodwind instruments.

Densley went on to participate in Ascend, a collaboration with Greg Anderson.

Most of their albums featured artwork by Californian Rich Jacobs.

Iceburn reunited for one concert in February 2007 to celebrate the 18th anniversary of Slug Mag (Salt Lake Underground, devoted to local music and arts), a longtime booster for Iceburn and Densely's music.

== Discography ==
=== Albums ===
- Firon (1992), Victory Records
- Hephaestus (1993), Revelation Records
- Iceburn/Engine Kid split cd/12" (1994), Revelation Records
- Poetry of Fire (1994), Revelation Records
- Meditavolutions (1996), Revelation Records
- Polar Bear Suite (1997), Iceburn Records/Revelation Records
- Power of the Lion (1998), Iceburn Records/Revelation Records (Reissued on vinyl by Southern Lord in 2009)
- Speed of Light Voice of Thunder (1999), Iceburn Records
- Land of Wind and Ghosts (2000), Mountain Collective Records MTN-CIA
- Asclepius (2021), Southern Lord

=== Singles ===
- Burn b/w Fall, Victory Records
- Moon b/w Brew No. 9, Art Monk Construction
- Leos 12", Lionhead Records
- Zu/Iceburn - PhonoMetak 10" Series No. 1, Odin's Beard 10" split with Zu (2006), Wallace Records (Italy)
