= Nobukazu Takemura =

Japanese musician & artist (born 1968)

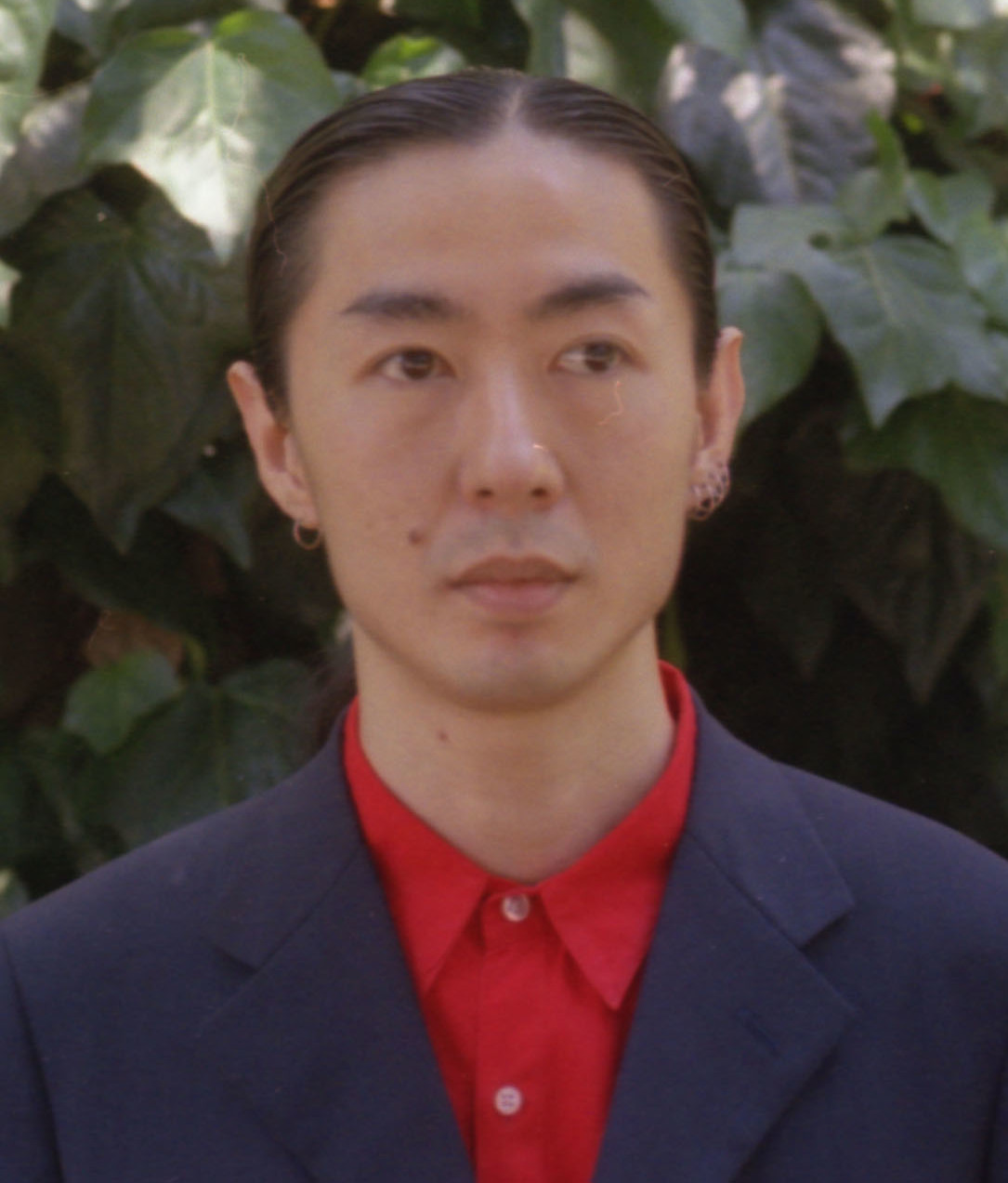

Background information
- Also known as: Child's View, Assembler, DJ Takemura
- Born: 28 August 1968 (age 57); Hirakata, Osaka Japan
- Origin: Kyoto, Japan
- Genres: Electronica, trip hop, glitch, nu jazz, chamber music, ambient
- Occupations: Musician, artist, DJ
- Years active: 1990–present
- Website: Nobukazu Takemura Official site

Nobukazu Takemura (竹村延和 Takemura Nobukazu; born August 28, 1968, in Hirakata, Osaka) is a Japanese musician and artist. He became interested in music at a young age by listening to the radio, and began to make music at home with a tape recorder and keyboard. During high school, after a record store job that exposed him to jazz and hip-hop, he had regular gigs in the clubs of Osaka and Kyoto as a battle DJ before launching his music career. Takemura's music career has seen him cover a wide range of genres and styles within short periods of time. Beginning his career in hip-hop and jazz, Takemura later entered into a prolific period as an electronic musician, exploring genres such as glitch, drum and bass and minimalism. Takemura's most recent work has included chamber music and performance art.

== Career ==
In 1990, Takemura founded the instrumental hip hop group Audio Sports with Yamatsuka Eye (of Boredoms) and Aki Onda. Their first album, Era of Glittering Gas, was released in 1992 (after which Onda subsequently took control of the project).

In 1992, Takemura formed the nu-jazz collective Spiritual Vibes, which released several albums and a few singles throughout the early to mid-1990s. During this period Takemura would occasionally toy with (and eventually pursue full-time in the late 1990s) his own solo releases, typically under the names of DJ Takemura or Kool Jazz Productions. He has released music under the pseudonyms of DJ Takemura, Child's View and Assembler, and his music has covered a wide variety of genres in a short amount of time, ranging from hip-hop instrumentals, to jazz, to chamber music and electronic minimalism, breakbeat, noise pop, glitch and jungle music. The vast majority of Takemura's music has been recorded in his home-made "Moonlit Studio", in his Kyoto apartment.

He founded the Lollop and Childisc labels in the 1990s after meeting musicians who were unable to release their music due to not having a record label. His voluminous releases, remixes, and collaborations make a comprehensive discography difficult, and his music often defies any easy categorization. Takemura's first U.S. release was Funfair on the Bubble Core label in 1998, a slightly altered release of the Yoru No Yuenchi album released previously in Japan. This was followed by Scope on the Thrill Jockey label in 1999, an album that was released solely in the U.S. He has frequently collaborated with fellow Childisc vocalist/composer Aki Tsuyuko, with her vocals having been sampled on many of his albums.

His unique and complex approach to melody and instrumentation has generated a catalog of collaborations with critically acclaimed artists including Issey Miyake, Zu, Steve Reich, DJ Spooky, Yo La Tengo, Tortoise, and Tujiko Noriko. Takemura performed live extensively in the early 2000s, having toured the U.S. opening for Tortoise and Plaid, as well as touring the U.K. with a full live band playing his music on a sponsorship from the British Arts Council. Takemura was also responsible for the sound design of Sony's robotic dog AIBO.

Takemura moved from his long-term home of Kyoto to Berlin, Germany in 2008. In February 2014, Takemura released Zeitraum, a compilation of music, sounds and images he had created from 2004 – 2013 for various projects, commissions and collaborations. Zeitraum is Takemura's first solo album release in 11 years.

== Discography ==
Note: This discography only includes solo and collaboration releases under the names of "Nobukazu Takemura", "Child's View", "Assembler" or "DJ Takemura". None of Takemura's group releases, such as with Audio Sports or Spiritual Vibes, are included.

=== Studio albums ===
Year	Title	Album details
1994	Child's View	Released: 2 November 1994; Label: Toy's Factory (JP) / Bellissima Records (GER); Formats: LP, CD
1997	Child and Magic	Released: 15 December 1997; Label: Warner Music Japan (JP); Formats: CD
1998	Yoru No Yuenchi	As Child's View; Released: 1998; Label: Childisc (JP); Formats: CD
1999	Funfair	As Child's View; Released: March 1999; Label: Bubble Core Records (US); Formats: CD; U.S. version of Yoru No Yuenchi with slightly altered tracklist
1999	Milano: For Issey Miyake Men By Naoki Takizawa	Released: 26 May 1999; Label: Warner Music Japan (JP); Formats: CD
1999	Scope	Released: 9 June 1999; Label: Thrill Jockey (US); Formats: LP, CD
1999	Finale: For Issey Miyake Men By Naoki Takizawa	Released: 22 December 1999; Label: Warner Music Japan (JP); Formats: CD
2000	Meteor	Released: 2000; Label: Childisc (JP); Format: CD; Was released in U.S. as a 12" single instead of an album
2000	Hoshi No Koe	Released: 2000; Label: Childisc (JP) / Thrill Jockey (US); Formats: LP, CD; Japan and U.S. versions had one different track on each
2000	Sign	Released: November 2000; Label: Tokuma Japan Communications (JP) / Thrill Jockey (US); Formats: LP, CD; Japan and U.S. versions had some differing tracks
2001	Songbook	Released: 21 December 2001; Label: Childisc (JP) / Bubble Core Records (US); Formats: LP, CD; Japan and U.S. versions had different tracklistings
2002	Assembler 1	As Assembler; Released: 13 March 2002; Label: Childisc (JP); Formats: CD
2002	Animate	Released: 13 March 2002; Label: Childisc (JP); Formats: CD
2002	10th	Released: 24 July 2002; Label: Childisc (JP) / Thrill Jockey (US); Formats: LP, CD; Japan version had one extra track
2002	Water's Suite	Released: 2002; Label: Extreme (AUS); Formats: CD
2003	Assembler 2	As Assembler; Released: 30 May 2003; Label: Moonlit (JP) / Thrill Jockey (US); Formats: CD; Japan version had an extra live bonus track
2003	Etude	Released: 2003; Label: En/Of (GER); Formats: LP; Limited edition of 100 vinyls
2007	Kobito No Kuni (Unreleased Tracks up to 1999)	Released: 21 December 2007; Label: Moonlit (JP); Formats: CD
2014	Zeitraum	Released: 26 February 2014; Labels: Happenings (JP); Formats: CD
2015	Einheit	Released: 5 December 2015; Labels: Happenings (JP); Formats: CD; Exclusively sold at Hotel Anteroom in Kyoto for a Takemura art exhibition.

=== Extended plays ===
Year	Title	Album details
1993	The Quest is a Reward	Released: 1993; Label: NEC Avenue (JP); Formats: CD
1998	Sablé & Grill EP	As Child's View; Released: 1998; Label: Childisc (JP); Formats: CD, 12"; The CD version had one more track than the 12"
2001	Recursion EP	Released: 2001; Label: Childisc (JP); Formats: 12"
2002	Animate EP	Released: 2002; Label: Childisc (JP); Formats: 12"
2002	Mimic Robot	Released: 2002; Label: Thrill Jockey (US); Formats: 12"

=== Singles ===
Year	Title	Album details
1992	Hoping For The Sun / Kool Jazz Scene / Science Fiction	As DJ Takemura; Released: 1992; Label: Global Dept Records (UK); Formats: 12"
1994	For Tomorrow	Released: 1994; Label: Toy's Factory (JP) / 99 Records (GER) / Bellissima Records (GER); Formats: 12", CD
1999	The Cradle of Light / After Image	As Child's View; Released: 1999; Label: Childisc (JP); Formats: 12"
1999	Meteor	Released: 1999; Label: Thrill Jockey (US); Formats: 12"; U.S. single version of the Meteor album
2001	Mahou No Hiroba	Released: 21 November 2001; Label: Childisc (JP); Formats: CD
2001	Picnic / Oyasumi	Released: 2001; Label: Bottrop-Boy (GER); Formats: 7"
2002	Hiking / Viking	Released: 2002; Label: Bottrop-Boy (GER); Formats: 7"

=== Collaborative albums ===
Year	Title	Album details
1997	Changing Hands	With Richard Barbieri & Steve Jansen; Released: 16 July 1997; Label: Flavour of Sound (JP); Formats: CD
2003	Turntables and Computers	With Otomo Yoshihide; Released: 6 November 2003; Label: Headz; Formats: CD
2007	Identification With the Enemy: A Key To the Underworld	With Zu; Released: 2007; Label: Atavistic; Formats: CD
2012	East Facing Balcony	With Tujiko Noriko; Released: 6 June 2012; Label: Happenings; Formats: CD
