= Zu (band) =

Italian instrumental music band

- Origin: Rome, Italy
- Genres: Progressive rock; math rock; avant-garde metal; industrial; ambient; drone; electronic
- Years active: 1997–present
- Members: Massimo Pupillo; Luca T. Mai; Paolo Mongardi
- Past members: Gabe Serbian; Tomas Järmyr; Jacopo Battaglia
- Website: zuism.net

Zu is an Italian instrumental band from Rome. While their line-up of baritone sax, bass guitar and drums is typical of a jazz band, their hard-driving sound is indebted to punk rock and according to AllMusic "defies easy categorization". Zu have collaborated with a wide variety of musicians and been described as "masters at adapting to their guests' musical backgrounds".

== Name ==
The name of the band, Zu, comes from the Sumerian term zu 𒍪, identifying the "life force of consciousness", the same root of the name of the Neopagan new religious movement of Zuism (Mesopotamian/Middle Eastern Neopaganism).

== History ==
Hailing from Ostia (a neighbourhood of Rome), Zu are an atypical trio consisting of drums, bass, baritone saxophone and electronics. Formed in Rome in 1997, they began as composers and performers for theater productions. The band is composed of three members: Luca Mai on baritone saxophone, Massimo Pupillo on bass and Paolo Mongardi on drums.

Zu have released fourteen albums, including two live albums and two splits. They have played at festivals in Europe, America, Asia and Africa. In 2006, the band toured with the super group Fantômas Melvins Big Band.

They have also collaborated with Romeo castellucci and Societas Raffaello Sanzio for Vexilla Regis Prodeunt Inferni zu-e-societas-raffaello-sanzio

== Style ==
Zu's music is instrumental and features virtuosic drumming, powerful bass and distorted saxophone. Many of the band's albums are billed as collaborations with a guest musician (such as Mike Patton, Buzz Osborne, Mats Gustafsson and Nobukazu Takemura). Often, a collaborator will join them at live performances as well. Members of the band also collaborate with other musical projects, many of which exist only as live performances.

== Reception ==
John Zorn described the band as creating "a powerful and expressive music that totally blows away what most bands do these days".

In 2009, Carboniferous was voted Album of the Year in Rock-A-Rolla magazine's Best of 2009 poll.

== Personnel ==
- Luca T. Mai – baritone saxophone and electronics
- Massimo Pupillo – bass
- Paolo Mongardi – drums

=== Ex-members ===
- Gabe Serbian – drums
- Tomas Järmyr – drums
- Jacopo Battaglia – drums

=== Major collaborators ===
- Eugene Chadbourne – guitar on The Zu Side of the Chadbourne and Motorhellington
- Jeb Bishop – trombone on Igneo
- Mats Gustafsson – saxophones on How to Raise an Ox
- Xabier Iriondo – on Zu / Iceburn
- Fred Lonberg-Holm – cello on The Way of the Animal Powers
- Nobukazu Takemura – electronics on Identification with the Enemy – A Key to the Underworld
- Spaceways inc. – on Radiale
- Mike Patton – vocals on some live dates and Carboniferous
- Ken Vandermark – saxophones on Igneo and Radiale
- Buzz Osborne – on Carboniferous
- Balázs Pándi – drums on 2011 tour
- Eugene Robinson – vocals on The Left Hand Path
- David Tibet – vocals on Mirror Emperor
- Damo Suzuki – vocals on some live dates
- Stefano Pilia – cello and guitar on Jhator, cello guitar and production on Mirror Emperor, 2018 /2020 live dates
- Okapi – electronics on Zu / Dalek / Okapi and on some live dates

== Discography ==
- 1999: Bromio
- 2000: The Zu Side of the Chadbourne
- 2001: Motorhellington
- 2002: Igneo
- 2003: Live in Helsinki
- 2004: Radiale
- 2004: Eccentrics, Issue #1 Hinterlandt / Zu / Can Can Heads
- 2005: The Way of the Animal Powers
- 2005: How to Raise an Ox
- 2005: Zu/Dälek feat Økapi
- 2006: Rai Sanawachi Koe Wo Hassu
- 2006: Zu / Iceburn – PhonoMetak 10" Series No. 1
- 2007: Identification with the Enemy: A Key to the Underworld
- 2008: Il Teatro degli Orrori/Zu
- 2008: Zu/Xabier Iriondo/Damo Suzuki – PhonoMetak 10" Series No. 4
- 2009: Carboniferous
- 2014: Goodnight Civilization EP
- 2014: Zu & Eugene Robinson – The Left Hand Path
- 2015: Cortar Todo
- 2017: Jhator
- 2018: ZU93 Mirror Emperor
- 2019: Terminalia Amazonia
- 2025: RuinsZu jazzIsDead
- 2026: Ferrum Sidereum

=== Singles and music videos ===
- "Carbon" (2009)
- "Soulympics" (2009)
- "Orc" (2010)
- "Goodnight, Civilization" (2014)
- "Cortar Todo" (2015)
- "Conflict Acceleration" (2015)
- "Golgotha" (2025)
- "A.I. Hive Mind" (2025)
