= Gentry Densley =

American singer, guitarist, and songwriter

- Origin: Salt Lake City, Utah, U.S.
- Genres: Punk; metal; experimental
- Occupations: Musician; singer; songwriter
- Instrument: Guitar
- Member of: Eagle Twin
- Formerly of: Iceburn

Gentry Densley is an American singer, guitarist, and songwriter. A longtime fixture on Salt Lake City's punk, metal, and experimental music scenes, Densley has been involved in numerous bands but is best known for leading the groups Iceburn, Ascend, and Eagle Twin. Critic Gregory Heaney describes him as "One of music's great scientists".

== Biography ==
A Salt Lake City native, Densley is a graduate of the University of Utah in music composition. His first notable group was Iceburn (1991–2001), which initially started as a punk/metal power trio with progressive rock flourishes before moving into free jazz and free improvisation. During the Iceburn era, Densley became friends with Greg Anderson; Iceburn released a split EP with Anderson's group Engine Kid before Anderson formed of Goatsnake and Sunn O))). The pair later collaborated in the experimental doom metal project Ascend.

In 2007 Densley formed Eagle Twin, who released their debut on Southern Lord Recordings in 2009.

His younger brother, Tyler Densley, was the singer for hardcore band Lewd Acts.
