= Bologna Violenta =

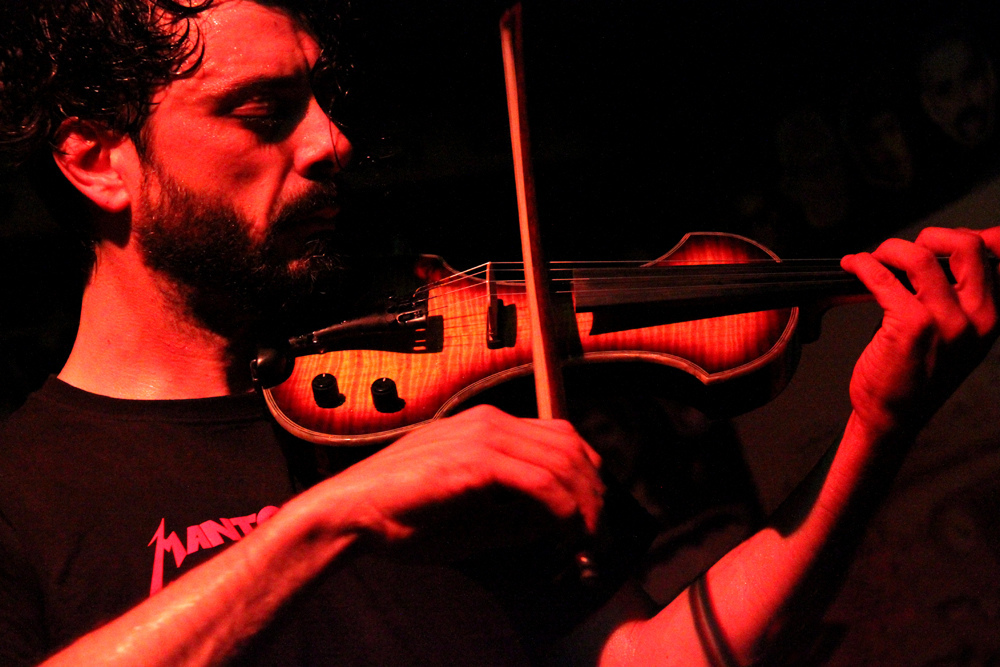
- Nicola Manzan founder of Bologna Violenta in 2010

Background information
- Origin: Italy
- Genres: Noise, electrogrind, speedcore, instrumental, digitalcore, industrial
- Years active: 2005–present
- Website: www.bolognaviolenta.com

Bologna Violenta is a one man band musical project founded by Nicola Manzan in 2005.

== Biography ==
Nicola Manzan (Treviso, 2 March 1976) is a multi-instrumentalist graduated in violin.

In 2005, he started the musical project Bologna Violenta by publishing the eponymous digital EP published in free download on the French label Core:Back Records. In 2006, he published his first album titled Bologna Violenta, consists of 27 tracks, in which the securities are inspired by the Italian poliziottesco movies of the 1970s. The debut album melody is completely absent, to lord it are heavy distorted guitar riffs.

In 2010, he released his second studio album, entitled Il Nuovissimo Mondo for Bar La Muerte. This album marks a significant turning point in the first style of music. The album, inspired by the "mondo-movies" such as the cult-documentary of the 1960s Mondo Cane by Paolo Cavara, and is full of quotations (expressed through the dialogues) that refer to the cynical atmosphere of these "mondo-movies," while there are also parts which makes reference to melody. After the release of Il Nuovissimo Mondo, Bologna Violenta aside for a two-year tour which counted one hundred and thirty dates not only in Italy but also abroad.

On January 27, 2012, is issued for Wallace Records, Dischi Bervisti and distributed by Audioglobe, the third studio album, Utopie e piccole soddisfazioni. The album, containing 21 tracks that are devoid of movie quotes, is characterized by a complete background noise ranging from pure classical music. Some pieces are sung: the voices are J. Randall of Agoraphobic Nosebleed and Aimone Romizi of Fast Animals And Slow Kids.

During his career, Nicola Manzan worked with many members of the Italian independent music scene. The two experiences that have given most famous were those by live sideman with Baustelle and Il Teatro degli Orrori, as a second guitarist and violinist.

== Personnel ==
- Nicola Manzan - guitar, violin, electronics

== Discography ==
- Bologna Violenta (2006)
- Il Nuovissimo Mondo (2010)
- Utopie e piccole soddisfazioni (2012)
- Uno Bianca (2014)
- Discordia (Overdrive/Dischi Bervisti) (2016)
- Bancarotta Morale (Overdrive/Dischi Bervisti) (2020)

== See also ==
- Bologna
- Industrial music
- Mondo Cane
- Noise Music
