= The Tempest (Giorgione) =

Painting by Giorgione

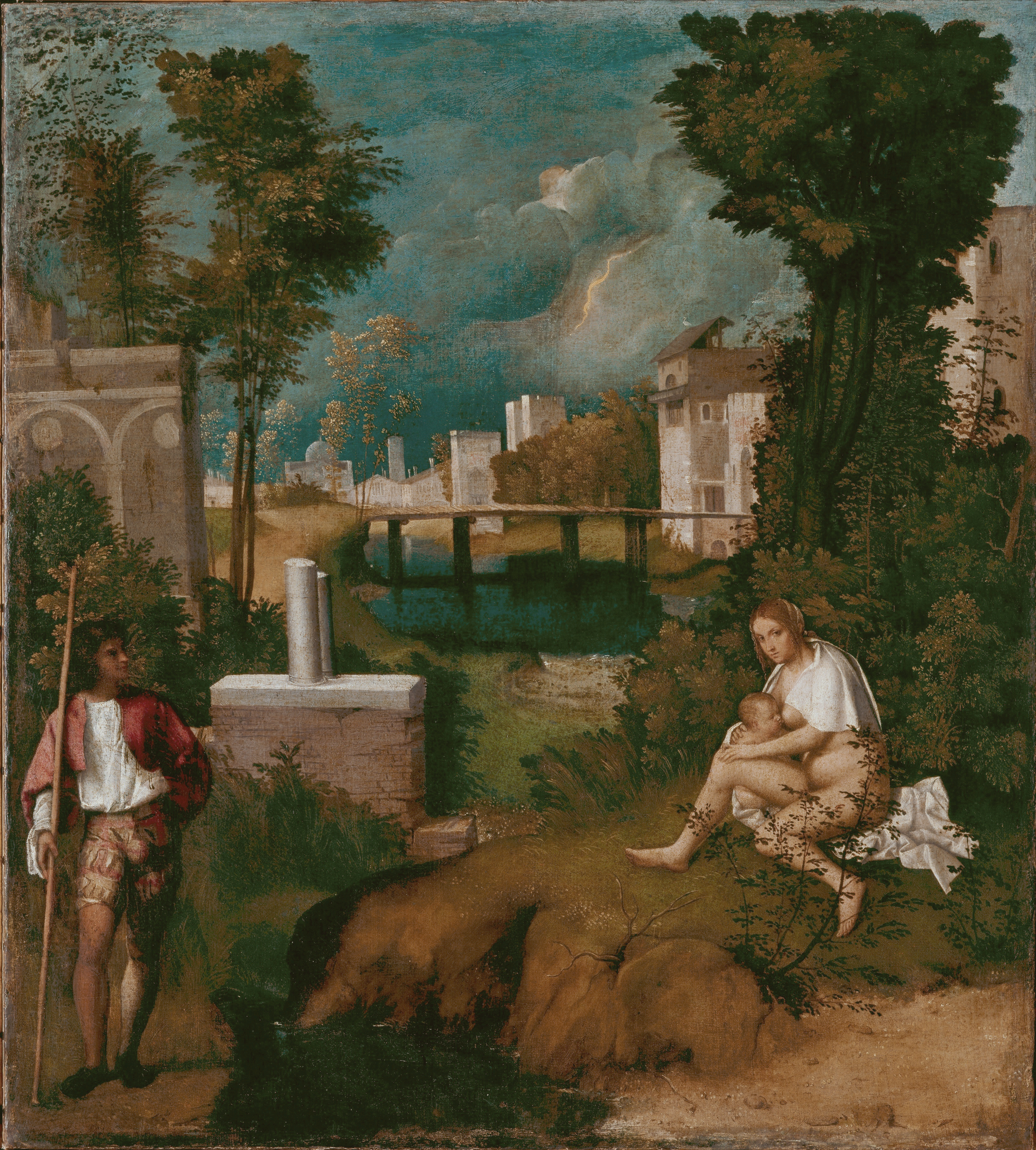
- Artist: Giorgione
- Year: c. 1508
- Medium: oil on canvas
- Dimensions: 83 cm × 73 cm (33 in × 29 in)
- Location: Gallerie dell'Accademia, Venice

The Tempest (Italian La Tempesta) is a Renaissance painting by the Italian master Giorgione dated between 1506 and 1508. Originally commissioned by the Venetian noble Gabriele Vendramin, the painting is now in the Gallerie dell'Accademia of Venice, Italy. Despite considerable discussion by art historians, the meaning of the scene remains elusive.

== Description and interpretations ==
On the right a woman sits, nursing a baby. The woman has been described as a gypsy since at least 1530, and in Italy, the painting is also known as La Zingara e il Soldato ("The Gypsy Woman and the Soldier"), or as La Zingarella e il Soldato ("The Gypsy Girl and the Soldier"). Her pose is unusual – normally the baby would be held on the mother's lap; but in this case the baby is positioned at the side of the mother, so as to expose her pubic area. A man, possibly a soldier, holding a long staff or pike, stands in contrapposto on the left. He smiles and glances to the left but does not appear to be looking at the woman. Art historians have identified the man alternatively as a soldier, a shepherd, a gypsy, or a member of a club of unmarried men. X-rays of the painting have revealed that in the place of the man, Giorgione originally painted another female nude. One may also note the stork on the rooftop on the right. Storks sometimes represent the love of parents for their children.

The painting's features seem to anticipate the storm. The colours are subdued and the lighting soft; greens and blues dominate. The landscape is a not a mere backdrop, but forms a notable contribution to early landscape painting. The painting has a "silent" atmosphere, which continues to fascinate modern viewers.

There is no contemporary textual explanation for The Tempest and, ultimately, no definitive reading or interpretation. To some it represents the flight into Egypt; to others, a scene from classical mythology (possibly Paris and Oenone; or Iasion and Demeter) or from an ancient Greek pastoral novel. According to the Italian scholar Salvatore Settis, the desert city would represent Paradise, the two characters being Adam and Eve with their son Cain, and the lightning, as in ancient Greek and Hebrew times, would represent God, who has just ousted them from Eden. Others have proposed a moral allegorical reading or concluded that Giorgione had no particular subject in mind.

In September, 1943, Professor Pasquale Rotondi, Central Inspector for the General Direction of the Arts, put it under his bed to hide it from German troops.

== Cultural references and reception ==
External videos
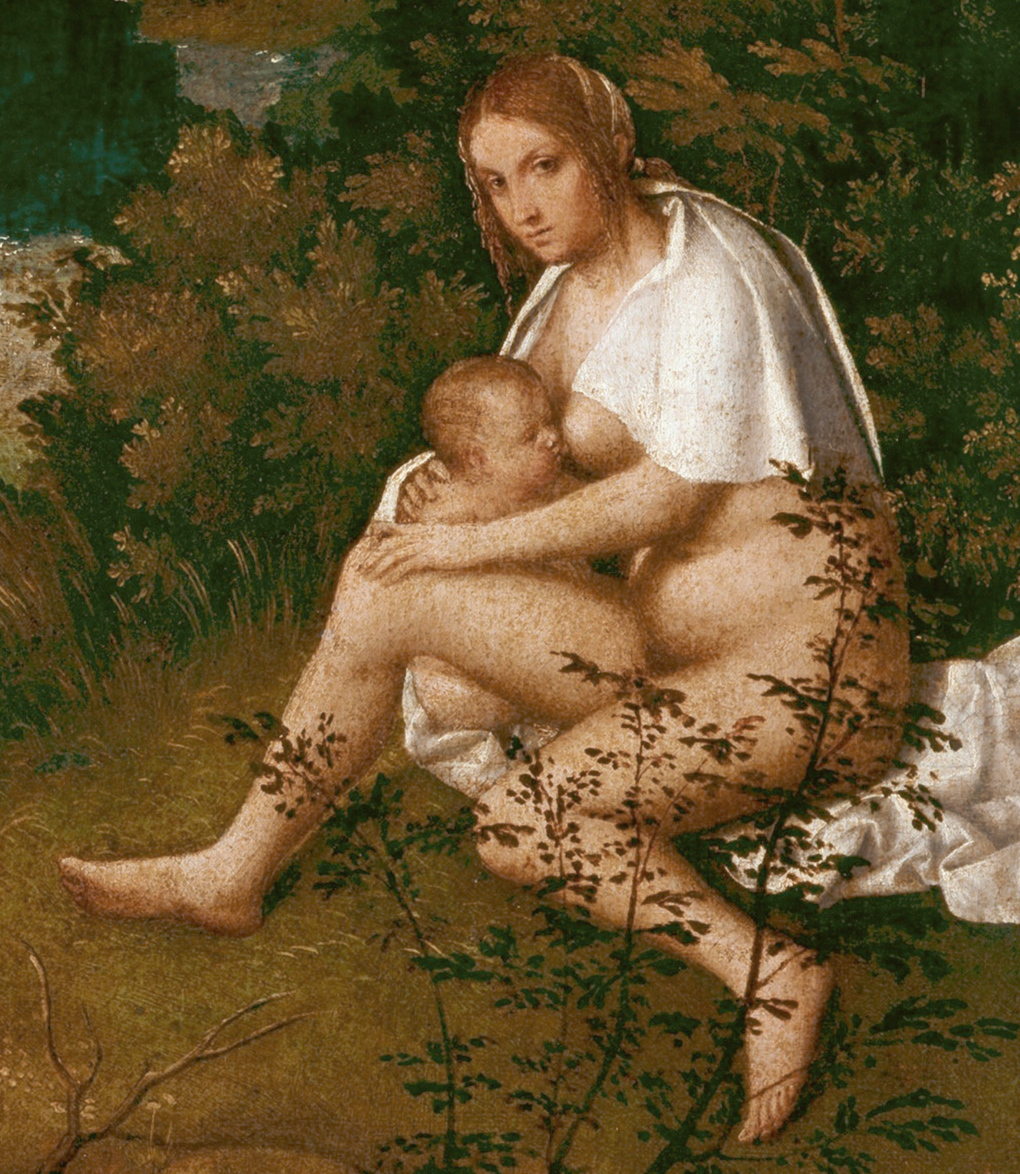
- Giorgione's The Tempest, c. 1506–8, Smarthistory

This was Lord Byron's favorite painting because the ambiguity of both its subject matter and symbolism allowed viewers to make up their own tale.

Jan Morris wrote that the picture changed the way she looked at painting. She was fascinated with the subject and "its sense of permanently suspended enigma", and calls it a "haunted picture", inhabited by the actual presence of the artist.

Hugues Dufourt composed a musical piece called La Tempesta d'après Giorgione where he wanted to "strip the timbre away from its subordinate or anecdotal character, like what Giorgione has done in terms of colour".

Czech poet Ladislav Novák wrote a poem called Giorgione's Tempest where Meister Eckhart explains its symbolism in a wealthy man's study. According to him, the man is a shepherd who represents Giorgione and the lady is a woman the painter loves, without hoping his love will be requited.

In Mark Helprin's 1991 novel A Soldier of the Great War the protagonist claims the painting as his favorite and it plays a central role in the plot. It is viewed by the main characters who visit the painting in Venice and is referred to several times throughout the novel.

The painting is at the centre of the plot in the novel La tempestad (English translation The Tempest, 2004) by the Spanish author Juan Manuel de Prada, winner of the 1997 Premio Planeta de Novela.

In Geoff Dyer's 2009 novel Jeff in Venice, Death in Varanasi, the protagonist, Jeff Atman, visits the Gallerie dell'Accademia specifically to view the painting, having read a description of it in Mary McCarthy's Venice Observed.

Geoff Dyer edits an edition (2001) of John Berger’s Selected Essays, in one of which (‘That Which Is Held’), Berger muses on time: “I am thinking in front of Giorgione’s Tempest and I want to begin with a quotation from Osip Mandelstam…”

In The Wake, by Neil Gaiman, the painting is depicted hanging in the dining room of the Dream King.

In A Book of Liszts: Variations on the Theme of Franz Liszt, by John Spurling, a fictionalized Franz Liszt and Marie d'Agoult discuss the meaning of The Tempest, which the narrator of the scene calls The Family of the Painter (pp. 94-96).
