= Ulver discography =

This is the discography for Norwegian avant-garde band Ulver.

== Albums ==
=== Studio albums ===
Title	Album details	Peak chart positions		
Title	Album details	NOR	FIN	ITA
Bergtatt – Et eeventyr i 5 capitler	Released: February 1995; Label: Head Not Found; Formats: CD, CS, LP, digital download	—	—	—
Kveldssanger	Released: March 1996; Label: Head Not Found; Formats: CD, CS, LP, digital download	—	—	—
Nattens madrigal	Released: 3 March 1997; Label: Century Media; Formats: CD, CS, LP, digital download	—	—	—
Themes from William Blake's The Marriage of Heaven and Hell	Released: 17 December 1998; Label: Jester Records; Formats: CD, CS, LP	—	—	—
Perdition City	Released: 26 March 2000; Label: Jester; Formats: CD, CS, LP, digital download	—	—	—
Blood Inside	Released: 6 June 2005; Label: Jester; Formats: CD, LP, digital download	—	—	—
Shadows of the Sun	Released: 1 October 2007; Label: Jester; Formats: CD, LP, digital download	—	—	—
Wars of the Roses	Released: 25 April 2011; Label: Kscope; Formats: CD, LP, digital download	17	30	—
Messe I.X–VI.X with Tromsø Chamber Orchestra	Released: 1 August 2013; Label: Jester; Formats: CD, LP, digital download	—	29	—
ATGCLVLSSCAP	Released: 22 January 2016; Label: House of Mythology; Formats: CD, CS, LP	26	45	—
The Assassination of Julius Caesar	Released: 7 April 2017; Label: House of Mythology; Formats: CD, LP	—	—	100
Flowers of Evil	Released: 28 August 2020; Label: House of Mythology; Formats: CD, LP	—	22	—
Scary Muzak	Released: 31 October 2021; Label: House of Mythology; Formats: CD, LP, CS	—	—	—
Liminal Animals	Released: 29 November 2024; Label: House of Mythology; Formats: CD, LP, CS	—	—	—
Neverland	Released: 31 December 2025; Label: House of Mythology; Formats: CD, LP	—	—	—
"—" denotes a recording that did not chart or was not released in that territory.

=== Video albums ===
Title	Album details	Peak chart positions
Title	Album details	FIN
The Norwegian National Opera	Released: 28 November 2011; Label: Jester, Kscope; Formats: DVD, Blu-ray	2

=== Live albums ===
Title	Album details
Live at Roadburn	Released: 12 April 2013; Label: Roadburn; Formats: CD, LP, digital download
The Norwegian National Opera	Released: 20 April 2013; Label: Jester, Kscope; Formats: CD, LP, digital download
Drone Activity	Released: 11 May 2019; Label: House of Mythology; Formats: CD, LP, digital download
Hexahedron (Live at Henie Onstad Kunstsenter)	Released: 20 August 2021; Label: House of Mythology; Formats: CD, LP, digital download
Grieghallen 20180528	Released: 2 February 2024; Label: House of Mythology; Formats: CD, LP, digital download

=== Soundtracks ===
Title	Album details
Lyckantropen Themes	Released: 26 November 2002; Label: Jester; Formats: CD, LP, digital download
Svidd neger	Released: 15 September 2003; Label: Jester; Formats: CD, LP, digital download
Riverhead	Released: 9 December 2016; Label: House of Mythology; Formats: CD, LP

=== Collaboration albums ===
Title	Album details
Terrestrials with Sunn O)))	Released: 3 February 2014; Label: Southern Lord; Formats: CD, LP, digital download

=== Cover albums ===
Title	Album details
Childhood's End	Released: 28 May 2012; Label: Kscope; Formats: CD, LP, digital download

=== Compilation albums ===
Title	Album details
The Trilogie – Three Journeyes Through the Norwegian Netherworlde	Released: April 1997; Label: Century Media; Formats: LP (box)
Teachings in Silence	Released: 30 November 2002; Label: Jester; Formats: CD, LP, digital download
Oddities & Rarities #1	Released: 2012; Label: Jester; Format: Digital download
Trolsk Sortmetall 1993-1997	Released: 2014; Label: Century Media; Formats: CD, LP, CS (box)

=== Remix albums ===
Title	Album details
1993–2003: 1st Decade in the Machines	Released: 29 April 2003; Label: Jester; Formats: CD, digital download

=== Demos ===
Title	Album details	Notes
Vargnatt	Released: 5 November 1993; Label: Self-released; Formats: CS, LP, CD	Originally self-released on cassette in 1994. Re-released on vinyl in 2003, 2009, 2021 and 2023. Re-released on CD in 2009 and 2023.

=== Split albums ===
Title	Album details	Notes
Ulverytternes kamp / Mourning	Released: 14 June 1994; Label: Necromantic Gallery Productions; Formats: 7"	Split single with Mysticum.

== Extended plays ==
Title	EP details
Metamorphosis	Released: 27 September 1999; Label: Jester; Formats: CD
Silence Teaches You How to Sing	Released: 3 September 2001; Label: Jester; Formats: CD
Silencing the Singing	Released: 4 December 2001; Label: Jester; Formats: CD
A Quick Fix of Melancholy	Released: 26 August 2003; Label: Jester; Formats: CD, LP, digital download
Sic Transit Gloria Mundi	Released: 11 November 2017; Label: Jester; Formats: Digital download

== Singles ==
Title	Release details
"February MMX"	Released: 28 February 2011; Label: Kscope; Formats: CD, digital download
Roadburn EP	Released: 12 April 2012; Label: Roadburn Festival; Formats: LP
"Russian Doll"	Released: 14 February 2020; Label: House of Mythology; Formats: Digital download
"Little Boy"	Released: 3 April 2020; Label: House of Mythology; Format: Digital download

== Music videos ==
Year	Title
2005	"It Is No Sound"
2012	"Magic Hollow"
2017	"Echo Chamber (Room Of Tears)"
2017	"Bring Out a your Dead"
2020	"Russian Doll"
2026	"Hollywood Babylon"

== Other appearances ==
Year	Title	Album	Ref.
1994	"Ulverytternes Kamp"	Diabolical Netherworld III (various artists)	
1997	"Soelen Gaaer Bag Aase Need"	Feuersturm (various artists)	
1997	"Synen"	Souvenirs From Hell (various artists)	
1998	"Hymn I"	Firestarter (various artists)	
1999	"Sworn (Revamped By Ulver At Endless Studios)"	Emperor - IX Equilibrium	
1999	"The Voice Of The Devil Plate 4"	UKS - Forum Of Contemporary Art No. 1 / 2 1999 (various artists)	
2002	"Untitled"	Lords Of Chaos - The History Of Occult Music (various artists)	
2002	"The Falcon Flies (Ulver Juxtaposition Remix)"	Hagalaz' Runedance - Urd - That Which Was	
2002	"Vowels"	Phases: The Dark Side Of Music (various artists)	
2003	"Denki No Numa (Frog Voice mix)"	Merzbow - Frog Remixed and Revisited	
2004	"In The Kingdom Of The Blind The One-Eyed Are Kings"	Tribute To Dead Can Dance - The Lotus Eaters (various artists)	
2004	"Uno", "Avhør", "Brødre", "Brødre Rev.", "Flukt", "Gravferd", "David Til Ulvene"	Uno (various artists soundtrack)	
2005	"Strange Ways"	Gods Of Thunder - Norwegian Tribute To Kiss (various artists)	
2006	"CUTWOODeD"	Sunn O))) – WHITEbox	
2008	"I Won't Come Back Alive (Ulver Remix)"	Genghis Tron - Board Up the House Remixes Volume 3	
2008	"Pay For It (Rmx By Ulver)"	Mindless Self Indulgence - Pay For It	
2008	"Thieves In The Temple" (feat. Siri Stranger)	Shockadelica: 50th Anniversary Tribute To The Artist Known As Prince (various artists)	
2008	"Love Love, Kiss Kiss"	Alkaline Trio - Agony & Irony	
2009	"Another Brick In The Wall (Part 1)"	The Wall Re-Built! (various artists)	
2010	"Into The Silent Waves (Ulver Remix)"	Pyramids with Nadja - Into The Silent Waves (single)	
2010	"Synen"	Whom the Moon a Nightsong Sings (various artists)	
2011	"The Visitor (Ulver Via Halstensgård Remix)"	Miracle - The Visitors EP	
2015	"Trist At Det Skulle Ende Slik"	Various - Sannhet På Boks - En Hyllest Til Raga Rockers	
