= Trolsk Sortmetall 1993–1997 =

Box set by Ulver
- Released: November 2014
- Recorded: 1993–1997
- Genre: Black metal, folk metal, folk music
- Length: 2:50 (5CD; 4LP+CS)
- Label: Century Media
- Producer: Ulver, Kristian Romsøe, Håvard "Haavard" Jørgensen, Kristoffer Rygg,

Ulver chronology
| Terrestrials (2014) | Trolsk Sortmetall 1993–1997 (2014) |

Trolsk Sortmetall 1993–1997 is a retrospective box set of albums by Norwegian black metal band Ulver, issued in 2014 via Century Media. Limited to 5000 copies, the set collects Ulver's first demo Vargnatt, together with their first three full-length albums, Bergtatt, Kveldssanger and Nattens madrigal (remastered) with a bonus 4-track rehearsal of songs from Nattens madrigal, recorded in the summer of 1995.

Released in a 5xCD and 4xLP + Cassette format, housed in a cardboard box, with a 104-page booklet consisting of unpublished photos and paraphernalia, original Norwegian lyrics, presentations and their English translations, comments by the band as well as liner notes by Jon 'Metalion' Kristiansen (founder of Head Not Found Records and the man behind Slayer Mag), Chris Bruni (Profound Lore Records), Michael Jenkins Moynihan (author of Lords of Chaos) and Mark Pilkington (Strange Attractor Press). The set commemorates Ulver's black metal phase, before shifting styles dramatically into more ambient, electronic, and experimental music.

Ulver's formative years, collectively known as The Trilogie – Three Journeyes Through the Norwegian Netherworlde, was released under this title as a 1000 limited edition triple picture vinyl box set in 1997.

== Critical reception ==
Professional ratings
Review scores
| Source | Rating |
|---|---|
| Louder Than War | favourable link |
| Record Collector | link |
| This Is Not A Scene | link |
| Magazyn Gitarzysta | link |
| PlanetMosh | link |
| Metal Invader | link |

Upon its release, Trolsk Sortmetall 1993–1997 received positive reviews from music critics.

Louder Than War favoured the collection, calling it a “brilliantly progressive trilogy.” Record Collector noted, “Ulver's beginnings embraced both this burgeoning movement and the native folk and folklore influences collectively surfacing within the country at the time,” before concluding the set “essential for longtime fans and well worthy of investigation for newcomers.”

Independent music review website, This is Not A Scene, concluded “those who have never tried the music of Ulver before – or are more familiar with the contemporary sound of modern day Ulver – will find a treasury of black and folk metal ideas, created at a time when the genre was really finding its voice and direction, by a young band hungry for exploration, experimentation and a sense of continual development.” Web magazine, Metal Invader, said, “Ulver's known trilogy is by now a fundamental chapter in the book of Norwegian black metal. Not only did they influence the modern dark folk scene heavily with their second album, but also did they shake the waters of the scene with their first and third, each one containing some of the best moments of northern extreme music.”

The album art of this retrospective is coming from a drawing of the norwegian illustrator Theodor Kittelsen titled Skogtroll (literally Forest Troll) and dated from 1906.

Polish magazine Magazyn Gitarzysta rated the collection 10/10.

== Track listing ==
=== Vargnatt (CD1, LP1) ===
| No. | Title | Lyrics | Music | Length |
|---|---|---|---|---|
| 1. | "Her Begynner Mine Arr" | J.H. Sværen | C. Michael | 3:22 |
| 2. | "Tragediens Trone" | J.H. Sværen | Ulver | 4:13 |
| 3. | "Trollskogen" | Kris R. | H. Jørgensen | 4:37 |
| 4. | "Ulverytternes Kamp" | Kris R. | Ulver | 5:42 |
| 5. | "Nattens Madrigal" | Kris R. | Ilver | 6:40 |
| 6. | "Vargnatt" | J.H. Sværen | C. Michael | 4:23 |
| Total length: | | | | 29:00 |

=== Bergtatt – Et Eeventyr i 5 Capitler (CD2, LP2) ===
All tracks are written by Ulver.

| No. | Title | Length |
|---|---|---|
| 1. | "Capitel I: I Troldskog faren vild" | 7:51 |
| 2. | "Capitel II: Soelen gaaer bag Aase need" | 6:34 |
| 3. | "Capitel III: Graablick blev hun vaer" | 7:45 |
| 4. | "Capitel IV: Een Stemme locker" | 4:01 |
| 5. | "Capitel V: Bergtatt - Ind i Fjeldkamrene" | 8:06 |
| Total length: | | 34:17 |

=== Kveldssanger (CD3, LP3) ===
| No. | Title | Length |
|---|---|---|
| 1. | "Østenfor Sol og vestenfor Maane" | 3:26 |
| 2. | "Ord" | 0:17 |
| 3. | "Høyfjeldsbilde" | 2:15 |
| 4. | "Nattleite" | 2:12 |
| 5. | "Kveldssang" | 1:32 |
| 6. | "Naturmystikk" | 2:56 |
| 7. | "A cappella (Sielens Sang)" | 1:26 |
| 8. | "Hiertets Vee" | 3:55 |
| 9. | "Kledt i Nattens Farger" | 2:51 |
| 10. | "Halling" | 2:08 |
| 11. | "Utreise" | 2:57 |
| 12. | "Søfn-ør paa Alfers Lund" | 2:38 |
| 13. | "Ulvsblakk" | 6:56 |
| 14. | "Synen (Bonus Track)" | 5:08 |
| Total length: | | 35:29 |

=== Nattens madrigal – Aatte hymne til ulven i manden (CD4, LP4) ===
| No. | Title | Length |
|---|---|---|
| 1. | "I" | 6:16 |
| 2. | "II" | 6:21 |
| 3. | "III" | 4:48 |
| 4. | "IV" | 5:21 |
| 5. | "V" | 5:14 |
| 6. | "VI" | 5:48 |
| 7. | "VII" | 5:32 |
| 8. | "VIII" | 4:38 |
| Total length: | | 43:58 |

=== Nattens madrigal – 4 Track Rehearsal, Summer 1995 (CD5, CS1) ===
| No. | Title | Length |
|---|---|---|
| 1. | "I" | 5:59 |
| 2. | "III" | 4:53 |
| 3. | "V" | 4:57 |
| 4. | "VI" | 6:14 |
| Total length: | | 23:00 |

== Personnel ==
Performers

- Bass Guitar – Mean Malmberg (CD1)
- Cello – Hr. Alf Gaaskjønli (CD3)
- Drums, Percussion – Czral (CD1)
- Flute, Voice – Frk. Lill Kathrine Stensrud (CD2)
- Guitar – Reza (CD1)
- Drums – Erik "AiwarikiaR" Lancelot (CD2-4)
- Bass - Hugh "Skoll" Mingay (CD2, CD4)
- Guitar, Keyboards - Håvard "Haavard" Jørgensen (CD1-4)
- Vocals - Kristoffer "Garm" Rygg (CD1-CD4)
- Guitar, Keyboards - Torbjørn "Aismal" Pedersen (CD2, CD4)
- Piano – Hr. Sverd (CD2)
- Rhythm Guitar – Grellmund (CD1)

Additional Credits

- Arranged By – Garm (CD1), Ulver (CD4)
- Artwork – Kjetil "Frost" Haraldstad
- Composed By – Garm (CD3, CD4), Håvard "Haavard" Jørgensen (CD3-4), Ulver (CD2)
- Engineer – Huldra (CD1), Hr. Anders G. Offenberg Jr. (CD4), Hr. Audun Johan Strype (CD4), Hr. Helge Sten (CD4)
- Engineer, Co-producer, Mixed By – Hr. Kristian Romsøe (CD2-3)
- Layout, Design – Valour
- Liner Notes – Chris Bruni, Jon "Metalion" Kristiansen, Mark Pilkington, Michael Jenkins Moynihan, Ulver
- Lyrics By – Garm (CD2, CD4)
- Mastered By – Hr. Craig Morris (CD2, CD3)
- Painting – Frk. Maria Jaquete, Frk. Tania "Nacht" Stene
- Photography By – Frk. Helene Broch, Morten Andersen, Frk. Tania "Nacht" Stene, Hr. Torgrim Røvreit
- Producer – Ulver (CD1)
- Remastered By – Jaime Gomez Arellano (CD1-3, CD5), Tom Kvålsvoll (CD4)
- Translated Into English By – Mr. Jørn H. Sværen
- Translated Into Archaic Danish By – Erik "AiwarikiaR" Lancelot (CD2, CD4)
- Translated Into Archaic English By – Kai Frost
