= Disguised Masters =

Remix album by Arcturus
- Released: 5 July 1999
- Genre: Avant-garde metal
- Length: 48:09
- Label: Jester Records

Arcturus chronology
La Masquerade Infernale (1997)	Disguised Masters (1999)	The Sham Mirrors (2002)

Professional ratings
Review scores
Source	Rating
AllMusic	2.5/5 stars

Disguised Masters is a remix album by the Norwegian avant-garde metal band Arcturus. The album has two new songs: "White Tie Black Noise" and "Deception Genesis". Other tracks are re-mixed versions of songs from La Masquerade Infernale and "Du Nordavind" from Aspera Hiems Symfonia. Some songs received particularly significant overhauls, such as the gangsta rap version of "Master of Disguise". Due to the significant changes to several of the band's songs, it is not a typical compilation album, and is therefore more suited to existing fans of the band than new listeners.

== Track listing ==
No.	Title	Length
1.	"White Tie Black Noise" (Designed by When)	0:49
2.	"Deception Genesis"	6:35
3.	"Du Nordavind" (1998 re-recording)	3:54
4.	"Alone" (Intellecto and Valle Darktrip Remix)	5:20
5.	"The Throne of Tragedy" (Phantom FX Jungle Remix)	6:49
6.	"La Masquerade Infernale" (Valle and Hellhammer Reconstruction)	2:23
7.	"Master of Disguise" (Phantom FX Remix with Gangstafications by S.C.N.)	4:25
8.	"Painting My Horror" (G. Wolf Levitation Mix)	5:37
9.	"Ad Astra" (The Magenta Experience)	4:39
10.	"Ad Astra" (Ensemble Version)	7:32

== Personnel ==
Arcturus

- Kristoffer Rygg (credited as "G. Wolf") – vocals
- Knut Magne Valle – guitars
- Hugh Mingay (credited as "Skoll") – bass
- Steinar Sverd Johnsen (credited as "Sverd") – keyboards
- Jan Axel Blomberg (credited as "Hellhammer") – drums
