= Håvard Jørgensen =

- Also known as: Haavard; Lemarchand
- Born: 26 September 1975 (age 50); Oslo, Norway
- Genres: Black metal
- Occupations: Musician, composer
- Instruments: Guitars, vocals
- Years active: 1992–present

Håvard Jørgensen (born 26 September 1975), also known as Haavard, Lemarchand, is a songwriter, guitarist and vocalist. He was the original guitarist of the Norwegian black metal bands Satyricon and Ulver.

== Career ==
=== Satyricon ===
One of the initiators of the band Eczema (which later on became Satyricon) which started up in 1991. Eczema won (as the first death metal-act) the Oslo Championship of Rock in 1992 – and changed thereafter the name to Satyricon. Jørgensen participated on the first demo The Forest Is My Throne, but quit the band to join the newly founded Ulver in 1993.

=== Ulver ===
Jørgensen was with Ulver from 1993 to 2000, and later as a session-guitarist.

=== Snøhvitt ===
Vocalist, guitarist and songwriter in Snøhvitt

== Discography ==
=== Satyricon ===
- Satyricon (demo, 1992)

=== Ulver ===
- Rehearsal 1993 (demo, 1993)
- Vargnatt (demo, 1993) – acoustic guitar
- Bergtatt – Et Eeventyr i 5 Capitler (1994) – guitar
- Kveldssanger (1995) – acoustic guitar, producer
- Nattens Madrigal – Aatte Hymne Til Ulven I Manden (1996) – guitar
- The Trilogie – Three Journeyes Through the Norwegian Netherworlde (box set, 1997) – guitar
- Themes from William Blake's The Marriage of Heaven and Hell (1998) – electric guitar
- Metamorphosis (EP, 1999) – electronic programming
- Perdition City (2000) – electric guitar
- Blood Inside (2005) – guitar on Dressed in Black, For the Love of God and Your Call
- Gods of Thunder: A Norwegian Tribute to Kiss (compilation, 2005) – Strange Ways
- Trolsk Sortmetall 1993-1997 (box set, 2014) – guitar, keyboards
- Sannhet på boks – En hyllest til Raga Rockers by various artists (compilation, 2015) – Trist at Det Skulle Ende Slik
- The Assassination of Julius Caesar (2017) – guitar on 1969

=== The Mindtrip Project ===
- Fragmentation (EP, 2000) – Departure and Content Zero

=== SCN ===
- Inside Out (2001) – guitar on All Tied Up and So Free

=== Head Control System ===
- Murder Nature (2006) – lead guitar on Masterpiece (of Art) and Rapid Eye Movement

== Sources ==
- Ulvers medlemmer
