= Knut Magne Valle =

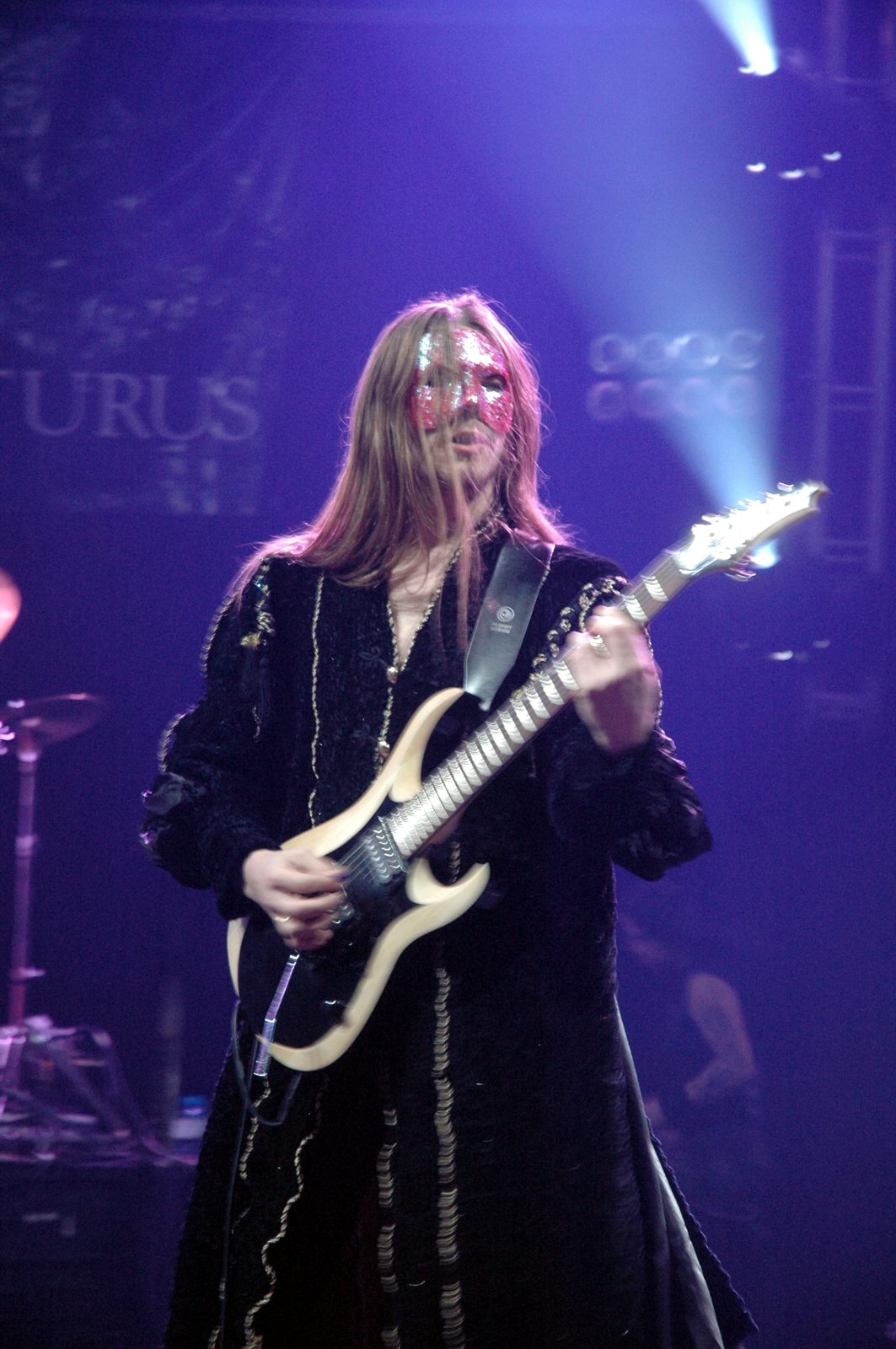
- Knut Magne Valle with Arcturus at the Metalmania Festival 2005.

Background information
- Also known as: Phantom FX, Møllarn
- Born: Knut Magne Valle; 5 August 1974 (age 52)
- Origin: Gjerstad Municipality, Norway
- Genres: Gothic metal, symphonic black metal, avant-garde metal
- Occupations: Guitarist, songwriter, record producer
- Years active: 1994–present
- Labels: Glacier Records, Century Media, Music for Nations, Candlelight, The End, Jester, Season of Mist
- Member of: Arcturus
- Formerly of: Ulver

Knut Magne Valle (born 5 August 1974 in Gjerstad) is a Norwegian heavy metal guitarist, songwriter, composer, recording studio owner, record producer and music arranger. Valle is best known as an Arcturus and Ulver (1998) band member, And since 2024 is touring with The Kovenant.

== Musical career ==
Valle lives in Gjerstad Municipality in Agder county. In 1990 he started Gjerstad Rock club. He went on to the Vefsn Folkehøyskole studying music with specialization in sound engineering in 1992. In 1996/1997 he studied at the Music Instrument Academy (MIA) in Moss. He has been a music teacher in Sunde Junior for 3 years, and is now guitar teacher at the Guitar Academy.

He runs Prestfoss Crusher sound and music studio, and organizes an annual festival Molla. He has produced music for over 50 different bands, at home and abroad. He also makes his own guitars. He previously ran Jester Records recording studio in Oslo, with bands as Mayhem, Arcturus and Ulver as customer list.

In 2011, Valle was awarded with Gjerstad Municipality Culture Award for its longstanding efforts with Mill Festival and volunteering for musical and youth in the municipality. The mayor of Gjerstad stated among other things by awarding:

What primarily interests year's recipient of the Culture Prize is music genre. We are talking about an established and accomplished musician and composer. He also arranges music. The festival is entirely based on volunteer work and volunteer efforts - both from the organizers, helpers and musicians ....... festival has quickly become widely known and put Gjerstad map in music circles worldwide ...... The studio is in today the highest established. Musicians from around the world come here and have used his expertise and his studio to record discs. It's recorded over 200 productions in the studio. World-renowned bands and Fiddler Award winners have been in the studio and recorded their albums.

Agderposten.no 5. November 2011

== Personal life ==
Valle is married and has three children.

== Discography ==
=== With Arcturus ===
- La Masquerade Infernale (1997)
- The Sham Mirrors (2002)
- Sideshow Symphonies (2005)
- Shipwrecked in Oslo DVD (2006)
- Arcturian (2015)

=== With Ulver ===
- Themes from William Blake's The Marriage of Heaven and Hell (1998)

=== As producer / guest musician ===
- Fleurety - Department of Apocalyptic Affairs (2000)
- Ancestral Legacy – Trapped Within the Words (2008)
- Ancestral Legacy - Nightmare Diaries (2010)
- Aura Noir - Deep Tracts of Hell (1998)
- Ragnarok - Diabolical Age (2000)
- Aura Noir - Deep Dreams Of Hell (Compilation, 2005)
- Mayhem - Ordo Ad Chao (2007)
- Ravencult - Temples Of Torment (2007)
