= Shipwrecked in Oslo =

Video by Arcturus
- Released: 2006
- Recorded: 24 September 2005
- Genres: Avant-garde metal, progressive metal, symphonic black metal
- Label: Season of Mist

Arcturus chronology
Sideshow Symphonies (2005)	Shipwrecked in Oslo (2006)	Arcturian (2015)

Professional ratings
Review scores
Source	Rating
Metal Temple	8/10

Shipwrecked in Oslo is the first DVD release by Norwegian avant-garde metal band Arcturus. It was released on 21 August 2006 by Season of Mist. The DVD includes footage of the band's 15 song performance at the Rockefeller Music Hall during the Sonic Solstice Festival in Oslo on 24 September 2005. Extra material such as a photo slideshow and rehearsal footage is also included.

== Track listing ==
1. "At Satans Ship (Introduction)"
2. "Ad Absurdum"
3. "Nightmare Heaven"
4. "Shipwrecked Frontier Pioneer"
5. "Alone"
6. "Deception Genesis"
7. "The Chaos Path"
8. "Tore's Guitar Solo"
9. "Deamon Painter"
10. "Nocturnal Vision Revisited"
11. "Painting My Horror"
12. "Steinar's Keyboard Solo"
13. "Hufsa"
14. "Master of Disguise"
15. "Knut's Guitar Solo"
16. "White Noise Monster"
17. "Reflections"
18. "Raudt Og Svart"
- Tracks 5, 7, 11, 14 were originally released on the album La Masquerade Infernale (1997)
- Track 6 was originally released on the album Disguised Masters (1999)
- Tracks 2, 3 were originally released on the album The Sham Mirrors (2002)
- Tracks 4, 9, 10, 13, 16, 17 were originally released on the album Sideshow Symphonies (2005)
- Track 18 was originally released on the album Aspera Hiems Symfonia (1995)
