= Nightmare Diaries =

Studio album by Ancestral Legacy
- Released: March 1, 2010
- Recorded: Mølla Studio, Gjerstad, Norway, 2007
- Genres: Symphonic black metal, gothic metal
- Length: 56:08
- Label: Femme Metal Records

Ancestral Legacy chronology
Trapped Within the Words (2008)	Nightmare Diaries (2010)	Terminal (2014)

Nightmare Diaries is the second full-length album by Norwegian band Ancestral Legacy, released under the British independent record label Femme Metal Records on March 1, 2010, after signing a contract in December 2008.

== Background ==
Nightmare Diaries was recorded in late 2007 and masterized in mid-2008 by guitarist Knut Magne Valle (Arcturus, Ulver, Fleurety) at Mølla Studio in Gjerstad Municipality. However, it wasn't published until almost a year and a half later, due to production delays.

It is the last album recorded with singer Elin Anita Omholt, who left the band in the late 2008.

== Releases ==
The album was released in two versions: CD and Promo. Promo version includes a plastic sleeve with a two sided paper insert, front cover image with "PROMO COPY" in white letters, back side band picture, a short biography and album info.

== Track listing ==
No.	Title	Length
1.	"Out Of The Dark And Into The Night"	6:11
2.	"Separate Worlds"	5:43
3.	"Chosen Destiny"	5:25
4.	"Perhaps In Death"	7:25
5.	"Trapped Within The Wind"	2:49
6.	"Done"	5:30
7.	"Still"	6:33
8.	"Tomorrow's Chance"	4:50
9.	"...My Departed"	5:21
10.	"The Shadow Of The Cross"	6:21
Total length:		56:08

== Personnel ==
=== Ancestral Legacy ===
- Elin Anita Omholt - Vocals (female)
- Eddie Risdal - Guitars, Vocals (harsh)
- Tor Larsen – Guitar
- Anton Dead – Bass
- Christopher Midtsvéen Vigre - Drums

=== Guest/session musicians ===
- Knut Magne Valle - Guitar solo on "Out Of The Dark And Into The Night", effects
- Silje - Child's cry on "Still"
- Jason Deaville - Spoken parts on "...My Departed"

=== Production and engineering ===
- Produced by Ancestral Legacy
- Remixed & remastered by Knut Magne Valle
