= My Angel (EP) =

EP by Arcturus
- Released: 8 July 1991
- Genre: Death/doom, symphonic black metal
- Length: 12:22
- Label: Putrefaction
- Producer: Arcturus

Arcturus chronology
My Angel (1991)	Constellation (1993)

My Angel is an EP and the debut release by Norwegian metal band Arcturus. It was released on 7" vinyl on 8 July 1991, through the record label Putrifaction Records. The EP is notable for being one of the earliest releases to be labelled symphonic black metal.

== Background and musical style ==
Arcturus's first work published on an actual record label, My Angel represents a halfway point between band leader Steinar Sverd Johnsen's original project Mortem, a death metal band, and the symphonic black metal sound of Constellation and Aspera Hiems Symfonia. Although elements of the latter genre are evident throughout the EP, the overall style is gloomy, down-tempo death-doom metal with low, growled vocals by Mortem's vocalist Marius Vold. Although the songs are simplistic compared to Arcturus' later works, traces of what would become the band's signature style are evident.

My Angel was released with three different cover colors: green, yellow and blue. It is unknown how much of each were printed, but 1100 copies of the EP were printed in total.

Along with four other Norwegian bands this EP was later repackaged as the True Kings of Norway compilation in 2000 by Spikefarm Records

== Reception ==
Joel McIver, author of Extreme Metal II, described the album as "a dark work focusing less on traditional black metal fury than on the ambient bombastics of the synths."

== Track listing ==
No.	Title	Length
1.	"My Angel"	5:57
2.	"Morax"	6:29

== Personnel ==
Arcturus

- Marius Vold – vocals, bass
- Steinar Sverd Johnsen – guitar, keyboards
- Jan Axel Blomberg (credited as "Hellhammer") – drums, percussion
