= Vargnatt =

Demo album by Ulver
- Released: 5 November 1993
- Recorded: 15–17 October 1993
- Genre: Black metal, folk metal, folk music
- Length: 29:00 (CS)
- Label: Independent
- Producer: Ulver

Ulver chronology
Vargnatt (1993)	Bergtatt – Et eeventyr i 5 capitler (1995)

Vargnatt is the debut demo tape by Norwegian black metal band Ulver, issued in 1993 independently. The cassette was limited to 200 hand-numbered copies. The demo was self-produced by Ulver, and recorded in the Norwegian trollforest between 15 and 17 October 1993. This is the only release (besides a rehearsal tape) to feature guitarists Reza and Grellmund (the latter of which committed suicide in 1996), and drummer Czral, as they had left after the new year.

Their music and style was consistent with the early Norwegian black metal subculture during the early 1990s. However some have noted the avant-garde, jazz, rock and gothic influences that would later shape the band's sound. The archaic Dano-Norwegian lyrics were greatly influenced by Scandinavian folktales and inspired by Baroque poets such as Ludvig Holberg and the hymn-writer Thomas Kingo. The cover art contains a 19th-century engraving of a werewolf from the Mansell Collection in London.

According to Avantgarde Metal, "Vargnatt is the primeval quintessence of Ulver's Trilogie; the satanic energy, haunting yet calm beauty and romantic melancholy of the mighty Norwegian Forests, and those who dwell there in. An inspiring soundtrack for a solemn and hateful stroll through the woods at dusk".

In 2003 the demo was significantly remastered, and reissued through Infinite Vinyl in 10-inch white vinyl format, limited to 1,000 hand-numbered copies. The release included additional photos and artwork as well as sleeve notes from Chris Bruni.

The demo was later included in Ulver's Trolsk Sortmetall 1993-1997, a retrospective box set issued in 2014 via Century Media. Limited to 5,000 copies, the set collects Vargnatt together with their first three full-length albums, Bergtatt, Kveldssanger and Nattens madrigal, with a bonus four-track rehearsal of songs from Nattens madrigal recorded in summer 1995.

== Critical reception ==
Professional ratings
Review scores
Source	Rating
AvantgardeMetal	favourable

Vargnatt generally received critical reviews, especially focusing on the low-quality recording.

Webzine Lunar Hypnosis noted: "Even re-mastered Vargnatt is quite raw and it's one of those recordings that really just forces you to turn the volume up loudly so you don't miss anything, and that's just one of the things that makes it so interesting, because so much is happening in these songs. I wouldn't go so far as to call it essential listening, because it's very irregular artistry, but it surely is interesting hearing what is most likely the first black metal recording to feature an underlining folk presence."

Metal Soundscapes added: "It has a great variety in its music styles. Raw black metal, acoustic songs in the vein of Kveldssanger, avant-garde parts, jazz, rock and gothic influences, are all put together in a very primitive and direct approach. Of course, compared to their future releases, this album is of much lower quality, but it's the first sign of what's to come. Full of inspiration, original ideas, and an admiring will to experiment!"

== Track listing ==
No.	Title	Lyrics	Music	Length
1.	"Her Begynner Mine Arr"	J.H. Sværen	C. Michael	3:22
2.	"Tragediens Trone"	J.H. Sværen	Ulver	4:13
3.	"Trollskogen"	Instrumental	H. Jørgensen	4:37
4.	"Ulverytternes Kamp"	Kris R.	Ulver	5:42
5.	"Nattens Madrigal"	Kris R.	Ulver	6:40
6.	"Vargnatt"	J.H. Sværen	C. Michael	4:23
Total length:				29:00

== Personnel ==
Ulver

- Kris R. – vocals
- H. Jørgensen – acoustic guitar
- A. Reza – lead guitar
- Grellmund – rhythm guitar
- Robin – bass guitar
- C. Michael – drums, percussion

Production

- Ulver – production
- Huldra – engineer
- Kris R. – album cover design
