= Terminal (Ancestral Legacy album) =

Studio album by Ancestral Legacy
- Released: September 29th, 2014
- Recorded: 2012
- Genre: Symphonic Black Metal, Doom metal, Gothic Metal
- Length: 1:09:54
- Label: Whispering Voice Records

Ancestral Legacy chronology
Nightmare Diaries (2010)	Terminal (2014)

Terminal is the third full-length album by the Norwegian band Ancestral Legacy, released under Norwegian record label Whispering Voice Records on September 29, 2014.

== Background ==
Terminal is an album with less symphonic black metal elements than its distant predecessor Nightmare Diaries (2010), switching to a greater mix of gothic metal and doom metal, utilizing the usual mixture of light female vocals and harsh male vocals.

It's the first album with Mexican singer Isadora Cortina (guest musician in Trapped Within the Words), who joined the band after the longtime vocalist Elin Anita Omholt had an injury in a car accident in 2008.

== Releases ==
30 CDs were released in slim jewel cases, 6 each with the colours red, orange, green, blue and purple, with a 4-page booklet.

== Track listing ==
No.	Title	Length
1.	"Bone Code"	5:36
2.	"Lethe (Part 1)"	5:23
3.	"There Is No Birth And Death"	4:39
4.	"My Wretched Lord"	6:53
5.	"Lethe (Part 2)"	7:35
6.	"Dawn Of Time"	5:10
7.	"Lethe (Part 3)"	6:11
8.	"Transient Pale Days"	7:49
9.	"Oregon Trail"	4:44
10.	"Death, Silence Without Pain"	5:27
11.	"Shedding You" (Instrumental)	1:34
12.	"Terminal"	8:53
Total length:		01:09:54

== Personnel ==
=== Ancestral Legacy ===
- Isadora Cortina - Vocals (female)
- Eddie Risdal - Guitars, Vocals (harsh)
- Tor Arvid Larsen - Guitars
- Christopher Midtsvéen Vigre- Drums
- Jarl Ivar Brynhildsvoll - Bass

=== Guest/session musicians ===
- Jone Väänänen - Keyboards, Effects
- Jean-Baptiste Frichet - Bass on track 10
- Øyvind Rosseland - Keyboards on track 3
- Anette Ødegaard, Sune Berthelsen - Choir on tracks 4, 6, 7, 12

=== Production and engineering ===
- Jone Väänänen - Mixing, Mastering
