= Constellation (EP) =

EP by Arcturus
- Released: 14 August 1994
- Genre: Symphonic black metal
- Length: 19:48
- Label: Nocturnal Art Productions
- Producer: Kristoffer Rygg

Arcturus chronology
My Angel (1991)	Constellation (1994)	Aspera Hiems Symfonia (1996)

Constellation is the first EP released by Norwegian avant-garde metal band Arcturus. It was released on CD on 14 August 1994, through the record label Nocturnal Art Productions, limited to 500 copies. The EP is the band's only release with guitarist/bassist Samoth, who was sentenced to 16 months in prison for his role in the arson of Skjold Church in Vindafjord Municipality, and the first with Ulver frontman Kristoffer Rygg on vocals, a position he would hold until his departure in 2002.

== Background ==
Constellation was released three years after Arcturus' debut single My Angel (1991). The recording represents a shift towards a more experimental, symphonic black metal sound, as opposed to the more gloomy death/doom style of My Angel.

== Release history ==
The four tracks were later re-recorded for the band's debut album Aspera Hiems Symfonia (1996). In 1997 Nocturnal Art Productions issued a limited edition 12" vinyl of the Constellation EP, backed with the My Angel single and two new tracks. A bootleg release titled Reconstellation came out in 1999 with four additional tracks. Arcturus released a considerably remastered compilation entitled Aspera Hiems Symfonia/Constellation/My Angel in 2003. Kyrck Productions & Armour issued two limited edition CDs of the 1997 12" together with five previously unreleased rehearsal or pre-production versions of early Arcturus material.

== Track listing ==
1. "Rødt Og Svart" – 6:09
2. "Icebound Streams and Vapours Grey" – 4:42
3. "Når Kulda Tar (Frostnettenes Prolog)" – 4:27
4. "Du Nordavind" – 4:30

== Personnel ==
Arcturus

- Kristoffer Rygg (credited as "Garm") – vocals
- Tomas Thormodsæter Haugen (credited as "Samoth") – electric guitar, bass guitar
- Steinar Sverd Johnsen (credited as "Sverd") – keyboards
- Jan Axel Blomberg (credited as "Hellhammer") – drums, percussion
