= Diabolical Age =

Studio album by Ragnarok
- Released: January 31st, 2000
- Recorded: October 1998 and February 1999 at Endless Studio in Oslo, Norway
- Genre: Black metal
- Length: 54:14
- Label: Head Not Found
- Producers: Tore Moren, Knut Magne Valle and Ragnarok

Ragnarok chronology
Arising Realm (1997)	Diabolical Age (2000)	In Nomine Satanas (2002)

Diabolical Age is the third studio album by Norwegian black metal band Ragnarok, released on January 31, 2000, under Head Not Found record label. It is the final album with vocalist Thyme (Dag Ronny Hansen). Arcturus guitarist Knut Magne Valle was the engineer on the recording sessions.

== Track listing ==
All music and lyrics by Ragnarok, except lyrics for track 3 by Lillith Demona and music for track 8 written and performed by Jørgen Ø. Andersen.

No.	Title	Length
1.	"It's War"	7:16
2.	"Nocturnal Sphere"	8:28
3.	"Diabolical Age"	7:06
4.	"Certain Death"	5:16
5.	"The Heart Of Satan"	5:27
6.	"Devastated Christ"	8:32
7.	"The Key Is Turned For The 7th Time"	6:12
8.	"Postludium"	5:54
Total length:		54:14

== Personnel ==
=== Ragnarok ===
- Thyme: Vocal
- Rym: Guitars
- Jerv: Bass
- Jontho P.: Drums

=== Additional personnel ===
- Jørgen Ø. Andersen - Keyboards (track 8)

=== Production and engineering ===
- Recorded during October 1998 and February 1999 at Endless Studio in Oslo.
- Produced by Tore Moren, Knut Magne Valle and Ragnarok.
- Mastered at Strype Audio by Tom Kvålsvoll and Ragnarok.
