= Arising Realm =

Studio album by Ragnarok
- Released: 1997
- Recorded: 1996–1997, X-Ray Studios
- Genre: Black metal
- Length: 50:12
- Label: Head Not Found
- Producers: Ragnarok, Pål-Espen Johannesen

Ragnarok chronology
Nattferd (1995)	Arising Realm (1997)	Diabolical Age (2000)

Arising Realm is the second studio album by Norwegian black metal band Ragnarok. It was released in 1997 through Head Not Found. Shagrath, most famous as a member of Dimmu Borgir, occasionally appears on this album, playing synthesizers.

== Track listing ==
No.	Title	Writer(s)	Length
1.	"Intro"		2:21
2.	"God is Wasted"	Thyme, Rym	4:18
3.	"Searching for My Dark Desire"	Thyme, Rym	4:49
4.	"En Verden Av Steín" (A World of Stone)	Thyme, Rym	4:00
5.	"Time Before Birth of Light"	Thyme, Rym	5:30
6.	"My Hate is His Spirit"	Thyme, Jerv	3:02
7.	"My Refuge in Darkness"	Thyme, Rym	4:58
8.	"The Reflection From the Star World Above"	Thyme, Rym	4:20
9.	"The Fall of Christianity"	Jerv	2:38
10.	"The Predicted Future"	Thyme, Rym	7:12
11.	"For the World I Am Blinded"	Thyme, Jerv	4:36
12.	Untitled (Outro)		2:06
Total length:			50:12

== Personnel ==
=== Ragnarok ===
- Thyme: Vocal
- Rym: Guitars
- Jerv: Bass
- Jontho P.: Drums

=== Additional Personnel ===
- Shagrath: Keyboards, Synthesizers
