= Of Magic Illusions =

Studio album by Ancestral Legacy
- Released: 1 July 2005
- Recorded: 2003
- Genre: Symphonic Black Metal, Gothic Metal
- Length: 1:11:47
- Label: Magik Art Entertainment

Ancestral Legacy chronology
Crash of Silence (DVD) (2004)	Of Magic Illusions (2005)	Trapped Within the Words (2008)

Of Magic Illusions is the first full-length album by the Norwegian band Ancestral Legacy, released on 1 July 2005 under Magik Art Entertainment. Originally was a self-released demo album from April 2003.

== Background ==
The album includes three bonus tracks taken from the 2002 demo Emptiness, plus an extra track from the Of Magic Illusions recording session: “Enveloped” a cover of the Finnish band Rapture, from the album Songs For The Withering (2002). A music video was made for the track "Crash of Silence".

== Track listing ==
No.	Title	Length
1.	"All Things Must End" (Instrumental)	02:06
2.	"Self-Enslavement"	08:14
3.	"Of Magic Illusions"	06:38
4.	"When Sense Dies"	05:57
5.	"Separate Worlds"	06:51
6.	"Crash of Silence"	06:33
7.	"Forsaken"	07:14
8.	"The Silent Season"	06:57
9.	"Enveloped (Rapture cover)*"	04:58
10.	"Whispering Voices*"	04:33
11.	"Ringer of Death*"	05:29
12.	"Cross the Sea*"	06:17
Total length:		01:11:47

(*)Tracks 9 - 12 appears only on the 2005 Re-release on Magik Art. "Cross The Sea" is an edit version of the original track.

== Personnel ==
=== Ancestral Legacy ===
- Elin Anita Omholt - Female Vocals
- Eddie Risdal - Harsh Vocals/Guitars
- Tor Arvid Larsen - Guitars
- Anton Dead a.k.a. Atle Johansen - Bass
- Børre Iversen - Drums

=== Production and Engineering ===
- Eddie Risdal - Mixing, Songwriting, Photography
- Cato Pedersen - Photography, Cover art
