= In Nomine Satanas =

Studio album by Ragnarok
- Released: January 21, 2002
- Recorded: 2001
- Genre: Black metal
- Length: 48:06
- Label: Regain Records

Ragnarok chronology
Diabolical Age (2000)	In Nomine Satanas (2002)	Blackdoor Miracle (2004)

In Nomine Satanas is the fourth album by Norwegian black metal band Ragnarok, released on January 21, 2002.

== Track listing ==
All music written by Ragnarok. All lyrics written by Ragnarok, except "A Nights Kingdom" and "Under The Wings Of Satan", written by Lillith Demona.

No.	Title	Length
1.	"In Nomine Satanas"	5:06
2.	"The Black Mass"	3:59
3.	"A Nights Kingdom"	6:02
4.	"The Beast Of Madness"	4:51
5.	"Under The Wings Of Satan"	4:46
6.	"In Inferno I Drown"	6:23
7.	"Crowned As Prince Of Darkness"	6:21
8.	"Angel Corpse"	5:33
9.	"Encircled By Chaos"	5:11
Total length:		48:06

== Personnel ==
=== Ragnarok ===
- Lord Arcamous - vocals, guitar
- Rym - guitar
- Jerv - bass guitar
- Jontho - drums
