= Hugh Mingay =

Norwegian bassist

Skoll
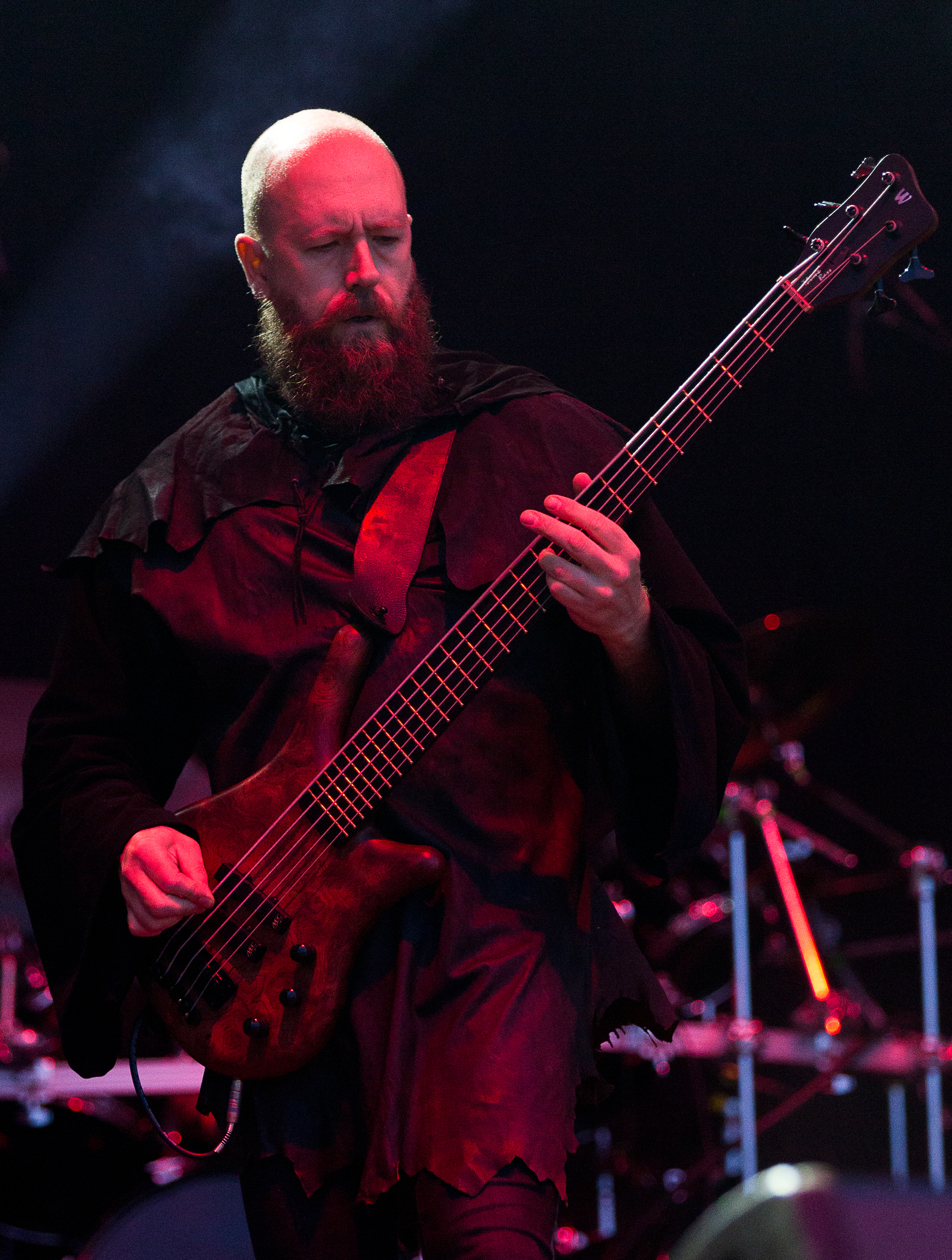
- Skoll with Arcturus in 2016

Background information
- Birth name: Hugh Steven James Mingay
- Born: 12 September 1974 (age 50)
- Origin: Norway
- Genres: Gothic metal, symphonic black metal, avant-garde metal
- Occupation(s): Musician, songwriter
- Instrument: Bass guitar
- Years active: 1994–present
- Member of: Arcturus
- Formerly of: Fimbulwinter, Ulver, Ved Buens Ende

Hugh Steven James Mingay (born 12 December 1974), also known by his stage name Skoll, is a Norwegian bassist.

== Career ==
He became a member of the Norwegian band Arcturus from 1995 to 2000 for the recording of the album Aspera Hiems Symfonia, but he left the band just before The Sham Mirrors was released and was credited as a session member.

Skoll came back to the band in 2002 and remained there until the band broke up in 2007. Hugh has also been the bassist for the Norwegian band Ulver between 1994 and 1998 and was formerly a member of the band Ved Buens Ende, under his pseudonym Skoll.

== Discography ==
=== With Arcturus ===
- Aspera Hiems Symfonia (Studio Album, 1996)
- La Masquerade Infernale (Studio Album, 1997)
- The Sham Mirrors (Studio Album, 2002)
- Aspera Hiems Symfonia/Constellation/My Angel (Compilation, 2002)
- Sideshow Symphonies (Studio Album, 2005)
- Shipwrecked in Oslo (Live Album, 2005)
- Arcturian – (Studio Album, 2015)

=== With Ulver ===
- Bergtatt – Et eeventyr i 5 capitler (Studio Album, 1994)
- Nattens madrigal (Studio Album, 1996)*
- The Trilogie – Three Journeyes Through the Norwegian Netherworlde (Compilation, 1997)
- Themes from William Blake's The Marriage of Heaven and Hell (Studio Album, 1998)

=== With Ved Buens Ende ===
- Written in Waters (Studio Album, 1995)
- Those Who Caress the Pale (EP, 1997)

=== With Fimbulwinter ===
- Servants of Sorcery (Studio Album, 1994)
