= Fimbulwinter (band) =

Norwegian black metal band

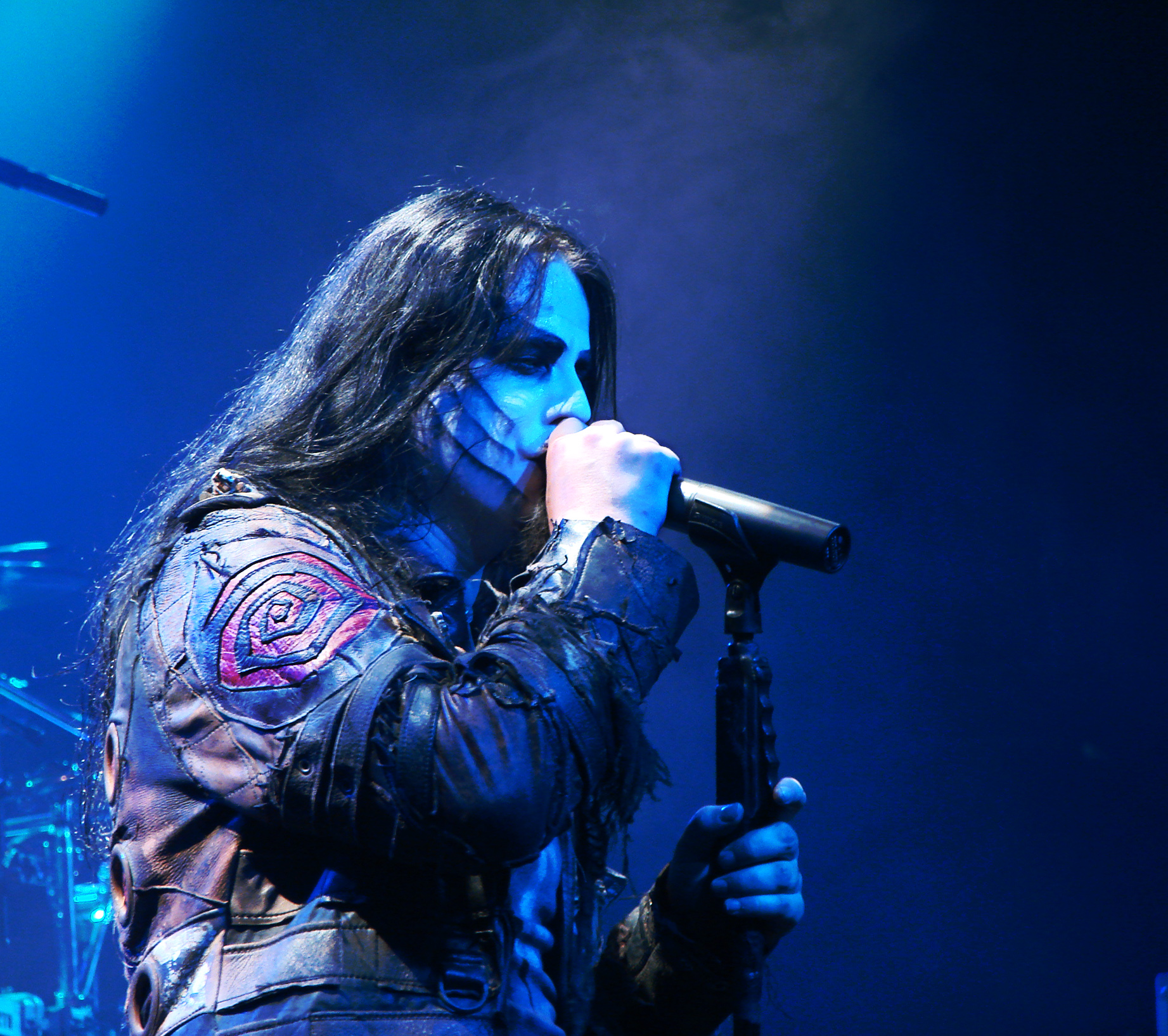
- Guitarist Shagrath

Background information
- Origin: Oslo, Norway
- Genre: Black metal
- Years active: 1992–1994
- Label: Hot Records

Fimbulwinter was a black metal band from the early Norwegian black metal scene. They formed in Oslo during 1992 and released two demos that year. In 1994, they released their only album, Servants of Sorcery, featuring a cover of Celtic Frost's "Morbid Tales", which was the first release by Hot Records.

The band broke up shortly after. Guitarist Shagrath joined Dimmu Borgir and bassist Skoll joined Ulver.

The band is named after Fimbulvetr (or Fimbulvinter), an event in Norse mythology.

== Members ==
- Shagrath (Stian Thoresen) – lead guitar, drums
- Necronos (Morten Lunde) – rhythm guitar, vocals
- Skoll (Hugh Steven James Mingay) – bass
- Orbweaver (Morten Bergseth) – drums

== Discography ==
- 1992 – Rehearsal (demo)
- 1992 – Rehearsal Demo (demo)
- 1994 – Servants of Sorcery (album)
