= Sideshow Symphonies =

Studio album by Arcturus
- Released: 19 September 2005
- Recorded: February–June 2005
- Studio: Mølka Studios
- Genre: Progressive metal, avant-garde metal, symphonic black metal
- Length: 50:31
- Label: Season of Mist
- Producer: Arcturus

Arcturus chronology
| The Sham Mirrors (2002) | Sideshow Symphonies (2005) | Shipwrecked in Oslo (2006) |

Sideshow Symphonies is the fourth studio album by the Norwegian avant-garde metal band Arcturus. It was released on 19 September 2005. It is the first to feature Simen "ICS Vortex" Hestnæs as the principal vocalist and Tore Moren as second guitarist, as well as the first Arcturus album released by Season of Mist. It marks yet another change in Arcturus' sound, with a cold, dreamy aesthetic featuring relatively quiet guitars, more prominent vocals, and a slightly reduced use of synthesizers.

A problem during the mastering process caused some audio quality issues, most notably a substantial decrease in volume on "Shipwrecked Frontier Pioneer". The label was rumored to be working on fixing these issues for future pressings of the CD, but this seems to have never been addressed as the audio glitches are still present.

"Hufsa" is the Norwegian name for The Groke, a fictional character of Tove Jansson's children's book series Moomin.

== Track listing ==
| No. | Title | Length |
|---|---|---|
| 1. | "Hibernation Sickness Complete" | 5:02 |
| 2. | "Shipwrecked Frontier Pioneer" | 8:32 |
| 3. | "Deamonpainter" | 5:33 |
| 4. | "Nocturnal Vision Revisited" | 5:16 |
| 5. | "Evacuation Code Deciphered" | 6:16 |
| 6. | "Moonshine Delirium" | 7:10 |
| 7. | "White Noise Monster" | 3:55 |
| 8. | "Reflections" (instrumental) | 3:40 |
| 9. | "Hufsa" | 5:07 |
| Total length: | | 50:31 |

== Artwork ==
The album artwork features a modification of the artwork found on the Pioneer 10 deep space probe, possibly a reference to the album's second song "Shipwrecked Frontier Pioneer". The original picture of the naked man is mirrored so that he appears to have three legs and a mask is added, while the image of the naked woman does not appear at all. Also shown is the symbolic representation of the probe's trajectory and a schematic representation of the hyperfine transition of hydrogen.

== Personnel ==
Arcturus

- Simen Hestnæs (credited as "ICS Vortex") – vocals
- Knut Magne Valle (credited as "Knut Valle") – guitars
- Tore Moren – guitars, engineering, mastering
- Hugh Mingay – bass
- Steinar Sverd Johnsen (credited as "Steinar Sverd") – keyboards
- Jan Axel Blomberg (credited as "Von Blomberg") – drums

Additional personnel and staff

- Silje Wergeland – vocals on "Shipwrecked Frontier Pioneer" and "Evacuation Code Deciphered"
- Kim Sølve – design, photography
- Trine Paulsen – design, photography
- Morten Lund – mastering
- Børge Finstad – mixing
