= Nattferd =

Studio album by Ragnarok
- Released: November 1995
- Recorded: May 1995 at X-Ray Studios
- Genre: Black metal
- Length: 47:42
- Language: English, Norwegian
- Label: Head Not Found
- Producer: Pål Espen Johannessen & Ragnarok

Ragnarok chronology
Pagan Lands (1995)	Nattferd (1995)	Arising Realm (1997)

Nattferd (in English Night Travel) is the debut album by Norwegian black metal band Ragnarok, released in 1995 under Head Not Found.

== Track listing ==
All the music by Rym. All the lyrics by Thyme, except track 8 by Jerv.

No.	Title	Length
1.	"Intro"	1:53
2.	"Pagan Land"	2:35
3.	"Age of Pride"	7:04
4.	"From the Darkest Deep"	4:24
5.	"Daudens Natt" ("The Night of Death")	6:40
6.	"The Norse Winter Demon"	4:52
7.	"Hammerns Slag" ("The Hammer's Strike")	3:09
8.	"Minner Om Svunne Tider" (Memories of Lost Times)	4:23
9.	"Et Vinterland i Nord" ("A Winterland in the North")	5:33
10.	"Ragnarok"	4:59
11.	"Nattferd (Outro)" ("Nighttravel")	2:11
Total length:		47:42

== Personnel ==
=== Ragnarok ===
- Thyme - vocals
- Rym - guitar
- Jerv - bass guitar
- Jontho - drums

=== Additional personnel ===
- Pål Espen Johannesen - Keyboards

=== Production and engineering ===
- Pål Espen Johannessen - producer and engineer
- Recorded at X-Ray Studios in early 1995.
- Produced by Pål E. Johannessen & Ragnarok.
- Mastered at Strype Audio in Oslo.
