= The Norwegian National Opera =

Concert film by Ulver

Video by Ulver
- Released: 28 November 2011
- Recorded: 31 July 2010
- Genre: Experimental, electronic, ambient
- Length: 88:02
- Label: Jester Records, Kscope
- Director: Erlend Gjertsen

Ulver chronology
Wars of the Roses (2011)	The Norwegian National Opera (2011)	Childhood's End (2012)

The Norwegian National Opera

Live album by Ulver
- Released: 20 April 2013
- Recorded: 31 July 2010
- Genre: Experimental, electronic, ambient
- Length: 79:45
- Label: Jester Records, Kscope

Ulver chronology
Wars of the Roses (2011)	The Norwegian National Opera (2013)	Childhood's End (2012)

The Norwegian National Opera is a concert film by Norwegian Experimental electronica band Ulver. Directed by Erlend Gjertsen, the film was issued on DVD and Blu-ray Disc in November 2011 via Jester Records and Kscope. The film documents Ulver’s performance at The Norwegian National Opera on 31 July 2010. The concert was later issued as a CD/DVD set, and double LP. The film holds an 18 rating from the BBFC for containing strong sex and bloody images, however, no cuts were made to the performance.

The concert also included performances from artist Ian Johnstone, “welcoming everyone as Mr. Ark Todd in a static dance under a levitating moon, and parting with a pillar, on the skeleton legs of a horse, pale and naked as nature intended. The two pieces were accompanied by piano prepared by Daniel and the sound of a sleeping beast from Kris' pad.”

Until recently Ulver had remained exclusively within the studio. This changed in May 2009 when the band accepted an invitation to appear at the Norwegian Festival of Literature. The success of this gig lead to them embarking on a string of other live performances in 2009 and 2010, selling out prestigious venues such as the Queen Elizabeth Hall in London, Volksbühne in Berlin and La Cigale in Paris before they returned to their homeland for their performance at The Norwegian Opera House.

Ulver were the first band outside the established Norwegian music scene to be invited to play at the Opera House.

On 9 September 2011 a trailer was released by Kscope.

== Background ==
During their first fifteen years, Ulver never played live, with the exception of a single show in Oslo in 1993 where they played songs from their demo tape Vargnatt, which contributed to the shaping of their musical legacy. Stig Sæterbakken finally persuading the band to play their first concert at the Norwegian Festival of Literature in May 2009, fans came from all over the world – including Australia, Japan, Canada and the US.

A national newspaper wrote on the band's concert at the Logen Theatre in Bergen, "The cult band hit us hard with suggestive music. Ulver is one of the few bands which can move from pictures of Jesus to sex, burlesque and atom bombs without making you jump. The music alone is too powerful for anything to make you more flabbergasted."

Malcolm Dome, writing for Classic Rock Magazine, commented, "Ulver's presentation is surreal and stark. A psychedelic excursion, an immersive experience, fuelled by haunting, progressive art. After such a night, you don't want to see another band for a few days. Because anything else would pale when put alongside Ulver."

Mojo writer, Phil Alexander, added, "In many respects, Ulver epitomise what happens when metal's melancholic strand is taken to its logical conclusion. While the band's roots lie in clattering black metal, their evolution began with the release of 1998's openly progressive Themes from William Blake's The Marriage of Heaven and Hell. By the time they'd got to Shadows of the Sun, they'd wandered still further away from their gnashing early work, sitting at the remote, windswept crossroads of art-rock, ambient adventurism, improvisational noise, and the hymnal aspects of modern classical music."

== Critical reception ==
Upon release The Norwegian National Opera received positive reviews from music critics.

Mats Johansen, writing for Mind Over Metal, gave the DVD a 5/5 rating, calling it "a magnificent rock extravaganza".

Craig Haze, writing for Hellbound, called the film "mesmerizing and stunning beautiful".

== Track listing ==
No.	Title	Length
1.	"The Moon Piece"	4:52
2.	"Eos"	5:34
3.	"Let the Children Go"	4:47
4.	"Little Blue Bird"	6:11
5.	"Rock Massif"	2:19
6.	"For the Love of God"	4:10
7.	"In the Red"	3:42
8.	"Operator"	4:13
9.	"Funebre"	5:08
10.	"Excerpts of Silence"	3:02
11.	"A Memorable Fancy"	3:15
12.	"Hallways of Always"	6:29
13.	"England"	3:56
14.	"A Cold Kiss"	4:42
15.	"Like Music"	5:19
16.	"Not Saved"	9:00
17.	"The Leg Cutting Piece"	3:06

== Personnel ==
Ulver

- Kristoffer Rygg – lead vocals, programming
- Tore Ylwizaker – keyboards, programming
- Jørn H. Sværen – miscellaneous
- Daniel O'Sullivan – guitar, bass, keyboards, backing vocals

Additional musicians

- Tomas Pettersen – drums, percussion
- Christian Fennesz – guitar, programming
- Ole Alexander Halstensgård – miscellaneous

Other credits

- Performer – Ian Johnstone
- Design – Metastazis, Paris
- Engineer, Live Sound – Chris Fullard
- Film Director, Film Editor – Popcom, Oslo – Erlend Gjertsen
- Lighting – McDeath
- Liner Notes – Stig Sæterbakken, Ulver
- Mastering – Jaime Gomez Arellano
- Mix – Anders Møller, Ulver
- Photography – Lars K. Lande
- Technician, Late Additions & Live Visuals – Kristin Bøyesen
- Technician, Live Monitoring – Bjørn Hinkel
