= Servants of Sorcery =

Studio album by Fimbulwinter
- Released: 1994
- Recorded: October–December 1992
- Genre: Black metal
- Length: 38:12
- Label: Hot Records

Servants of Sorcery is a Norwegian black metal album by Fimbulwinter, released by Hot Records in 1994. The album is actually a remaster of Fimbulwinter's 1992 demo, with an additional song.

== Track listing ==
1. "Intro" – 01:05
2. "When the Fire Leaps From the Ash Mountain" – 06:04
3. "Servants of Sorcery" – 06:53
4. "Black Metal Storm" – 03:12
5. "Morbid Tales" (Celtic Frost cover) – 03:38
6. "Fimbulwinter Sacrifice" – 07:44
7. "Roaring Hellfire" – 07:36

== Personnel ==
- Shagrath – lead guitar
- Necronos – rhythm guitar, vocals
- Skoll – bass
- Per Morten Bergseth – drums
