= Blackdoor Miracle =

Studio album by Ragnarok
- Released: March 26th, 2004
- Recorded: March 2003 at The Abyss Studio in Pärlby, Sweden
- Genre: Black metal
- Length: 42:12
- Label: Regain Records
- Producers: Tommy Tägtgren and Ragnarok

Ragnarok chronology
In Nomine Satanas (2002)	Blackdoor Miracle (2004)	Collectors of the King» (2010)

Blackdoor Miracle is the fifth studio album by Norwegian black metal band Ragnarok, released on January March 26, 2004 under Regain Records.

== Track listing ==
All music by Ragnarok. All lyrics by Espen Dyngen except "Blackdoor Miracle", "Murder", and "Kneel" by Hoest.

No.	Title	Length
1.	"Preludium"	1:54
2.	"Heir Of Darkness"	4:26
3.	"Rites Of Geburah"	4:30
4.	"Blackdoor Miracle"	4:43
5.	"Murder"	5:17
6.	"Kneel"	4:06
7.	"Bless Thee For Granting Me Pain"	4:14
8.	"Journey From Life"	6:45
Total length:		42:12

Bonus track (only US and LP release)
No.	Title	Length
1.	"It's War"	7:16
Total length:		7:16

== Personnel ==
=== Ragnarok ===
- Hoest: Vocal
- Rym: Guitars
- Jerv: Bass
- Jontho P.: Drums

=== Production and engineering ===
- Tommy Tägtgren - Recording, Producer, Engineering
- Goran Finberg - Mastering
- Jacek Wiśniewski - Layout, Artwork
- Recorded in March 2003 at Abyss Studio in Pärlby, Sweden
- Produced by Tommy Tägtgren and Ragnarok.
- Mastered at The Mastering Room, Göteborg, Sweden.
