= Arcturian (album) =

Studio album by Arcturus
- Released: 8 May 2015
- Recorded: 2010–2014
- Genre: Progressive metal, avant-garde metal, symphonic black metal
- Length: 47:47
- Label: Prophecy Productions

Arcturus chronology
Shipwrecked in Oslo (2006)	Arcturian (2015)

Arcturian is the fifth studio album by the Norwegian avant-garde metal band Arcturus. It was released on 8 May 2015 and was the first album by the band in ten years. The album features Simen "ICS Vortex" Hestnæs as the principal vocalist. The first single for the album, "The Arcturian Sign", was released on 27 March 2015.

== Track listing ==
No.	Title	Length
1.	"The Arcturian Sign"	5:08
2.	"Crashland"	4:08
3.	"Angst"	4:26
4.	"Warp"	3:51
5.	"Game Over"	5:57
6.	"Demon"	3:27
7.	"Pale"	5:10
8.	"The Journey"	4:14
9.	"Archer"	5:36
10.	"Bane"	5:50

Special edition bonus tracks
No.	Title	Length
1.	"Angst (Industrial Club Remix By Pride And Fall)"
2.	"Archer (Sun Of The Sleepless Geisterbahn Remix)"
3.	"Game Over (Germ Remix)"
4.	"Warp (Wormhole Remix By Encephalon)"
5.	"Angst (Nailbomb Remix By Fractured)"
6.	"Arcturian Psychedelic Sign (By MøllårN)"
7.	"Warp (Germ Remix)"
8.	"Pale (Necro Deathmort Remix)"

== Personnel ==
=== Arcturus ===
- Simen Hestnæs (credited as "ICS Vortex") – vocals
- Knut Magne Valle (credited as "Møllarn") – guitar, lead vocals on "The Journey"
- Hugh Mingay (credited as "Skoll") – bass
- Steinar Sverd Johnsen (credited as "Sverd") – keyboards
- Jan Axel Blomberg (credited as "Hellhammer") – drums, percussion

=== Additional personnel ===
- Sebastian Grouchot – violin

== Charts ==
Chart (2015)	Peak position
German Albums (Offizielle Top 100)	15
