= Tania Stene =

Norwegian artist

Tania Stene (also Tanya Stene, Tanja Stene, Nacht, Nachthexe) is a Norwegian interdisciplinary artist. She works with different techniques such as oils/acrylics, photography, collage, video, sound and installation. Originally known as half of the ritual ambient duo Aghast (along with Andréa Nebel), her newer music is more experimental and noisy (collaboration with Alexei Borisov on Fabriksampler V2 - Pharmafabrik Recordings). She is known for cover art & photo shoots for some of the biggest Norwegian black metal bands in the '90s, including Darkthrone, Ulver, Thorns, Satyricon, Burzum, Emperor and Sunn O))) live album. Tania Stene used to be married to Fenriz (Darkthrone). She is also known for her cover art of Bergtatt, Nattens Madrigal and Hliðskjálf, and for official photo shoots of Isengard and Thorns.
