= Ragnarok (Norwegian band) =

Norwegian black metal band

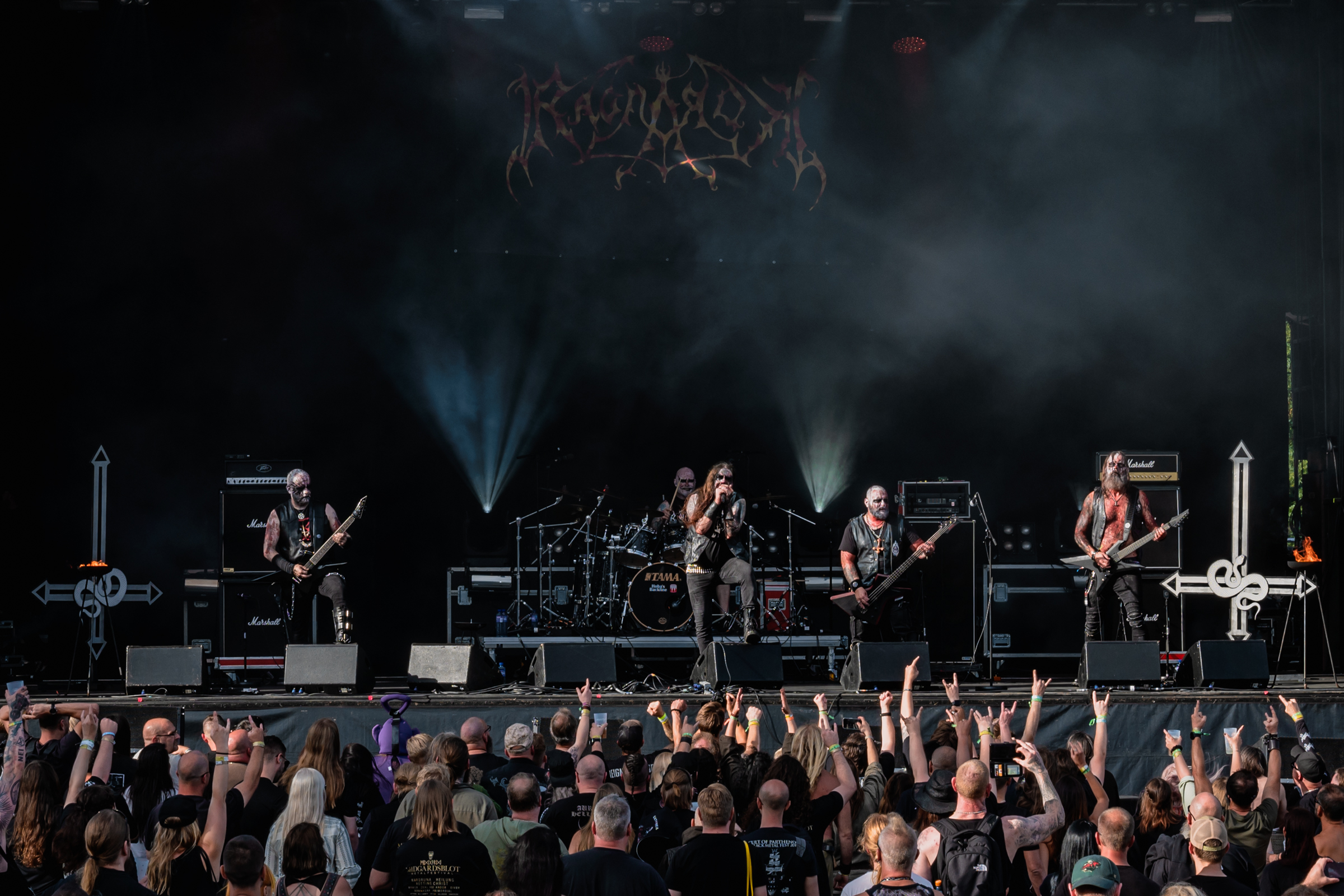
- Ragnarok performing in 2022

Background information
- Origin: Sarpsborg, Norway
- Genre: Black metal
- Years active: 1994–2025
- Past members: Rym; Haave; Hans; Hoest; Jerv; Thyme; Astaroth; Lord Arcamous; Brigge; Decepticon; Bjarkan; Ihizahg; Vargblod; Jontho
- Website: ragnarokhorde.com

Ragnarok were a Norwegian black metal band. It was formed in Sarpsborg in 1994 by Jerv and Jontho after leaving their previous band, Thoth. Lyrics deal with Norse Mythology, Vikings, Satanism, War, and Anti-Christianity. The band's name comes from the Old Norse word Ragnarök, the last battle between the Norse gods and the giants. They are "one of the most extreme black metal bands in Norway", using make-up and special effects.

== History ==
Shortly after forming in 1994, Ragnarok released their first demo, Et Vinterland i Nord. The original lineup consisted of bassist Jerv, drummer Jontho, guitarist Rym, and vocalist Thyme. The demo received good feedback. The band signed to Head Not Found Records, who released Ragnarok's debut album Nattferd in 1995.

The band was dissatisfied with Head Not Found Records. They intended to leave in 1996, but signed a contract for two more albums after the label offered them a better deal. This meant that Ragnarok had to turn Century Media down.

In 1997, Ragnarok began work on second album Arising Realm, featuring Shagrath of Dimmu Borgir on keyboards. In 1998, Ragnarok toured for the first time, playing eight shows in Denmark and Germany and the Blood Log Festival in Leipzig. At the end of the year, Ragnarok started recording third album Diabolical Age, which they finished in 1999. Thyme had left the band, replaced with vocalist Astaroth. Sander joined as a second guitarist until Lord Arcamous replaced him after the release of Diabolical Age in 2000.

Later in 2000, Ragnarok embarked on a short tour with Swedish band Satanic Slaughter. Astaroth left the band after the tour. Lord Arcamous filled in as vocalist on the album In Nomine Satanas on Regain Records. He was replaced with Hoest of Taake in 2002.

After Hoest joined, Ragnarok toured Europe and North America. They recorded Blackdoor Miracle in 2004.

The only remaining original member, drummer Jontho, announced they would tour with a new lineup. The band were scheduled for the 10th anniversary of the Inferno Metal Festival in 2010. When they played there in 2003, a reviewer from HeavyMetal.no said their performance "fitted very well into [my concept of black metal], both good and bad" and seemed to please the crowd. And, in December 2005, they successfully played their "first time at a drug-free event" at St. Croix in Fredrikstad.

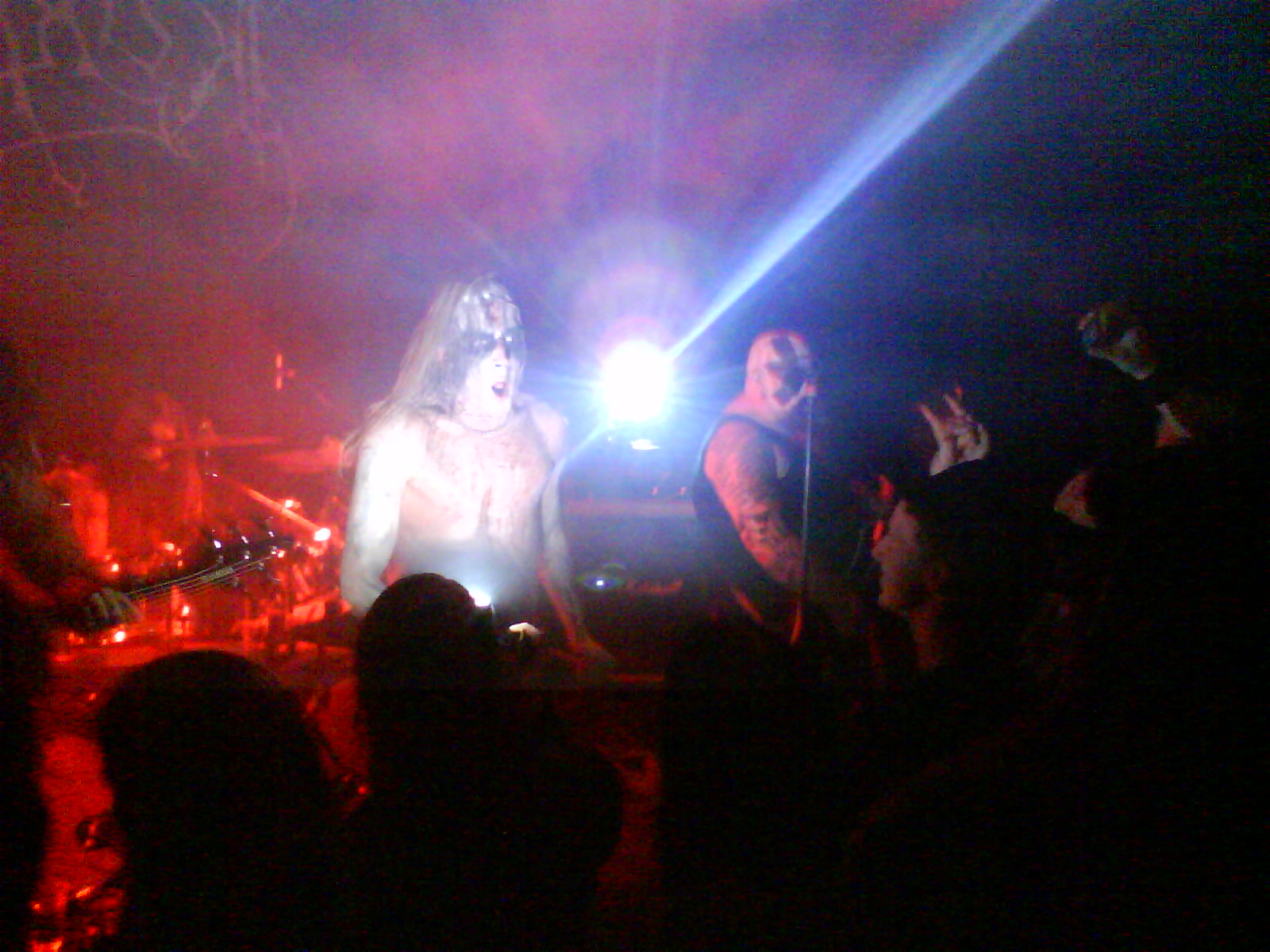
Ragnarok performing live in Sarpsborg in 2010

In March 2010, they released Collectors of the King through Regain Records. A reviewer at HeavyMetal.no called it "some of the most insistent and gripping Black Metal I've heard in a while." The reviewer at NecroWeb gave it 7 out of 10 points.

In May 2012, they signed with Agonia Records and announced a seventh album. They released it on 31 October in Europe and 6 November in North America under the name Malediction.

Vocalist Hans Fryste left the band in early 2014. Drummer and founder Jontho took over vocals and Malignant took over drums.

On 29 April 2017, former bassist and co-founder Jerv died in a car accident.

Ragnarok played the Midgardsblot open air festival in 2022. The lineup included Jontho, Bjarkan (guitar), Ihizahg (guitar), Hellcommander Vargblod (bass), and drummer Anders Haave.

In 2023, three members left due to personal issues, leaving Jontho as the sole remaining member. In 2024, original member and guitarist Rym returned to the line-up.

Jontho died on 21 December 2025, at the age of 48.

== Members ==
- Jontho – drums (1994–2014), vocals (2014–2025; died 2025)
- Thyme – vocals (1994–1999)
- Jerv – bass (1994–2007; died 2017)
- Astaroth – vocals (2000–2001)
- Lord Arcamous – vocals (2001–2002)
- Hoest – vocals (2002–2007)
- Brigge – guitar (2008–2010)
- HansFyrste – vocals (2008–2014)
- Decepticon – bass (2008–2016)
- Bolverk - guitar (2010–2019)
- Rakkestad - bass (2017–2020)
- Malignant - drums (2014–2020)
- Bjarkan – guitar (2020–2023)
- Ihizahg – guitar (2021–2023)
- Hellcommander Vargblod – bass (2021–2023)
- Rym – guitar (1994–2007, 2024–2025)
- Haave – drums live (2022–2023)

== Discography ==
- Et Vinterland i Nord demo (1994)
- North Land demo (1995)
- Nattferd (1995)
- Arising Realm (1997)
- Diabolical Age (2000)
- In Nomine Satanas (2002)
- Blackdoor Miracle (2004)
- Collectors of the King (2010)
- Malediction (2012)
- Psychopathology (2016)
- Non Debellicata (2019)
