= Trapped Within the Words =

Trapped Within the Word

EP by Ancestral Legacy
- Released: April 10th, 2008
- Recorded: Mølla Studio, Gjerstad, Norway, 2007
- Genre: Gothic metal
- Length: 25:01
- Label: Independent

Ancestral Legacy chronology
Of Magic Illusions (2005)	Trapped Within the Word (2008)	Nightmare Diaries (2010)

Trapped Within the Words is an EP by the Norwegian band Ancestral Legacy, released on April 10, 2008.

== Track listing ==
1. "Forsaken" - 7:06
2. "Wordless History" - 6:28
3. "Atrapada En Pesadillas" - 2:50
4. "Disclosed" - 5:26
5. "Glimmer" - 6:45

== Personnel ==
=== Ancestral Legacy ===
- Elin Anita Omholt - Vocals (female)
- Eddie Risdal - Guitars, Vocals (harsh), Synthetizers
- Christopher Midtsvéen Vigre - Drums
- Tor Arvid Larsen - Guitars

=== Guest/session musicians ===
- Isadora Cortina - Vocals (female) (track 3)
- Knut Magne Valle - Effects (additional) (track 2)

=== Production and engineering ===
- Eddie Risdal - Layout, Songwriting
- Knut Magne Valle - Mixing, Mastering
- Cato Pedersen - Photography (band)
- Marcela Bolívar - Cover art
