= The Sham Mirrors =

Studio album by Arcturus
- Released: 22 April 2002
- Recorded: 2000–2002
- Genre: Progressive metal, avant-garde metal, symphonic black metal
- Length: 43:13
- Label: Ad Astra Enterprises

Arcturus chronology
La Masquerade Infernale (1997)	The Sham Mirrors (2002)	Sideshow Symphonies (2005)

Professional ratings
Review scores
Source	Rating
AllMusic	4.5/5 stars
Chronicles of Chaos	9.5/10

The Sham Mirrors is the third studio album by Norwegian avant-garde metal band Arcturus. It was released on 9 April 2002.

The album is a departure from the band's previous albums, featuring a much more modern, space-influenced sound, as opposed to the layered, classical melodies of 1997's La Masquerade Infernale. The album contains elements of trip hop, ambient music and electronica in addition to the band's usual progressive black metal sound. Lyrically, the album deals with abstract science fiction-themed subjects, a stark contrast to the theatrical and Satanic lyrics of the band's earlier work. The album cover depicts a model drawing of the upper part of the Apollo spaceship.

This is the last album to feature Kristoffer Rygg on vocals.

== Track listing ==
All lyrics are written by Kristoffer Rygg, except tracks 4 and 6, written by Jørn H. Sværen; all music is composed by Steinar Sverd Johnsen.

No.	Title	Length
1.	"Kinetic"	5:25
2.	"Nightmare Heaven"	6:05
3.	"Ad Absurdum"	6:48
4.	"Collapse Generation"	4:13
5.	"Star-Crossed"	5:01
6.	"Radical Cut"	5:08
7.	"For to End Yet Again"	10:33
Total length:		43:13

== Personnel ==
Arcturus

- Kristoffer Rygg (credited as "Trickster G. Rex") – vocals, producer, engineer
- Knut M. Valle – guitar, engineer
- Dag F. Gravem – bass
- Steinar Sverd Johnsen – keyboards, engineer
- Jan Axel Blomberg (credited as "Hellhammer") – drums, percussion

Additional Musicians

- Ihsahn – vocals (on "Radical Cut")
- Mathias Eick – trumpet (on "Ad Absurdum", "Collapse Generation" and "Radical Cut")
- Hugh Steven James Mingay – low frequentation (on "Radical Cut")

Production Staff

- Phantom FX – co-producer
- Tore Ylwizaker – mixing
- Tom La Bomba – mastering

== Charts ==
Chart (2002)	Peak position
Finnish Albums (Suomen virallinen lista)	39
