= Ancestral Legacy =

Norwegian metal band

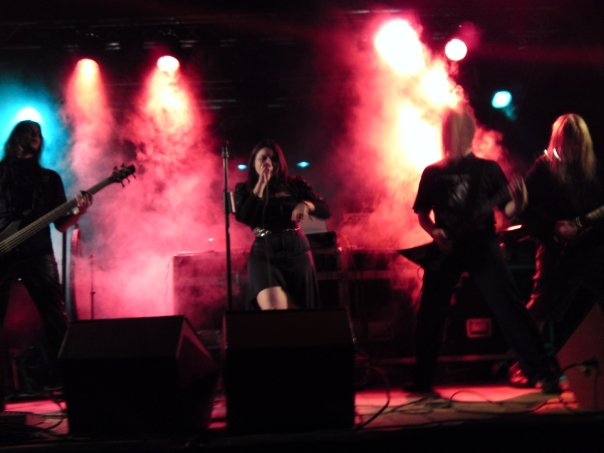

Background information
- Origin: Froland, Norway
- Genres: Gothic metal
- Years active: 1995–present
- Labels: Femme Metal Records; Whispering Voice Records
- Members: Eddie Risdal; Atle Johansen; Isadora Cortina; Tor Arvid Larsen; Christopher Vigre
- Past members: Elin Anita Omholt; Børre Iversen; Kjell-Ivar Aarli; Øyvind Rosseland; Stefan Hammer Knutsen; Thomas Bie
- Website: www.ancestrallegacy.com

Ancestral Legacy is a Norwegian gothic metal-band, started in 1995 as Permafrost.

In 1999 they changed their name to Ancestral Legacy and also changed their musical style from black / death metal to more symphonic metal.

== History ==
The band was founded in December 1995 by Eddie Risdal as Permafrost. At first the music was inspired by extreme metal bands such as Dissection, Unanimated, Darkthrone and Ulver. The band changed its name to Ancestral Legacy in 1999 and was more symphonic.

The band released two demos, a self-titled in 2000 and Emptiness in 2002. Two members joined and Eddie Risdal (singer / guitarist) gathered new members. The demo Of Magic Illusions and promo Goodbye Reality came in respectively 2003 and 2004. The former was in 2005 re-released with four bonus tracks by the Russian label Magik Art. A music video for the song "Crash Of Silence" was shown on NRK2 Metal Svisj video jukebox autumn 2005.

In 2007, 14 songs were recorded for an upcoming album, Nightmare Diaries. The songs were mixed in January 2008 by Knut Magne Valle at his studio. In April, the EP Trapped Within the Words published by the band itself. The album Nightmare Diaries was released in winter 2010 by the British company Femme Metal Records. A double compilation CD released by the American label Siren Ette summer 2008 with Ancestral Legacy's song "Chosen Destiny" from the upcoming album. Other bands on the release include After Forever and Epica.

In September 2014, the band released their third studio album entitled Terminal, with Mexican singer Isadora Cortina.

== Discography ==
Studio albums

- Of Magic Illusions (Magik Art Entertainment, 2005)
- Nightmare Diaries (Femme Metal Records, 2010)
- Terminal (Whispering Voice Records, 2014)

Demos and promos

- Ancestral Legacy (Demo, 2000)
- Emptiness (Demo, 2002)
- Of Magic Illusions (Demo, 2003)
- November (Demo, 2003)
- Goodbye Reality (Promo, 2004)

EPs

- Trapped Within the Words (EP, 2008)
- The Silent Frontier (2019)

DVDs

- Crash of Silence (DVD, 2005)

== Music videos ==
- "Crash Of Silence" (2004)

== Members ==
Current members

- Isadora Cortina – Vocals, keyboards
- Eddie Risdal – Guitar, vocals
- Jon Rune Førland – Guitar
- Jarl Ivar Brynhildsvoll – Bass
- Christopher Vigre – Drums

Former members

- Tor Arvid Larsen – Guitar (2002–2013)
- Atle «Anton Dead» Johansen – Bass (2003–2011)
- Elin Anita Omholt – Vocals (2002–2008)
- Børre Iversen – Drums (2002–2005)
- Kjell-Ivar Aarli – Bass, vocals (1995–2002)
- Øyvind Rosseland – Synthesizer, guitar (1998–2002)
- Stefan Hammer Knutsen – Drums (2000–2001)
- Thomas Bie – Guitar (2001)
