= Kveldssanger =

Studio album by Ulver
- Released: March 1996
- Recorded: 1995
- Studio: Endless Lydstudio, Oslo, Norway
- Genre: Dark folk; neofolk
- Length: 35:29
- Language: Norwegian
- Label: Head Not Found
- Producer: Håvard Jørgensen, Kristian Romsøe, Kristoffer Rygg

Ulver chronology
Bergtatt - Et eeventyr i 5 capitler (1995)	Kveldssanger (1996)	Nattens madrigal (1997)

Kveldssanger (translated as "Twilight Songs") is the second studio album by Norwegian band Ulver, issued in March 1996 via Head Not Found. The album was recorded at Endless Lydstudio, Oslo, Norway in the summer and autumn of 1995, with Kristian Romsøe as engineer and co-producer.

== Background ==
For Kveldssanger, the second part of what has become known as Ulver's "Black Metal Trilogie", the band expanded upon the quiet, folk-influenced acoustic elements present in their debut album, Bergtatt. Incorporating classical guitars, cello and choral chamber chants overlaid with subtle orchestral landscapes - eschewing any black metal elements - the album was a drastic contrast to Bergtatt and other black metal albums of the time, whilst still retaining a level of atmospheric and folklore-themed lyrics. Vocalist Kristoffer Rygg has since remarked that Kveldssanger was an "immature attempt at making a classical album", yet he felt the content was strong when his age and that of the other band members at the time was taken into account. At the time of its release the album was praised for its atmosphere, evoking a feeling of "quiet, eerie solitude".

Reflecting on Kveldssanger with Rob Hughes for Unrestrained Magazine in 2007, Rygg commented, "I was just the singer, but I partook in the composition as well. I made some of the riffs, but I can't play the guitar very well. A lot of those songs were developed in the studio with basically a riff and a click track and layering the guitars. When a second theme came on top of the first theme we could kind of drop the first theme and develop on the second theme, and that's how we pieced the whole thing together. So it was, in a way, experimental. It was following its own natural logic, so to speak. We really didn't have a lot composed before we went into the studio, so already then we were using the studio as an instrument — as we still do — even though we had a more limited palette. And of course we had a different set of influences, or a narrower set of influences."

== Critical reception ==
Professional ratings
Review scores
Source	Rating
AllMusic	4/5 stars
Pitchfork	7.0/10

AllMusic writer William York commented, “This style was hinted at during some of the acoustic interludes on their previous album, Bergtatt, but here it has been more fully developed into actual songs with thoughtful, though sparse, arrangements. On some of the songs, Garm's vocals are heavily overdubbed to create a choir-like effect. He continues, "Listening to Kveldssanger, it is hard to picture this album being made by a group still in their teens, let alone by one whose next album would yield the savage black metal of Nattens madrigal. Kveldssanger stands as a bold and successful effort, one that helped certify Ulver's reputation as one of the leading black metal bands, even if it ironically doesn't involve any actual metal."

Lee Steadham described the album as "a passionately relayed Norwegian folk excursion, performed entirely on acoustic instruments. Vocals tend towards an obscure hymnal, almost Gregorian warble, though under-utilized, they're richly textured and melodiously delivered, complemented by an amalgamation of layered guitars, flutes, and cellos. There are literally zero modern equivalents to this pensive mood-setting oddity as rarely are such blatantly classical aspirations heard within the blackened subgenre. A somber and skillfully executed alternative to the norm; the entire affair just reeks of class."

Dutch webzine Evening of Flight added, "As said, Ulver's first three albums form a thematic and musical whole, and to be sure, Kveldssanger should not be seen as separate from the other two, both of which are classic albums in their own right. Kveldssanger can be said to have left the biggest mark on dark music since then. It is hard to imagine the music of projects like Vàli, October Falls, Musk Ox, Empyrium, etc. without this milestone. Indeed, many of these musicians would not pretend otherwise. While many have emulated this style however, some quite felicitously I might add, I have yet to hear an album that truly matches Kveldssanger in all its honesty, refinement, and originality."

== Track listing ==
All tracks are written by Håvard & Garm.

No.	Title	Length
1.	"Østenfor Sol Og Vestenfor Maane" ("East of the Sun and West of the Moon")	3:26
2.	"Ord" ("Words")	0:17
3.	"Høyfjeldsbilde" ("Mountaintop Picture")	2:15
4.	"Nattleite" ("Night Time")	2:12
5.	"Kveldssang" ("Twilight Song")	1:32
6.	"Naturmystikk" ("Nature Mystic")	2:56
7.	"A Cappella (Sielens Sang)" ("A Cappella (Song of the Soul)")	1:26
8.	"Hiertets Vee" ("The Heart's Woe")	3:55
9.	"Kledt I Nattens Farger" ("Clad in Colours of the Night")	2:51
10.	"Halling" ("Halling")	2:08
11.	"Utreise" ("Exodus")	2:57
12.	"Søfn-ør Paa Alfers Lund" ("Drowsiness on the Faerie Mound")	2:38
13.	"Ulvsblakk" ("The Black of a Wolf")	6:56
Total length:		35:29

2016 reissue bonus track
No.	Title	Length
14.	"Synen"	5:05
Total length:		40:34

== Personnel ==
Ulver

- Kristoffer Rygg (credited as Garm) - vocals, producer
- Håvard Jørgensen - acoustic guitar, producer
- Erik Olivier Lancelot - drums, percussion, flutes

Additional musicians

- Alf Gaaskjønli - cello

Other credits

- Maria Jaquete - artwork
- Craig Morris - mastering
- Kristian Romsøe - mixing
- Torgrim Novreit - photography
- Kristian Romsøe - co-producer, technician
- Tania "Nacht" Stene - cover design
