= Arcturus (band) =

Norwegian avant-garde metal band

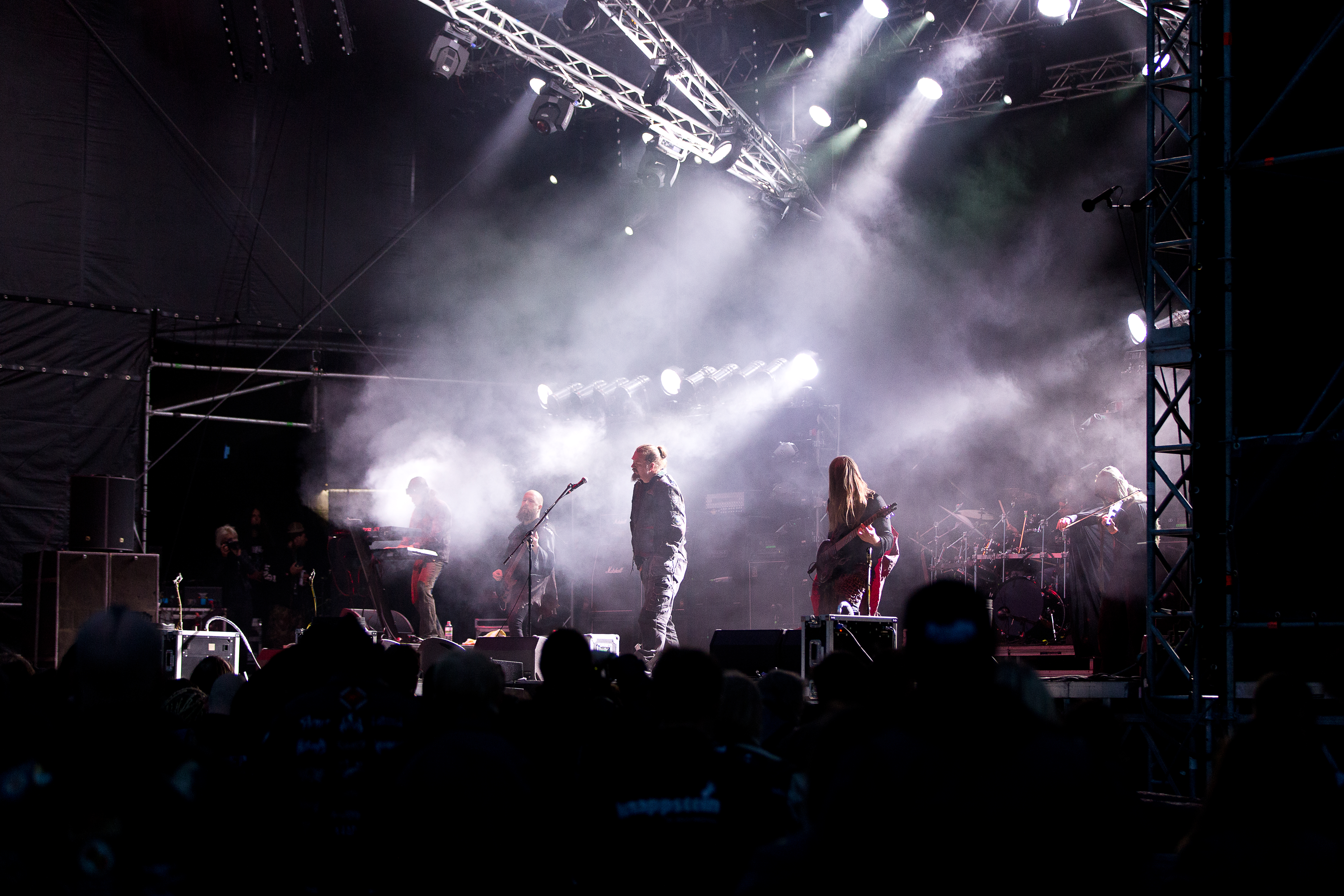
- Arcturus in 2016

Background information
- Origin: Norway
- Genres: Avant-garde metal; progressive metal; symphonic black metal
- Years active: 1991–2007, 2011–present
- Labels: Century Media, Music for Nations, Candlelight, The End, Jester, Season of Mist
- Members: Steinar Sverd Johnsen; Jan Axel Blomberg; Hugh Mingay; Knut Magne Valle; ICS Vortex
- Past members: (see below)

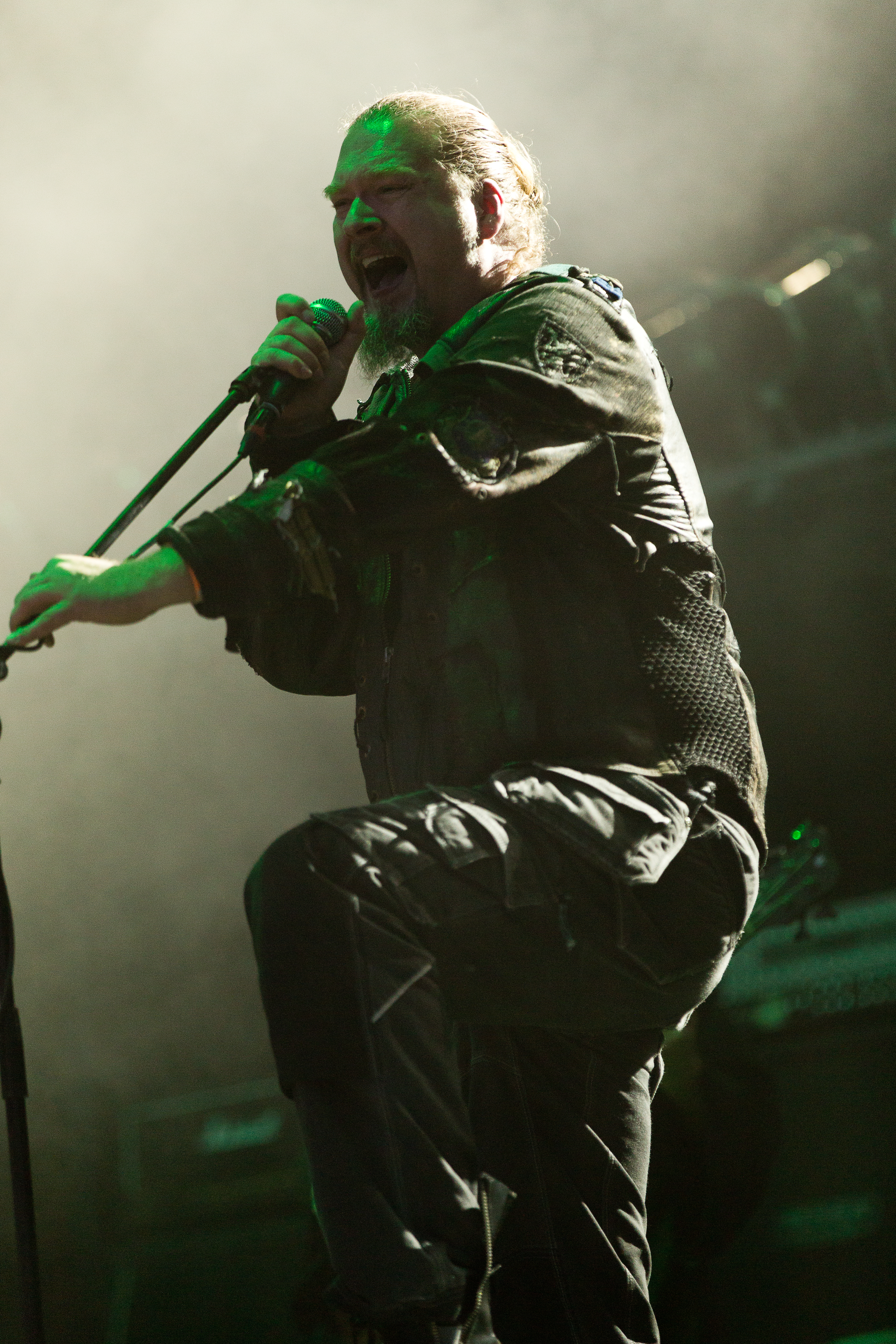
Simen „ICS Vortex“ Hestnæs at Party.San 2016

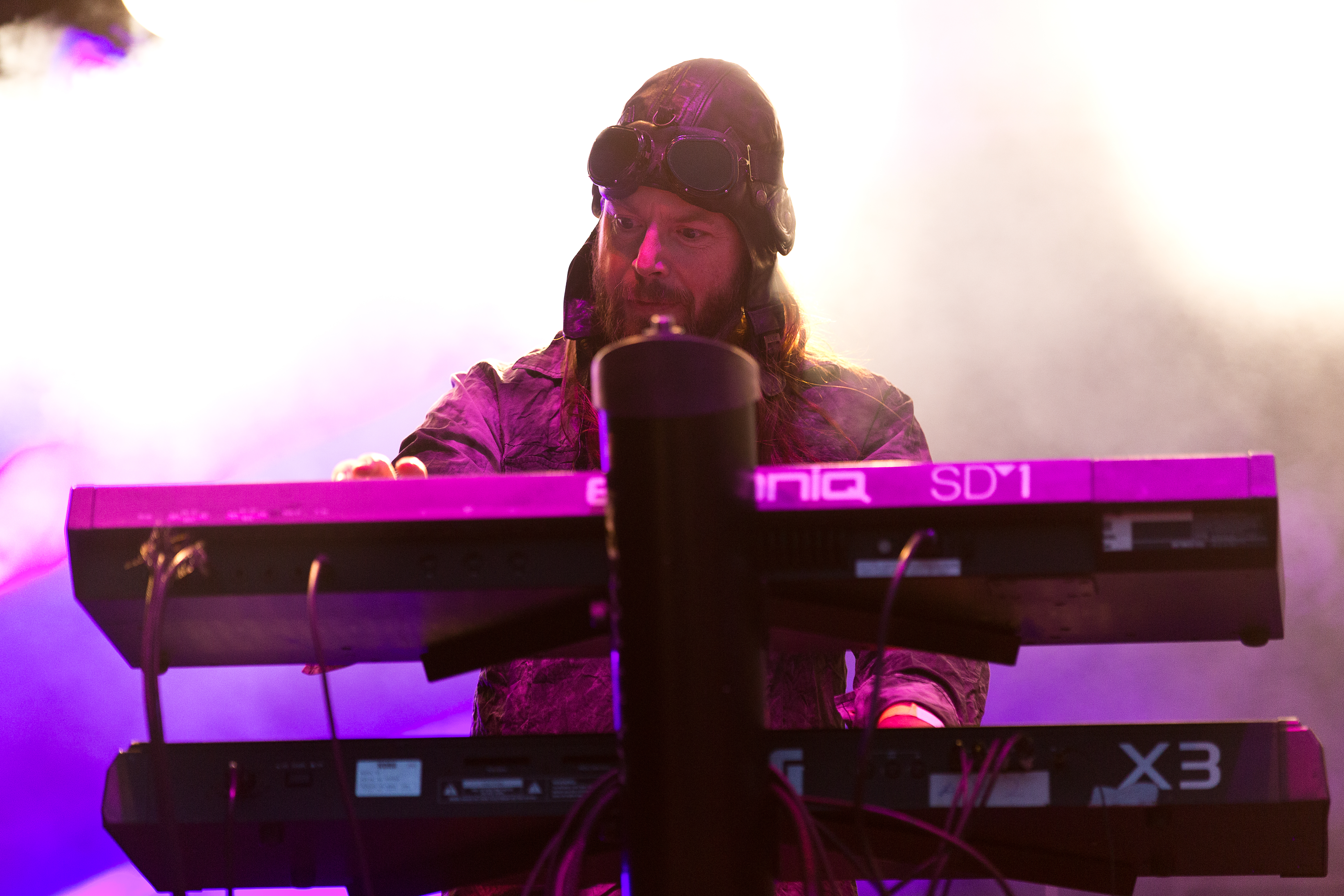
Steinar „Sverd“ Johnsen 2016

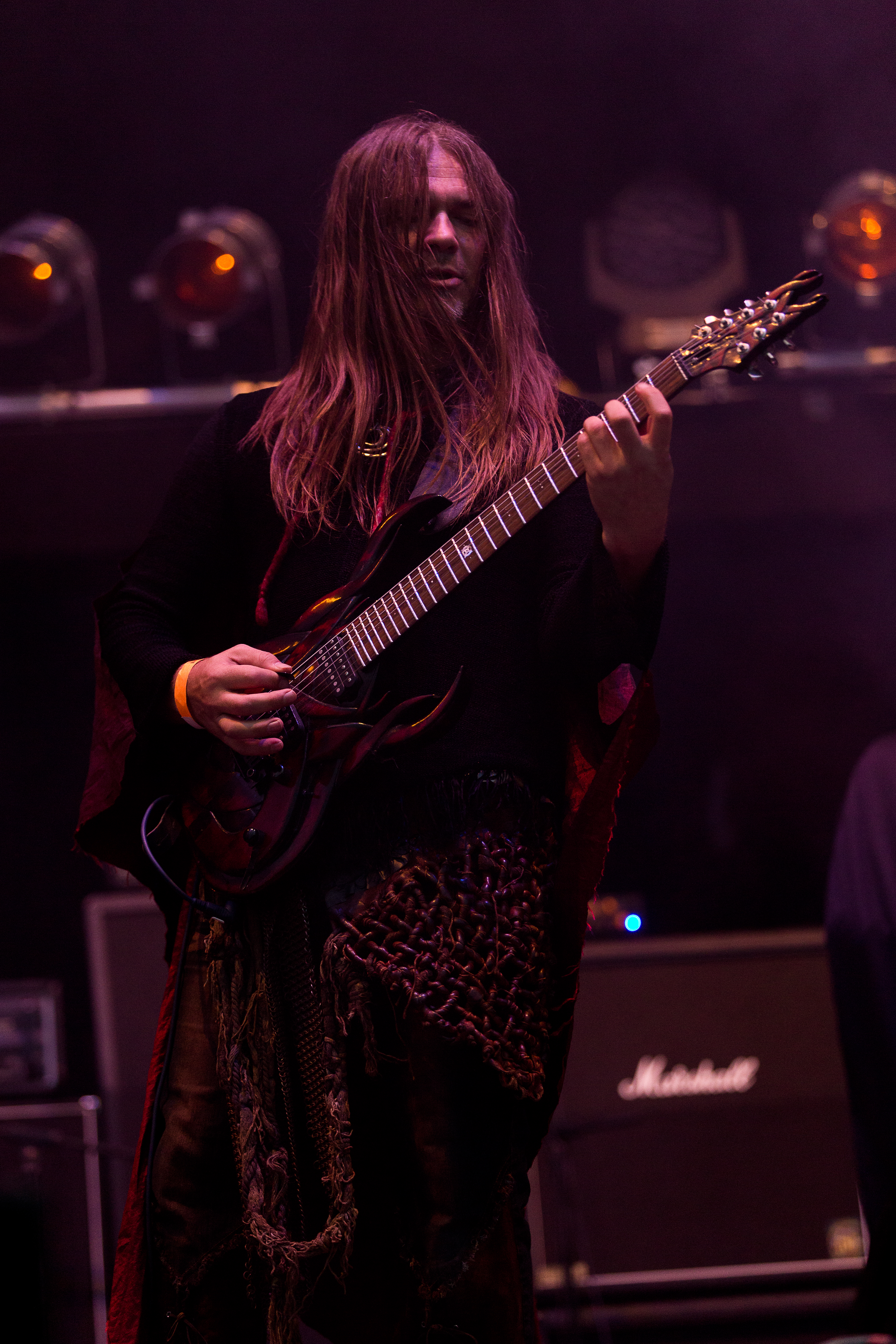
Knut Magne Valle 2016

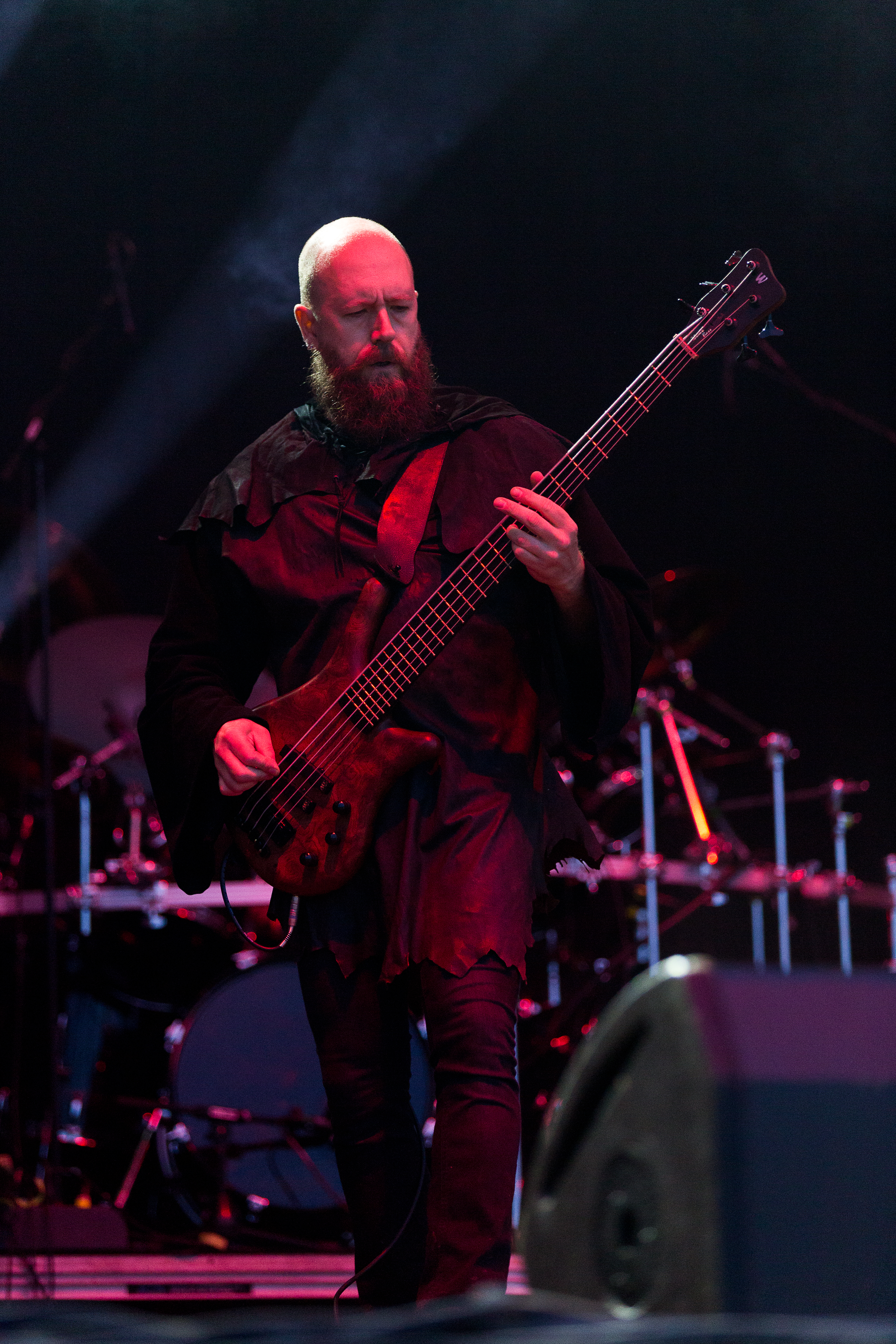
Hugh Mingay 2016

Arcturus is a Norwegian avant-garde/progressive metal band formed in 1991. They have experimented throughout their career, drawing influences and incorporating elements from black metal and classical music, while maintaining their metal roots. The band wears "flamboyant" costumes. Kenny Schticky of MetalSucks described their style as "an acquired taste".

The band has released five official albums. They have shared band members with Mayhem, Ulver, Dimmu Borgir. AllMusic stated that "with their full-length debut, Arcturus proved that they are some of the best black metallers of the late '90s."

Bryan Reesman of AllMusic considered the band's album Aspera Hiems Symfonia one of the best metal releases of all time, describing it as "a graceful mixture of classical majesty and black-metal brooding and aggression." The following album, La Masquerade Infernale, abandoned death growls and shrieks for heavy metal singing that Marc van der Pol of AllMusic called "semi-operatic". The album includes instrumental tracks, jungle beats, and other sounds that have drawn comparisons to industrial music.

== History ==
=== Early days ===
The original line-up changed when bassist/vocalist Marius Vold (formerly of Thorns) left the band. The band was labeled a black metal supergroup, consisting of Kristoffer "Garm" Rygg on vocals, Carl August Tidemann on guitar, Skoll on bass, and the two other original members, Hellhammer on drums and Steinar Sverd Johnsen as the main composer/keyboard player. In 1994, Samoth played guitar on the EP Constellation and released it on his record label, Nocturnal Art.

=== Post-Garm era ===
After three albums, Rygg departed the band. He was replaced with Øyvind Hægeland from Spiral Architect. Hægeland performed live with the band but did not record with them. On 5 January 2005, the band parted ways with Hægeland. He was succeeded by Simen "ICS Vortex" Hestnæs, who had sang on the Arcturus tracks "Master of Disguise", "The Chaos Path", and "Painting My Horror" on La Masquerade Infernale. Following Carl August Tidemann's departure, Knut Magne Valle joined the band. In 2003, Tore Moren joined on second guitar for live performances and eventually became an official member. Valle and Moren shared lead guitar. Valle used a 7-string guitar and Moren a standard 6-string guitar.

=== Breakup ===
On 16 April 2007, the band disbanded. Further details were revealed in an official statement on the band's website on 17 April. The statement confirmed ICS Vortex's introduction of a recent performance: "Welcome to the last Arcturus show — ever." The statement explained that the decision was made "some time ago," and that due to ongoing "things", the members could no longer "find the time to continue working with this band." The statement concluded with a tribute to the band's fans: "We are humble and grateful to all the people that have supported and loved us over the years."

=== Reunion ===
Hellhammer confirmed that an Arcturus reunion was inevitable and that Garm had expressed interest in participating. Garm later indicated that he was not interested.

ICS Vortex mentioned plans to resurrect "a band or three" in a blog post shortly after his removal from Dimmu Borgir.

ICS Vortex confirmed an Arcturus reunion show at the ProgPower USA 2011 Festival. Vortex stated, "Beloved freaks! ProgPower USA 2011 will host the first Arcturus concert in 5 years. This is our first performance in the United States, and since we're all retarded, probably the last." The planned show was canceled due to "hibernation sickness" and "outdated parts." Instead, Arcturus planned its first reunion show at Avant-Garde Night vol. 2 in Poland, but this was also canceled.

Arcturus performed their reunion show on 9 September 2011 at the KICK Nattklubb & Scene in Kristiansand, Norway. ICS Vortex confirmed that the band was working on an album. In 2012, they performed at the Inferno Metal Festival, Hellfest Summer Open Air, the O2 Academy in Islington, and the Eindhoven Metal Meeting. On 10 October 2014, Arcturus confirmed on Facebook that ICS Vortex had finished recording vocals for an untitled album.

After online speculation, on 26 February 2015, Arcturus signed with Prophecy Productions. They released the album Arcturian on 8 May. The label commented, "Arcturus are legend. Unparalleled in creativity, musicianship and artistic approach since their foundation days, mastermind Steinar 'Sverd' Johnsen and his cosmic crew, consisting of past and present members of bands like Ulver, Mayhem, Dimmu Borgir, Borknagar, and Ved Buens Ende, have been dancing their very own tightrope between genius and madness ever since. With each of their releases being an interstellar journey of its own and always ahead of their time, Arcturus can justifiably be labeled as the epitome of avant-garde metal..."

On 27 March 2015, Arcturus released "The Arcturian Sign," the first single from Arcturian. The album was released on 8 May of that year.

== Band members ==
=== Current ===
- Jan Axel "Hellhammer" Blomberg – drums (1991–2007, 2011–present)
- Steinar Sverd Johnsen – keyboards (1991–2007, 2011–present), guitars (1991–1993)
- Hugh "Skoll" Mingay – bass (1995–2000, 2002–2007, 2011–present)
- Knut Magne Valle – guitars (1995–2007, 2011–present)
- ICS Vortex – vocals (2005–2007, 2011–present)

=== Live ===
- Sebastian Grouchot – violin (2015–present)

=== Former ===
- Marius Vold – vocals, bass (1991–1993)
- Samoth – guitars, bass (1993–1995)
- Carl August Tidemann – guitars (1996–1997)
- Dag F. Gravem – bass (2001–2002)
- Kristoffer Rygg – vocals (1993–2003)
- Øyvind Hægeland – vocals (2003–2005)
- Tore Moren – guitars (2003–2007)

== Discography ==
=== Studio albums ===
- Aspera Hiems Symfonia (1996)
- La Masquerade Infernale (1997)
- The Sham Mirrors (2002)
- Sideshow Symphonies (2005)
- Arcturian (2015)

=== Singles and EPs ===
- My Angel (Single) (1991)
- Constellation (EP) (1994)

=== Compilations ===
- Disguised Masters (1999)
- Aspera Hiems Symfonia/Constellation/My Angel (2002)

=== Lives ===
- Shipwrecked in Oslo (2006)
