= La Masquerade Infernale =

Studio album by Arcturus
- Released: 27 October 1997
- Recorded: December 1996 – May 1997
- Studio: Jester Studio
- Genre: Progressive metal, avant-garde metal, symphonic metal
- Length: 45:12
- Label: Music for Nations, Misanthropy; Candlelight (reissue)
- Producer: Kristoffer Rygg, Knut M. Valle

Arcturus chronology
Aspera Hiems Symfonia (1996)	La Masquerade Infernale (1997)	Disguised Masters (1999)

Professional ratings
Review scores
Source	Rating
AllMusic	4/5 stars
Chronicles of Chaos	10/10
Kerrang!	3/5 stars

La Masquerade Infernale is the second studio album by Norwegian avant-garde metal band Arcturus. Released by Misanthropy Records in 1997, the album marks a change from the slow, nature-influenced symphonic black metal of their debut Aspera Hiems Symfonia. Most of the songs revolve around the themes of theatre, literature, and Satan. The screams characteristic of black metal utilized by Kristoffer Rygg on Aspera are replaced by a gruff, low-toned, clean vocal style. The album also features operatic singing and bizarre high-pitched singing from guest vocalist Simen Hestnæs, who nine years later would replace Rygg as the band's frontman. It was reissued by Candlelight Records in 2003.

In 2016, Metal Hammer listed it as among the greatest black metal releases of the 1990s. In 2021, it was elected by the same publication as the 12th-best symphonic metal album of all time.

== Track listing ==
No.	Title	Length
1.	"Master of Disguise"	6:42
2.	"Ad Astra"	7:40
3.	"The Chaos Path"	5:33
4.	"La Masquerade Infernale" (instrumental)	2:00
5.	"Alone"	4:39
6.	"The Throne of Tragedy"	6:33
7.	"Painting My Horror"	5:59
8.	"Of Nails and Sinners"	6:06
Total length:		45:12

- The album is actually 1:27 longer than listed due to the hidden track at the beginning of "Master of Disguise".
- The lyrics of "Alone" are taken from a poem by Edgar Allan Poe.
- "The Throne of Tragedy" is divided into 66 parts. At the end of the track, the sub-track counter will have increased to 66, making the display show the number 666.

== Personnel ==
Arcturus

- Kristoffer Rygg (credited as "Garm") – vocals, samples, electronics, production, mastering
- Knut Magne Valle – guitar, production
- Hugh Mingay (credited as "Skoll") – bass
- Steinar Sverd Johnsen (credited as "Sverd") – keyboards
- Jan Axel Blomberg (credited as "Hellhammer") – drums, percussion

Additional musicians

- Hans Josef Groh – cello
- Dorthe Dreier – viola
- Vegard Johnsen – violin
- Svein Haugen – double bass
- Simen Hestnæs – vocals on "The Chaos Path", backing vocals on "Master of Disguise" and "Painting My Horror"
- Carl August Tidemann – lead guitar on "Ad Astra" and "Of Nails And Sinners"
- Idun Felberg – cornet on "Ad Astra"
- Erik Olivier Lancelot – flute on "Ad Astra"

Other credits

- Børge Finstad – mixing
- Pål Klåstad – technician, engineering (strings)
- Marius Bodin – engineering (drums)
- Gandalf Stryke – mastering
