= Aspera Hiems Symfonia =

Studio album by Arcturus
- Released: 3 June 1996
- Recorded: July–August 1995
- Studios: Panser Studios, Oslo, Norway
- Genres: Symphonic black metal, progressive metal
- Length: 41:28
- Label: Ancient Lore Creations
- Producer: Arcturus

Arcturus chronology
Constellation (1994)	Aspera Hiems Symfonia (1996)	La Masquerade Infernale (1997)

Aspera Hiems Symfonia (Latin for "Harsh Winter Symphony") is the debut studio album by the Norwegian avant-garde metal band Arcturus. It has primarily a black metal sound, though still contains many of the experimental elements that would be expanded upon on their following albums, which saw the band shift permanently into the genres of avant-garde and progressive metal. Four of the album's songs are re-recorded versions of tracks from the Constellation EP, whereas the other four are new songs.

== Background ==
The music on Aspera is relatively down-tempo, atmospheric black metal, and is much more restrained in character and lyrical content than major black metal acts such as Mayhem and Darkthrone. The album's production is also thin and lo-fi in nature. The lyrical themes revolve around nature, winter, alchemy, astronomy, and Viking folklore and mythology.

== Reception ==
Professional ratings
Review scores
Source	Rating
AllMusic	4/5 stars
Chronicles of Chaos	9/10
Collector's Guide to Heavy Metal	7/10
Metal Storm	9/10
Rock Hard	8.5/10

AllMusic wrote, "Aspera is a powerhouse album chock full of charged riffs, sinister chants and howls and some wonderfully foreboding atmospheres", and called it "one of the best metal albums ever."

In 2013, Decibel ranked Aspera Heims Symfonia at number 45 on its list of the Top 100 Black Metal Albums of All Time.

== Re-release ==
In 2002, the album was remastered, along with the preceding EPs My Angel and Constellation. Re-released as a double disc, entitled Aspera Hiems Symfonia/Constellation/My Angel, it also contains two previously unreleased tracks, "The Deep Is The Skies" and "Cosmojam" at the beginning of Disc 2. The remastered version has a considerably stronger, clearer sound that restores many of the lower-frequency elements of the music lost in the original mastering.

Although the liner notes on the CD booklet state that Arcturus did not re-record any material, certain passages are evidently different from the originally released versions. Examples are the clean vocal sections in "Wintry Grey", "Naar Kulda Tar" and "Raudt Og Svart". The original synthesizer lines in the opening of "The Bodkin And The Quietus" are replaced by a similar but slightly more complex guitar solo. It is possible, but not confirmed, that these passages were not re-recorded and may have been spliced in from alternate, unreleased takes of the original material.

== Track listing ==
All tracks are written by Arcturus.

No.	Title	Length
1.	"To Thou Who Dwellest in the Night"	6:46
2.	"Wintry Grey"	4:34
3.	"Whence and Whither Goest the Wind"	5:15
4.	"Raudt og svart" ("Red and Black")	5:50
5.	"The Bodkin and the Quietus (...To Reach the Stars)"	4:36
6.	"Du nordavind" ("You Northwind")	4:00
7.	"Fall of Man"	6:06
8.	"Naar kulda tar (Frostnettenes prolog)" (When the Cold Takes Hold (Prologue to the Frostnights))	4:21
Total length:		41:28

=== Re-release track listing ===
Disc 1

1. "To Thou Who Dwellest in the Night" – 6:46
2. "Wintry Grey" – 4:34
3. "Whence and Whither Goest the Wind" – 5:14
4. "Raudt Og Svart" – 5:48
5. "The Bodkin and the Quietus" – 4:34
6. "Du Nordavind" – 3:59
7. "Fall of Man" – 6:05
8. "Naar Kulda Tar" – 4:21

Disc 2

1. "The Deep Is the Skies" – 4:19
2. "Cosmojam" – 1:45
3. "Raudt Og Svart" – 6:08
4. "Icebound Streams and Vapours Grey" – 4:44
5. "Naar Kulda Tar" – 4:28
6. "Du Nordavind" – 4:29
7. "My Angel" – 5:56
8. "Morax" – 6:28

== Personnel ==
Arcturus

- Kristoffer Rygg (credited as "Garm") – vocals
- Carl August Tidemann (credited as "August") – guitar
- Hugh Mingay (credited as "Skoll") – bass
- Steinar Sverd Johnsen (credited as "Sverd") – keyboards
- Jan Axel Blomberg (credited as "Hellhammer") – drums

Other credits

- Craig Morris – mastering
- Kristian Romsøe – mixing
- Christophe Szpajdel – logo design
