= Steinar Sverd Johnsen =

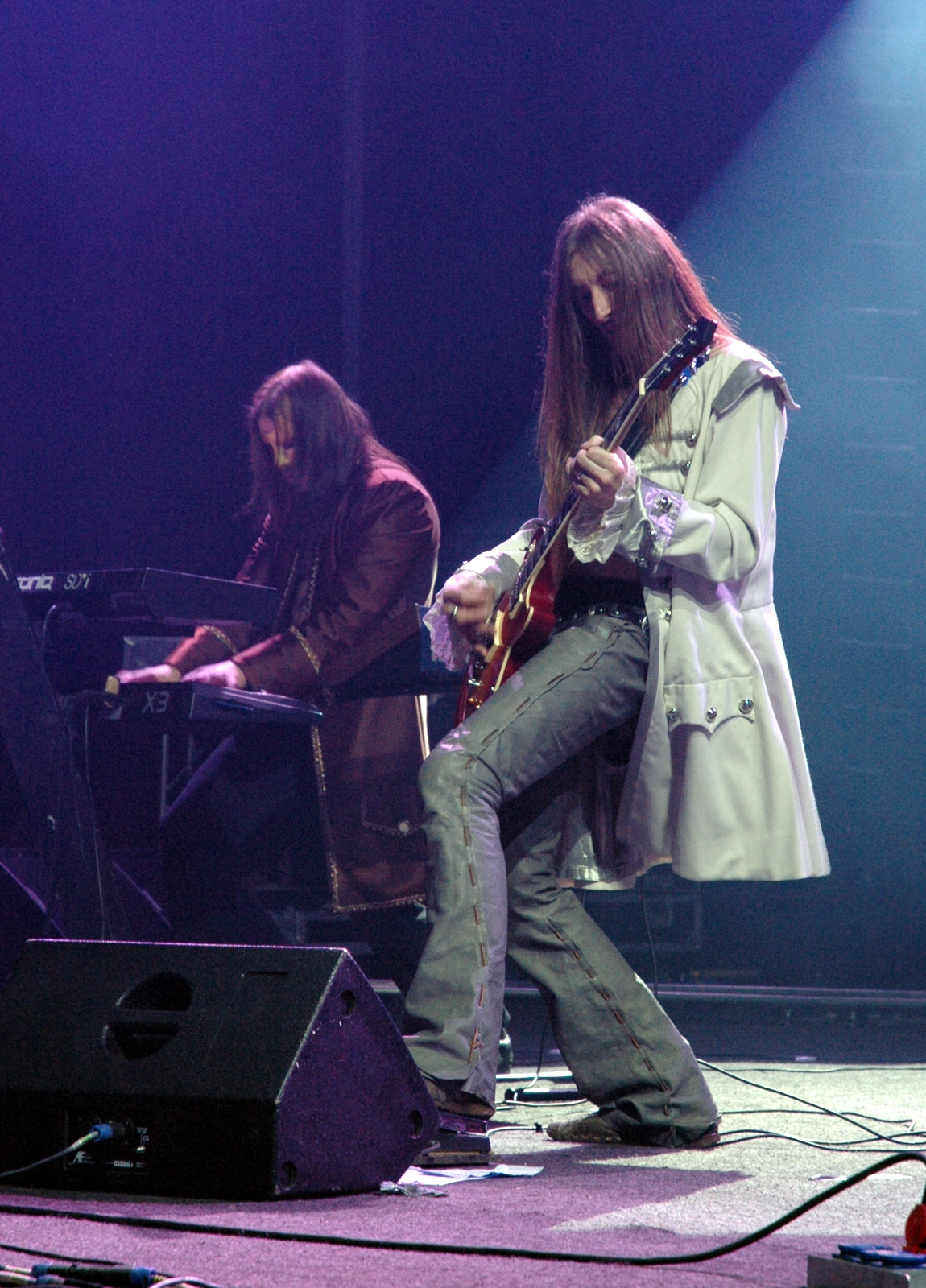
- Sverd (left) with Arcturus guitarist Tore Moren in 2005

Background information
- Born: 1972 (age 53–54)
- Origin: Norway
- Genres: Heavy metal; black metal; avant-garde metal; industrial metal
- Occupations: Musician; songwriter
- Instruments: Keyboards; synthesizer; piano; guitar
- Member of: Arcturus; The Kovenant

Steinar Sverd Johnsen (born 1972) is a Norwegian keyboardist and composer. Sverd plays keyboards and synthesizers in Arcturus and was also the main composer for the band. He formed the band with Marius Vold (Mortem, Stigma Diabolicum of Thorns, and Jan Axel Blomberg (also known as Hellhammer) of Mayhem in 1987, originally under the moniker Mortem (where he played guitar). The band split up in April 2007, but reformed in 2011.

In 1998, Sverd was recruited by the band, The Kovenant, known at the time as Covenant, along with Hellhammer. After the release of the album Nexus Polaris, Sverd and the band parted ways. Until his return to the band with the Nexus Polaris reunion in 2024.

Sverd has also been a guest on a few releases by prominent Norwegian black metal bands, Ulver and Satyricon.

== Discography ==
=== With Mortem ===
- Slow Death (demo, 1989)
- Slow Death (EP, 1990)
- Ravnsvart (LP, 2019)
- Slow Death (album + extra tracks, 2022)

=== With Arcturus ===
- Promo 90 (Demo, 1990)
- My Angel (EP, 1991)
- Constellation (EP, 1994)
- Aspera Hiems Symfonia (full-length, 1995)
- La Masquerade Infernale (full-length, 1997)
- Disguised Masters (compilation, 1999)
- Aspera Hiems Symfonia/Constellation/My Angel (compilation, 2001)
- The Sham Mirrors (full-length, 2002)
- Sideshow Symphonies (full-length, 2005)
- Shipwrecked in Oslo (live film, 2006)
- Arcturian (full-length 2015)

=== With Covenant ===
- Nexus Polaris (full-length, 1998)

=== As a session musician ===
- Satyricon - The Shadowthrone (full-length, 1994) (credited as S.S.)
- Ved Buens Ende - ...Coiled in Obscurity (compilation, 1995)

=== As a guest musician ===
- Ulver - Bergtatt - Et Eeventyr i 5 Capitler (full-length, 1995)
- Fleurety - Department of Apocalyptic Affairs - (full-length, 2000)
