= Bergtatt – Et eeventyr i 5 capitler =

Studio album by Ulver
- Released: February 1995
- Recorded: November and December 1994
- Studios: Endless Lydstudio, Oslo, Norway
- Genres: Atmospheric black metal; folk metal
- Length: 34:17
- Language: Dano-Norwegian
- Label: Head Not Found
- Producers: Ulver and Kristian Romsøe

Ulver chronology
Vargnatt (1993)	Bergtatt – Et eeventyr i 5 capitler (1995)	Kveldssanger (1996)

Bergtatt – Et eeventyr i 5 capitler (translated as "Spellbound – A Fairy Tale in 5 Chapters") is the debut studio album by the Norwegian band Ulver, issued in February 1995 via Head Not Found. The album was recorded at Endless Lydstudio in Oslo in November and December 1994 with Kristian Romsøe as engineer and co-producer.

The album was praised for its production atmosphere and was described as "mysterious, melancholic, eerie, and oddly tranquil". The archaic Dano-Norwegian lyrics were influenced by Scandinavian folktales and inspired by Baroque poets such as Ludvig Holberg and the hymn-writer Thomas Kingo.

== Background ==
Bergtatt, the first part of what has become known as "The Trilogie – Three Journeyes Through the Norwegian Netherworlde", was released during the rise of the Norwegian black metal subculture in Norway in the early 1990s. Separated from the more straightforward black metal sound of their contemporaries, Ulver incorporated elements of Norwegian folk music, utilizing acoustic guitars, droning low choirs, flutes, melody-focused songwriting and clean vocals together with fast tempos, shrieked vocals, highly distorted guitars, blast beat drumming, raw (lo-fi) recording and unconventional song structures.

The folk-like acoustic elements of Bergtatt were isolated and expanded upon for their second album Kveldssanger, incorporating classical guitars, cello and choral chamber chants overlaid with subtle orchestral landscapes. The band's third album, Nattens madrigal, abandoned these acoustic and atmospheric elements, and was recorded with an intentionally underproduced, "raw and grim black metal" sound.

In an interview with Rob Hughes for Unrestrained Magazine in 2007, Kristoffer Rygg reflected, "We were influenced by a period known as the Kingdom of Denmark–Norway (1536–1814)—the language and literature of that era combined with the superstition and folklore of the Middle Ages. It was the kind of stuff we were learning about in school at the time. When it comes to music, we were already listening to a whole slew of other things, and already had our two next records in mind, so by the time Nattens madrigal (1997) was released, we had developed a strong urge to explore something else. We had also acquired the knowledge of how to do so in the meantime."

== Critical reception ==
Professional ratings
Review scores
Source	Rating
AllMusic	4.5/5 stars
Pitchfork	8.7/10
Sputnikmusic	5/5 stars

AllMusic praised the album, writing, "Bergtatt is not the heaviest or most aggressive black metal around by a long shot; nor is it the most evil or blasphemous. What makes the album stand out, along with the varied vocal styles and the excellent songwriting, is its unique atmosphere—mysterious, melancholic, eerie and oddly tranquil."

Angry Metal Guy stated: "Musically, the album is focused on melody and atmosphere, it blends black metal with acoustics, reverb, and gorgeous, melancholic songwriting. It even eschews Satanism in text and imagery. Except Ulver was right there when it all went down; outsiders to a scene of outsiders." Going on to acknowledge Bergtatt's influence on Agalloch, Cormorant, Alcest and October Falls, the reviewer goes on to reflect "Bergtatt is the work of kids. These guys weren't old, they weren't seasoned; they were 16 and 17 when they started this band, and 18/19 when Bergtatt dropped on the famous Head Not Found label 2 years later. They were—from Garm's own mouth—not super mature or sophisticated."

In 2013, Decibel ranked Bergtatt at number 12 on its list of the Top 100 Black Metal Albums of All Time.

== Track listing ==
All tracks are written by Ulver.

No.	Title	Length
1.	"Capitel I: I Troldskog faren vild" ("Part One: Led Astray in the Forest Darke")	7:51
2.	"Capitel II: Soelen gaaer bag Aase need" ("Part Two: Betwixt Cragges a Descending Sunne")	6:34
3.	"Capitel III: Graablick blev hun vaer" ("Part Three: She Senses Eyne of Grey")	7:45
4.	"Capitel IV: Een Stemme locker" ("Part Four: A Voice Beckons Her")	4:01
5.	"Capitel V: Bergtatt - Ind i Fjeldkamrene" ("Part Five: Spellbound – Into the Mountaine")	8:06
Total length:		34:17

== Personnel ==
Ulver

- Kristoffer Rygg - vocals, lyrics
- Håvard Jørgensen - guitar
- Torbjørn Heimen Pedersen (Aismal) - guitar
- Hugh Mingay - bass guitar
- Erik Olivier "AiwarikiaR" Lancelot - drums, percussion

Additional Musicians

- Sverd - piano
- Lill Kathrine Stensrud - additional vocals, flute

Other Credits

- Kristian Romsøe - co-producer, engineer, mixing
- Craig Morris - mastering
- Tania "Nacht" Stene - album cover design

== Charts ==
Chart (2019)	Peak position
German Albums (Offizielle Top 100)	69
