= The Trilogie – Three Journeyes Through the Norwegian Netherworlde =

The Trilogie - Three Journeyes Through the Norwegian Netherworlde

Box set by Ulver
- Released: April 1997
- Recorded: 1994–1996
- Genre: Black metal, folk metal, folk music
- Length: 113:56
- Label: Century Media

Ulver chronology
| Nattens madrigal - Aatte hymne til ulven i manden (1997) | The Trilogie - Three Journeyes Through the Norwegian Netherworlde (1997) | Themes from William Blake's The Marriage of Heaven and Hell (1998) |

The Trilogie – Three Journeyes Through the Norwegian Netherworlde, sometimes shortened to The Trilogie, is a box set of albums by Norwegian black metal band Ulver, issued in 1997 via Century Media. Limited to 1000 copies, the set collects together Ulver's first three full-length albums, Bergtatt, Kveldssanger and Nattens madrigal in LP Picture Disc format, housed in a cardboard box, with a booklet & bonus posters. The set commemorates Ulver's black metal phase, before shifting styles dramatically into more ambient, electronic, and experimental music.

== Track listing ==
=== Bergtatt – Et Eeventyr i 5 Capitler ===
All tracks are written by Ulver

| No. | Title | Length |
|---|---|---|
| 1. | "Capitel I: I Troldskog faren vild" ("Led astray in the Forest darke") | 7:51 |
| 2. | "Capitel II: Soelen gaaer bag Aase need" ("Betwixt cragges a descending Sunne") | 6:34 |
| 3. | "Capitel III: Graablick blev hun vaer" ("She senses Eyne of Grey") | 7:45 |
| 4. | "Capitel IV: Een Stemme locker" ("A Voice Beckons Her") | 4:01 |
| 5. | "Capitel V: Bergtatt - Ind i Fjeldkamrene" ("Spellbound - Into the Mountaine") | 8:06 |
| Total length: | | 34:17 |

=== Kveldssanger ===
All tracks are written by Haavard & Garm

| No. | Title | Length |
|---|---|---|
| 1. | "Østenfor Sol og vestenfor Maane" ("East of the Sunne and West of the Moone") | 3:26 |
| 2. | "Ord" ("Wordes") | 0:17 |
| 3. | "Høyfjeldsbilde" ("The Mountainetops") | 2:15 |
| 4. | "Nattleite" ("Nighte Time") | 2:12 |
| 5. | "Kveldssang" ("Twilight Song") | 1:32 |
| 6. | "Naturmystikk" ("Naturall Mystick") | 2:56 |
| 7. | "A cappella (Sielens Sang)" ("A capella (Song of the Soule)") | 1:26 |
| 8. | "Hiertets Vee" ("The Heart's Woe") | 3:55 |
| 9. | "Kledt i Nattens Farger" ("Cladde in Colours of the Nighte") | 2:51 |
| 10. | "Halling" ("Halling") | 2:08 |
| 11. | "Utreise" ("Exodus") | 2:57 |
| 12. | "Søfn-ør paa Alfers Lund" ("Drowsieness on Fairie Mound") | 2:38 |
| 13. | "Ulvsblakk" ("Wolfsgrey") | 6:56 |
| Total length: | | 35:29 |

=== Nattens madrigal – Aatte hymne til ulven i manden ===
All lyrics are written by Garm

| No. | Title | Length |
|---|---|---|
| 1. | "Hymn I: Of Wolf and Fear" | 6:16 |
| 2. | "Hymn II: Of Wolf and the Devil" | 6:21 |
| 3. | "Hymn III: Of Wolf and Hatred" | 4:48 |
| 4. | "Hymn IV: Of Wolf and Man" | 5:21 |
| 5. | "Hymn V: Of Wolf and the Moon" | 5:14 |
| 6. | "Hymn VI: Of Wolf and Passion" | 5:48 |
| 7. | "Hymn VII: Of Wolf and Destiny" | 5:32 |
| 8. | "Hymn VIII: Of Wolf and the Night" | 4:38 |
| Total length: | | 43:58 |

== Personnel ==
Bergtatt

- Garm - vocals, lyrics
- Håvard Jørgensen - guitar
- Torbjørn Pedersen (Aismal) - guitar
- Erik Olivier Lancelot (AiwarikiaR) - drums
- Skoll - bass guitar
- Sverd - Piano
- Lill Kathrine Stensrud - Voice, Flute
- Kristian Romsøe - Co-producer, Engineer, Mixing
- Craig Morris - Mastering
- Tanya "Nacht" Stene - album cover design

Kveldssanger

- Garm - performer
- Håvard Jørgensen - performer
- Erik Olivier Lancelot - performer
- Alf Gaaskjønli - cello
- Artwork – Frk. Maria Jaquete, "Omslaget Er Mahlet Aff"
- Composed – Garm, Haavard
- Mastering – Craig Morris
- Mixed – Kristian Romsøe
- Photography – Torgrim Novreit
- Technician, Co-producer – Hr. Kristian Romsøe
- Cover Design – Tanya "Nacht" Stene

Nattens madrigal

- Garm – vocals
- Håvard Jørgensen – guitar
- Torbjørn Pedersen (Aismal) – guitar
- Erik Olivier Lancelot (AiwarikiaR) – drums
- Skoll – bass guitar
- Arranged By – Ulver
- Composed By – Garm, Haavard*
- Cover – Mrs. Tanya "Nacht" Stene*
- Engineer – Anders G. Offenberg Jr., Andun Johan Strype, Helge Sten*
- Lyrics – Garm, AiwarikiaR
- Photography – Helene Broch, Morten Andersen, Tanya "Nacht" Stene, Torgrim Røvreit
- Translation – Jørn Henrik Sværen, Kai Frost
