= Nattens madrigal =

Nattens Madrigal – Aatte Hymne Til Ulven I Manden

Studio album by Ulver
- Released: 3 March 1997
- Recorded: 1996
- Genre: Black metal
- Length: 43:58
- Language: Norwegian
- Label: Century Media

Ulver chronology
Kveldssanger (1996)	Nattens Madrigal – Aatte Hymne Til Ulven I Manden (1997)	The Trilogie - Three Journeyes Through the Norwegian Netherworlde (1997)

Ulver studio album chronology
Kveldssanger (1996)	Nattens Madrigal – Aatte Hymne Til Ulven I Manden (1997)	Themes from William Blake's The Marriage of Heaven and Hell (1998)

Nattens Madrigal – Aatte Hymne Til Ulven I Manden (translated as "Madrigal of the Night – Eight Hymns to the Wolf in Man") is the third studio album by Norwegian band Ulver, issued on 3 March 1997 via Century Media Records. Composed and arranged during the first half of 1995, Nattens is a concept album about wolves, the night, the moon, and the dark side of mankind.

== Overview ==
The third and final album in what has become known as Ulver's “Black Metal Trilogie,” Nattens madrigal marked the band's international debut and showcases an abrasive black metal style similar to the darker, heavier tracks on Bergtatt, abandoning acoustic and atmospheric elements with an intentionally underproduced sound.

An urban legend regarding the album is that the band spent the recording budget on Armani suits, cocaine and a Corvette and recorded the album outdoors in a Norwegian forest on an 8-track. Vocalist Kristoffer Rygg, however, has stated that this is not true and possibly a rumour started by Century Media. Commenting on the rumours surrounding Nattens Madrigal, Rygg said, "Do you really think that Century Media advanced us so much that we could buy a black Corvette? Maybe some suits and drugs; I won't deny that. Or deny that we recorded it cheap. I'll let the myth carry on." Continuing,

We didn't have anything to do with those rumours. The moment the big labels picked up black metal, that was the beginning of the end of black metal as far as I see it. They started to exploit the genre by stuff like that-dumb sales pitches-that took the heart out of a lot of it. It became very banal. I'm not blaming Century Media, but I definitely think that that marked the beginning of the end of black metal for me. Putting out Nattens Madrigal via a big label was kind of an antagonistic move. They probably expected a prettied-up Bergtatt, you know? We didn't want to conform to any business model. We still don't. It got into the mainstream and people became very adept at playing and producing professional records, and as a result of that it lost a lot of the magic that it held to me when I was a teenager listening to old Celtic Frost rehearsals, or old Mayhem demos. I'm still very much like that. I'd rather listen to old lo-fi recordings than the perfect retro-band, you know. So I was part of a different scene, a different vibe.

Adding, "We composed Nattens Madrigal quite quickly after Bergtatt. And while we were rehearsing the Madrigal we recorded Kveldssanger, the second one. So I think that we spent about a year on that record. It was written in '95, recorded in '96, and was finally released early '97."

Metal Injection concluded "Kveldssanger had no electric instruments, Nattens Madrigal had no acoustic instruments, but Bergtatt has both acoustic and electric instruments; it's like they spliced the elements from Bergtatt into two separate albums. If that's the case, then Nattens Madrigal really showcases the black metal prowess of the band. The album answers exactly why people were so angered by Ulver's transition away from black metal, and why people are still bitter at their direction today." Despite this, there is an acoustic interlude in the first track.

== Critical reception ==
Professional ratings
Review scores
Source	Rating
AllMusic	4/5 stars
Chronicles of Chaos	8/10
Collector's Guide to Heavy Metal	4/10
Pitchfork	8.2/10
Rock Hard	5.0/10
Sputnikmusic	5/5

Writing for AllMusic, Steve Huey argues that the essence of the album is its "sheer sonic force", which John Chedsey, writing for Satan Stole My Teddybear, finds unpleasant, remarking, however, that the songwriting is an inventive "tour de force" of extreme black metal.

In 2009, IGN included Nattens madrigal in their "10 Great Black Metal Albums" list. In 2013, Decibel ranked it at number 33 on its list of the Top 100 Black Metal Albums of All Time.

== Track listing ==
All lyrics are written by Kristoffer Rygg; all music is composed by Kristoffer Rygg and Håvard Jørgensen.

No.	Title	Length
1.	"Hymne I: Wolf and Fear"	6:16
2.	"Hymne II: Wolf and the Devil"	6:21
3.	"Hymne III: Wolf and Hatred"	4:48
4.	"Hymne IV: Wolf and Man"	5:21
5.	"Hymne V: Wolf and the Moon"	5:14
6.	"Hymne VI: Wolf and Passion"	5:48
7.	"Hymne VII: Wolf and Destiny"	5:32
8.	"Hymne VIII: Wolf and the Night"	4:38
Total length:		43:58

== Personnel ==
Ulver

- Kristoffer Rygg (credited as "Garm") – vocals, lyrics
- Håvard Jørgensen – guitar
- Torbjørn Heimen Pedersen (Aismal) – guitar
- Hugh Mingay (Skoll) – bass guitar
- Erik Olivier "AiwarikiaR" Lancelot – drums, percussion, lyrics

Other Credits

- Ulver - arrangements
- Tanya "Nacht" Stene - album cover design, photography
- Anders G. Offenberg Jr., Andun Johan Strype and Helge Sten - engineering
- Helene Broch, Morten Andersen and Torgrim Røvreit - additional photography
- Jørn Henrik Sværen and Kai Frost - lyric translation

== Trivia ==
A poster for Nattens madrigal appears in an episode of the HBO drama The Sopranos.

The poster also appears in the movie Senseless.
