= My Own Wolf: A New Approach to Ulver =

Compilation album by various artists
- Released: December 25, 2007
- Genre: Black metal, dark ambient, electronica, avant-garde, noise, folk, breakbeat, darkwave
- Length: 155:34
- Label: Aspherical Asphyxia

My Own Wolf: A New Approach to Ulver is a tribute album to the Norwegian band Ulver. It features twenty-six different artists from around the world covering material from almost every Ulver release, ranging from the demo Vargnatt up through the album Blood Inside.

== Releases ==
The album was released for free download on December 25, 2007. In 2008, the album was released on CD by German label Cold Dimensions.

== Track list ==
Disc 1
No.	Title	Music	Length
1.	"Lost in Moments" (from Perdition City with the lyrics partially taken from "Dead City Centres")	Unfurl	6:36
2.	"Utreise" (from Kveldssanger)	Avathar	3:49
3.	"Blinded by Blood" (from Blood Inside)	Mura Hachigu feat. Nokturnes feat. N. Sandoval	7:28
4.	"Le trône de la tragédie" ("Tragediens Trone" from Vargnatt)	Smohalla	5:25
5.	"Wolf and Hatred" (from Nattens Madrigal)	Asmodée	4:55
6.	"Wolf and Devil" (from Nattens Madrigal)	Selvmord	6:10
7.	"Wolf and Passion" (from Nattens Madrigal)	Sael	4:58
8.	"Wolf and Destiny (Forest Fire version)" (from Nattens Madrigal)	Otzepenevshiye	6:04
9.	"Nattens madrigal" (from Vargnatt)	Wardaemonic	6:25
10.	"Graablick blew hun vaer" (from Bergtatt)	FB[Force]	6:33
11.	"Naturmystikk" (from Kveldssanger)	Karna	4:16
12.	"Not Saved" (from Silencing the Singing)	Fluoryne	5:26
13.	"Nowhere/Catastrophe" (from Perdition City)	Year Zero	3:49
14.	"Tomorrow Never Knows" (from Perdition City)	Sinestesia	8:21

Disc 2
No.	Title	Music	Length
1.	"In the Red" (from Blood Inside)	Pryapisme	3:49
2.	"Catalept" (from Perdition City)	Joey Hopkins Midget Factory	2:09
3.	"Eitttlane" (from A Quick Fix of Melancholy)	Aidan Baker	10:31
4.	"Porn Piece or the Scars of Cold Kisses" (from Perdition City)	Panacea Enterpainment	6:32
5.	"Ulver" (medley based on "Dressed in Black" from Blood Inside)	project:a	6:50
6.	"Høyfjeldsbilde" (from Kveldssanger)	Cataplus	3:17
7.	"Gnosis" (from Metamorphosis)	Jääportit	11:01
8.	"Lyckantropen Themes" (medley based on Lyckantropen Themes)	Wheel of Knowledge	5:33
9.	"Kledt i nattens farget" (from Kveldssanger)	Zweizz	4:08
10.	"Utreise" (from Kveldssanger)	Bosque	3:57
11.	"Darling, Didn't We Kill You?" (from Silencing the Singing)	Noises of Russia	7:33
12.	"The Marriage of Heaven & Hell Medley" (medley based on Themes from William Blake's The Marriage of Heaven and Hell)	Ashtar	9:59

Latter CD digipak version of the tribute, released by Cold Dimensions, contains quite different version of the "Lost in Moments" cover and tracks "Tomorrow Never Knows" and "Ulver" are swapped.

== Credits ==
- Oleg Paschenko – cover art
- Ivan 'Fever' (head of Aspherical Asphyxia) – management, mixing of tracks 4 and 10 on disc 2, final mastering
