= Jørn H. Sværen =

Norwegian writer

Jørn Henrik Sværen
- Born: 12 November 1974 (age 51); Drammen, Norway
- Occupations: Author, translator, editor, publisher, musician
- Writing career
- Genres: Poetry, short prose, essays
- Website: www.englandforlag.no

Jørn Henrik Sværen (born 12 November 1974) is a Norwegian author, publisher, translator and musician. He ran the small press H Press from 2004–2009, and currently runs England Forlag (England Press). He has been a member of the band Ulver since 2000.

In 2011, Kolon Forlag published Dronning av England, a collection of Sværen's texts originally published in journals and catalogues, as well as handmade chapbooks from England Forlag. Queen of England, Sværen's translation of the book into English, was published by Black Square Editions in January 2017. In 2020, Kolon Forlag published a second collection of Sværen's works, Britisk museum (British Museum).

Sværen was the editor of Den engelske kanal (The English Channel), an annual poetry journal dedicated to Scandinavian poetry and international poetry in translation, published by Kolon Forlag from 2013–2019. In 2020, Sværen started a new publishing project, Gresshoppene har ingen konge (The Locusts Have No King), a magazine printed at irregular intervals in other Scandinavian literary magazines.

== Bibliography ==
- En kirke (A Church) (Oslo: England Forlag, 2007)
- Et barn eller en bok (A Child or a Book) (Oslo: England Forlag, 2008)
- London (Oslo: England Forlag, 2009)
- Tre bøker (Three books) (Oslo: England Forlag, 2010)
- Dronning av England (Queen of England) (Oslo: Kolon Forlag, 2011, ISBN 9788205411937)
- Det ferdige verkets skjønnhet (The Beauty of the Finished Work) (Stockholm: Chateaux, 2013)
- Vi er tiggere (We Are Beggars) (Oslo: England Forlag, 2014)
- Håndtak (Handle) (Oslo: England Forlag, 2015)
- Bordkort (Place Cards) (Oslo: England Forlag, 2016)
- Et barn bærer (A Child Carries) (Oslo: England Forlag, 2016)
- Dronningburet (The Queen Cage) (Oslo: England Forlag, 2018)
- Klokkene (The Clocks) (Oslo: England Forlag, 2019)
- Britisk museum (British Museum) (Oslo: Kolon Forlag, 2020, ISBN 9788205538948)
- To bøker (Two Books) (Oslo: England Forlag, 2021, ISBN 9788293511021)
- Heraldisk nøkkel (Heraldic Key) (Oslo: England Typografisk Verksted, 2022, ISBN 9788269291704)

== In translation ==
- As figuras (The Figures) (trans. Øyunn Rishøi Hedemann and Emilio Araúxo, Santiago de Compostela: Amastra-n-Gallar, 2011)
- Trois livres (Three books) (trans. Jørn H. Sværen, Corbières: à la Pension Victoria, 2011)
- Dronning af England (Queen of England) (trans. Andreas Vermehren Holm, Copenhagen: Forlaget Virkelig, 2013)
- Ord og handling (Words and Deeds) (trans. Andreas Vermehren Holm, Copenhagen: Forlaget Virkelig, 2013)
- La Beauté de l’œuvre finie (The Beauty of the Finished Work) (trans. Jørn. H. Sværen, supplement, L'usage 5, Corbières, 2013)
- Vi er tiggere (We Are Beggars) (trans. Andreas Vermehren Holm, Copenhagen: Forlaget Virkelig, 2015)
- Det færdige værks skønhed (The Beauty of the Finished Work) (trans. Andreas Vermehren Holm, Copenhagen: Forlaget Virkelig, 2016)
- Bordkort (Place Cards) (trans. Andreas Vermehren Holm, Copenhagen: Forlaget Virkelig, 2016)
- Håndtag (Handle) (trans. Andreas Vermehren Holm, Copenhagen: Forlaget Virkelig, 2016)
- Queen of England (trans. Jørn H. Sværen, New York: Black Square Editions, 2017, ISBN 9780989810333)
- Dronningeburet (The Queen Cage) (trans. Andreas Vermehren Holm, Copenhagen: Forlaget Virkelig, 2018)
- Hvidt og sort (White and Black) (trans. Andreas Vermehren Holm, Copenhagen: Forlaget Virkelig, 2018)
- Fyra väggar (Four Walls) (trans. Jørn H. Sværen, Stockholm: Chateaux, 2019, ISBN 9789198429336)
- Drottning av England (Queen of England) (trans. Oscar Rossi, Stockholm: Bokförlaget Faethon, 2019, ISBN 9789198514858)
- Blanc et noir (White and Black) (trans. Emmanuel Reymond, Brussels: Vies Parallèles 2020, ISBN 9782931057032)
- Reine d'Angleterre (Queen of England) (trans. Emmanuel Reymond, Marseilles: Éric Pesty Éditeur, 2020, ISBN 9782917786628)
- Britisk museum (British Museum) (trans. Andreas Vermehren Holm, Copenhagen: Rue Lord Byron, 2021 ISBN 9788793499645)

== Translations ==
- Emmanuel Hocquard: En prøve på ensomhet (Oslo: H Press, 2006)
- Claude Royet-Journoud: Omveltningen; Begrepet hindring; Objektene inneholder det uendelige; De udelelige naturer (Oslo: H Press, 2009)
- Emmanuel Hocquard: Lysforhold (Oslo: Forlaget Oktober, 2012)
- Keith Waldrop: Vitruvius' lodd (Oslo: Kolon Forlag, 2013, ISBN 978-82-05-45820-8)
- Claude Royet-Journoud: De enkle legemers endelighet (Oslo: Kolon Forlag, 2018, ISBN 9788205516809)
- Andreas Vermehren Holm: Alle tegn i samme natt (Moss: H//O//F, 2018, ISBN 9788293317913)
- Mei-mei Berssenbrugge: Hallo, rosene (Oslo: Kolon Forlag, 2019, ISBN 9788205492233)
- Claude Royet-Journoud: Preposisjonenes teori (Oslo: Kolon Forlag, 2021, ISBN 9788205553804)
- Andreas Vermehren Holm: Metanoia-trilogien (Moss: H//O//F, 2022, ISBN 9788284170237)
- Claude Royet-Journoud: Hjertets attributter og bruk (Oslo: Kolon Forlag, 2022, ISBN 9788205578050)

== Journals ==
- Mazdak Shafieian and Jørn H. Sværen (eds.): Teologi (Oslo: Sola scriptura, 2012)
- Jørn H. Sværen (ed.): Den engelske kanal (Oslo: Kolon Forlag, 2013, ISBN 9788205452756)
- Jørn H. Sværen (ed.): Den engelske kanal (Oslo: Kolon Forlag, 2014, ISBN 9788205468030)
- Jørn H. Sværen (ed.): Den engelske kanal (Oslo: Kolon Forlag, 2015, ISBN 9788205484023)
- Jørn H. Sværen (ed.): Den engelske kanal (Oslo: Kolon Forlag, 2016, ISBN 9788205494596)
- Jørn H. Sværen (ed.): Den engelske kanal (Oslo: Kolon Forlag, 2017; ISBN 9788205505155)
- Jørn H. Sværen (ed.): Den engelske kanal (Oslo: Kolon Forlag, 2018; ISBN 9788205515222)
- Jørn H. Sværen (ed.): Den engelske kanal (Oslo: Kolon Forlag, 2019; ISBN 9788205526136)
- Jørn H. Sværen (ed.): Gresshoppene har ingen konge (2020–)

== Discography ==
- Silence Teaches You How to Sing (2001)
- Silencing the singing (2001)
- Lyckantropen Themes (2002)
- A Quick Fix of Melancholy (2003)
- Svidd neger (2003)
- Blood Inside (2005)
- Shadows of the Sun (2007)
- Wars of the Roses (2011)
- The Norwegian National Opera (2011)
- Childhood's End (2012)
- Messe I.X-VI.X (2013)
- Terrestrials (2014)
- ATGCLVLSSCAP (2016)
- Riverhead (2016)
- The Assassination of Julius Caesar (2017)
- Sic Transit Gloria Mundi (2017)
- Drone Activity (2019)
- Flowers of Evil (2020)
