= Shadows of the Sun =

Studio album by Ulver
- Released: 1 October 2007
- Recorded: Ambassaden, Oslo, Norway 2006–2007
- Genre: Ambient; electronic; modern classical; experimental
- Length: 39:58
- Label: Jester/The End
- Producer: Ulver

Ulver chronology
Blood Inside (2005)	Shadows of the Sun (2007)	Wars of the Roses (2011)

Alternative cover
- Vinyl release cover.

Shadows of the Sun is the seventh studio album by the Norwegian experimental electronica band Ulver. Produced by Ulver, the album was issued in October 2007 via Jester Records and The End Records. Officially announced on 13 July 2007, Shadows of the Sun received critical acclaim on release, and was described as "dark and tragic", with "soothing electronics and natural percussion". The album features contributions from Pamelia Kurstin on theremin, Mathias Eick on trumpet, and Austrian white noise musician Christian Fennesz adding electronics (described as "supplemental shimmer") and helping Ulver to correspond with their vision on the final product.

== History ==
The track listing and the album sleeve was released to the public in a press statement by Ulver's American record label The End Records, and a teaser for the song "Vigil" was released on MySpace on 29 August 2007. On 30 August Ulver announced a release party for the album to be held at the Europa Night Club in Brooklyn, New York on 20 September 2007 with Kristoffer Rygg and Tore Ylwizaker DJing, while The Austerity Program and Lapdog of Satan were playing live.

On 13 September 2007 Jester Records made it possible to pre-order the album, including a limited vinyl edition, with alternate front cover by David D'Andrea. The collector's deal also included a 10" red vinyl edition of A Quick Fix of Melancholy. The End Records also released a special deal consisting of the CD edition of the album, a T-shirt, and a screen print by Tomi Lahdesmaki in a limited run of 200.

The release of Shadows of the Sun was delayed in Europe and the United States, possibly caused by problems with the vinyl manufacturing. The album was distributed by Plastic Head, the UK's tenth largest distributor in Europe.

The entire album was leaked to the Internet on 17 September 2007.

"Solitude" is a Black Sabbath cover; the original version appears on their 1971 album Master of Reality, while "Eos" is a revisited version of "Gravferd", from the soundtrack of the Norwegian film Uno. "What Happened?" contains approximately 1 minute and 40 seconds of silence at the end.

The front photo is taken from the October 1978 issue of Natural History Magazine.

Shadows of the Sun is the first album without an appearance from Håvard Jørgensen, a full-time member on Ulver's first four albums and a guest on their last two.

In February 2008, the album won the Oslo Awards prize for album of the year 2007. The album was also voted best album of 2007 at the website Sonic Frontiers.

In December 2014, Shadows of the Sun was released as a sheet music album by Raven Music Editions. All the songs, except for the Black Sabbath cover "Solitude", were included in the songbook.

== Background ==
In an interview with Music Information Centre Norway, Ulver member Tore Ylwizaker commented on the album. He said it would be downplayed and inspired by chamber music in both style and crew. Ylwizaker also took a year off to study classical composers and composition techniques, and said he took a particular liking to Igor Stravinsky's The Firebird.

Rygg described Shadows of the Sun as "our most personal record to date." Commenting in Unrestrained magazine in 2007, Rygg said, "I'm a diagnosed depressive, and should have been trying to focus on living, but instead I've immersed myself in some isolated, dark and paranoid place. It has no doubt helped make this album what it is, but it's a prison of the mind." Adding, “Sometimes all I see is darkness; it's overpowering. So this record is about venting out a lot of that stuff, the gloom, but it also represents some kind of quiet acceptance. Like this is how the situation is, and you're just gonna have to live with it. Use it for what it's worth."

On the album's evolution, Rygg commented, "I was pretty set on keeping it more bare this time. When we did Blood Inside, we'd been holding back with all that minimal stuff for so long — the soundtracks (Lyckantropen Themes and Svidd neger), the Silence EPs and all that. So Blood Inside was an outburst of sorts. I guess this record is a withdrawal again, so that's an inherent dynamic...flux and reflux."

Commenting on the use of the Oslo Session String Quartet, Rygg said, "We worked a lot with simulating stringed instruments, so it's always good for us to get some people in and play the real thing. I suppose strings and piano are our instruments of preference; those are the sounds we like to work with. That timbre, you know? In terms of writing music — not that we really write music per se, but say we did write music, we'd write it for strings and piano." Adding, "A lot of times when we get musicians into the studio we just get them to play along with preliminary ideas or themes. We can record hours of music and end up using one minute of it. But this time we had the body of the songs before the string quartet came, and we wrote down a part for them. It was a little more disciplined than before."

Rygg, commenting in Unrestrained magazine, said, "The first song, “Eos,” is an embellishment of a piece that we did for a funeral theme in the movie Uno. So you can use the same source material in different contexts. If you're in a different place at a different time and in a different frame of mind you can use stuff that originally didn't go anywhere, and make something of it. So yeah, we keep everything, but, man, it's a lot of music and ideas lying on the backups these days. I'm guessing 10 per cent of what we start ends up as something presentable. We feel like a lot of things are interesting for 30 seconds or so, but then what? We could probably sell riffs to rock bands, sell hundreds of riffs or piano themes or whatever, but our main problem is to tie elements together—to 'bring it home,' as they say. We are quite selective."

Rygg commented in Terrorizer magazine, in 2007: “Lyrically, the album is very simple. It's the basics - life, love, loss. And, of course, death. It's been a humbling record to make, and has kind of beaten us down. People will no doubt say that it's pretentious, but that's not how it felt when we were doing it." Continuing, “The lyrics are always the biggest challenge. We have these writer's nights sometimes, Jørn [Sværen] and I, where we go to my parents' cottage with something to drink, some music and just dedicate ourselves to writing."

Commenting on Ulver's evolution, Rygg said, "I don't think anyone will be surprised. The shock value is gone, I think it went away with Metamorphosis. Since then, the changes haven't been fundamental at all.” Continuing, “I think the shapeshifting story is one that has been greatly exaggerated by the media. There have been a couple of twists and turns after the Blake record, that's granted, but nothing too significant. I see Ulver as having a part one and a part two. And that's a division that we already had in our minds before those first three albums were even finished. We already knew we were going somewhere else after Nattens madrigal. Due to logistics, we had to wait almost two years until that one got released, and in the interim we had amassed a huge array of influences. We were out of our teens and our outlook was becoming more complex."

"One of the original ideas for this album was to have no percussion whatsoever. We ended up having to use it but we limited it as much as we could. We usually have some sort of mental picture of what we're going to do and set out all sorts of guidelines for ourselves to get there. But as soon as we get working, the process takes precedence. The control room gets out of control, in a manner of speaking. We start with lots of belief in ourselves and our abilities, and end up in nothing but mistrust and dissolution.”

Discussing the influence aesthetic for Shadows of the Sun and the influence of chamber music, Rygg commented, “There's no specific aesthetic other than a sense of the beautiful itself, I suppose. There's a connection to classical composition, that's pretty obvious. Some Wagner transpositions. Some Schumann warped beyond recognition etc. in there. "Funebre" is largely based on one single bar off Wagner and we have that little Chopin signature thrown in there as well. So yeah, even though we use fewer notes, the classical stamp is all over the record. Beach Boys? It's probably the vocal thing, that I am fond of clean-sung, layered, well-produced vocals and harmonies. That's another rarity these days. I wonder, where did all the sunshine pop go?”

In an interview with Pitchfork Media, Rygg commented on the collaboration with Christian Fennesz: “He remixed a song off Perdition City. I wanted Christian to leave his signature on this album simply because I love his stuff, and he has a similar story to ours. He's not at home in his own genre. That "harsh" noise stuff does not appeal to me at all. It lacks the fingerspitzengefühl that turn songs like Christian's "Chateau Rouge" or "A Year in a Minute" into something special. He makes white noise sound like sunlight dappling in the Mediterranean.”

== Critical reception ==
Professional ratings
Review scores
Source	Rating
AllMusic	3.5/5 stars
Sputnikmusic	4/5 stars
Blabbermouth	8.5/10

Upon release, Shadows of the Sun received generally positive reviews from music critics.

William York, writing for AllMusic, commented, “Shadows of the Sun offers a new slant on the sort of electronic art pop sound that Ulver have been developing off and on since 1999's Metamorphosis EP. Along with 2005's return-to-form Blood Inside, it is one of their stronger efforts this decade, following several years of experimentation with instrumental electronic music. They have developed a unique, quickly identifiable sound during that time, and this album is a nice variation on that signature sound.”

SputnikMusic rated the album 4 out of 5, commenting, “Ulver have taken a decidedly more subtle approach to songwriting and the mood they’re attempting to create, but what a mood it is. The feeling that you get while listening to this album could best be summed up by the word “serenity”. Granted, it is a somber form of serenity, but the word still fits perfectly.” Adding, “If there are any problems that some may have with this new album it is going to be the same thing that is going to make others love this album, and that is its subtlety. Whereas on Blood Inside and Perdition City the albums commanded your attention due to their frequent shift from soft to loud sections and their regular use of discordant sounds, Shadows of the Sun will easily fade away from your attention if you don’t give it the awareness it deserves.”

Roadrunner Records affiliate website Blabbermouth.net rated the album 8.5 out of 10, commenting, “Shadows of the Sun begins sombrely and remains so throughout, employing more subtle coloration and impeccable placement of impacting (but still low-key) rhythms. It is the magic that Ulver creates on Shadows of the Sun that seeps through the pores and drowns the soul in melancholic grace. It is why the act stands alone.”

== Track listing ==
All tracks are written by Ulver, except where noted.

No.	Title	Writer(s)	Length
1.	"Eos"		5:05
2.	"All the Love"		3:42
3.	"Like Music"		3:30
4.	"Vigil"		4:27
5.	"Shadows of the Sun"		4:36
6.	"Let the Children Go"		3:50
7.	"Solitude" (Black Sabbath cover)	Butler, Iommi, Osbourne, Ward	3:53
8.	"Funebre"		4:26
9.	"What Happened?"		6:25
Total length:			39:58

== Personnel ==
Ulver

- Kristoffer Rygg
- Tore Ylwizaker
- Jørn H. Sværen

Oslo Session String Quartet

- Hans Josef Groh – cello, solo on track 3
- Dorthe Dreier – viola
- André Orvik – violin
- Vegard Johnsen – violin on tracks 1, 4 and 9

Additional Musicians

- Mathias Eick – trumpet on tracks 2, 6 and 7
- Christian Fennesz – supplemental shimmer on track 4
- Espen Jørgensen – acoustic guitar on track 4 and electric guitar on tracks 3 and 7
- Pamelia Kurstin – theremin on tracks 1 and 8

Other Credits

- Audun Strype – mastering
- Trine Paulsen – cover and artwork
- Kim Sølve – cover and artwork
- David D'Andrea – LP cover artwork
- "Solitude" is written by Ozzy Osbourne, Tony Iommi, Geezer Butler, and Bill Ward
