= ATGCLVLSSCAP =

Studio album by Ulver
- Released: 22 January 2016
- Recorded: February 2014
- Studio: Subsonic Society, Oslo, Norway; Oak Hill Studios, Oslo, Norway
- Genre: Experimental rock; post-rock; electronic; ambient
- Length: 80:05
- Label: House of Mythology
- Producer: Ulver

Ulver chronology
Terrestrials (2014)	ATGCLVLSSCAP (2016)	Riverhead (2016)

Ulver studio album chronology
Terrestrials (2014)	ATGCLVLSSCAP (2016)	The Assassination of Julius Caesar (2017)

ATGCLVLSSCAP is the tenth studio album by Norwegian experimental electronica band Ulver. Written, performed and produced by Ulver, the album was released on 22 January 2016 via newly formed, London-based label House of Mythology.

The music was culled from multitrack recordings made at twelve different improvisatory "free rock" live shows the band performed in February 2014, and later edited and enhanced in the studio by Daniel O'Sullivan. The album has been described as "Ultimately a piece of work that exists above and beyond any conventional live recording, rather a hallucinatory travelogue as potent an experience to bear witness to as it was to construct."

On 30 October 2015 the song "Cromagnosis" was broadcast on Baba Yaga's Hut via online radio station Resonance FM, and later uploaded to Mixcloud.

The song "Moody Stix" features samples from the song "Doom Sticks" from A Quick Fix of Melancholy. "Glammer Hammer" reinterprets "Glamour Box (Ostinati)" from Messe I.X–VI.X. "Nowhere (Sweet Sixteen)" is a new arrangement of "Nowhere/Catastrophe", and "Ecclesiastes (A Vernal Catnap)" reinterprets the ending of "Tomorrow Never Knows"; both original songs are from Perdition City. "England's Hidden" contains vocal samples of "England" from Wars of the Roses.

The album's title, ATGCLVLSSCAP, is an initialism referring to the first letter of each twelve signs of the zodiac, from Aries to Pisces.

== Background ==
On 2 January 2014 Ulver announced an 11-date European tour: "the February dates will consist of partly new and improv-based material, likely to revolve around motifs already familiar to our familiars. We had a good experience doing just that (improv) in Oslo in August, so a more free-ranging form is what we are aiming for this time. We are looking forward to get out there, and hope for some interesting music to be born those evenings and nights. We also aim to document some of it for those of you who cannot come." Kristoffer Rygg added, "The tour was to be an experiment, kind of loose and scary for a band as 'set in their ways' as us... It is partly borne out of that feeling, being a bit bored with the circumstances. It was quite liberating to do something more in the moment. One night a jam could be five minutes, and the next it could be fifteen. We couldn’t have captured these songs in a studio environment."

On 3 June 2015, on the band’s official website, in a statement titled "Only Theatre of Pain", Ulver announced Daniel O'Sullivan, working under the moniker "12", had taken the multitrack recordings and begun sculpting and editing hours of material in his North London home, before Anders Møller, Kristoffer Rygg and Tore Ylwizaker got involved, completing the recordings at Subsonic Society and Oak Hill Studios, Oslo.

== 2014 tour itinerary ==
ATGCLVLSSCAP was recorded on the following dates:

- 07/08/13 – Blå - Oslo, Norway
- 01/02/14 – Savoy Teatteri, Helsinki, Finland
- 05/02/14 – B90, Gdansk, Poland
- 06/02/14 – Lido, Berlin, Germany
- 07/02/14 – Akropolis, Praha, Czech Republic
- 09/02/14 – Dynamo Grosser Saal, Zurich, Switzerland
- 10/02/14 – Szene, Wien, Austria
- 11/02/14 – Backstage, Munich, Germany
- 12/02/14 – Werkstatt, Koln, Germany
- 13/02/14 – 013, Tilburg, Netherlands
- 15/02/14 – Bloom Mezzago, Milano, Italy
- 16/02/14 – Circolo Degli Artisti, Roma, Italy
- 26/04/14 – Club Volta, Moscow, Russia

== Critical reception ==
Professional ratings
Aggregate scores
Source	Rating
Metacritic	70/100
Review scores
Source	Rating
Aftenposten	6/6 stars
Drowned in Sound	8/10 stars
Kerrang!	2/5 stars
Louder Than War	10/10 stars
MusicOMH	4.5/5 stars
Metal Hammer	8/10 stars
PopMatters	8/10 stars
Pitchfork	6.5/10
Sputnikmusic	4.1/5
Uncut	8/10 stars

At Metacritic, which assigns a normalised rating out of 100 to reviews from mainstream critics, ATGCLVLSSCAP has an average score of 70 based on 8 reviews, indicating "generally favorable reviews".

The Quietus wrote, "Ulver have clearly perfected the art of musical metamorphosis, yet they opt to balance all of their previous learnings on ATGCLVLSSCAP. Traces of so much lie therein, and each of the twelve tracks gives more with every listen, revealing new depths and fresh signposts to previous musics. ATGCLVLSSCAP is surely the most fully realised album they'll ever release." Dom Lawson of Metal Hammer praised the album, adding, "Ulver continue to transform themselves at will and the results are thrillingly unpredictable but predictably thrilling."

Writing for musicOMH, Sam Shepherd concludes, "ATGCLVLSSCAP is an album that explores the cosmos through a series of dichotomies. It is instinctive but planned, primal but enlightened, and hazy but focused. The only sure thing about it is that it is Ulver's finest work to date." Benjamin Bland from Drowned in Sound said, "In a not dissimilar fashion to 2014's collaboration with Sunn O))), ATGCLVLSSCAP unhurriedly glides through its run time (a breezy seventy-nine minutes) without ever feeling ponderous. Building up so many layers of gorgeous sound over its initial hour that its transformation into more traditional song craft near its conclusion feels more like the beginning than the end. Despite its hefty length, then, ATGCLVLSSCAP works as a triumphant departure from the confines of the temporal."

Jedd Beaudoin of PopMatters said, "Ulver creates its own world with this album, exists on its own terms and asks us to consider embracing something that is outside the norm but well within the human experience and worth the journey of transformation it takes us on. Ulver has once more created a record that will live far beyond this time and will be spoken of in the most reverent of tones and that’s as it should be." John Robb from Louder Than War described the albums as "an aural adventure to get lost in. A droning dark masterpiece of groundbreaking music that slithers out of dull and boring stuff like categories. 23 years in and the band are on the verge of becoming a major force. ATGCLVLSSCAP is their statement. It's diverse, multi faceted and beautifully dark. It's the soundtrack to a film that only exists in your head. It is grand, thrilling and darkly restless. It has a beauty and danger and is utterly compelling."

Paul Travers from Kerrang! was much more critical, saying, "There are some nice hypnotic grooves, but this smells mostly of self-indulgence. Worse, it’s boring as hell, proving even geniuses can misstep."

== Track listing ==
No.	Title	Length
1.	"England's Hidden"	7:43
2.	"Glammer Hammer"	4:49
3.	"Moody Stix"	6:42
4.	"Cromagnosis"	9:48
5.	"The Spirits That Lend Strength Are Invisible"	3:16
6.	"Om Hanumate Namah"	7:42
7.	"Desert/Dawn"	8:27
8.	"D-Day Drone"	9:22
9.	"Gold Beach"	4:58
10.	"Nowhere (Sweet Sixteen)"	5:57
11.	"Ecclesiastes (A Vernal Catnap)"	9:02
12.	"Solaris"	2:18
Total length:		80:05

== Personnel ==
On stage

- Seth Beaudreault — audiovisuals
- Ole Alexander Halstensgård — electronics
- Anders Møller — percussion
- Daniel O'Sullivan — bass, guitar
- Kristoffer Rygg — electronics, percussion, voice
- Jørn H. Sværen — voice
- Ivar Thormodsæter — drums
- Tore Ylvisaker — keys, electronics

Behind the scenes

- Ralph Blagau — driver 1, stagehand
- Chris Fullard — FOH, tour manager
- Mark Lewis — tour booking
- Aleš Meduna — driver 2, merchandise mind
- Mastered By Jaime Gomez Arellano, Orgone Studios, London
- Cut for vinyl by Tor Harald Degerstrøm, THD Vinyl Mastering, Oslo
- Design and layout by Paschalis Zervas, + wolframgrafik, Athens

== Charts ==
Chart (2016)	Peak position
Finnish Albums (Suomen virallinen lista)	45
