= Kristoffer Rygg =

Norwegian vocalist, musician, and record producer (born 1976)

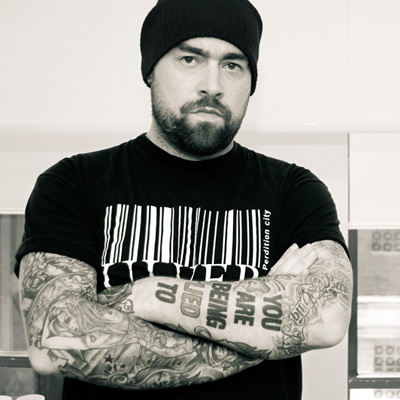
- Rygg in 2007

Background information
- Also known as: Garm, Fiery G. Maelstrom, G. Wolf, Trickster G. Rex, Christophorus G. Rygg, God Head
- Born: Kristoffer Rygg; 9 September 1976 (age 50); Oslo, Norway
- Genres: Electronic; heavy metal; avant-garde; ambient
- Occupations: Musician, composer, record producer, audio engineer
- Instruments: Vocals, keyboards, programming
- Years active: 1992–present
- Labels: Jester, The End
- Member of: Ulver
- Formerly of: Borknagar; Arcturus

Kristoffer Rygg (born 9 September 1976), also known as Garm, Trickster G. Rex and God Head, is a Norwegian vocalist, musician and producer known primarily for his work with Ulver, Arcturus, and Borknagar.

== Biography ==
Kristoffer Rygg was born in Oslo, Norway and later raised in Cascais, Portugal. He formed the band Ulver at age 16. Initially a black metal band, they became better known as an experimental electronic music group. Through his work with Ulver, Rygg would go on to become an important part of later metal subcategories, including avant-garde metal. Rygg is also the former vocalist of Borknagar (1995–1997) and Arcturus (1993–2003), both of which comprise central musicians from the early Norwegian black metal scene. Upon resigning from Borknagar, he recommended ICS Vortex as his replacement.

Rygg possesses a wide range of vocal textures and styles, ranging from baritone, countertenor, crooning and even black metal style screaming. He often records multiple tracks of himself to create dense male choirs on albums such as the majority of the vocals on Kveldssanger.

In 2005, Rygg collaborated with Portuguese musician/producer Daniel Cardoso in the project Head Control System. The music was described by the label as "groovy rock/metal with progressive edges and cinematic components". Their first and only full-length, entitled Murder Nature, was released on 4 April 2006 through The End Records.

In recent years Rygg has been involved in freeform/improvisational project Æthenor which includes notable musicians such as Stephen O'Malley of Sunn O))), Daniel O'Sullivan of Guapo and David Tibet of Current 93. In April 2008 he played five concerts with Æthenor. It was his first time on stage in over a decade. Rygg has since participated in several mini-tours and concerts with Æthenor. Their triple residency at the Oslo jazz club Blå resulted in the much-acclaimed 4th album En Form for Blå.

In 2009, fifteen years after their only concert back in 1993, he decided to reintroduce Ulver live in concert. The first show was hosted by the Lillehammer Norwegian Literature Festival Norwegian Festival of Literature, and initiated by the late author Stig Sæterbakken. A year later, and after a series of shows around Europe, Rygg stood in front of a full house at the main stage of Oslo's National Opera & Ballet. A video album from the event was released commercially, and includes liner notes by Rygg and Sæterbakken.

Rygg owns and operates Jester Records, an underground label specializing in experimental music, including Ulver, which has since their early metal days metamorphosed into a musical composite difficult to categorize. He has acted as guest vocalist, lyricist, engineer, producer, and remixer for a large list of artists, including Alkaline Trio, Mindless Self Indulgence, Genghis Tron, Darkthrone, Mayhem, Emperor, Ihsahn, Dimmu Borgir, The Gathering, Merzbow, Carpenter Brut and Sunn O))).

== Discography ==
=== With Arcturus ===
- Constellation (1994)
- Aspera Hiems Symfonia (1995)
- La Masquerade Infernale (1997)
- Disguised Masters (1999)
- Aspera Hiems Symfonia/Constellation/My Angel (2002)
- The Sham Mirrors (2002)

=== With Borknagar ===
- Borknagar (1996)
- The Olden Domain (1997)
- Winter Thrice (2016) (Appears as a guest vocalist)

=== With Head Control System ===
- Murder Nature (2006)

=== With Ulver ===
- Vargnatt (1993)
- Split 7" w/Mysticum (1994)
- Bergtatt - Et Eeventyr i 5 Capitler (1995)
- Kveldssanger (1996)
- Nattens Madrigal - Aatte Hymne til Ulven i Manden (1997)
- Themes from William Blake's The Marriage of Heaven and Hell (1998)
- Metamorphosis (1999)
- Perdition City (2000)
- Silence Teaches You How to Sing (2001)
- Silencing the Singing (2001)
- Lyckantropen Themes (2002)
- A Quick Fix of Melancholy (2003)
- Teachings in Silence (2003)
- Svidd Neger (soundtrack) (2003)
- 1993–2003: 1st Decade in the Machines (2003) (remix album)
- UNO (soundtrack) (2005)
- Blood Inside (2005)
- Shadows of the Sun (2007)
- Wars of the Roses (2011)
- Childhood's End (2012)
- Live at Roadburn – Eulogy for the Late Sixties (2013)
- Messe I.X-VI.X (2013)
- ATGCLVLSSCAP (2015)
- Riverhead (soundtrack) (2016)
- The Assassination of Julius Caesar (2017)
- Flowers of Evil (2020)
- Scary Muzak (2021)
- Liminal Animals (2024)
- Neverland (2025)

=== With Æthenor ===
- Betimes Black Cloudmasses (2008)
- En Form for Blå (2010)
- Hazel (2016)

=== As guest musician/producer/etc. ===
- Darkthrone: Wrote the lyric Earth's Last Picture for the Total Death album (1995).
- Gehenna: Features Rygg on Vinterriket off the Seen Through The Veils of Darkness album (1995).
- Aura Noir: Handwriting on the backcover for the Dreams Like Deserts MCD (1995). He also engineered/produced the album Deep Tracts of Hell (1998).
- Dødheimsgard aka DHG: Mastered the Monumental Possession album (1996), he was also involved in the mastering of the Satanic Art MCD (1998).
- Forlorn: Mastered the Forlorn EP (1996) and The Crystal Palace debut album (1996).
- Old Man's Child: Mastered the Born of the Flickering album (1996).
- Aphrodisiac: Contributed with the track Children, it is I on the Nonsense Chamber album (1997).
- De Press: Features Rygg on the track Orawski Psalm of the Potargano Chałpa album (1997).
- Emperor: Ulver did a remix of the track Sworn (1999). Rygg also mastered the album Anthems to the Welkin at Dusk (1997).
- Mayhem: Produced, mixed and mastered the Wolf's Lair Abyss MCD (1997). Featured on the first track of Liturgy of Death (2025).
- Hagalaz Runedance: Ulver did a remix of the track The Falcon Flies off the Urd: That which was MCD (1999).
- Fleurety: Features Rygg on Last Minute Lies off the Department of Apocalyptic Affairs album (2000). He also engineered and co-produced said album.
- SCN: Features Rygg on Rise Above off the Inside Out album (2001).
- Zyklon: Features Rygg on the two tracks Chaos Deathcult and Transcendental War – Battle between Gods of the World ov Worms album (2001).
- Kåre João: Rygg does backing vocals on the Sideman album (2002).
- Magenta: Features Rygg on the two tracks Vandalistvirgin and Backstabber Nation on the All Over single (2002). Rygg is also featured on the tracks I need my Love, Vandalistvirgin and Mermaid off the Little Girl Lost album (2003).
- Star of Ash: Features Rygg on the two tracks The Nudity of Light and In the Throws of Guilt off the Iter.Viator album (2002) which he also co-produced. He is also featured on the songs Blood, Bones and a Skull and Crossing Over off the album The Thread (2008).
- 1349 Rykkinn: Unspecified appearance on the Brown Ring of Fury album (2003).
- Merzbow: Ulver did a remix of Denki No Numa for the Frog: Remixed and Revisited album (2003).
- The Gathering: Rygg sings a duet with Anneke van Giersbergen on A Life all Mine off the Souvenirs album (2003).
- Virus: Rygg is credited with "Backyard barks" on the song Queen of the Hi-Ace off the Carheart album (2003) and provided guest vocals on the song "Call of the Tuskers" off the album "The Agents That Shape The Desert" (2011).
- Tuner: Rygg appears with a 'single growl' on the first track White Cake Sky on the Pole album (2007), recorded in US (2005–2006).
- Ihsahn: Rygg sings Homecoming off The Adversary (2006).
- Solefald: Rygg plays the role of Loki on the song Loki Trickster God from the (2006) album Black For Death: An Icelandic Odyssey Part 2.
- Sunn O))): Ulver provided production and contributions to the track CUT WOODeD on WHITEbox (2006).
- Professor Fate: For the album Inferno (2007), Rygg performed vocals on the track "Limbo."
- V:28: Features Rygg on the track The Absolute off the Violution album (2007).
- Alkaline Trio: Ulver contributes with string arrangements and samples on the album Agony and Irony (2008).
- Ava Inferi's third album Blood of Bacchus contains guest vocals by Garm on the track Black Wings (2009).
- Dimmu Borgir's Abrahadabra (2010): Rygg sings clean vocals on the last track "Endings and Continuations".
- Zweizz & Joey Hopkins: Zweizz & Joey Hopkins (2011): Vocals on the track "The Goat".
- Mothlite: Dark Age (2012): Vocals on the track "The Underneath".
- Nidingr – Garm sings vocals on the end of "Baldrs Draumar" on the album "Wolf Father" and clean vocals on "Ash Yggdrasil" on the album "The High Heat Licks Against Heaven".
- Myrkur: M (2015): Production, mixing
- Thomas Giles' single Milan (2018)

=== With Carpenter Brut ===
- Leather Teeth (2018)
- Leather Terror (2022)

== Filmography ==
- Until the Light Takes Us by Aaron Aites and Audrey Ewell : himself
