= Riverhead (soundtrack) =

Soundtrack album by Ulver
- Released: 9 December 2016
- Recorded: June–July 2016
- Studio: Oak Hill studios, Oslo
- Genre: Experimental music, drone, dark ambient
- Length: 42:13
- Label: House of Mythology
- Producer: Ulver

Ulver chronology
| ATGCLVLSSCAP (2016) | Riverhead (2016) | The Assassination of Julius Caesar (2017) |

Riverhead is an original motion picture soundtrack album by Norwegian experimental collective Ulver for Justin Oakey's 2016 film of the same name. The album was issued in December 2016 via House of Mythology.

The music was composed by Ulver, this time consisting of Ole-Henrik Moe, Kristoffer Rygg, Kari Rønnekleiv, Jørn H. Sværen, and Tore Ylwizaker and recorded, edited, and mixed by Kristoffer Rygg and Tore Ylwizaker at Oak Hill studios, Oslo, between June–July 2016. The final recordings were mastered by Jaime Gomez Arellano at Orgone, London, in September 2016. The soundtrack has been described as "sparse and minimal as ever, but with a gentle drive to its arc."

== Background ==
Justin Oakey is a filmmaker from Newfoundland who had previously collaborated with Ulver.

Writing about the soundtrack, Oakey says:

Late last fall I sent Kristoffer Rygg my latest short film, FLANKERS, and we began chatting about the soundtrack, eventually going back and forth about a potential collaboration. At this point, I went out on a limb and asked if ULVER would be interested in composing the music for my upcoming feature, RIVERHEAD. They kindly accepted and here is the result. As a long-time fan, this was an incredible collaboration for me – and further, it allowed us to find aesthetic and cultural similarities between our lands. With this in mind, the soundtrack certainly touches on Nordic and Celtic folk music from within an ambient/atmospheric frame. There was a mutual understanding that the soundtrack should be hushed, airy and ominous, almost elemental in its minimalism, with only a few key moments that rupture into larger, more augmented pieces. As far as the method, ULVER started by recording and sending over some sketches and atmospheres before we shot a single scene of the film. This allowed me to go into the filming with an understanding of the soundtrack, and how the scenes could (and would) be paced – truly an invaluable asset, especially with a fragmented film like this. Afterwards, they continued to record and we fine-tuned said sketches as well as some new pieces together. Ultimately, I am as proud of this collaboration as a standalone project as I am with the film itself.

== Critical reception ==
Professional ratings
Review scores
| Source | Rating |
|---|---|
| Prog | Favourable |
| The Wire | Favourable |

Alex Lynham, writing for Prog magazine, says "their electronic and ambient influences shine strongly, and lend themselves well to the cinematic atmosphere, but perhaps less obviously where there are organic instruments there remains a strong folk influence." Lynham concludes, "As a soundtrack album, it's entirely possible that only hardcore fans of Ulver will find it essential; however, for those interested in the band beyond their early mercurial folk and black metal records, this is an interesting and captivating document of their electronic and cinematic work."

The Wire magazine's review in their February 2017 issue explains, "The film deals with poisonous rivalry existing between two hierarchical neighbours over family and religion. It's bleak and minimalist in its telling, and Ulver's score accompanies the mood of the story perfectly, with sawing strings and frozen musical passages giving a sense of immediate danger as the plot unravels. Also impressive is the way the music entwines round the film's snowy landscape, soughing through the trees like an ill wind to add an extra chill to the proceedings."

== Track listing ==
All music is composed by Ulver.

| No. | Title | Length |
|---|---|---|
| 1. | "Riverhead" | 5:13 |
| 2. | "Dark Alley" | 1:34 |
| 3. | "Road to Town" | 2:26 |
| 4. | "In a Wooden Coat" | 3:08 |
| 5. | "Idle Hands Are the Devil's Playthings" | 2:54 |
| 6. | "Father's Feud" | 3:11 |
| 7. | "In Memoriam" | 3:00 |
| 8. | "Stoke the Fire" | 2:44 |
| 9. | "Bored of Canada" | 3:30 |
| 10. | "Hard Standing" | 1:55 |
| 11. | "Stalking" | 1:31 |
| 12. | "A Waste of Your Father's Life" | 2:09 |
| 13. | "Spiteful Things" | 3:00 |
| 14. | "The Hunt" | 1:51 |
| 15. | "Snake in the Grass" | 4:07 |
| Total length: | | 42:13 |

== Personnel ==
Ulver

- Kristoffer Rygg – synth Pads, pedalboard, percussion
- Jørn H. Sværen – wind
- Tore Ylwizaker – keyboards, electronics

Additional musicians

- Ole-Henrik Moe – hardingfele, fiddle, violin, viola, cello
- Kari Rønnekleiv – hardingfele, violin

Production and design

- + wolframgrafik – design, layout
- KR – lacquer cut
- Justin Oakey – sleeve notes (L'Anse Aux Meadows, September 2016)
- Jaime Gomez Arellano – mastering
- Kristoffer Rygg- recording, editing, mixing
- Tore Ylwizaker – recording, editing, mixing
