= Svidd neger (soundtrack) =

Soundtrack album by Ulver
- Released: 15 September 2003
- Genre: Electronic, ambient music, neoclassical, trip hop
- Length: 32:36
- Label: Jester

Ulver chronology
A Quick Fix of Melancholy (2003)	Svidd neger (2003)	Blood Inside (2005)

Svidd neger (subtitled Original Motion Picture Soundtrack) is an original soundtrack album by Norwegian experimental collective Ulver. The soundtrack was commissioned by Filmfalken AS. from Ambassaden, Oslo, and Norsk Film, Bærum, Norway, recorded between September 2002 and April 2003. The album was issued by Jester Records on 15 September 2003. The music is more elaborate than the abstract minimalism of Lyckantropen Themes. Stated on the sleeve: “Music for and Inspired by Svidd neger as perceived by Ulver. What you hear is not strictly what you see. All for the director in you.”

Svidd neger is Ulver’s first score for a full-length feature film, the controversial Norwegian film Svidd neger. The songs are lush and dense, generally laidback but sinister, at times more musical and orchestral, while other elements are more minimal and atmospheric.

== Critical reception ==
Professional ratings
Review scores
Source	Rating
Sputnikmusic	link

Writing for Sputnikmusic, Tyler Munro, rated the soundtrack 4.5/5, commenting, “Very few albums craft themselves as experiences. Crafted as the soundtrack to the Norwegian film of the same name, Svidd Neger is ultimately nothing more than that. The movie is filled with racial epithets, axe-murders, alcoholic servants of god and some hardcore farming action, it's quite surprising to say that the soundtrack is absolutely beautiful.”

John Chedsey, writing for webzine Satan Stole My Teddybear, comments, “Ulver sheds the constant sense of anxiety of Perdition City for an experience that is far more subliminal and alluring. The CD is a stripped down and minimalized affair that accents the mood and atmosphere of the music over any sort of song based musical score. The music is often very contemplative and looks inwards. The album doesn't quite conform to the noir imagery of Perdition City or the weirdness of A Quick Fix of Melancholy, but the overall feel of the album still thoroughly identifies the music as Ulver's own.”

== Track listing ==
No.	Title	Length
1.	"Preface"	1:41
2.	"Ante Andante"	0:53
3.	"Comedown"	2:18
4.	"Surface"	3:17
5.	"Somnam"	2:41
6.	"Wild Cat"	2:32
7.	"Rock Massif Pt. 1"	1:41
8.	"Rock Massif Pt. 2"	2:05
9.	"Poltermagda"	0:27
10.	"Mummy"	1:02
11.	"Burn the Bitch"	0:52
12.	"Sick Soliloquy"	0:21
13.	"Waltz of King Karl"	3:17
14.	"Sadface"	2:43
15.	"Fuck Fast"	0:20
16.	"Wheel of Conclusion"	6:26

== Personnel ==
Ulver

- Trickster G. Rex
- Tore Ylwizaker
- Jørn H. Sværen
