= The Assassination of Julius Caesar (album) =

Studio album by Ulver
- Released: 7 April 2017
- Recorded: 2016–2017
- Studios: Subsonic Society, Oslo, Norway
- Genres: Synthpop, new wave, electronic dance music, art pop
- Length: 43:39
- Label: House of Mythology
- Producer: Ulver

Ulver chronology
Riverhead (2016)	The Assassination of Julius Caesar (2017)	Sic Transit Gloria Mundi (2017)

Ulver studio album chronology
ATGCLVLSSCAP (2016)	The Assassination of Julius Caesar (2017)	Flowers of Evil (2020)

Professional ratings
Aggregate scores
Source	Rating
Metacritic	82/100
Review scores
Source	Rating
Allmusic	4/5 stars
The Independent	4/5 stars
The Quietus	(favorable)
Spin	(favorable)
Sputnikmusic	4.3/5

The Assassination of Julius Caesar is the eleventh studio album by Norwegian electronic band Ulver, released on 7 April 2017 via London-based label House of Mythology. The album was recorded and produced by Ulver in Oslo throughout summer 2016 and winter 2017 with mixing by Martin Glover and Michael Rendall in London, January 2017.

The cover artwork is a cropped photograph of The Rape of Proserpina (Italian: Ratto di Proserpina), a large Baroque marble sculptural group by Italian artist Gian Lorenzo Bernini, executed between 1621 and 1622. It depicts the abduction of Proserpina, who is seized and taken to the underworld by the god Pluto.

== Track listing ==
No.	Title	Length
1.	"Nemoralia"	4:10
2.	"Rolling Stone"	9:27
3.	"So Falls the World"	5:57
4.	"Southern Gothic"	3:40
5.	"Angelus Novus"	4:08
6.	"Transverberation"	4:31
7.	"1969"	4:00
8.	"Coming Home"	7:50
Total length:		43:39

== Personnel ==
Ulver

- Kristoffer Rygg – vocals, additional programming
- Tore Ylvisaker – keyboards, programming
- Ole Alexander Halstensgård – electronics
- Jørn H. Sværen – miscellaneous

Additional musicians

- Håvard Jørgensen – guitar (track 7)
- Anders Møller – percussion
- Rikke Normann – vocals (track 2)
- Daniel O'Sullivan – guitar (tracks 4 and 6)
- Dag Stiberg – saxophone (track 8)
- Sisi Sumbundu – vocals (tracks 2 and 7)
- Ivar Thormodsæter – drums
- Nik Turner – saxophone (track 2)
- Stian Westerhus – guitar (tracks 1 and 2)
