= Head Control System =

Rock/metal band

- Origin: Portugal and Norway
- Genres: Alternative metal
- Years active: 2003–present
- Labels: The End Records; V.M.E.
- Members: Daniel Cardoso; Kristoffer Rygg

Head Control System is a cross-national rock/metal band featuring portuguese Daniel Cardoso (ex-Anathema, ex-Sirius and ex-Re:aktor) and Norwegian Kristoffer Rygg (of Ulver and ex-Arcturus and ex-Borknagar). Head Control System is currently part of North-American The End Records' roster along with bands such as Voivod, The Gathering, Sleepytime Gorilla Museum and Ulver. The band's debut album, Murder Nature, was released on April 4, 2006.

== Concept ==
=== Lyrical ===
Initially, the band was named SinDRomE. Its first release was the EP "Severe Damage on Reason and Equilibrium" — the acronym identical to the capital letters of the band logo. While Daniel himself never wrote a single lyric, he did, however, implement his ideas for the EP in collaboration with André Vasconcelos, a friend and writer. Daniel performed and recorded all of the instrumentation for the EP.

Upon Kristoffer's joining of the band, Daniel and Kris agreed to change the name of the band to Head Control System. The lyrics on Murder Nature were influenced by Kris's fascination with automatic writing, in a stream of conscious style. They also contain many wordplays and references to politics, film, literature, among many other things.

=== Musical ===
Being influenced by the likes of Meshuggah and the work of Fredrik Thordendal himself, Daniel Cardoso uses rhythms and cycles in a melodic style of rock, bearing some resemblance to Tool, Faith No More or A Perfect Circle. The music also includes subtle, repeating, dissonant cycles in the background.

== Discography ==
- Severe Damage on Reason and Equilibrium (as SinDRomE) - 2003, EP, Ins@ne Prod.
- Murder Nature - 2006, full-length, The End Records (U.S.)/ V.M.E. (Europe)

== Line-Up ==
- Daniel Cardoso : Music, Production
- Kristoffer Rygg : Vocals, Lyrics
