= Flowers of Evil (Ulver album) =

Studio album by Ulver
- Released: August 28, 2020
- Recorded: 2019–2020
- Studio: Subsonic Society, Oslo, Norway
- Genre: Synth-pop, art rock
- Length: 37:52
- Label: House of Mythology
- Producer: Ulver

Ulver chronology
Drone Activity (2018)	Flowers of Evil (2020)	Scary Muzak (2021)

Ulver studio album chronology
The Assassination of Julius Caesar (2017)	Flowers of Evil (2020)	Scary Muzak (2021)

Professional ratings
Aggregate scores
Source	Rating
Metacritic	72/100
Review scores
Source	Rating
AllMusic	4/5 stars
Exclaim!	7/10
Kerrang!	3/5
musicOMH	3.5/5 stars

Flowers of Evil is the twelfth studio album by Norwegian experimental electronica band Ulver. Written and produced by Ulver, the album was released on August 28, 2020, via House of Mythology. The album was recorded in Oslo from summer 2019 to winter 2020 and mixed by Martin Glover and Michael Rendall in February 2020. The album was officially announced in February 2020 with music video of the song "Russian Doll" being released on Valentine's Day. The second single "Little Boy" was made available on April 4, 2020.

The album cover features a still image of actress Renée Jeanne Falconetti having her head shaved during her performance in the title role of Carl Theodor Dreyer's La Passion de Jeanne d'Arc, a film released in 1928.

== Track listing ==
No.	Title	Length
1.	"One Last Dance"	5:43
2.	"Russian Doll"	3:55
3.	"Machine Guns and Peacock Feathers"	3:54
4.	"Hour of the Wolf"	4:25
5.	"Apocalypse 1993"	4:31
6.	"Little Boy"	5:23
7.	"Nostalgia"	5:20
8.	"A Thousand Cuts"	4:41
Total length:		37:52

== Personnel ==
Ulver

- Kristoffer Rygg – vocals, additional programming
- Tore Ylvisaker – keyboards, programming
- Ole Alexander Halstensgård – electronics
- Jørn H. Sværen – miscellaneous

Additional musicians

- Ivar Thormodsæter – drums
- Anders Møller – percussion
- Christian Fennesz – guitar, electronics (track 1)
- Ole Henrik Moe – viola, cello (tracks 2, 6, 8)
- Kari Rønnekleiv – violin (tracks 2, 8)
- John Stark – bass (tracks 1, 8)
- Suzanne Sumbundu – vocals (tracks 3, 7)
- Mimmi Tamba – vocals (tracks 3, 7)
- Stian Westerhus – guitar (tracks 2–4, 6, 8)
- Michael J. York – bagpipes (track 6)

Production

- Ulver – recording, production
- Martin Glover, Michael Rendall – mixing
- Michael Lawrence – mastering
