= Drone Activity =

Live album by Ulver
- Released: May 11, 2019
- Genre: Electronic, drone
- Length: 1:13:32
- Label: House of Mythology
- Producer: Ulver

Drone Activity is the third live album from the experimental electronic band Ulver. It was released on May 11, 2019.

== Track listing ==
No.	Title	Length
1.	"True North"	16:11
2.	"Twenty Thousand Leagues Under the Sea"	21:48
3.	"Blood, Fire, Woods, Diamonds"	16:43
4.	"Exodus"	15:50
Total length:		1:13:32
