= Blood Inside =

Studio album by Ulver
- Released: June 6, 2005
- Recorded: January–February 2004
- Genres: Post-industrial; experimental rock; electronic rock
- Length: 45:45
- Label: Jester
- Producers: Ronan Chris Murphy; Ulver

Ulver chronology
Svidd neger (2003)	Blood Inside (2005)	Shadows of the Sun (2007)

Ulver studio album chronology
Perdition City (2000)	Blood Inside (2005)	Shadows of the Sun (2007)

Blood Inside is the sixth full-length studio album by Norwegian experimental electronica band Ulver. Produced by Ulver, together with Ronan Chris Murphy, the album was recorded and mixed in early 2004, and issued in June 2005 via Jester Records. The album sees Ulver return to more classically-based arrangements and instrumentation.

The coda on "It Is Not Sound" is based on Toccata and Fugue in D Minor by Bach. The lyrics for "Christmas" were adapted from the poem of the same name by Portuguese author Fernando Pessoa, written in 1922.

A video clip for "It Is Not Sound" was issued on May 2, 2005, via The End Records’ website, along with audio samples from Blood Inside.

== Background ==
Ulver's sound progresses here even more than on previous records. The music is influenced by several different genres such as rock, jazz, classical music, industrial music, and electronica.

The working title of the album was Utopian Enterprise, then changed to Heart, before the band settled on Blood Inside. Speaking about the evolution of the album, Kristoffer Rygg commented, "Utopian Enterprises is a title we all like and it goes back to Perdition City and some ideas stemming from that period, but as the lyrics took form it did not fit anymore. Then there was the Heart Album. Even we thought that was a bit pretentious. So Jørn and I are walking/talking outside one night trying to figure out what it is all about. Thinking only in key words: heart, blood, red, rose, beauty, violence, body, life, death, ambulance, hospital and so forth. Then it struck us: Blood Inside."

"In terms of genre, it is more rock than electronica. Even a bit psychedelic and/or progressive at times. The mood is kind of sanctified and sad. It has a few frivolous moments as well, but as they say, 'even in laughter the heart is sorrowful' (Proverbs 14:13.). I know there are many people who expect some kind of sequel to Perdition City. It's not. It's got a different kind of sensibility. It's also got far too much sound on it to be similar to our film soundtracks, which are quite often based on very simple and transparent kind of themes."

"[Blood Inside is] kind of counteracting the 'less is more' trip we've been on lately. Our last proper album Perdition City was so keen on being cinematic that it almost read as an application form to the film industry. While we did get into the film industry, our illusions of how fun and easy it would be to score motion pictures were downed pretty fast as soon as we got more acquainted with those people and their working methods. Now, having been a somewhat voiceless and underlying stratum in other people's visions for a while, we just felt like we had to put up a big fat wall of sound this time around."

"Blood Inside is not really that much of an electronic album, but it uses a lot of the technology we learned from our electronica phase. It showed us a different way to make records (while) still following different musical perspectives. They changed all of mine; it's not just true for me, it's true for most people. Blood Inside is like a monster kaleidoscope of illusions, very neatly arranged. As it seems now the next record is going to be without all that covering and more humble, with a more heartbreaking atmosphere; it's not going to be the same at all. We are kind of circular; it's reaction, anti-reaction, reaction, anti-reaction... it plays off each other; that's the way we work. As I said, we're not really good at perfecting a formula or sticking to what we know."

Rygg, commenting in Unrestrained magazine in 2007, also reflected, "That was a very anarchistic album. We revelled in the freedom of not having to play by anyone's rules, our own included. With the EPs and all the stuff we did before, we had rules. The Silence EPs had rules because they were all based on mishaps. That's the whole concept of glitch music. It has to be based on sounds that aren't intended, in a sense. We also had rules laid out for the soundtracks, naturally, so Blood Inside got a little out of control. We just went all over the whole spectrum. I think it's a solid record but it's very different from what we've done now. I think we made some good music. I think the track "Christmas", for instance, and "Your Call" are good tracks. "Your Call" was, by the way, a song that influenced this new record [Shadows of the Sun]. It set off the musical tone for this record."

== Critical reception ==
Professional ratings
Review scores
Source	Rating
AllMusic	link
Dusted	link
Stylus	D- link
Scene Point Blank	link
Chronicles of Chaos	link

Scene Point Blank described Blood Inside as "a beautifully crafted album of both substance and style. Certainly, Blood Inside is still not for everyone, but those who choose to indulge in this will find themselves rewarded on every level."

SputnikMusic commented, "[Blood Inside] is ambiguous and full of intricate layers and influences working to tell a story that is both haunting and mesmerising. Garm’s beautiful distorted vocals act as outcries of a desperate man hidden, pushed in the background of the story that the instrumentation tells."

Webzine Avantgarde-metal.com concluded: "the sound of the album is maybe their most extravagant, extrovert, dynamic and wild, ranging from swing band to danceable hard electronic pop, with a lot of peaceful moments in between so much energy."

Eduardo Rivadavia, writing for AllMusic, commented, "The Norwegians' first non-soundtrack release in many a year also brings about some notable changes. Foremost among them being the decision to abandon some of the stark minimalism that characterized those efforts, so that by comparison, the predominantly synthesizer-wrought compositions on hand here sound positively sumptuous." Concluding, "As one has come to expect from Ulver, the total end result is unfailing eclectic, remarkably inspiring, and never less than a brave step into the depths of the unknown."

== Track listing ==
No.	Title	Length
1.	"Dressed in Black"	7:06
2.	"For the Love of God"	4:11
3.	"Christmas"	6:15
4.	"Blinded by Blood"	6:22
5.	"It Is Not Sound"	4:37
6.	"The Truth"	4:01
7.	"In the Red"	3:30
8.	"Your Call"	6:07
9.	"Operator"	3:36
Total length:		45:45

== Personnel ==
Ulver

- Kristoffer Rygg (credited as "Trickster G.") - vocals, electronic programming
- Tore Ylwizaker - electronic programming
- Jørn H. Sværen - electronic programming

Additional Musicians

- Bosse – guitar solo on "For The Love Of God"
- Carl-Michael Eide (credited as "Czral") – drums on "Operator"
- Jeff Gauthier – violin on "Your Call"
- Håvard Jørgensen – guitar on "Dressed In Black", "For The Love Of God", and "Your Call"
- Mike Keneally – guitar on "Christmas", solo on "Operator"
- Andreas Mjos – vibraphone on "Blinded By Blood" and "In The Red"
- Maja Ratkje – choir on "Your Call"
- Knut Aalefjær – drums and percussion on "For The Love Of God", "Christmas", and "Operator"

Other Credits

- Trine Paulsen, Kim Sølve – cover art
- Ronan Chris Murphy – production
- Audun Strype – mastering

== Limited-edition release ==
A limited-edition CD (2000 copies) was released in a red velvet box containing a numbered cardboard sleeve. A limited vinyl version was released by Profound Lore Records. 1000 copies were made in six different colors:

- 100 transparent/red splatter
- 100 white/red splatter
- 100 red/black splatter
- 100 red/white two–sided
- 300 white
- 300 red
