= Lyckantropen Themes =

Soundtrack album by Ulver
- Released: 26 November 2002
- Genres: Experimental music, glitch, dark ambient
- Length: 36:23
- Label: Jester Records

Ulver chronology
Teachings in Silence (2002)	Lyckantropen Themes (2002)	1993–2003: 1st Decade in the Machines (2003)

Lyckantropen Themes (subtitled Original Soundtrack for the Short Film by Steve Ericsson) is an original soundtrack album by Norwegian experimental electronica band Ulver. Produced by Ulver on mobile equipment in Oslo, Norway and Stockholm, Sweden in May 2002 for the Swedish short film Lyckantropen, the album was issued in November 2002 via Jester Records. Lyckantropen Themes is Ulver's first foray into film soundtrack music, although musically it has continuity with their previously released EPs, Silence Teaches You How to Sing and Silencing the Singing. The soundtrack has been described as “ambiguous moods and lurking-in-the-shadows electronic ambiances, setting the alternately suspenseful and melancholy mood of the soundtrack.”

The soundtrack was nominated for a Spellemannprisen in 2002; an award presented to Norwegian musicians, in the 'Open Class' category.

The film's DVD release features an interview with Kristoffer Rygg and Jørn H. Sværen, entitled Shape Shifting - The 1st Decade of Ulver.

== Critical reception ==
Professional ratings
Review scores
Source	Rating
AllMusic	link

William York, writing for AllMusic, rated the album 3/5, concluding, "Taken on its own, Lyckantropen is a solid, respectable album of semi-dark ambient-electronic music, and at 37 minutes long, it doesn't wear out its welcome."

SputnikMusic rated the soundtrack 4/5, concluding, "[The soundtrack] can stand alone from the film and still procreate an impact. Ulver formidably accomplish this with apparent ease and grace, and also illustrate an unfamiliar way to approach arranging the soundtrack apart from the film. The best thing about Ulver is their ability to adapt. They can use any given situation or feeling and produce a whole record without overplaying or showboating, they just get their point across and finish in silence. When you watch the film and lose your mind in the soundtrack, that’s the best experience for you to begin to understand what the film is actually doing."

Rating the soundtrack 9/10, Alvin Wee, writing for webzine Chronicles of Chaos, writes "Ulver take yet another left turn on Lyckantropen Themes, this time exploring ambient soundscapes to a far greater extent than on their Perdition City sessions. Despite protestations to the contrary, Ulver's conversion to electronica did not result in them losing the darkness of their earlier albums; it is still present, albeit in a far more subtle manner. The songs segue seamlessly into one another, providing a sense of continuity and should ideally be listened to from beginning to end without interruption."

Webzine Deadline comments, "Lyckantropen Themes is really unlike anything the band has previously released. Moreover, it is probably unfair to treat this movie score as a new full-length Ulver album, as the thoughts and emotions were likely inspired by someone else's vision and guidance while Garm and Co. only made this vision come true."

Aversion Online rated the soundtrack 8/10, commenting, "Lyckantropen consists of 10 'themes' that are all improvisations based around the same three chords produced on mobile equipment. Like some of Ulver's recent work this material is very calm and rather minimal in its use of textures and tones, and obviously things are not as involved or dynamic as Perdition City or anything of that nature. As always Ulver never fails to impress the hell out of me. This is an excellent release that should not be missed by Ulver fanatics."

John Chedsey, writing for Satan Stole My Teddybear, comments, "Lyckantropen Themes is the outfit's full fledged descent into ambient soundscapes. Ulver sheds the constant sense of anxiety of Perdition City for an experience that is far more subliminal and alluring. Ulver seems to be getting more adept at this game and have more confidence in their ambient sensibilities. As one person described it, Lyckantropen Themes is background music that may fade to the rear but if you resume paying attention, there is always something going on to interest your ears. It is a very dark, but intriguing journey into musical ambience. Those who have been moved and impressed by Perdition City and its companion EPs will do well in picking this up. Within its idiom, Lyckantropen Themes is a successful and impressive venture."

Webzine Musique Machine wrote, "The cinematic approach of Ulver's last CD Perdition City and subsequent 2 EPs hasn't gone unnoticed and an actual soundtrack composed by them seemed to be a matter of time. Despite the unmistakably spooky chords the music has a soothing quality although there sure is an omnipresent impending doom during the full 36 minutes."

== Track listing ==
No.	Title	Alternate title	Length
1.	"Theme 1"	"NOFVJ0224010"	1:21
2.	"Theme 2"	"NOFVJ0224020"	1:37
3.	"Theme 3"	"NOFVJ0224030"	7:13
4.	"Theme 4"	"NOFVJ0224040"	2:14
5.	"Theme 5"	"NOFVJ0224050"	4:48
6.	"Theme 6"	"NOFVJ0224060"	2:41
7.	"Theme 7"	"NOFVJ0224070"	2:38
8.	"Theme 8"	"NOFVJ0224080"	4:17
9.	"Theme 9"	"NOFVJ0224090"	5:50
10.	"Theme 10"	"NOFVJ0224100"	3:44
Total length:			36:23

== Personnel ==
Ulver

- Trickster G. Rex
- Tore Ylwizaker
- Jørn H. Sværen
