= Svidd neger =

Norwegian film

Ammrika (Svidd neger - old tittle)
- English: Scorched Negro
- Directed by: Erik Smith Meyer
- Written by: Stein Elvestad
- Produced by: Erling Falch; Knud Bjørne-Larsen; Jan-Erik Gammleng
- Starring: Kingsford Siayor; Eirik Junge Eliassen; Björn Granath; Frank Jørstad; Guri Johnson
- Cinematography: Hoyte Van Hoytema
- Edited by: Hoyte Van Hoytema
- Music by: Ulver; Trond Nedberg
- Production companies: Barentsfilm AS; Borealis; Filmfalken A/S
- Distributed by: Oro Film A/S
- Release date: 2003
- Running time: 87 minutes
- Country: Norway

Svidd neger (in English, The Black Lapp or Scorched Negro) is a Norwegian film released in 2003, directed by Erik Smith Meyer and written by Stein Elvestad. Norwegian band Ulver provided the soundtrack. The plot revolves around two families living in a rural part of Norway. The main character is a young black man named ante who wants to be a Sami.

In 2024 the movie was re-released under a different title in Norway, Ammrika, claiming the original title being too offensive for modern times.
