= 1993–2003: 1st Decade in the Machines =

Remix album by Ulver
- Released: April 29, 2003
- Genre: Experimental, electronic, ambient
- Length: 78:44
- Label: Jester Records

Ulver chronology
Lyckantropen Themes (2002)	1993–2003: 1st Decade in the Machines (2003)	A Quick Fix of Melancholy (2003)

1993–2003: 1st Decade in the Machines is a remix album commissioned by Ulver, issued on April 29, 2003 via Jester Records. The album celebrates Ulver's ten year anniversary and features remixes by Ulver, Alexander Rishaug, Information, The Third Eye Foundation, Upland, Bogdan Raczynski, Martin Horntveth, Neotropic, A. Wiltzie vs. Stars of the Lid, Fennesz, Pita, Jazzkammer, V/Vm and Merzbow.

== Critical reception ==
Professional ratings
Review scores
Source	Rating
AllMusic	link

William York, writing for AllMusic, rated the album 3.5/5 and commented: "It seems clear that some care was put into this CD so that it doesn't appear carelessly thrown together or incoherent like so many remix albums, which is nice. The album flows well and doesn't contain any outright duds or annoying throwaways. On the other hand, it is still just a remix CD, and it will therefore appeal to a limited audience of electronic-era Ulver obsessives and/or die-hard fans of the remix artists."

Writing for webzine Chronicles of Chaos, Pedro Azevedo rated the album 4.5/10, commenting: "There is much in this disc that sounds anonymous and devoid both of context and interest. Even Ulver's own opening track fails to stand out from the collection, but there are still some very good tracks amidst all this, unrelated as they may sound. Perhaps the purpose of this collection has been achieved; perhaps some people other than the fourteen authors of these remixes will find considerable interest in the entirety of this disc, instead of less than half of it—but for this listener, this compilation as a whole presents insufficient aesthetic and musical value."

Aversion Online rated the album 8/10, commenting: "All in all this is a nice tribute to Ulver. Of course there are some weak moments, but there's really only one completely worthless song here—the rest all have strengths. And if nothing else, I find it interesting to hear how these artists have remixed both Ulver's old and new material to achieve different results."

Writing for webzine Satan Stole My Teddybear, John Chedsey adds: "Needless to say, this is the first truly unnecessary Ulver release, but thankfully, it's technically not an Ulver release. Remix albums are almost always a waste and there's very little here that would warrant a mad rush to the CD store to demand a copy. This particularly remix album does little to change my opinion of the remix phenomenon. They're the only thing worse and less needed than a tribute album."

Niels van Rongen, commenting for Musique Machine, wrote: "Most—if not all—artists featured on 1st Decade are from the IDM, glitch scene. This is not a huge surprise since Ulver has been doing this kind of music for the last few years. Still it would've been nice to hear someone from outside this scene. As colleague Martijn Busink suggested to me, a dub version of Kveldssanger would've been great. And I miss the vocals. I know it's hard to successfully incorporate vocals in IDM and remixes, though it can be done. Nevertheless, 1993–2003: 1st Decade in the Machines is a really good remix album. It's an interesting release for long time Ulver fans, but also for people who are just starting to get into this kind of music. I wouldn't buy this if it's gonna be your first Ulver album. But everyone who is into their electronic period can easily pick this up. So, happy birthday, Ulver, and a toast to another 10 great years."

== Track listing ==
No.	Title	Length
1.	"Crack Bug" (Ulver)	3:33
2.	"A Little Wiser Than the Monkey, Much Wiser Than Seven Men" (Alexander Rishaug)	7:56
3.	"Track Slow Snow" (Information)	6:32
4.	"Lyckantropen Remix" (The Third Eye Foundation)	3:59
5.	"Lost in Moments Remix" (Upland)	2:41
6.	"Bog's Basil & Curry Powder Potatos Recipe" (Bogdan Raczynski)	5:05
7.	"Der Alte" (Martin Horntveth)	4:38
8.	"He Said – She Said" (Neotropic)	7:03
9.	"I Love You, but I Prefer Trondheim (Parts 1–4)" (A. Wiltzie vs. Stars of the Lid)	10:22
10.	"Only the Poor Have to Travel" (Fennesz)	4:11
11.	"Ulvrmxsw5" (Pita)	6:46
12.	"Wolf Rotorvator" (Jazzkammer)	3:31
13.	"The Descent of Men" (V/Vm)	2:23
14.	"Vow Me Ibrzu" (Merzbow)	10:00
