= Scary Muzak =

Studio album by Ulver
- Released: October 31, 2021
- Recorded: Deviant Lab
- Genre: Synth pop
- Length: 38:16
- Label: House of Mythology
- Producer: Ulver

Ulver chronology
| Flowers of Evil (2020) | Scary Muzak (2021) | Liminal Animals (2024) |

Scary Muzak is the thirteenth studio album by the Norwegian experimental electronica band Ulver, released in 2021 on October 31 (Halloween). The album is heavily inspired by soundtracks from 1970s and 1980s horror movies, with five out of the twelve songs on the album incorporating music from the soundtrack to John Carpenter's 1978 film Halloween.

== Track listing ==
| No. | Title | Length |
|---|---|---|
| 1. | "Aleen Howl" ("Halloween Theme") | 4:07 |
| 2. | "Ateliers Hume" | 2:21 |
| 3. | "Genet Nightingale" | 2:21 |
| 4. | "Addi Fled Hon" | 3:52 |
| 5. | "Alchemist Salk" | 2:18 |
| 6. | "Boo Sackloth" | 1:44 |
| 7. | "Evil Longbows" | 3:31 |
| 8. | "Club Fuego" | 4:47 |
| 9. | "Achilles Milk" | 2:14 |
| 10. | "ECM Panorama" | 4:56 |
| 11. | "Redrum Al Brut" | 1:34 |
| 12. | "RIP Brouhaha" | 4:31 |
| Total length: | | 38:16 |

== Personnel ==
- Kristoffer Rygg – percussion
- Ole Alexander Halstensgård – electronics
- Tore Ylwizaker – synthesizer
- Stian Westerhus – guitar
