= Silence Teaches You How to Sing =

EP by Ulver
- Released: 3 September 2001
- Genres: Glitch, dark ambient
- Length: 24:05
- Label: Jester

Ulver chronology
Perdition City (2000)	Silence Teaches You How to Sing (2001)	Silencing the Singing (2001)

Silence Teaches You How to Sing is an EP by Norwegian experimental electronica band Ulver. Recorded and mixed in February 2001, the EP was issued by Jester Records in September 2001. Loosely recorded during the sessions for the Perdition City, together with Silencing the Singing, the EP is a subtle counterpart to the more dramatic full-length, issued in March 2000.

The style is more atmospheric and less beat-oriented than the music on Perdition City. Due to the experimental nature of the music, both Silence EP’s were limited to 2000 and 3000 copies, respectively. However, both were re-released as one disc, issued through American independent label Black Apple Records, under the title Teachings in Silence, in November 2002.

Portions of the EP appeared in the 2012 supernatural horror film Sinister as well as its sequel, Sinister 2.

== Critical reception ==
Professional ratings
Review scores
Source	Rating
Allmusic	link
Chronicles of Chaos	link

William York, writing for AllMusic rated the EP four stars, commenting, “Silence Teaches You How to Sing has the same type of subdued, rainy night in the city atmosphere as that album, but here the material is not beat-oriented like on Perdition City, and it is also a lot more sparse than anything on that album. Sharing more in common with experimental/electronic artists such as Coil, Pole, and Tarwater. It's a risky move for Ulver to be stepping into this territory, but here, at least, the band has managed to pull it off with a subtle counterpart to the more dramatic Perdition City.”

Alvin Wee, writing for Chronicles of Chaos, noted, “Minimalist and sparsely beautiful, the single twenty-minute track gradually sweeps forward with near-inaudible drones and subtle statics, occasionally throwing glowing sparks of light into the sombreness with higher-end metallic resonances. What's unsettling is the music's ability to retain its icy core while pouring forth warmer organic tones: the aura of desolation and despair becomes apparent not long into the disc, and never releases its chilly grip on the soul for a moment. It's one that open-minded listeners won't want to miss. This is sugar-coated depression at its best.”

John Chedsey, writing for Satan Stole My Teddybear, ascertains, “The cumulative effect of listening to this EP is similar to someone scanning through radio stations on the AM band and occasionally landing on musical pieces. The twenty plus minutes of the EP takes the listener through static, peripheral sound effects and takes one on a short journey. The more musical moments are akin to the mood pieces on Perdition City, giving the listener one last visit (well, almost) in this urban landscape before Ulver moves onto their next adventure.”

== Track listing ==
No.	Title	Length
1.	"Silence Teaches You How to Sing"	24:05

== Personnel ==
Ulver

- Kristoffer Rygg (credited as "Trickster G.") - electronic programming
- Tore Ylwizaker - electronic programming
- Jørn H. Sværen - electronic programming
