= When (band) =

- Also known as: Lars Pedersen
- Origin: Oslo, Norway
- Genres: Psychedelic, rock, noise, pop
- Years active: 1987-
- Labels: Jester, Witchwood, previously RēR Megacorp, Tatra

When is the musical project of Norwegian artist Lars Pedersen.

== Lars Pedersen ==
Lars Pedersen was born in 1961, in Oslo, Norway. His father, Tore Pedersen, was a Norwegian musical composer. At an early age, the younger Pedersen performed with his four older sisters and older brother; they were often compared to the Jackson 5 and The Partridge Family, popular bands of the time. Being in the spotlight at a young age, Pedersen met Chuck Berry and other stars.

In the late 1970s, Pedersen played in Hærverk, one of the first Norwegian punk bands, and later – as the 1980s arrived – went on to form the band The Last James. The Last James explored The Beatles/Beach Boys sound, releasing three albums, Grape, The Last James and Kindergarten. During the 1980s and early 1990s, Pedersen was also a member of the renowned experimental/industrial/new wave group Holy Toy, together with Andrej D. Nebb. The band became active again in 2011.

== Early releases ==
In 1983, Pedersen launched the one-man project Hospital Blimp, which would later become When. The debut album Drowning but Learning, was released in 1987, with When's trademark collage/cut-up technique already apparent.

In 1988, When released Death in the Blue Lake, inspired by Norwegian author André Bjerke's psychological horror novel of the same name. The album had a strong atmosphere of fear and mourning, and was quite popular in Norwegian black metal circles. An excerpt from the album's A-side was commissioned as an intro to Satyricon's Dark Medieval Times "Walk the path of sorrows". The B-side of the album is an amalgamation of ethnic music, blues harmonica, coughing, psychedelic pop and glissandi effects. Today it is almost impossible to track down a copy of the album.

Black, White & Grey, When's third album, conjured up images of war and urban decay. Chris Cutler (Henry Cow, Art Bears, etc.), who contributed to the album, was also a central inspiration. The album was released on Cutler's RéR Megacorp in 1990.

1992 saw the release of Svartedauen (Norwegian for "The Black Death"), a 38-minute musical description of the ravages of the bubonic plague in Norway around 1349. The album borrows elements from Norwegian folk music, and features a host of disturbing sounds: hearses, moans of the dying, rats, flagellants' whips and a scythe being sharpened, to name but a few.

On 1994's Prefab Wreckage, When slowly started moving from the more abstract soundtracks of the earlier albums and towards a more song-oriented sound. The inner sleeve is a painting by Hieronymus Bosch, one of the album's inspirations.

In 1997, When released Gynt, which according to the liner notes is a "satiric play on Edvard Grieg's Peer Gynt. Inspired by Henrik Ibsen." As Pedersen says: "I tried to put irony into the music. There is a lot of humour in When's music, it's not bloody serious all the time."

== Jester Records ==
After Gynt, When was signed by Jester Records, newly set-up by Kristoffer Garm Rygg of Ulver, and the next album would mark another radical change in When's musical direction. Psychedelic Wunderbaum was indeed a psychedelic mix, with apparent inspirations from rock, noise, and cartoon music, and with lyrics taken from Aleister Crowley and Tom Wolfe. Pedersen remarked:

I fetched many grooves from old, obscure psychedelic garage bands. It was something I had wanted to do for a long time, but I thought that it might be too audacious. But as more and more artists seem to be using that method, I figured that I could do it too. I dug up the old Farfisa organ that I had used in Holy Toy and got Bjørn Sorknes, the old Holy Toy guitarist, with me. We worked together on the production as well. It became a sort of crossing between industrial and psychedelic rock.

The next album, The Lobster Boys, was Pedersen's most pop-oriented effort so far. Many of the songs were reminiscent of The Beach Boys and/or The Beatles, but there's always something just a little "off" and odd about When's music that sets it apart from more mainstream acts. Some tracks start out as "normal" rock, but often end up in a cacophony of weird samples and madness before reaching an end. The Lobster Boys was also heavily inspired by Arabic music.

Nils Arne Øvergård and Øyvind Borgemoen joined When as full members on this recording. The trio has played several concerts, including the release party for the single "Sunshine Superhead", where they performed in bear costumes with paper-mâché guitars. The same song also got heavy radio rotation in Norway that summer.

In 2003, When released Pearl-Harvest, more or less The Lobster Boys part II, but with lyrical concepts taken from The Arabian Nights. Combine those fables with sampled, shambling Middle Eastern bazaar muzak, jangling exotica and electronics, and you've got When's winning formula.

When's 2004 album Whenever features a characteristic mix of Middle Eastern influences, African tribal rhythms, as well as trademark When collages and cartoon loops. The lyrics, written by Chris Cutler, often deal with grim subject matter such as the apocalypse and death.

In 2007, When released their latest album, "Trippy Happy". Bringing back a sound that hasn't been heard since the late 60s, Trippy Happy explored folky pop ballads, banjo lullabies, baroque psychedelia, and industrial cartoon surrealism.

The album was a return to the sound of The Last James, as it featured appearances by Haakon Ellingsen of the Last James on banjo, voices, and piano and Øyvind Borgemoen on accordion/piano.

On February 17, 2008, When announced the forthcoming release of their twelfth album, You Are Silent, for April 28, 2008. The announcement suggests that the sound is darker and closer to Prefab Wreckage than to recent releases.

== Discography ==
- Drowning but Learning (1987)
- Death in the Blue Lake (1988)
- Black White & Grey (1991)
- The Black Death (1992)
- Prefab Wreckage (1994)
- Gynt (1997)
- Psychedelic Wunderbaum (1999)
- WriterCakebox: The Unblessed World of When 1983–1998 (2CD-compilation, 1999)
- The Lobster Boys (2001)
- Sunshine Superhead (cd-single, 2002)
- Pearl Harvest (2003)
- Whenever (2004)
- Trippy Happy (2007)
- You Are Silent (2008)
- Homage Series Vol. 1: Sun Ra (2009)
- Misshimmisshimmisshim (2011)
- Whensday (2012)

== Compilation appearances ==
- ReR Records Quarterly Vol. 2 No. 3
- The Eye Decay Theory, or when the garden becomes a time lapse
- ReR Records Quarterly Vol. 3 No. 3
- Ur-Rauten
- Art Bears: The Art Box
