= Lyckantropen =

- Directed by: Steve Ericsson
- Written by: Steve Ericsson; Mikke Schirén
- Cinematography: Linus Sandgren
- Edited by: Jason Meredith
- Music by: Ulver
- Production company: Golden Film
- Release dates: August 31, 2002 (Sweden); 2003 (United States)
- Running time: 28 minutes
- Language: Swedish

Lyckantropen (2002) is a Swedish short film written and directed by Steve Ericsson. It follows a family in a small town that struggles with relationship balance and internal emotional conflicts. The film is only 28 minutes long and features minimal dialogue throughout.

The soundtrack, Lyckantropen Themes, was composed by Norwegian avant-garde electronica / black metal band Ulver.
