= Themes from William Blake's The Marriage of Heaven and Hell =

- Slipcase cover

Studio album by Ulver
- Released: 17 December 1998
- Recorded: 1997–1998
- Studio: Beep Jam Studio
- Genre: Experimental; post-industrial; avant-garde metal; industrial metal; ambient
- Length: 101:09
- Label: Jester

Ulver chronology
| The Trilogie - Three Journeyes Through the Norwegian Netherworlde (1997) | Themes from William Blake's The Marriage of Heaven and Hell (1998) | Metamorphosis (1999) |

Ulver studio album chronology
| Nattens Madrigal – Aatte Hymne Til Ulven I Manden (1997) | Themes from William Blake's The Marriage of Heaven and Hell (1998) | Perdition City (2000) |

2012 physical reissue

2021 physical reissue

Themes from William Blake's The Marriage of Heaven and Hell is the fourth studio album by Norwegian experimental electronica band Ulver. Produced with Kristoffer Rygg, together with Knut Magne Valle and Tore Ylwizaker, it was issued on 17 December 1998 via Jester Records. It is a musical adaptation of William Blake's poem The Marriage of Heaven and Hell. The album blends electronics, industrial music elements, progressive metal, experimental rock and ambient passages, following Blake's plates as track indexes. Stine Grytøyr, Ihsahn, Samoth and Fenriz all feature as guest vocalists.

The album received widespread acclaim from critics within the rock, metal and alternative music press, being awarded Album of the Month in several high-profile magazines such as Terrorizer, Metal Hammer, and Rock Hard and ranked very highly in their end of year's best polls. However, the band's new electronic sound alienated many fans of their first three albums, causing a backlash from the black metal scene.

== Background ==
In late 1997, Kristoffer Rygg invited keyboardist, sound conceptualist, and composer Tore Ylwizaker into the collective, and together they devised a plan for The Blake Album. Musically, the album transcended black metal's aesthetics to create a genre-defying work and incorporated everything from ambient and classical sounds to industrial, progressive metal, and art rock.

Rygg stated, "For me the Blake record kind of signifies the second chapter or the new beginning – newer if you will – and not only from an ideological or lyrical perspective, but also musically because by that time I had acquired knowledge on technology and how to work with software and computers so we kind of had the knowledge to do new things with music. In a way it's quite natural that we wanted to explore other things almost from the beginning, which I think the second album, Kveldssanger, is a good example of. So we were never, like, strictly into black metal. It's actually pretty natural. I think a lot of people tend to think of it as very weird or very strange that the focus shifted so radically, but I don't."

The album and the band in general received considerable backlash from the black metal community for abruptly changing musical styles, though the band expressly claimed to not be part of the "so-called black metal scene" in the liner notes of the booklet. While black metal purists were taken aback by the experimentation of the album, it was responsible for introducing Ulver to a far wider audience. The shift in musical direction also caused discontent between Rygg and German label Century Media, resulting in the band being dropped from the roster and Rygg subsequently forming his own label, Jester Records.

Rygg, commenting in Unrestrained magazine in 2007, said, "We spent a couple of years designing [this album], so that was by far the most serious and elaborate musical process we undertook at the time. I had started getting into computers and how you could use different software to manipulate sounds, and that led to the expansion of the palette, and how we made music. That was an interest which was there from the beginning. I think the whole perception that we just made a 180-degree shift towards something else is not entirely correct. I think we just wanted to leave the black metal thing because we felt it was limiting. Our perspectives on religion and society had started to become more difficult as well. That's why Blake was hugely interesting to us, because it was just so much more of a meticulous vision than the dissentient perspective we were part of at the time. You're always more angry when you're young and you become more moderate as you grow older so that's why Blake was fascinating to us. That was the start of chapter two, if you will, of our history." Continuing, "I was hugely into Coil and I found their music to be immensely fascinating. I checked out all their references – chaos magick, Alfred Jarry, Austin Spare and Blake and so forth. I was in London in '96 on a trip together with Ihsahn of Emperor and we went to this place, Atlantis Bookshop, a quite legendary bookstore for occult literature and stuff like that. I picked up a beautiful copy of The Marriage of Heaven and Hell and it just blew me away. I totally identified with his (Blake) way of seeing things, even though it is profoundly personal stuff."

The avant-garde electronic and progressive metal approach and clean vocal style of the album are similar to those employed by Rygg on the Arcturus album La Masquerade Infernale, released a year earlier.

== Critical reception ==
Professional ratings
Review scores
| Source | Rating |
|---|---|
| AllMusic | link |
| Sputnikmusic | link |

Themes from William Blake's The Marriage of Heaven and Hell was met with critical acclaim at the time of its release, with most reviewers commenting on the drastic change in musical direction, and the ambitious task of setting William Blake's poem to music.

Writing for AllMusic, Jason Hundy commented, "Every single album they put out is almost a complete 180 from the last, which, although strange, is a very admirable quality to this band, and Marriage is no different. Between the eerie music, awkward vocals, and mysterious religious lyrics, this album has everything for the eccentric fans out in metal-land."

Oliver Side, writing for avantgarde-metal.com, comments, "[The Blake album is] clearly a great step outside what they previously had been associated with, namely black metal. The whole double album is very genre-schizophrenic, as there are also more moody, almost ambient-like acoustic tracks, and all the musical focus is put on each of Blake's inspirational shifts of emotions, so it basically changes all the time.”

Webzine Metal Reviews concluded "Themes from William Blake's The Marriage of Heaven and Hell may be messy and perhaps a little too ambitious for its own good, but yet it prevails because it's so damn brave. A complete musical reboot, and as such it has its flaws. As their peers floundered around them, Ulver took flight, and if they hadn't chosen to abandon metal entirely, they may not have even existed today."

Reviewer John Chedsey commented, “The shift into yet another musical realm should come as no surprise to anyone who has kept tabs on this group of musicians. Ulver's artistic vision extends beyond simply the area where they began.”

Given this diversity, the response from the metal media came highly unexpected: 10/10 points in Rock Hard (D); 7/7 points and Album of the Month in Hammer Magazine (D); Album of the Month in Terrorizer (UK); 15/15 in Deftone (D); 15/15 in Legacy (D); 10/10 in Psycho (IT); and 12/12 in Thrash'em All (POL).

== Track listing ==
All lyrics are written by William Blake.

Disc 1
| No. | Title | Length |
|---|---|---|
| 1. | "The Argument, Plate 2" | 4:03 |
| 2. | "Plate 3" | 2:48 |
| 3. | "Plate 3, Following" | 1:33 |
| 4. | "The Voice of the Devil, Plate 4" | 2:49 |
| 5. | "Plates 5–6" | 2:31 |
| 6. | "A Memorable Fancy, Plates 6–7" | 4:24 |
| 7. | "Proverbs of Hell, Plates 7–10" | 9:06 |
| 8. | "Plate 11" | 2:01 |
| 9. | "Instrumental 1" | 3:26 |
| 10. | "A Memorable Fancy, Plates 12–13" | 5:59 |
| 11. | "Plate 14" | 2:08 |
| 12. | "A Memorable Fancy, Plate 15" | 4:51 |
| 13. | "Plates 16–17" | 3:17 |
| Total length: | | 48:56 |

Disc 2
| No. | Title | Length |
|---|---|---|
| 1. | "A Memorable Fancy, Plates 17–20" | 11:23 |
| 2. | "Instrumental 2" | 2:27 |
| 3. | "Plates 21–22" | 3:11 |
| 4. | "A Memorable Fancy, Plates 22–24" | 4:50 |
| 5. | "Instrumental 3" | 3:59 |
| 6. | "A Song of Liberty, Plates 25–27" (featuring Ihsahn, Samoth and Fenriz. The song ends at 5:34; a hidden track, "Chorus", begins at 25:36) | 26:23 |
| Total length: | | 52:13 |

== Personnel ==
Ulver

- Kristoffer Rygg (credited as "Trickster G.") – vocals, engineering, production
- Tore Ylwizaker – electronic programming, engineering, mixing, co-production
- Håvard Jørgensen – electric guitar
- Hugh Steven James Mingay – bass guitar
- E. Lancelot – drums

Additional musicians

- Stine Grytøyr – vocals (female)
- Falch – vinyl scratching
- Ihsahn – additional vocals ("A Song of Liberty, Plates 25–27")
- Samoth – additional vocals ("A Song of Liberty, Plates 25–27")
- Fenriz – additional vocals ("A Song of Liberty, Plates 25–27")

Other credits

- Knut Magne Valle – cables, wires and various sound contributions, engineering, co-production
- Børge Finstad – mixing
- Audhild Johanne Rype – mastering
- Lamin Nilsen Chorr – aesthetics
