= Wars of the Roses (album) =

Studio album by Ulver
- Released: 25 April 2011
- Genre: Art rock; dark ambient
- Length: 45:29
- Label: Kscope
- Producer: Ulver, John Fryer, Jaime Gomez Arellano

Ulver chronology
Shadows of the Sun (2007)	Wars of the Roses (2011)	The Norwegian National Opera (2011)

Ulver studio album chronology
Shadows of the Sun (2007)	Wars of the Roses (2011)	Childhood's End (2012)

Wars of the Roses is the eighth studio album by the Norwegian experimental electronica band Ulver. The album was produced by Ulver, with John Fryer and Jaime Gomez Arellano, and issued in the UK on 25 April 2011 via Jester Records and Kscope, preceded by a single, "February MMX", in February. The album was released in the U.S. on 3 May 2011. Wars of the Roses is the first album to feature new member, British composer and multi-instrumentalist Daniel O'Sullivan (Æthenor, Guapo, Mothlite).

Wars of the Roses amalgamates "musical traits from its predecessors while re-shaping them with a more direct approach". Sputnikmusic noted "Wars of the Roses' thoughtful conception and execution serves only for a thoughtful listen. After all this time, it still remains a privilege to bear witness to these wolves evolve once again".

Wars of the Roses was mixed by producer John Fryer (Depeche Mode, Cocteau Twins, Swans etc.), following a chance meeting outside Crystal Canyon studios, Norway, during the latter stages of recording.

The album entered the Norwegian national album charts at Number 17, based on sales from one day alone, holding up for two subsequent weeks. It also entered the Finnish national album charts at Number 30 where it held up for one week.

== Background ==
In an interview with Puregrainaudio.com, Kristoffer Rygg commented on the inspiration behind Wars Of The Roses, "I think the last couple of years we've been getting kind of wanting to make not only kind of cinematical [music] but also pictorial lyrics to accompany it, so I think that kind of an idea we've taken a bit further this time, whereas the music itself is a bit more fragmented, the songs are more of [individual] pieces, as opposed to Shadows, which was a more holistic thing. Also lyrically, it may be a bit more internalised on this one. It's kind of like painting lyrical postcards almost, touching on cultural traditions and things like that."

Rygg commented on working with Daniel O'Sullivan, "He's also very involved... and he was a very big resource this time in the live context... because there is a certain kind of method to our madness and that's something that he's had to kind of work within that kind of [framework]. So, put it this way: The album would have sounded different if he wasn't part of it. There's a reason why we invited him to become a member, and it's not only to do with the fact that he's a big musician. It's kind of a shared sensibility."

== Critical reception ==
Professional ratings
Review scores
Source	Rating
AllMusic	3/5 stars
Metal Storm	(8.7/10)
Sea of Tranquility	4.5/5 stars
Prog Sphere	(favorable)
Sputnikmusic	4/5 stars

Upon release, Wars of the Roses received generally positive reviews from music critics.

Murat Batmaz, writing for Sea of Tranquility webzine, commented, "It amalgamates musical traits from its predecessors while re-shaping them with a more direct approach. The album derives its power from being extremely varied, as it is comprised by far-reaching sonic experiments."

Conor Fynes, writing for Prog Sphere, comments, "The strength of Wars of the Roses is in its grand instrumentation and clever electronic arrangements. It's certainly an album that grows with each listen; after all, hasn't the music of Ulver always been one to play hard-to-get?"

Rating the album 4/5, Sputnikmusic, commented, "While this may prove to be one of their most challenging releases, in time, it may also prove to be one of the most rewarding. Garm and company have prepared a bleak and entrancing journey meant to be taken time and again. Regardless of favor, it accomplishes that which true art is purposed - making one think. Wars of the Roses' thoughtful conception and execution serves only for a thoughtful listen. After all this time, it still remains a privilege to bear witness to these wolves evolve once again."

William Ruhlmann, writing for AllMusic, commented, "Over more than a decade and a half, listeners have learned to expect the unexpected from Ulver, who started out as a Norwegian heavy metal band but have turned far more experimental. Wars of the Roses begins sounding like a fairly conventional rock album, in which the mainstream track 'February MMX' boasts socially conscious lyrics, and 'September IV' also suggests mainstream rock. But more of the album is given over to selections like 'Norwegian Gothic' and especially the nearly 15-minute closer, 'Stone Angels', with slow, ambient tracks featuring sound effects and poetic, spoken word vocals written by poet Keith Waldrop. The closest antecedent, notably on 'England' and 'Island', with their slow, ponderous tempos and calm vocals, is Pink Floyd, making Ulver as of 2011 something of a neo-progressive rock band."

Webzine Metal Storm commented, "Wars of the Roses almost seems to be a bit of a retrospective of the past dozen years of the band's existence. This album is slow, mellow, moody, melancholic, and heavily atmospheric."

Zero Tolerance described the album as "quite beautiful record of startlingly powerful depth".

== Track listing ==
No.	Title	Length
1.	"February MMX"	4:11
2.	"Norwegian Gothic"	3:37
3.	"Providence"	8:10
4.	"September IV"	4:39
5.	"England"	4:09
6.	"Island"	5:47
7.	"Stone Angels"	14:56
Total length:		45:29

== Personnel ==
Ulver

- Kristoffer Rygg - vocals, programming, producer
- Tore Ylwizaker - keyboards, programming, producer
- Jørn H. Sværen - miscellaneous
- Daniel O'Sullivan - guitar, bass, keyboards, producer, mixing (7)

Additional Musicians

- Tomas Pettersen - drums
- Ole Aleksander Halstensgård - electronics
- Trond Mjøen - electric guitar (1,4), bass (3,4), acoustic guitar (6), lap steel guitar (6)
- Stian Westerhus - bowed electric guitar (2,3,7), electric guitar (6)
- Daniel Quill - violin (2,3,5)
- Alex Ward - clarinet (2,3)
- Steve Noble - drums, percussion (2,7)
- Attila Csihar, Siri Stranger - vocals (3)
- Emil Huemer - guitar (4)
- Anders Møller - percussion (6)
- Stephen Thrower - clarinet (7)

Other Credits

- John Fryer - mixing (1–6)
- Trine Paulsen – cover and artwork
- Kim Sølve – cover and artwork
- Jaime Gomez Arellano technical producer
