= Teachings in Silence =

Compilation album by Ulver
- Released: March 2002 (U.S.A.); March 2003 (Europe)
- Genre: Experimental, electronic, glitch
- Length: 52:59
- Label: Jester

Ulver chronology
Silencing the Singing (2001)	Teachings in Silence (2002)	Lyckantropen Themes (2002)

Teachings in Silence is a compilation album by Norwegian collective Ulver. Issued through American independent label Black Apple Records in March 2002, it combines Silence Teaches You How to Sing and Silencing the Singing, originally issued in September and December 2001, respectively. It was subsequently released in Europe one year later by Norwegian record company Jester Records. Due to the experimental nature of the music, both Silence EPs were limited to two thousand, and three thousand copies.

The two EPs combined was released as a double LP in 2014 by Ampullae Audio. The release was limited to 500.
Repressed by Jester Records in CD format in year 2017.

This release was nominated for a Spellemannprisen in 2003; an award presented to Norwegian musicians, in the 'Electronic' category.

In February 2014, in an interview with Heathen Harvest, Kristoffer Rygg announced that both Silence Teaches You How to Sing and Silencing the Singing were going to be released on high-quality double vinyl through Jaime Gomez Arellano’s new audiophile label Ampullae Audio. Adding “We haven’t listened to that stuff for years and I enjoyed that process a lot — remastering it and listening to it again, in a quite involved way. I’m satisfied with those experiments, definitely. It’s weird to think it’s over ten years since we made those EPs. They sound very modern to me.”

Arellano continues, “The Silence EP's were two experiments and/or “studies in sound” made by Ulver (Kristoffer Rygg & Tore Ylvisaker) in 2001. They were later released as one CD under the name Teachings In Silence. The music from these sessions were [sic] made up by the boys just fooling around in their studio with an Akai S3000 sampler, synth(s), paper and scissors (literally), glitches, clicks and odd sounds - they even recorded their PC's hard drive overheating... I have long loved these weird - and creepy - gems from Ulver's by now very large treasure chest of first class music. In fact excerpts from Silence Teaches You How to Sing were recently used to great effect in the hit horror movie Sinister. No wonder really. It's perfect dark, dreamy and trippy stuff. So when Steve and I started Ampullae, I asked Kris if he would be up for me re-mastering and re-releasing these high-fidelity, carefully cut and considered, heavy vinyls. Thankfully he agreed. We are very pleased with the result and we hope this will be the first in an eclectic mix of personal choice favourites of never before released (audiophile) vinyl curiosa and curation from us...”

== Track listing ==
No.	Title	Length
1.	"Silence Teaches You How to Sing"	24:05
2.	"Darling Didn't We Kill You?"	8:52
3.	"Speak Dead Speaker"	9:33
4.	"Not Saved"	10:29

== Personnel ==
Ulver

- Tore Ylwizaker
- Jørn H. Sværen
- Trickster G. Rex
