= Metamorphosis (EP) =

EP by Ulver
- Released: 27 September 1999
- Genre: Electronic, experimental
- Length: 25:15
- Label: Jester

Ulver chronology
Themes from William Blake's The Marriage of Heaven and Hell (1998)	Metamorphosis (1999)	Perdition City (2000)

Metamorphosis is the first EP by Norwegian experimental electronic band Ulver. Written and produced by Kristoffer Rygg and Tore Ylwizaker, the EP was issued on 27 September 1999 via Jester Records. The EP showcased Ulver's new electronic musical direction that would become more readily apparent on the album Perdition City.

In the sleeve notes to Metamorphosis, the group declared:

Ulver is obviously not a black metal band and does not wish to be stigmatized as such. We acknowledge the relation of part I & III of the Trilogie (Bergtatt & Nattens Madrigal) to this culture, but stress that these endeavours were written as stepping stones rather than conclusions. We are proud of our former instincts, but wish to liken our association with said genre to that of the snake with Eve. An incentive to further frolic only. If this discourages you in any way, please have the courtesy to refrain from voicing superficial remarks regarding our music and/or personae. We are as unknown to you as we always were.

== Background ==
Kristoffer Rygg commented “[Metamorphosis] was totally electronic, at parts even techno. When we are in the studio, things seem to go their own paths. We never write anything in advance but all is improvised in the studio. Usually we have only a pattern, a loop or a sound we like. Then we just play with that sound until it becomes a song.“

== Critical reception ==
Professional ratings
Review scores
Source	Rating
AllMusic	link

Upon its original release, Metamorphosis received mixed reviews.

John Chedsey, writing for Satan Stole My Teddybear, commented: “Having consistently reinvented themselves on every release, Ulver has made the final transformation into an electronic act in the vein of Future Sound of London or a more resonant and layered Aphex Twin. The EP captures their new sound fairly well. As a preview for their upcoming Perdition City, Metamorphosis is a great teaser.

== Track listing ==
No.	Title	Length
1.	"Of Wolves & Vibrancy"	4:45
2.	"Gnosis" (Words taken from "Bad Blood" by Arthur Rimbaud)	7:59
3.	"Limbo Central (Theme from Perdition City)"	3:36
4.	"Of Wolves & Withdrawal"	8:55

== Personnel ==
Ulver

- Kristoffer Rygg (credited as "Trickster G.") - electronic programming
- Tore Ylwizaker - electronic programming
- Håvard Jørgensen - electronic programming

Technical personnel

- Ingar Hunskaar - mastering
- Tore Ylwizaker - mixing
