= Silencing the Singing =

EP by Ulver
- Released: 4 December 2001
- Genres: Experimental, electronic, glitch
- Length: 28:54
- Label: Jester

Ulver chronology
Silence Teaches You How to Sing (2001)	Silencing the Singing (2001)	Teachings in Silence (2002)

Silencing the Singing is an EP by Norwegian experimental collective Ulver. Recorded and mixed in February 2001, the EP was issued by Jester Records in December 2001. Loosely recorded during the sessions for the Perdition City, together with Silence Teaches You How to Sing, the EP is a subtle counterpart to the more dramatic full-length, issued in March 2000.

The style is more atmospheric and less beat-oriented than the music on Perdition City. Due to the experimental nature of the music, both Silence EPs were limited to 2000 and 3000 copies, respectively. However, both were re-released as one disc, issued through American independent label Black Apple Records, under the title Teachings in Silence, in November 2002.

== Critical reception ==
Professional ratings
Review scores
Source	Rating
Allmusic	link
Chronicles of Chaos	link

William York, writing for AllMusic rated the EP three stars, commenting, "Silencing the Singing is Ulver's first entirely instrumental release, but otherwise a continuation of the moody, electronic-based sounds. The mood is ambiguous—not terribly dark or sad, but somewhat reflective and somber all the same. This EP is not a grand statement like each of Ulver's first five albums were, nor is it a drastic shift from what came before it (a change considering Ulver's usually unpredictable ways), but it's a nice, enjoyable disc all the same.”

John Chedsey, writing for Satan Stole My Teddybear, noted, “If Perdition City laid down the grid, streets, highways and zoning laws for that particular urban center, the following two EPs, Silence Teaches You How To Sing and Silencing the Singing, are two separate journeys through some of the forgotten alleyways. Their sessions for Perdition City continue to prove that the Norwegian outfit was truly onto some magical inspiration with their latest muse. The music is subtle and best experienced at night through a good pair of headphones as it is the type of thing that relies on a tired mind for the best wanderings.”

Quentin Kalis, writing for Chronicles of Chaos, rated the EP 9.5 out of 10, commenting, "Bits of static noise and various other bits of white noise litter the album at what appears to be seemingly random spots -- but this is Ulver, after all, and one gets the impression that each bit of noise is placed where it is for a reason. My personal favourite is "Not Saved", a beautiful, haunting song, calming by its very repetitiveness yet also creating a sense of sorrow. As the song fades out and you think the album has come to a close, it then returns with a vengeance, seemingly louder and more ominous than before."

== Track listing ==
No.	Title	Length
1.	"Darling Didn't We Kill You? (Ressurected from the PC Sessions)"	8:52
2.	"Speak Dead Speaker"	9:33
3.	"Not Saved"	10:29

== Personnel ==
Ulver

- Kristoffer Rygg (credited as "Trickster G.") - electronic programming
- Tore Ylwizaker - electronic programming
- Jørn H. Sværen - electronic programming
