= A Quick Fix of Melancholy =

EP by Ulver
- Released: 26 August 2003
- Recorded: Winter 2002
- Genre: Avant-garde, ambient
- Length: 22:55
- Label: Jester Records

Ulver chronology
1993–2003: 1st Decade in the Machines (2003)	A Quick Fix of Melancholy (2003)	Svidd neger (2003)

A Quick Fix of Melancholy is the fourth EP by Norwegian experimental collective Ulver. Produced in the Winter of 2002, the EP was issued on 26 August 2003 via Jester Records. A precursor to the album Blood Inside, A Quick Fix of Melancholy showcases the band's ability to seamlessly combine ambient and electronic music with orchestral elements.

The text from "Vowels" is by Canadian author Christian Bök, taken from Eunoia (Coach House Books, 2001) and used with permission. "Eitttlane" is a rearrangement of "Nattleite" from the 1996 album Kveldssanger.

In an interview with Modern Fix Kristoffer Rygg commented, "A Quick Fix of Melancholy was our way of trying to get back into writing songs—or something resembling songs—and also find out where we wanted to take things. I think after all our work with film, which is very kind of aesthetically fixed, you know. We ended up making Blood Inside."

== Critical reception ==
Professional ratings
Review scores
Source	Rating
Aversion Online	link
Global Domination	link

Aversion Online rated the EP 7/10, commenting, "Opener 'Little Blue Birds' clearly states that this EP is a lot different than the last few, what with its orchestral synths and operatic vocals."

Global Domination rated the EP 10/10, commenting, "There are moments of a general upbeat/pensive nature, most of this is very downhearted music, sometimes shifting towards the downright depressing. Instruments include drums, violins, cellos, chimes of some sort, trumpets, a whole bunch of other shit that at times incites a euphoric kind of dreaminess, at others just really gets you down. All together everything forms a sublime masterpiece."

John Chedsey, writing for Satan Stole My Teddybear, concluded, "This is so far one of the most impressive feats for Ulver, showing they are doing nothing but growing within their chosen musical pursuit. Music is indeed an extension of one's inner expressions and Ulver seems to have tapped into a musical vein that not many are aware of. The growing skill in which Ulver is putting together their music is quite impressive and this EP is making me salivate at the thought of future releases."

== Track listing ==
No.	Title	Length
1.	"Little Blue Bird"	6:35
2.	"Doom Sticks"	4:40
3.	"Vowels"	6:18
4.	"Eitttlane"	5:22

== Personnel ==
Ulver

- Kristoffer Rygg (credited as "Trickster G.") – vocals, electronic programming
- Tore Ylwizaker – electronic programming
- Jørn H. Sværen – electronic programming
