= Messe I.X–VI.X =

Studio album by Ulver
- Released: October 8, 2013
- Recorded: September 21, 2012
- Genre: Experimental; dark ambient
- Length: 44:52
- Label: Jester
- Producer: Ulver

Ulver chronology
Live at Roadburn (2012)	Messe I.X–VI.X (2013)	Terrestrials (2014)

Messe I.X–VI.X is the ninth studio album by the Norwegian experimental electronica band Ulver, created in collaboration with the Tromsø Chamber Orchestra with additional aid from composer Martin Romberg. Written and produced by Ulver, released on October 8, 2013, via Jester Records and Kscope.

On September 17, 2013, a trailer was released, and on October 4, 2013, the track "Shri Schneider" was released for streaming via Pitchfork.

== Background ==
The music was commissioned in 2012 by the Tromsø Kulturhus (House of Culture) in Norway, in a cooperation with the Arctic Opera and Philharmonic Orchestra cultural institution. It was composed and first performed live by Ulver, alongside the Tromsø Chamber Orchestra on September 21, 2012. The band then took the recordings back to Crystal Canyon, Oslo and spent winter and spring in post-production, honing the material for its studio-equivalent.

Six compositions altogether written and produced, recorded and mixed by Ulver, this time consisting of Ole Alexander Halstensgård, Kristoffer Rygg, Jørn H. Sværen and Tore Ylwizaker, with additional aid and advice from composer Martin Romberg who also arranged the music for the 21 members of Tromsø Chamber Orchestra. The album also features contemporary composers/musicians Ole-Henrik Moe and Kari Rønnekleiv.

The band named some of their influences for Messe I.X–VI.X:

Górecki's No. 3: Symphony of Sorrowful Songs. It haunted us for years and probably always will. The Gustavs Mahler and Holst. Sound collages from When or Nurse with Wound. 70's kraut and synth. Ash Ra and Autobahn. 80's pop scores. John Carpenter and Tin Drum. Terry Riley, again and again and again. Saint John of the Cross.

Opening song "As Syrians Pour In, Lebanon Grapples with Ghosts of a Bloody Past" was named after a news piece by Reuters concerning the flood of Syrian refugees into Lebanon following the ongoing Syrian civil war. However, vocalist Kristoffer Rygg has stated: "This appropriation is not any more, or less, political other than an indication of concern. We live in troubled times. The song itself has a distinct Middle Eastern feel to it and coupled with sounds of vultures and war that title seemed both appropriate as well as contemporary. But we have no ideology for sale. Only our sadness."

== Live performances ==
Following its original performance at Tromsø Kulturhus in Tromsø, Norway, with Tromsø Chamber Orchestra, on September 21, 2012, Ulver have performed Messe I.X–VI.X in its entirety a further two times: on May 20, 2013 at Wave Gotik Treffen, Leipzig, Germany with the Stüba Philharmonie, Volkspalast and on November 16, 2013 at Teatro Regio, Parma, Italy with the MG_INC Orchestra.

== Critical reception ==
Professional ratings
Review scores
Source	Rating
Adresseavisen	6/6
Exclaim!	8/10
Hifi.nl	9/10
Noise	10/10
Rock Area	10/10
Verdens Gang	6/6

Upon its release, Messe I.X–VI.X received positive reviews from music critics. Alex Franquelli, writing for The Quietus, described the album as "a challenging work and an album of rare beauty." Gregory Burkart, writing for Fearnet, described Messe I.X–VI.X as "one of the band's most surreal and haunting projects to date, combining their unorthodox soundscapes (which often incorporate elements of electronic music, metal, rock and folk instrumentation, blended through inventive production techniques) with a full symphony orchestra." Falk Wehmeier, writing for Metal.de, wrote "Ulver have found a perfect expression of their perception of a world void of home or footing… Within the scope of the chosen style, Ulver couldn't have clothed their message better in sound."

Robert Dłucik, writing for Polish online magazine Rock Area, gave Messe I.X–VI.X a 10/10 rating. Tor Martin Bøe, writing for Verdens Gang, gave the album a 6/6 rating. Martin Anfinsen, writing for Norwegian newspaper Adresseavisen, rated the album 6/6. Austen R. Walsh, writing for arts website The Arts Fuse, described Messe I.X–VI.X as "a brilliant blend of classical, dark ambient, and hard rock music." Dutch media website hifi.nl rated the album 9/10. Daniel Schnettler, writing for online Spanish webzine Noise, rated the album 10/10.

== Track listing ==
No.	Title	Length
1.	"As Syrians Pour In, Lebanon Grapples with Ghosts of a Bloody Past"	11:50
2.	"Shri Schneider"	5:34
3.	"Glamour Box (Ostinati)"	6:10
4.	"Son of Man"	8:23
5.	"Noche oscura del alma" ("Dark Night of the Soul")	5:25
6.	"Mother of Mercy"	7:22
Total length:		44:52

== Personnel ==
=== Ulver ===
- Jørn H. Sværen
- Kristoffer Rygg
- Ole Alexander Halstensgård
- Tore Ylwizaker

=== Tromsø Chamber Orchestra ===
- Cello – Inga Raab, Mario Machlik, Ørnulf Lillebjerka
- Double bass – Stein Paulsen
- Grand piano – Martin Romberg
- Trombone – Jens Christian Kloster, Torbjørn Ingvaldsen
- Trumpet – Arne Bjørhei, Ingrid Eliassen
- Viola – Katrina Brown, Mari Giske, Sigrid Lien Schulerud
- Violin (1st) – Aelita Osadchuk, Brynjar Lien Schulerud, Kristina Nygaard Walsnes, Snorre Holmgren, Yuko Kawami
- Violin (2nd) – Anders Melhus, Berit Fonnes, Eira Foss, Sari Martinussen
- Violin, viola – Kari Rønnekleiv, Ole-Henrik Moe

=== Additional musicians ===
- Drums – Tomas Pettersen
- Guitar – Alexander Kloster-Jensen
- Hurdy-gurdy – John Stenersen

=== Additional credits ===
- Cover photography – Ingrid Aas
- Design – Trine + Kim Design Studio
- Liner notes (Purgatory, Summer 2013) – Ulver
- Mastering – Jaime Gomez Arellano
- Mixing – Ulver
- Photography (video stills) – Kristin Bøyesen
- Score (scored for orchestra) – Martin Romberg
