= Perdition City =

Studio album by Ulver
- Released: 26 March 2000
- Genre: Avant-garde; electronic; trip hop; ambient; jazz
- Length: 53:31
- Label: Jester
- Producer: Ylwizaker, Audun Strype

Ulver chronology
Metamorphosis (1999)	Perdition City (2000)	Silence Teaches You How to Sing (2001)

Ulver studio album chronology
Themes from William Blake's The Marriage of Heaven and Hell (1998)	Perdition City (2000)	Blood Inside (2005)

Perdition City (subtitled Music to an Interior Film) is the fifth studio album by Norwegian experimental electronica band Ulver, issued in March 2000, via Jester Records. The album was recorded and produced by Kristoffer Rygg and Tore Ylwizaker, mixed by Ylwizaker at Beep Jam Studio and mastered by Audun Strype at Strype Audio.

Perdition City continues the experimentation heard on Themes from William Blake's The Marriage of Heaven and Hell and Metamorphosis, containing elements of trip hop, jazz, ambient music, spoken word and electronica, the combination being described as "moody", "atmospheric", and "cinematic in scope". The album received positive reviews upon release, with Kerrang! noting, "This ain't rock 'n roll. This is evolution on such a grand scale that most bands wouldn't even be able to wrap their tiny little minds around it."

== Background ==
The Metamorphosis EP, issued in September 1999, showcased Ulver's new electronic sound, delving into what would become the foundation for all future records,

Now consisting of only two members — Rygg and Ylwizaker — the duo started to incorporate field recordings into their work. During the making of Perdition City Ylwizaker would hang microphones outside the window of his 5th floor apartment to capture the sounds of the inner city streets.

Subtitled "Music to an Interior Film", Perdition City, and companion EP’s Silence Teaches You How to Sing and Silencing the Singing, represent the transition to the band's work in film scores, largely inspired by the results of electronic programming and digital sound manipulation they had experimented with during the recording of Themes from William Blake's The Marriage of Heaven and Hell. In response to the subtitle, Rygg adds, "We mean just what we say, an abstract "inner movie". It wouldn't be wise to comment on anything afterwards in case there would be a hidden message." Leonards Lair state that Perdition City is “much more than background music, which is capable of adding atmosphere to a film, but taken out of context as a standalone piece is ultimately worthless. This music is too obtrusive, and to be frank, too good for a soundtrack.“

Expanding on the photography included in the Perdition City booklet, Rygg comments, "We didn't consciously think of taking the listener into a concrete city, it's more of a metaphor and abstract. A friend of mine who has written books and taken many photographs inspired me to capture weird pictures. We then compiled the best of them to support the story the lyrics make. We tried to make an anti-aesthetic whole that would create a documentary feeling."

Printed in the sleeve note is states: "This is for the stations before and after sleep. Headphones and darkness recommended." Rygg adds, “Darkness is always fascinating, as well as the great void. It doesn’t matter under which aesthetic circumstances this void appears. It is always there and that was important for us to realize on Perdition City: the void is even over the voice. (…) It is funny you call us criminal alchemists. Indeed in our lyrics there are enough criminal and alchemical aspects, or fascinating borderline topics, to be more concrete. That all takes place in the dead city, or better: in a centre, an imagined location of nowhere and nothing.”

Rygg, commenting in Unrestrained magazine in 2007, said, "It's like I say, we only have three consistent albums. I think Nattens madrigal is one, I think Perdition City is one, and I think this new one [Shadows of the Sun]. They all sound pretty dead set. We were heavily into stuff like Amon Tobin, Warp Records, et cetera, and that certainly influenced the sound of that one." Continuing, “[Making film soundtracks] was more painstaking work than we thought. It's exciting work, but it's also more commercially orientated. You can apply your own tastes and your own vision, of course, but only to a certain extent. It always comes down to what the director and producers have in mind. And I respect that, as they are the ones with lots of money at stake. As a musician, it's an advantage if you get involved early in the process, before the editing is done because then you can cross edit sounds and images for better momentum or what have you. Whereas if the stuff is already edited, it can be difficult to get it to fit. Also, you have to learn to put your ego aside because the film itself is obviously the priority, so it's not like making an album. It's not music on its own terms. It's an underscore, aimed more at the subconscious experience. In a cinema context, you're not really supposed to listen to the music, but feel it."

== Critical reception ==
Professional ratings
Review scores
Source	Rating
Allmusic	4/5 stars
Pitchfork	2.6/10

Writing for AllMusic, William York commented positively, “Fifth album, Perdition City is an album of moody, atmospheric electronica, built up around basic down-tempo beats and noir-ish electronic piano harmonies, and then fleshed out with various blips and bleeps, static noises, samples, and occasional vocals.” Additionally, Johnathan Hill highlighted the album's "jazz-tinged" moments, noting that the "rich and varied instrumental passages" allowed for a greater level of depth to the band's musical explorations.

Conversely, David M. Pecoraro from Pitchfork rated the album 2.6/10 and declared, “Who knows? Maybe Perdition City was nothing more than a well-intentioned but ultimately ill-advised experiment for these guys. Ulver might want to consider a return to their metal roots.”

== Track listing ==
No.	Title	Length
1.	"Lost in Moments"	7:16
2.	"Porn Piece or The Scars of Cold Kisses": "Piece One"; "Piece Two"	7:09: 3:58; 3:11
3.	"Hallways of Always"	6:35
4.	"Tomorrow Never Knows"	7:59
5.	"The Future Sound of Music"	6:39
6.	"We Are the Dead"	3:40
7.	"Dead City Centres"	7:10
8.	"Catalept"	2:05
9.	"Nowhere/Catastrophe"	4:48
Total length:		53:31

"Catalept" is a remix of Prelude from the film Psycho.

== Personnel ==
Ulver

- Kristoffer Rygg - vocals (credited as "Christophorus G. Rygg"), artwork (credited as "G.")
- Tore Ylwizaker - electronic programming

Additional musicians

- Håvard Jørgensen - electric guitar
- Bård Eithun - Roland V-Drums on "The Future Sound of Music"
- Ivar H. Johansen - drums on "Nowhere/Catastrophe"
- Kåre J. Pedersen - drums on "Porn Piece (or The Scars of Cold Kisses)"
- Rolf-Erik Nystrøm - saxophone on "Lost in Moments" and "Dead City Centres"
- Øystein Moe - bass guitar on "Lost in Moments"

Other credits

- Subtopia - design
- Tore Ylwizaker - mixing
- Bård Torgersen and Esben Johansen - photography
