= Ulver =

Norwegian experimental/avant-garde band

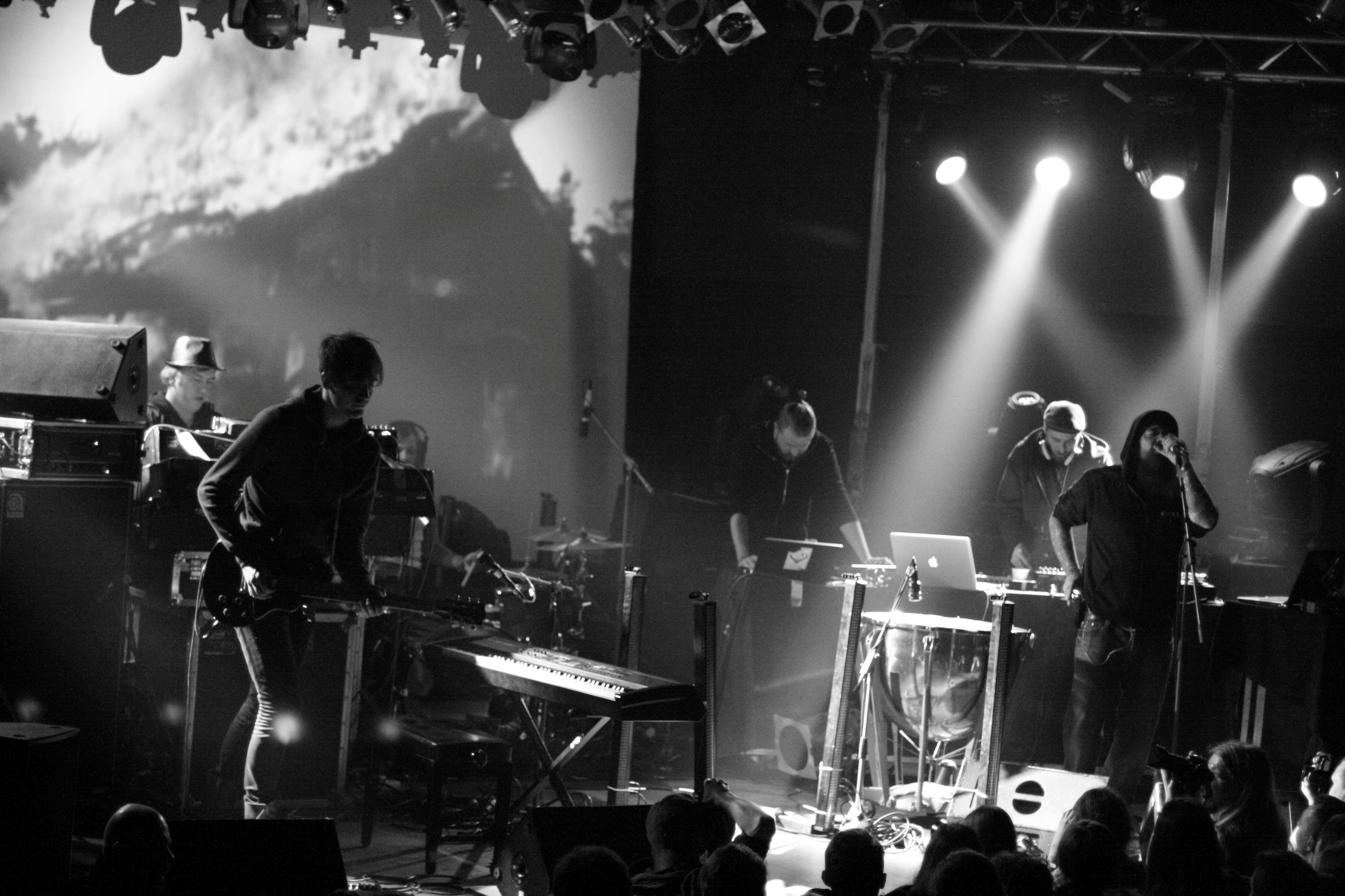
- Ulver, 22 February 2010, Kraków

Background information
- Origin: Norway
- Genres: Electronic; experimental; ambient; synth-pop; black metal (early)
- Years active: 1993–present
- Labels: Kscope; Jester; The End; Century Media; Head Not Found; House of Mythology
- Members: Kristoffer Rygg; Jørn H. Sværen
- Past members: Sigmund Andreas Løkken; Robin Malmberg; Carl-Michael Eide; Stian Thoresen; Håvard Jørgensen; Erik Olivier Lancelot; Torbjørn Heimen Pedersen; Hugh Steven James Mingay; Daniel O'Sullivan; Tore Ylwizaker
- Website: jester-records.com/ulver

Ulver (Norwegian for "wolves") is a Norwegian experimental electronic band founded in 1993, by vocalist Kristoffer Rygg. Their early works, such as debut album Bergtatt, were categorised as folklore-influenced black metal, but the band has since evolved a fluid and increasingly eclectic musical style, blending genres such as experimental rock, electronica, ambient, trip hop, symphonic and chamber traditions, noise, progressive and experimental music into their oeuvre. 1997 marked their international debut with the release of their third album Nattens madrigal through German label Century Media. However, following discord with the label, Rygg formed his own imprint, Jester Records, in 1998.

In 1997, Rygg invited composer and multi-instrumentalist Tore Ylwizaker into the band, and together they changed Ulver's musical direction. Their first musical endeavour together, Themes from William Blake's The Marriage of Heaven and Hell, drew from a variety of non-metal sources, including classical and avant-garde, and the works of William Blake. Metamorphosis (1999) and Perdition City (2000) followed, showcasing further experimentation and explorations into electronic music. In 2000, author Jørn H. Sværen joined the band, and since then, the core of Ulver has been Rygg, Ylwizaker and Sværen. In 2009, Ulver expanded their line-up: British multi-instrumentalist Daniel O'Sullivan became the fourth core member, and several other musicians were enlisted as supporting and live members; of the latter, Norwegian musician and producer Ole Alexander Halstensgård has since established himself as another prominent member of the band.

Ulver has performed at several prestigious venues, including Queen Elizabeth Hall (2009), the Norwegian National Opera and Ballet (2010), Teatro Regio di Parma (2013), Labirinto della Masone di Franco Maria Ricci (2017) and held artist residency at Henie Onstad Kunstsenter (2018).

The band have sold in excess of half a million records, been thrice nominated for the Norwegian Grammy Awards, Spellemannsprisen, in different categories, won Album of the Year at the Oslo Awards for Shadows of the Sun in 2008, won the NATT&DAG award for Best Live Act in 2011, and earned a global reputation for stylistic unpredictability.

Author and musician Julian Cope has said, "Ulver are cataloguing the death of our culture two decades before anyone else has noticed its inevitable demise."

== History ==
=== The Black Metal Trilogie (1993–1997) ===
The band was founded in 1993 in Oslo by vocalist Kristoffer Rygg together with Grellmund, Robin Malmberg, Carl-Michael Eide, Håvard Jørgensen, and A. Reza. Ulver issued their first demo cassette, Vargnatt, in November 1993. Their music and style was consistent with the Norwegian black metal subculture of the early 1990s. However some have noted the avant-garde, jazz, rock and gothic influences that would later shape the band's sound. The archaic Dano-Norwegian lyrics were greatly influenced by Scandinavian folktales and inspired by Baroque poets such as Ludvig Holberg and the hymn-writer Thomas Kingo.

Their debut album, Bergtatt, the first part of what has become known as Ulver's "Black Metal Trilogie", was issued in February 1995 through Norwegian label Head Not Found. The album was met with critical acclaim, and was notable for blending black metal, harsh vocals and blurred, buzzing guitars with quiet, folk-like acoustic passages. It was praised for its unique atmosphere and was described as "mysterious, melancholic, eerie, and oddly tranquil."

Prior to their second album, founding member Grellmund committed suicide on New Year’s Day 1996 at the age of 19. Kveldssanger, issued March 1996 by Head Not Found, Ulver eschewed a typical black metal sound by incorporating classical guitars, cello and choral chamber chants overlaid with subtle orchestral landscapes. The album was a drastic contrast to Bergtatt, whilst still retaining the atmospheric and folk themes. Rygg has since remarked that Kveldssanger, despite strong content, was an "immature attempt at making a classical album". The album was praised for its atmosphere, evoking a feeling of quiet, eerie solitude.

Following the success of their first two albums, Ulver signed with German label Century Media for their third album Nattens madrigal, issued in March 1997, marking the band's international debut. The album showcases a black metal style similar to Bergtatt, abandoning the acoustic and atmospheric elements of Kveldssanger, with an intentionally underproduced sound. The album has been described as "raw and grim black metal at its blackest." A common myth about the album is that the band spent the recording budget on Armani suits, cocaine and a Corvette; and recorded the album outdoors in a Norwegian forest on an 8-track recorder. Rygg, however, has stated that this is not true, and possibly a rumour started by Century Media. The album has been described as "so fast and ferocious and the vocals so garbled that it's best just to take the sheer sonic force as reflecting the band's concept, rather than trying to piece it all together."

Metal Injection concluded "Kveldssanger had no electric instruments, Nattens madrigal had no acoustic instruments, but Bergtatt, has both acoustic and electric instruments; it's like they spliced the elements from Bergtatt into two separate albums. If that's the case, then Nattens madrigal really showcases the black metal prowess of the band. The album answers exactly why people were so angered by Ulver's transition away from black metal, and why people are still bitter at their direction today."

In 1997, Century Media issued The Trilogie – Three Journeyes Through the Norwegian Netherworlde, a limited edition collection, containing Bergtatt, Kveldssanger and Nattens madrigal in LP Picture Disc format, housed in a cardboard box, with a booklet and bonus posters.

=== Beyond black metal (1998–2002) ===
In 1997, Rygg invited composer and sound architect Tore Ylwizaker into the collective in order to expand their artistic and musical visions; and together they stepped over the boundaries of black metal aesthetics, creating a genre-defying work in Themes from William Blake's The Marriage of Heaven and Hell, released in December 1998. The album was issued through Rygg's own imprint, Jester Records, a label born out of discord between Ulver and Century Media. Musically, the album blended electronics, industrial music elements, progressive metal and experimental rock, adding ambient passages. Lyrically, the album incorporates the entire text of William Blake's The Marriage of Heaven and Hell, utilising guest vocalists on several songs. The album received widespread acclaim from critics within both the rock/metal and alternative music press - being awarded "album of the month" in several high-profile magazines such as Terrorizer, Metal Hammer, and Rock Hard and ranked highly in their end of year's best polls. However, the album's transitional nature perhaps alienated many fans of the band's first three albums — causing a backlash from the black metal scene.

Ulver, now only consisting of Rygg and Ylwizaker, issued an EP, Metamorphosis, in September 1999. The music moving to the more heavily electronic approach, bridging the gap to the film-noir ambiance of 2000's full-length album Perdition City. In the sleeve notes to Metamorphosis, the group declared:

Ulver is obviously not a black metal band and does not wish to be stigmatized as such. We acknowledge the relation of part I & III of the Trilogie (Bergtatt & Nattens Madrigal) to this culture, but stress that these endeavours were written as stepping stones rather than conclusions. We are proud of our former instincts, but wish to liken our association with said genre to that of the snake with Eve. An incentive to further frolic only. If this discourages you in any way, please have the courtesy to refrain from voicing superficial remarks regarding our music and/or personae. We are as unknown to you as we always were.

Perdition City, issued in March 2000, was described as moody, atmospheric electronica, cinematic in scope, evoking a soundtrack for an imaginary film. Kerrang! praised the album, ranking it top ten that year, noting "This ain't rock 'n roll. This is evolution on such a grand scale that most bands wouldn't even be able to wrap their tiny little minds around it." Musically, Ulver not only explores new genres, but also shift from extrovert, into more introverted moods, or interior music.

Later that year, Jørn H. Sværen joined the band. The band followed up Perdition City with two improv/minimalist/ambient/glitch companion EPs, called Silence Teaches You How to Sing and Silencing the Singing, in September and December 2001, respectively. The material featured here was loosely recorded during the sessions for the Perdition City album. The style is more experimental/atmospheric and less beat-oriented; rather mood pieces that revolve around the Perdition City theme. Due to the experimental nature of the music, both Silence EPs were limited to two thousand, and three thousand copies. However, both EPs were re-released as one disc, under the title Teachings in Silence, in November 2002.

Ulver, now with more confidence in their ambient sensibilities descent into the world of film soundtracks, producing scores for Lyckantropen (issued as Lyckantropen Themes, in November 2002), Svidd neger (issued as Svidd neger, in September 2003) and a joint soundtrack with singer/songwriter Tom McRae for the multiple award-winning Uno. Ulver were praised for their soundtrack work, and their ability to adapt and providing a sense of continuity to each film. The song "Silence Teaches You How to Sing" was later used in the 2012 supernatural horror film Sinister. Another song, "Not Saved", was used for the sequel Sinister 2.

Ulver celebrated their ten-year anniversary with a remix album, 1993–2003: 1st Decade in the Machines, issued in April 2003, featuring contributions from Third Eye Foundation, Bogdan Raczynski, Fennesz, V/Vm and Merzbow among others.

In 2002, the trio announced that they were working on a string remake of Nattens madrigal, but Rygg later stated that the project "is in a state of total dormancy."

=== Blood Inside and Shadows of the Sun (2003–2008) ===
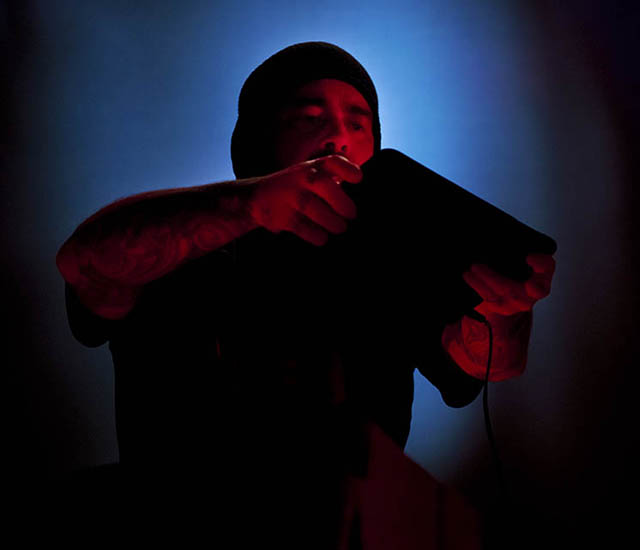
Ulver, live in London 2011

In August 2003, Ulver issued an EP, A Quick Fix of Melancholy, essentially a teaser for the forthcoming album, Blood Inside. A delicate marriage of orchestration and electronica the EP features text by Christian Bök and a remix of a song from Kveldssanger.

In 2004, the group collaborated with Sámi vocalist Mari Boine and percussionist Marilyn Mazur to score Mona J. Hoel's film Salto, salmiakk og kaffe. The film premiered in August 2004, however, the soundtrack remains unreleased.

Ulver issued Blood Inside in June 2005, produced together with King Crimson collaborator Ronan Chris Murphy. The album returns to more classical arrangements and instrumentation, described as "a beautifully crafted album of both substance and style. Certainly, Blood Inside is still not for everyone, but those who choose to indulge in this will find themselves rewarded on every level." "[Blood Inside] is ambiguous and full of intricate layers and influences working to tell a story that is both haunting and mesmerising. Garm's beautiful distorted vocals act as outcries of a desperate man hidden, pushed in the background of the story that the instrumentation tells." Webzine Avantgarde-metal.com concludes: "the sound of the album is maybe their most extravagant, extrovert, dynamic and wild, ranging from swing band to danceable hard electronic pop, with a lot of peaceful moments in between so much energy."

Ulver and drone metal band Sunn O))) collaborated on the fifteen-minute track "CUT WOODeD" - a tribute to the deceased film director Ed Wood, which later appeared on Sunn O)))'s WHITEbox box set, issued in July 2006.

Shadows of the Sun was issued in October 2007 in Europe and the United States and would include collaborations with artists Pamelia Kurstin contributing theremin, Mathias Eick on trumpet and Christian Fennesz, adding supplemental shimmer. Rygg described it as "our most personal record to date." Described as "low-key, dark and tragic," the album received critical acclaim, and in February 2008 the album won the Oslo Awards for Album of the Year, in 2008. The album was also voted best album of 2007 at the website Sonic Frontiers.

=== Changes in personnel (2009–2012) ===
In 2009, Ulver announced it would become a quartet. Its three extant members — Kristoffer Rygg, Tore Ylwizaker and Jørn H. Sværen — enlisted British composer and multi-instrumentalist Daniel O'Sullivan (Æthenor, Guapo, Mothlite) into the collective. Ole Alexander Halstensgård was another prominent musician to be included in the live-act.

The band accepted an invitation to appear at the Norwegian Festival of Literature, at Maihaugsalen (part of Maihaugen) in Lillehammer, Norway on 30 May 2009. The collective were accompanied by guest musicians Lars Pedersen (aka When) on drums, Pamelia Kurstin playing Theremin and Halstensgård (a founding member of Norwegian group Paperboys). The success of this performance lead to them embarking on a string of other live performances in 2009 and 2010, selling out prestigious venues, such as the Queen Elizabeth Hall in London, Volksbühne in Berlin and La Cigale in Paris before they returned to their homeland for their performance at The Norwegian Opera House. Ulver were the first band outside the established Norwegian music scene to be invited to play at the Opera House.

The first album to feature the quartet is Wars of the Roses, issued in April 2011 via Kscope, preceded by a single, "February MMX," in February. The album entered the Norwegian National Album Charts at Number 17. SputnikMusic noted, "Wars of the Roses' thoughtful conception and execution serves only for a thoughtful listen. After all this time, it still remains a privilege to bear witness to these wolves evolve once again." Murat Batmaz, commenting for Sea of Tranquility webzine, noted, "it amalgamates musical traits from its predecessors while re-shaping them with a more direct approach."

In November 2011, Kscope released The Norwegian National Opera, a film documenting Ulver's performance at The Norwegian National Opera on 31 July 2010. Described as "mesmerizing and stunningly beautiful" and "a unique and at times hypnotic live experience; far from a conventional one; more akin to a piece of performance art than a standard concert."

Ulver's next project, Childhood's End came in the form of a collection of covers of "60s psychedelic chestnuts", issued on Jester Records, under license to Kscope, in May 2012. The album, a reinterpretation of '60s psychedelia, was intended by Ulver as a reflection on lost innocence. The album received favourable reviews; Ben Ratliffe, writing for The New York Times, praised Childhood's End for its treatment of the original music, commenting that "these cover versions reward the ambition of the original songs, draping them with stateliness." Placing the album in the context of Ulver's discography, Ratliffe noted that Childhood's End is "the most straight-ahead Ulver record ever, but still strange". A music video for "Magic Hollow", directed by Justin Oakey, was released in April 2012.

In 2012, Roadburn Records issued an installment in their Roadburn EP series on 7″ vinyl, featuring the songs "I Had Too Much To Dream (Last Night)" b/w "Reverberation (Doubt)." Limited to 500 copies, of which 100 copies is gold vinyl - the release commemorated Ulver's performance at the Roadburn Festival, 013, Tilburg, in the Netherlands, on 12 April 2012. The full performance at the festival was issued as Live at Roadburn in June 2013 via Roadburn Records. It was the first and only time tracks from Childhood's End were performed live.

Announcing a new DIY approach, Ulver released a press statement, The Art of Dying, an articulated rant about the changes in the record industry. The band collected some covers and curiosities, and made them available to download as Oddities & Rarities#1, including material from tribute albums and the Uno soundtrack.

=== Messe I.X–VI.X (2012–2015) ===
Ulver were commissioned in 2012 by the Tromsø Kulturhus (House of Culture) in Norway, in a cooperation with the Arctic Opera and Philharmonic Orchestra cultural institution to compose and perform a Mass. With additional aid and advice from composer Martin Romberg, and contemporary composers/musicians Ole-Henrik Moe and Kari Rønnekleiv, Messe I.X–VI.X was composed and first performed live by Ulver, alongside the Tromsø Chamber Orchestra on 21 September 2012. The band then took the recordings back to Crystal Canyon, Oslo and spent winter and spring in post-production, honing the material for its studio-equivalent. Issued in August 2013, Ulver's tenth studio album received universal critical acclaim, described as "a challenging work and an album of rare beauty".

In January 2014, Ulver collaborated with Norway's National Theatre, providing the soundtrack to Demoner 2014 (translated Demons 2014); based on a text by Geir Gulliksen, in turn freely based on the Dostoyevsky novel Demons (also known as The Possessed), the play premiered on 8 February 2014.

On 2 January 2014, Ulver announced an 11-date European tour, "the February dates will consist of partly new and improv-based material, likely to revolve around motifs already familiar to our familiars. We are looking forward to get out there, and hope for some interesting music to be born those evenings and nights. We also aim to document some of it for those of you who cannot come."

Ulver released a collaboration album with Sunn O))), entitled Terrestrials, issued in February 2014 via Southern Lord. Produced by Rygg and Stephen O'Malley, it has been described as "three live improvisation pieces". On 10 December 2013, a sample from the closing track, "Eternal Return," was released for streaming. It was also streamed on Pitchfork Advance on the day it was released, until 10 February 2014.

In April 2014, Century Media announced Trolsk Sortmetall 1993-1997, collecting together the albums Bergtatt, Kveldssanger and Nattens madrigal, as well as the band's original demo cassette, Vargnatt, and other rarities.

In July 2014, Ulver contributed a cover of Shirley Collins' "Poor Murdered Woman" in support of Burning Bridges & Fifth Column Film's project The Ballad of Shirley Collins. A film, book and tribute album honouring the life and work of this musical pioneer and folk legend.

On 3 June 2015 on the band's official website, in a statement titled Only Theatre of Pain, Ulver announce a number of forthcoming projects; including Messe in Concert at the distinguished Teatro Regio, Parma, Italy, 16 November 2013, with the Mg_Inc Orchestra. A live document of their concert featuring Pamelia Kurstin, including 15 minutes of new music written and performed specifically for the scene and topped up with full orchestra versions of "Little Blue Bird" and "Eos". They continue to announce their newest works, tentatively titled The Assassination of Julius Caesar, with texts and themes in development.

=== ATGCLVLSSCAP, Riverhead and The Assassination of Julius Caesar (2015–2019) ===
On 15 October 2015, in an interview with website Steel for Brains, Ulver announced ATGCLVLSSCAP, a double album with over 80 minutes worth of material, consisting of multitracked and studio-enhanced live, mostly improvisational, rock and electronic soundscapes, 2/3 of which had never been heard before. Announcing further details on 28 October, the album was released on 22 January 2016 on Vinyl and CD formats via newly formed, London-based label House of Mythology. The basis for the album – which the band worked on under the moniker 12 – arrives from recordings made at twelve different live shows that Ulver performed in February 2014, in which the band played a set improvisatory "free rock" performances. Band member Daniel O'Sullivan took the multitrack recordings, sculpting and editing hours of material in his North London home, before Anders Møller, Kristoffer Rygg and Tore Ylwizaker got involved, completing the recordings at Subsonic Society and Oak Hill Studios, Oslo.

In 2016, the band composed the score for the Canadian drama film Riverhead. In October, a new studio album, The Assassination of Julius Caesar was announced to be released on 7 April as well as a performance at the 2017 edition of Roadburn Festival. A string of festival dates were subsequently added. The album showed the band switching directions in terms of musical styles once again, focusing on a sound that was described by AllMusic critic Thom Jurek as "drenched in moody '80s synth pop." On 11 November 2017, Ulver released Sic Transit Gloria Mundi, a 3-track EP with two songs taken from The Assassination of Julius Caesar recording sessions, and a Frankie Goes to Hollywood cover, "The Power of Love".

=== Drone Activity, Flowers of Evil, and Scary Muzak (2019–present) ===
On 1 March, Ulver shared a short excerpt of music, titled "Blood, Fire, Woods, Diamonds", on their Facebook page. Two days later, they announced a new live album, titled Drone Activity, consisting of four new pieces of live music edited in studio following a process reminiscent of the one used of ATGCLVLSSCAP. On 4 April, the band shared a second excerpt from the album, titled "Twenty Thousand Leagues Under the Sea". The album was released on 11 May 2019.

Ulver announced their plans for 2020 through Norwegian publication Ballade on 17 October 2019: "Ulver is working on a new album, planned to be released in 2020. (...) The Norwegian cult band is also preparing a retrospective book about the band's history through the 1990s and up until today." A European tour was scheduled for May 2020, however, it was postponed due to COVID-19 pandemic. In June 2020, Flowers of Evil was announced and was released on 28 August through House of Mythology. The singles "Russian Doll", "Little Boy" and "Nostalgia" were released in advance. On the same day, Wolves Evolve: The Ulver Story, a limited edition book written by Tore Engelsen Espedal, Phil Alexander, Nile Bowie and Torolf Kroglund and detailing the band's history, was released as well.

Ulver released their thirteenth album Scary Muzak on 31 October 2021. Five of the twelve songs on Scary Muzak are covers from the soundtrack to John Carpenter's 1978 Halloween.

On 19 August 2024, Ulver announced through their social media that long-time member Tore Ylwizaker had died three days earlier, on 16 August, his 54th birthday.

== Accolades ==
| Year | Award | Category | Result |
|---|---|---|---|
| 2002 | Spellemannprisen | Best Open Class Album for Lyckantropen Themes | Nominated |
| 2003 | Spellemannprisen | Best Electronic Album for Teachings in Silence | Nominated |
| 2007 | Oslo Awards | Album of the Year for Shadows of the Sun | Won |
| 2011 | NATT&DAG | Best Live Act | Won |
| 2022 | Spellemannprisen | Best Open Class Album for Scary Muzak | Nominated |

== Live appearances ==
=== At the Norwegian Festival of Literature ===
On 30 May 2009 Ulver performed live for the first time in 15 years at Maihaugsalen (part of Maihaugen) in Lillehammer, Norway. The concert was a part of the Norwegian Festival of Literature. The three band members were accompanied by guest musicians: Lars Pedersen (aka When) on drums, Daniel O'Sullivan (also in Æthenor, Guapo, Mothlite) on guitar and bass, Pamelia Kurstin playing theremin and Ole Aleksander Halstensgård (from Paperboys).

Subsequently, the only live appearances outside Norway were held at the Brutal Assault Festival in the Czech Republic on 7 August and at the Gagarin205 club in Athens, Greece (16 November). More festival appearances in Norway were announced: Øyafestivalen at Middelalderparken, Oslo (11 August), Møllafestivalen in Gjerstad (14 August), Pstereo '09 at Marinen, Trondheim (21 August) and London's Queen Elizabeth Hall (9 October).

=== Ulver at the Opera ===
On 31 July 2010 Ulver performed live at the Norwegian National Opera and Ballet with Christian Fennesz and the performance artist Ian Johnstone.

=== Wars of the Roses Tour ===
From 22 March 2011 to 21 April, Ulver played in several European countries to support their 2011 album Wars of the Roses. On this tour they performed said album in its entirety, and also added some abstract/improvised passages. Zweizz supported these shows.

=== Messe I.X–VI.X performances ===
Following its original performance at Tromsø Kulturhus in Tromsø, Norway, with Tromsø Chamber Orchestra, on 21 September 2012, Ulver have performed Messe I.X–VI.X in its entirety a further three times: On 20 May 2013 at Wave-Gotik-Treffen, Leipzig, Germany with the Stüba Philharmonie, Volkspalast and on 16 November 2013 at Teatro Regio, Parma, Italy with the MG_INC Orchestra and at the Dark MOFO festival, 17 June 2017, in Hobart, Australia, the orchestras being conducted by composer Martin Romberg.

=== The Assassination of Julius Caesar performances ===
In the wake of the release of The Assassination of Julius Caesar, Ulver played a few concerts in Europe, and gave their first two shows in Australia. In November, they toured Europe, playing their last album in its entirety, only adding a few songs from their Sic Transit Gloria Mundi EP released shortly before the beginning of the tour. Stian Westerhus was their opening act, promoting its solo album Amputation, and supporting Ulver on stage as a guitarist during some songs he played on the last Ulver's release.

=== First North American performances ===
On 21 and 22 March 2019, Ulver played at Irving Plaza in New York City, their first North American shows ever. It was described by Kerrang! as "New York's ultimate goth night". A return to the United States was cancelled when Ulver announced that pre-sale tickets were "too modest" up against the "big risk" of touring with their production in the US.

== Members ==
=== Current members ===
- Kristoffer Rygg – vocals, additional programming, e-percussion (1993–present)
- Jørn H. Sværen – miscellaneous (2000–present)
- Ole Aleksander Halstensgård – electronics, e-percussion (2017–present; live musician 2009–2017)

=== Supporting members ===
- Lars Pedersen – drums, percussion (2009–present)
- Pamelia Kurstin – theremin (2009–present)
- Ivar Thormodsæter – drums (2015–present)
- Anders Møller – percussion (2016–present)
- Stian Westerhus – guitar (2017–present)

=== Former members ===
Guitars

- Sigmund Andreas "Grellmund" Løkken (1993; died 1996)
- Håvard "Lemarchand" Jørgensen (1993–1999)
- Stian "Shagrath" Thoresen (1994)
- Torbjørn Heimen Pedersen (Aismal) (1994–1997)
- Knut Magne Valle (1998)
- Daniel O'Sullivan – guitar, bass, keyboards (core member 2009–2016, supporting member 2016–2017)

Bass guitar

- Robin "Mean" Malmberg (1993)
- Hugh Steven James Mingay (1994–1998)

Drums

- Carl-Michael "Czral" Eide (1993)
- Erik Olivier "AiwarikiaR" Lancelot (1994–1998)

Keyboards

- Håvard "Lemarchand" Jørgensen (1993–1999)
- Torbjørn "Aismal" Pedersen (1994–1997)
- Tore Ylwizaker – keyboards, programming (1998–2024; died 2024)

Flute

- Erik Olivier "AiwarikiaR" Lancelot (1994–1998)

== Discography ==
- Bergtatt – Et eeventyr i 5 capitler (1995)
- Kveldssanger (1996)
- Nattens madrigal (1997)
- Themes from William Blake's The Marriage of Heaven and Hell (1998)
- Perdition City (2000)
- Blood Inside (2005)
- Shadows of the Sun (2007)
- Wars of the Roses (2011)
- Messe I.X–VI.X (2013)
- ATGCLVLSSCAP (2016)
- The Assassination of Julius Caesar (2017)
- Flowers of Evil (2020)
- Scary Muzak (2021)
- Liminal Animals (2024)
- Neverland (2025)
