= Jester Records =

Record label

Jester Records is a record label founded in 1998 by Kristoffer Rygg (also known as Garm, Trickster G, G. Wolf and Fiery G. Maelstrom) after conflicts between his band Ulver and their German/American label Century Media Records.

== Artists ==
- 1349 Rykkinn
- Arcturus
- Bogus Blimp
- Anthony Curtis
- Espen Jørgensen
- Esperanza
- Head Control System
- Kåre João
- Origami Galaktika
- Rotoscope
- Single Unit
- Star of Ash
- Ulver
- Upland
- Virus
- When
- Zweizz & Joey Hopkins

== See also ==
- List of record labels
