= Virus (Norwegian band) =

Norwegian avant-garde metal band

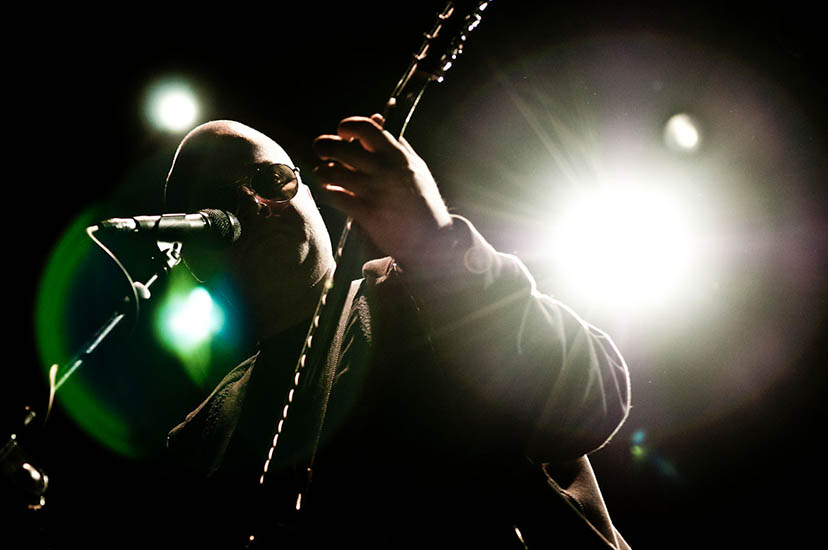
- Virus live in London 2011

Background information
- Origin: Oslo, Norway
- Genres: Avant-garde metal
- Years active: 2000–2018
- Labels: Jester, Season of Mist
- Members: Czral; Esso; Bjeima; Plenum

Virus was a Norwegian avant-garde metal band signed to Jester Records. It was formed in 2000 by Carl-Michael Eide. Czral considered the band a continuation of his previous band Ved Buens Ende because of similar musical elements and an avant garde form of unusual experimentation, although the band had its own characteristic sound.

== History ==
Virus released their debut, Carheart, in August 2003. The band released their second album The Black Flux on November 10, 2008 through Season of Mist. A third album, The Agent That Shapes the Desert, was released in February 2011. An EP, Oblivion Clock, was released on 1 December 2012. The fourth and final album, Memento Collider, was released on June 3, 2016. The band announced their breakup via Facebook on November 13, 2018.

== Band members ==
- Czral (Carl-Michael Eide) - Guitars, Vocals (see also Ved Buens Ende, Aura Noir, Dødheimsgard, Cadaver, Infernö, Satyricon)
- Plenum (Petter Berntsen) - Bass (see also Audiopain)
- Esso/Einz (Einar Sjurso) - Drums (see also Lamented Souls, Beyond Dawn, Infernö)

== Discography ==
- Carheart (2003)
- The Black Flux (2008)
- The Agent That Shapes the Desert (2011)
- Oblivion Clock (EP; 2012)
- Memento Collider (2016)
- Investigator (EP; 2017)
