= Infernö =

- Origin: Norway
- Genres: Blackened thrash metal
- Years active: 1995–present
- Labels: Duplicate

Infernö is a Norwegian thrash metal band. They formed in 1995, and are currently signed to Duplicate Records. The band's most known member is Carl-Michael "Aggressor" Eide. He has been a member of Cadaver, Dødheimsgard, Satyricon, Ulver and Ved Buens Ende. He is also a member of Aura Noir and Virus.

== Band members ==
Current members

- Hazardous Pussy Desecrator - vocals
- Bestial Tormentor (Olav Knutsen) - bass (Böh, Demon Cleaner, Lamented Souls)
- Necrodevil (Einar Sjursø) - drums (Beyond Dawn, Lamented Souls, Virus (Nor))

=== Past members ===
- Aggressor (Carl-Michael Eide) - guitars (Cadaver, Dødheimsgard, Satyricon, Ulver, Ved Buens Ende, Aura Noir and Virus)

== Discography ==
=== Studio releases ===
- Utter Hell, 1996
- Downtown Hades, 1997
- Thrash Metal Dogs of Hell, (Single) 2004

=== Demos ===
- Massacre in Hell, 1995

=== Split albums ===
- Headbangers against disco vol. 1, 1997
- Überthrash, 2004. 4-way split with Audiopain, Aura Noir and Nocturnal Breed.
- Überthrash II, 2005. 4-way split with Audiopain, Aura Noir and Nocturnal Breed.
