= Supervillain Outcast =

Studio album by Dødheimsgard
- Released: March 26, 2007
- Genre: Industrial metal, avant-garde metal, black metal
- Length: 64:32
- Label: Moonfog Productions
- Producer: Vicotnik

Dødheimsgard chronology
666 International (1999)	Supervillain Outcast (2007)	A Umbra Omega (2015)

Professional ratings
Review scores
Source	Rating
Allmusic	3.5/5 stars
Global Domination	10/10 stars
Metal Invader	5/6 stars
Pub.tv2.no	6/6 stars

Supervillain Outcast is the fourth full-length album by Norwegian black metal band Dødheimsgard, now under the moniker DHG. It was released on March 26, 2007, by Moonfog Productions. It was their only release to feature Kvohst on vocals, who replaced Aldrahn after he left the band in 2004.

With this album, the band continues the avant-garde/black metal fusion sound they undertook on their previous album, 666 International; however, the industrial-esque style that was preponderant on 666 International is toned down in order to focus more on the electronic interludes, in a style closer to DHG's EP Satanic Art (1998).

Carl-Michael Eide recorded the drums for the album prior to an accident that left his legs paralyzed.

A double-disc deluxe edition of Supervillain Outcast was released by Peaceville Records in 2012. The extra disc contained seven previously unreleased instrumental tracks; "Senseoffender" is an outtake from the album, and the following six tracks are from a 2003 rehearsal.

Aldrahn briefly returns on this album, providing additional vocals for the tracks "Foe vs. Foe" and "Ghostforce Soul Constrictor".

== Track listing ==
All tracks are written by Kvohst and Vicotnik, except where noted

No.	Title	Length
1.	"Dushman" (Instrumental)	0:56
2.	"Vendetta Assassin"	4:31
3.	"The Snuff Dreams Are Made Of"	4:55
4.	"Horrorizon"	4:01
5.	"Foe vs. Foe"	4:09
6.	"Secret Identity" (Instrumental)	1:13
7.	"The Vile Delinquents"	4:18
8.	"Unaltered Beast"	4:37
9.	"Apocalypticism"	5:02
10.	"Chrome Balaclava" (Instrumental)	1:39
11.	"Ghostforce Soul Constrictor" (Aldrahn, Vicotnik)	4:12
12.	"All Is Not Self"	5:55
13.	"Supervillain Serum"	4:22
14.	"Cellar Door" (Instrumental)	0:53
15.	"21st-Century Devil"	5:37
Total length:		1:04:31

Peaceville Records 2012 Deluxe Reissue, Bonus Disc
No.	Title	Length
1.	"Senseoffender (Outtake)" (Instrumental)	7:04
2.	"Personality Transplant" (Instrumental)	5:22
3.	"Teenanger" (Instrumental)	4:59
4.	"Deception Enemy" (Instrumental)	3:34
5.	"Satanatomic Evolution" (Instrumental)	5:43
6.	"Slave 66" (Instrumental)	6:03
7.	"Addicted to Perdition" (Instrumental)	5:28
Total length:		30:29

== Personnel ==
=== DHG ===
- Kvohst (Mathew McNerney) – Vocals
- Clandestine (Christian Eidskrem) – Bass
- Thrawn Hellspawn (Tom Kvålsvoll) – Guitars, Additional Vocals (7, 8, 13)
- Vicotnik (Yusaf Parvez) – Guitars, Samples, Programming, Additional Vocals (4, 8, 13)

=== Additional personnel ===
- Bliss – Programming
- Czral (Carl-Michael Eide) – Drums, Percussion
- Mort – Samples, Programming
- Amok (Amoque Von Berlevaag) – Backing Vocals (13)
- Aort (Andy McIvor) – Performer (1)
- Aldrahn (Bjørn Dencker Gjerde) – Additional Vocals (5, 11)
- Henning Bortne – Production
- Kim Sølve – Artwork, Design
- Trine Paulsen – Artwork
