= Ole Moe =

Norwegian musician (born 1974)

Apollyon
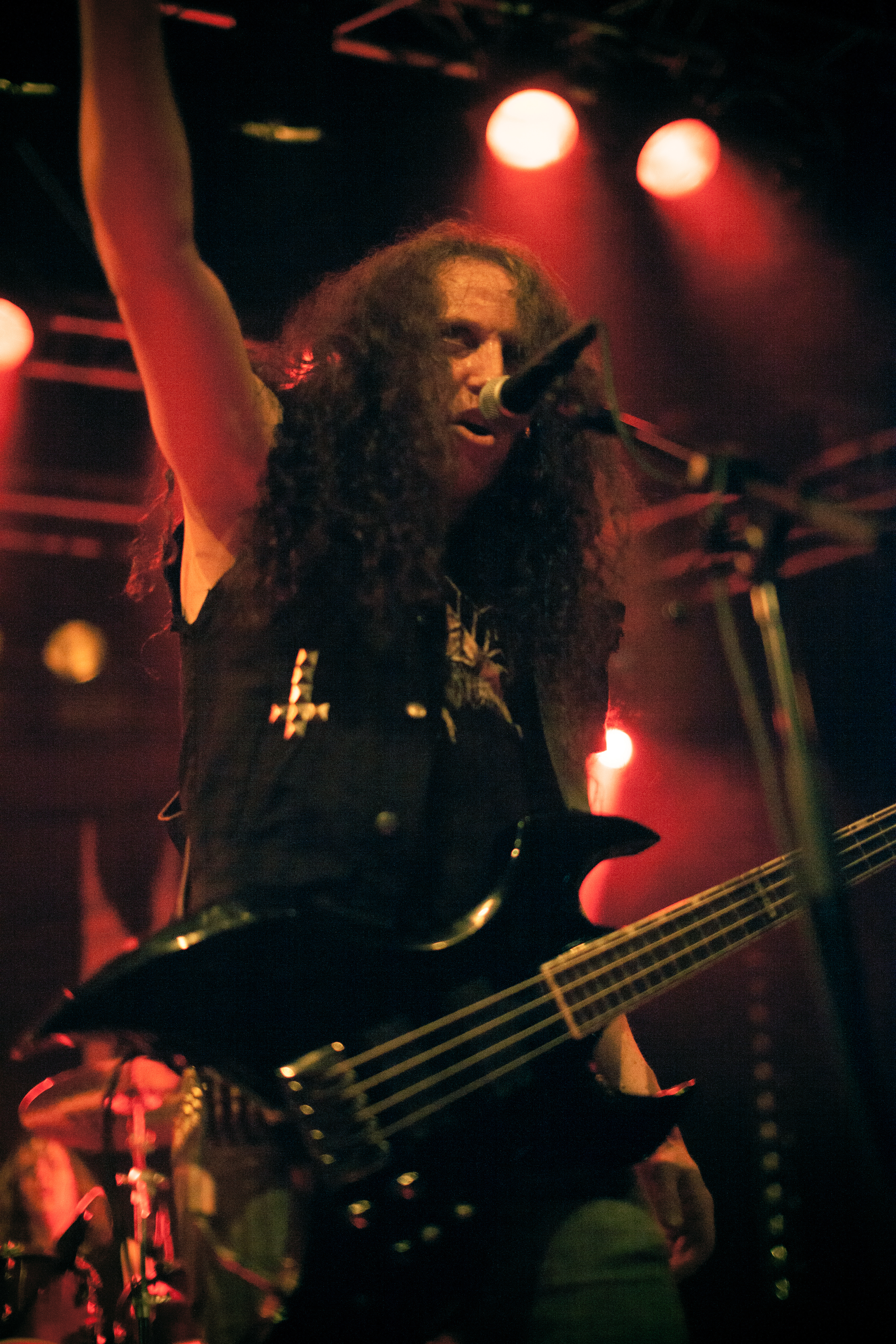
- Apollyon live with Aura Noir in 2012

Background information
- Born: Ole Jørgen Moe; 1 April 1974 (age 52)
- Origin: Norway
- Genres: Black metal, thrash metal
- Instruments: Guitar, bass guitar, vocals, drums
- Member of: Aura Noir; Two Trains; Coffin Storm
- Formerly of: Cadaver; Cadaver Inc; Dødheimsgard; Immortal; Lamented Souls; Waklevören

Apollyon (born as Ole Jørgen Moe) is a black metal/thrash metal multi-instrumentalist, formerly associated with Dødheimsgard, Cadaver and Immortal, now playing in Aura Noir. He has done guest vocals on the Darkthrone albums Plaguewielder and Sardonic Wrath, and also on Audiopain's EP 1986 (2000). He was a live guitarist for Gorgoroth from 2003 to 2004, and performed at Gorgoroth's infamous Kraków show in February 2004 and later released on the video album Black Mass Krakow 2004.

In 2004, Apollyon participated in a live tribute to Quorthon of Bathory at the Hole in the Sky festival in Bergen, Norway. Apollyon played bass on all songs, and also did the vocals on the song Equimanthorn. In addition to Apollyon, the line-up of this tribute band consisted of Bård Faust (ex-Emperor) on drums and Ivar Bjørnson (Enslaved) and Samoth (Emperor) on guitars, as well as guest vocalists Gaahl (Gorgoroth), Abbath (Immortal), Grutle Kjellson (Enslaved), Nocturno Culto (Darkthrone) and Satyr (Satyricon).

== Bands ==
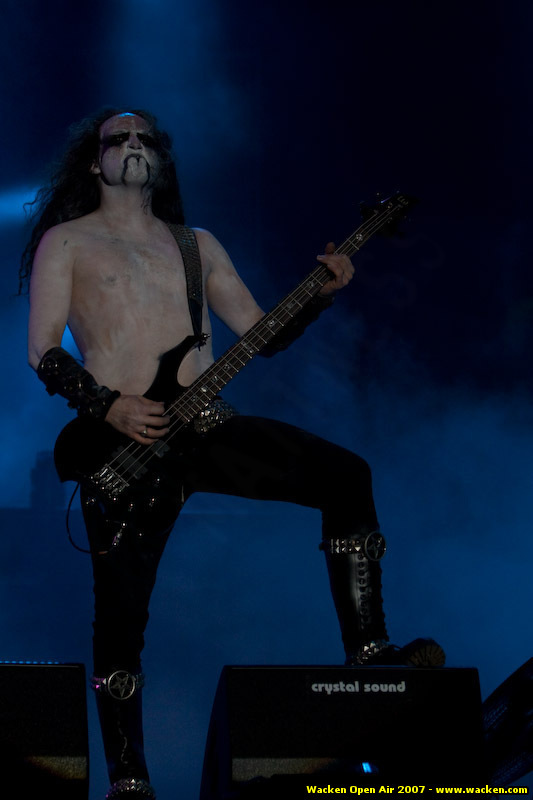
Apollyon with Immortal at Wacken Open Air 2007.

=== Current ===
- Aura Noir (vocals, guitar, bass, drums)
- Two Trains (guitar)
- Coffin Storm (drums)

=== Former ===
- Cadaver (vocals, bass guitar)
- Cadaver Inc (vocals, bass guitar)
- Dødheimsgard (guitar, vocals, bass, drums)
- Immortal (bass guitar)
- Lamented Souls (vocals, guitar, drums)
- Waklevören (drums, vocals)

=== Former live/guest/session appearances ===
- Darkthrone

2001 - Plaguewielder (additional vocals on "Command") 2004 - Sardonic Wrath (additional vocals on "Hate is the Law") 2010 - Circle the Wagons (choirs)

- Gorgoroth

2008 - Black Mass Kraków 2004 DVD (guitars)

- Naer Mataron

2005 - Discipline Manifesto (lead guitars on "Land of Dreams")

- Obliteration

2005 - Total Fucking Obliteration EP (backing vocals on tracks 3, 4)

- Secht

2006 - Secht (vocals)

- Whiskey Ritual

2010 - In Goat We Trust (vocals on "One Million")

== Discography ==
=== Aura Noir ===
- Two Voices One King (unreleased demo) (1994)
- Dreams Like Deserts... (EP) (1995)
- Black Thrash Attack (1996)
- Deep Tracts of Hell (1998)
- Increased Damnation (2000)
- The Merciless (2004)
- Hades Rise (2010)
- Out To Die (2012)
- Aura Noire (2018)

=== Dødheimsgard ===
- Monumental Possession (1996)
- Satanic Art (EP) (1998)
- 666 International (1999)

=== Cadaver ===
- Primal (demo) (as Cadaver Inc.) (2000)
- Discipline (as Cadaver Inc.) (2001)
- Live Inferno (live album) (as Cadaver Inc.) (2002)
- Necrosis (2004)

=== Lamented Souls ===
- Soulstorm (demo) (1993)
- Demo (demo) (1995)
- Essence of Wounds (7") (2003)
- The Origins of Misery (2004)

=== Gorgoroth ===
- Black Mass Krakow 2004 (DVD) (2008)

=== Waklevören ===
- Brutal Agenda (2005)
- Tiden lager alle sår (2007)

=== Two Trains ===
- Two Trains (2004)

=== Darkthrone (guest appearance) ===
- Plaguewielder (2001)
- Sardonic Wrath (2004)

=== Audiopain (guest appearance) ===
- 1986 (EP) (2000)

=== Immortal ===
- All Shall Fall (2009)
- The Seventh Date of Blashyrkh (2010)
