= Aenima (band) =

Portuguese rock band

- Origin: Almada, Portugal
- Genres: Gothic rock, ethereal wave
- Years active: 1997–present
- Members: Susana; Rune Eriksen; Paulo; Rui
- Past members: Carmen Susana Simões; Pedro; Lito; Hugo; Nor; João; Rui; Miguel; Vasco; Mário
- Website: www.aenima.org

Aenima is a Portuguese dark wave, rock band formed in Almada in 1997. The name of the band is a play on the Latin word anima, meaning "soul". The band is notable for its guitar-based ambient sound and clear female vocals.

Critics quite often compare the band to Cocteau Twins and Dead Can Dance.

Aenima was founded by guitarist and producer Rune Eriksen (previously with Millennium) and vocalist Carmen Susana Simões (previously with Poetry of Shadows and Isiphilon). They soon added bassist Paulo, guitarist Nor and drummer Hugo to their line-up. Carmen was the band's main lyricist during her years with Aenima.

Aenima's debut LP album, Revolutions, was released in 1999 by the Symbiose label. Originally the band was signed for a two-album deal, but their record label soon went out of business, so Aenima had to look for another publisher.

The follow-up record, Never Fragile, was released by Equilibrium Music in 2002. With its 6 tracks, Never Fragile is considered to be an EP or maxi-single. It was highly praised by critics.

In 2003, Aenima released their second full-length album, Sentient, via the US-based Middle Pillar Presents label, becoming the first European act to be signed by the label.

Carmen left the band after Sentient was released. She was soon replaced with a new singer, Susana, a graduate of Lisbon Conservatory. As of 2007, the band was working on recording their new, yet-unnamed album.

== Discography ==
- 1999 - Revolutions (Symbiose)
- 2002 - Never Fragile (Equilibrium Music, EQM00002)
- 2003 - Sentient (Middle Pillar Presents, MPP00984)
- 2004 - Puppet Circus (Picture Disc)
