= Onyx (Ava Inferi album) =

Studio album by Ava Inferi
- Released: February 14, 2011
- Genre: Gothic metal, doom metal
- Length: 50:33
- Label: Season of Mist
- Producer: Rune Eriksen

Ava Inferi chronology
Blood of Bacchus (2009)	Onyx (2011)

Professional ratings
Review scores
Source	Rating
Allmusic	2.5/5 stars

Onyx is the fourth studio album of gothic/doom metal band, Ava Inferi. It was released on Season of Mist in 2011.

== Description ==
The album was mixed and mastered by Dan Swanö.

“The onyx stone has been attributed with many meanings over the ages”, states guitarist and composer Rune Eriksen.

“An ancient tale relates how a crooked cupid cut the fingernails of the sleeping Venus. Coming from a goddess these were transformed into the gem known on earth as onyx. An amusing and inspiring tale, yet we aimed for the metaphysical properties of this peculiar stone as it is believed to increase happiness, intuition and developing one’s instincts. In magical lore it has a darker side as well. An imprisoned demon spreads terror and nightmares to the ones within the gems reach at night and it might cause clairvoyance for its bearer. All these attributes concern our new album both on its lyrical side as well as inspiring our music.”

== Track listing ==
1. "Onyx" – 4:49
2. "The Living End" – 6:49
3. "A Portal" – 4:56
4. "((Ghostlights))" – 6:57
5. "Majesty" – 5:56
6. "The Heathen Island" – 9:19
7. "By Candlelight and Mirrors" – 5:48
8. "Venice in Fog" – 5:59

== Personnel ==
- Carmen Susana Simões — vocals
- Rune Eriksen - electric and clean guitars, effects, vocals in "The Living End"
- André Sobral - guitar
- Joana Messias - bass
- João Samora - drums, percussion
