= Cadaver (band) =

Norwegian death metal band

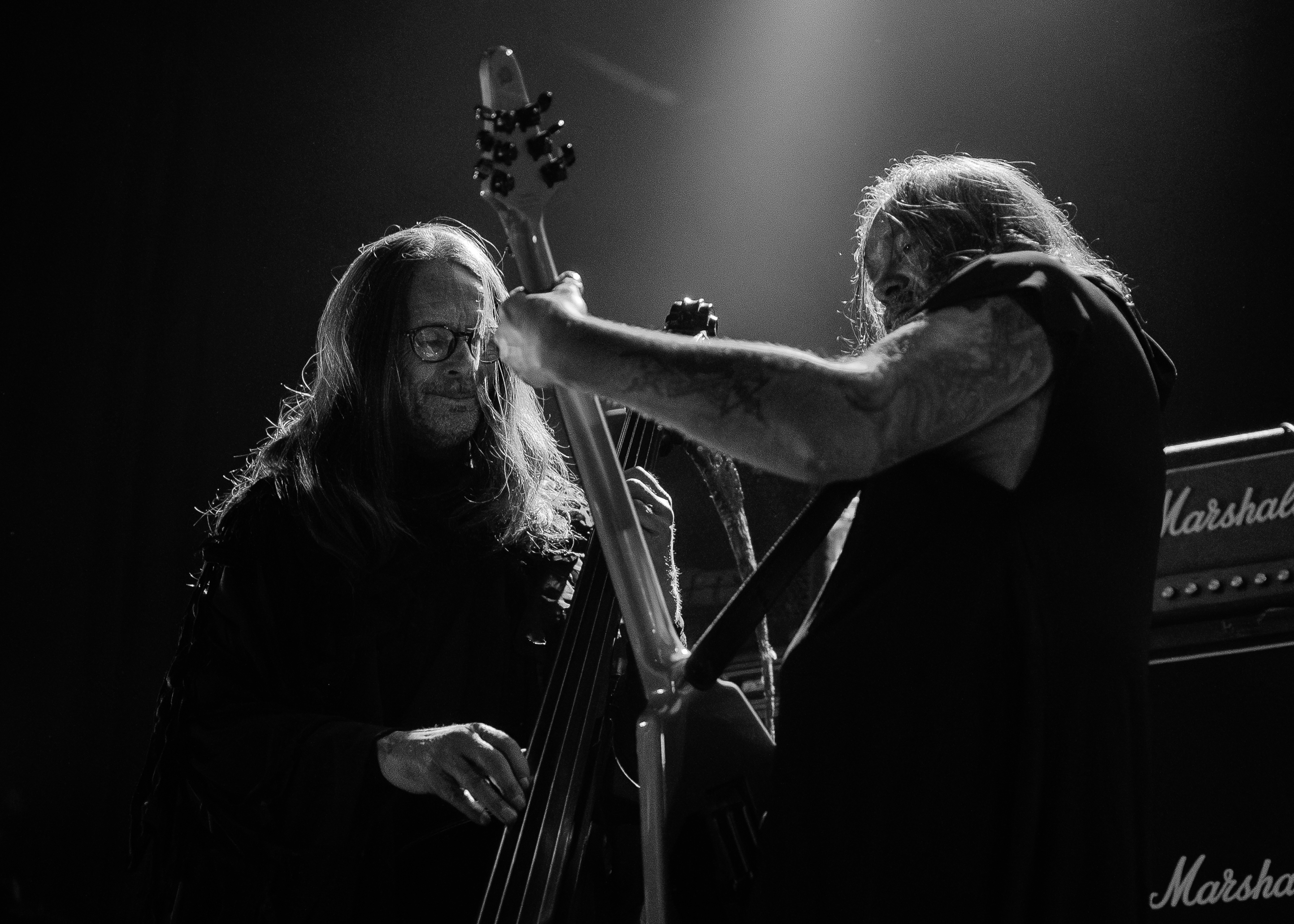
- Cadaver performing in 2025

Background information
- Also known as: Cadaver Inc. (1999−2002)
- Origin: Råde and Fredrikstad, Norway
- Genres: Death metal
- Years active: 1988−1993, 1999−2004, 2019−present
- Labels: Necrosis, Earache, Candlelight, Nuclear Blast
- Members: Anders Odden; Dirk Verbeuren
- Past members: Apollyon; Balvaz; Czral; Ole Bjerkebakke; René Jansen; Espen Sollum; Eilert Solstad
- Website: cadavertheband.com

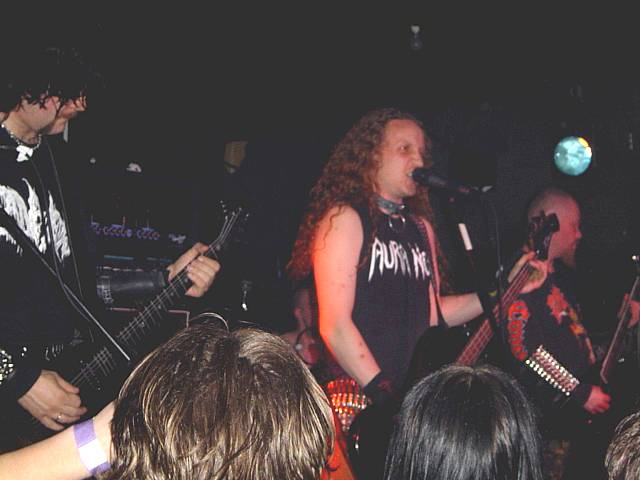
Cadaver performing in 2004

Cadaver is a Norwegian death metal band from Råde and Fredrikstad. The band was briefly active venture in the early 1990s before splitting in 1993. Cadaver reemerged as Cadaver Inc. in 1999, consisting of only one founding member. For their next album, they reverted to their original band name. They became inactive in 2004, with their final live show in 2005. The band reformed in April 2019 and released their fifth album in 2020.

== History ==
Anders Odden and Ole Bjerkebakke founded Cadaver in 1988. Bassist René Jansen joined them and the trio released the Abnormal Deformity demo in 1989. The demo attracted the attention of Carcass members Bill Steer and Jeff Walker, who signed the band to their Earache imprint label, Necrosis. The subsequent album, Hallucinating Anxiety, was released in 1990 as a split with the Carnage album Dark Recollections. Shortly after the album's release, Eilert Solstad replaced Jansen. In 1992, the band released their second album, ...In Pains. Dissension caused the band to fold in 1993.

In 1999, Odden, who went by the name Neddo, reformed the band. He recruited three new musicians and started to use the band name Cadaver Inc. The foursome, including Czral, L.J. Balvaz and Apollyon, recorded the album Discipline, which was released in February 2001. A tour followed supporting Morbid Angel and Extreme Noise Terror. A website that claimed to sell alibis for murders accompanied the album. This website attracted too much attention and the original name was restored. The band embarked on an American tour in April 2002, which had several of its dates cancelled when their booking agent was wanted by the police and went on the run. The band dropped the word "Inc." from its name after returning from the United States.

Their final album, Necrosis, was released in 2004. The band split up in 2004 with their last live show in 2005. Cadaver never left Anders Odden as an idea completely and in 2014 he decided to record a fifth album with Dirk Verbeuren as drummer and musical companion.

In April 2019, it was announced Odden had reformed the band with current Megadeth/ex-Soilwork drummer Dirk Verbeuren.

In September 2020, the band announced that their new album would be titled Edder & Bile. It was released on 27 November.

== Members ==
=== Current ===
- Anders "Neddo" Odden – guitar (1988–1993, 1995, 2002–2004, 2010–), vocals, bass (2010–)
- Eilert Solstad – bass (1990–1993, live: 2020–)
- Bjørn Dugstad Rønnow (Borknagar, Trollfest) – drums (2025–)

=== Former ===
- Ole Bjerkebakke — vocals, drums (1988–1993, 1995)
- René Jansen – bass (1989–1990)
- Espen Sollum – guitar (1990)
- Apollyon (Ole Jørgen Moe) – vocals, bass (see also Immortal, Aura Noir, Dødheimsgard) (2002–2004)
- L.J. Balvaz (Lasse Johansen) – guitar (2002–2004)
- Czral (Carl-Michael Eide) – drums (see also Ved Buens Ende, Dødheimsgard, Aura Noir) (2002–2004)
- Dirk Verbeuren – drums (2014–2024)

== Discography ==
=== Studio albums ===
- Hallucinating Anxiety (Necrosis, 1990)
- ...In Pains (Earache, 1992)
- Discipline (Earache, 2001)
- Necrosis (Candlelight, 2004)
- Edder & Bile (Nuclear Blast, 2020)
- The Age of the Offended (Nuclear Blast, 2023)
- Hymns Of Misanthropy (Listenable, 2025)

=== Demos ===
- Into the Outside (1988)
- Abnormal Deformity (1989)
- Sunset at Dawn (1989) (Live demo)
- Demo 2 (1990) (Unreleased tape, no cover art)
- Hymns of Misanthropy (1991) (Unreleased pre-prod of the ...In Pains album)
- Primal 1999 (EP, 1999)
- D.G.A.F. (EP, 2020)

=== Live albums ===
- Live Inferno (2002)

=== Split albums ===
- Cadaver/Voice of Hate (2006)
