= The Silhouette (album) =

Studio album by Ava Inferi
- Released: October 15, 2007
- Genres: Gothic metal Doom metal
- Length: 50:18
- Label: Season of Mist
- Producer: Rune Eriksen

Ava Inferi chronology
Burdens (2006)	The Silhouette (2007)	Blood of Bacchus (2009)

Professional ratings
Review scores
Source	Rating
Allmusic	3.5/5 stars

The Silhouette is the second studio album by gothic/doom metal band, Ava Inferi. It was released on Season of Mist, on 15 October 2007.

== Track listing ==
- All Songs Written By Eriksen/Simoes, except where noted.
1. "A Dança das Ondas" – 5:22
2. "Viola" – 8:02
3. "The Abandoned" – 5:33
4. "Oathbound" – 1:55 (Simoes)
5. "The Dual Keys" – 7:13
6. "Wonders of Dusk" – 4:59
7. "La Stanza Nera" – 5:41
8. "Grin of Winter" – 4:58
9. "Pulse of the Earth" – 6:35

== Personnel ==
- Carmen Susana Simões - vocals
- Rune Eriksen - electric and clean guitars, effects
- Jaime S. Ferreira - bass
- João Samora (Bandido) - drums, percussion
