= Deep Tracts of Hell =

Studio album by Aura Noir
- Released: 1998
- Recorded: July 1998
- Genre: Black metal, thrash metal
- Length: 37:08
- Label: Hammerheart Records
- Producer: Aura Noir and Kristoffer Rygg

Aura Noir chronology
Black Thrash Attack (1996)	Deep Tracts of Hell (1998)	The Merciless (2004)

Deep Tracts of Hell is the second studio album by the Norwegian black metal band Aura Noir.

It received a nine out of ten rating from Chronicles of Chaos.

== Track listing ==
No.	Title	Length
1.	"Deep Tracts Of Hell"	1:57
2.	"Released Damnation"	4:22
3.	"Swarm Of Vultures"	2:45
4.	"Blood Unity"	4:47
5.	"Slasher"	3:29
6.	"Purification Of Hell"	2:45
7.	"The Spiral Scar"	4:26
8.	"The Beautiful, Darkest Path"	4:31
9.	"Broth Of Oblivion"	4:40
10.	"To Wear The Mark"	3:26
Total length:		36:08

== Personnel ==
=== Aura Noir ===
- Aggressor − guitars, bass, drums, vocals
- Apollyon − guitars, bass, drums, vocals
- Blasphemer − guitar

=== Production and Engineering ===
- Recorded and mixed at Jester Studio in Oslo, Norway in July 1998
- Mastered at Strype Audio in Oslo, Norway
- Distributed by Rough Trade Distribution
- Artwork [Logo By] – Lise Myhre
- Engineer – Garm Backbone, Knut Magne Valle
- Layout – TurboNatas Tsagabbar
- Photography By [Photographic Artworks And Portraits] – Håkon Harris
