= Burdens (album) =

Studio album by Ava Inferi
- Released: January 23, 2006
- Recorded: June–July 2005 at Top Room Studio
- Genres: Gothic metal, doom metal
- Length: 40:37
- Label: Season of Mist
- Producer: Rune Eriksen

Ava Inferi chronology
Burdens (2006)	The Silhouette (2007)

Professional ratings
Review scores
Source	Rating
Metal Invader	4.5/6 stars

Burdens is a debut album of the Portuguese gothic metal band Ava Inferi. It was released in January 2006 by Season of Mist.

"The title describes the collective soul of the band, with its clear roots referring to the past and its troubled paths. Other titles included on this album are [...] rooted in the essences of pain and fear, as well as the eerie and the unknown".

== Track listing ==
1. "Ava Inferi" – 4:19
2. "The Shrine" – 0:33
3. "A Glimpse of Sanity" – 7:06
4. "The Wings of Emptiness" – 5:35
5. "Sinisters" – 9:36
6. "Vultos" – 4:50
7. "Fate of Mountains" – 8:38

== Credits ==
=== Band members ===
- Carmen Susana Simões — vocals
- Rune Eriksen - electric and clean guitars, effects
- Jaime S. Ferreira - bass
- João Samora (Bandido) - drums and percussion

=== Session musicians ===
- Miguel Do Vale - piano on 1, 2
- Nuno Roberto - Portuguese guitar on 5, acoustic rhythm on 7

=== Production ===
- Piano recorded at My Home Your Tomb Studio, Almada, Portugal.
- Everything else recorded between June 20 - July 8, 2005 at Top Room Studio, Norway.
- Mixed between July 12–18, 2005 by Börge Finstad (BBF) and Rune Eriksen.
- All songs by Rune Eriksen, lyrics by Carmen Susana Simões.

=== Other ===
- Artworks by Nuno Roberto and João Monteiro.
