= Necrosis (disambiguation) =

Necrosis is a form of cell injury that results in the premature death of cells in living tissue.

Necrosis may also refer to:

- Necrosis (album), a 2004 album by the Norwegian death metal band Cadaver
- Necrosis (film), a 2009 independent film directed by Jason Robert Stephens
- Necrosis, a sublabel of Earache Records
