= Black Necrotic Obfuscation =

EP by Zweizz
- Released: October 2004
- Genres: IDM; Noise music Black metal
- Length: 11:33
- Label: Vendlus Records
- Producer: Svein Egil Hatlevik

Black Necrotic Obfuscation is the debut EP by the Norwegian electronic/noise/avant-garde metal artist Zweizz. It was released in a limited edition of 512 copies; 256 of these had red transparent vinyl, whereas the remaining 256 had transparent blue vinyl.

According to Zweizz mainman Svein Egil Hatlevik, both songs featured on Black Necrotic Obfuscation were originally intended to be used in his other band Fleurety, but since this band is active to a very small extent, Hatlevik finished the songs himself.

== Critical reception ==
Black Necrotic Obfuscation was met with several reviews comparing the music to Hatlevik's previous work in Fleurety and Dødheimsgard.

Terrorizer Magazine's James Hinchliffe set his grade to 7 points out of 10: "Those who still remember the incorrigibly weird Fleurety and sometime Dødheimsgard member Svein Egil Hatlevik's mid-'90s serial killer noise project Aphrodisiac are best suited to getting something out of his new solo excursion, Zweizz. Both Hatlevik's technology and compositional ability have advanced ten years since Aphrodisiac, so the pair on this ultra-limited 7", and the much more rhythmic, processed edge of this material means it's more concise and propulsive, full of the battiness of Norwegian techno and the fuck-you of black metal."

Lars Lolk of the Danish metal webzine Antenna gave the release 70 points out of 100: "Composed by post-post-modern black metal, the electronic glitches of Svein Egil Hatlevik takes his computerized pin-machinery from latter days Dödheimsgard and DHG, as well as the latest Fleurety record, Department of Apocalyptic Affairs, to absolutely new, bizarrely twisted realms. The title track is befuddled by Svein's obtrusive, distorted roars, making it the least accessible of the two tracks, although the black metal adherence is more visible due to the aforementioned offence. "Birth, Sex, Death" is an appealing creation, not least due to Svein's calm narration and the Kraftwerk-sounding references, and this cut draws some comparison to Ulver, as does Zweizz as a whole, but this product is 60 degrees more aggressive than the one of Ulver."

Lunar Hypnosis handed out 8.5 points out of 10. "With the title track of the 7” Hatlevik immediately makes it clear that Zweizz is his very own brainchild and not some copycat of what he did with his past bands. With Zweizz his urge to experiment reaches a lot further than fore mentioned bands. One can discover some elements of black metal in the sound, but it thrives a lot more on electronics and computer noise."

== Track listing ==
1. "Black Necrotic Obfuscation" - 05:12
2. "Birth, Sex, Death" - 06:14

== Credits ==
- Svein Egil Hatlevik - Computers, Vocals.
- Kim Sølve - Guitars on track #1.
