= 666 International =

Studio album by Dødheimsgard
- Released: 11 June 1999
- Genres: Black metal, avant-garde metal, industrial metal
- Length: 49:02
- Label: Moonfog Productions
- Producer: Bjørn Boge

Dødheimsgard chronology
Satanic Art (1998)	666 International (1999)	Supervillain Outcast (2007)

666 International is the third full-length album by Norwegian black metal band Dødheimsgard. It was released on 11 June 1999 by Moonfog Productions.

With 666 International, Dødheimsgard abandoned the black metal style of their previous two albums, further developing the style of their EP Satanic Art (1998). The album heads into a more avant-garde style that fuses black and industrial metal, with some electronic and keyboard interludes.

666 International was Dødheimsgard's last release to feature Aldrahn on vocals (until his eventual return to the band in 2013, when the band recorded A Umbra Omega with him), Apollyon on bass, and Svein Egil Hatlevik on keyboards. It was also their last release under the name Dødheimsgard; in 2003, the band shortened their name to DHG.

The piano intro on "Shiva-Interfere" is taken from the outro track "Wrapped in Plastic" from Satanic Art.

It was re-released in 2011 by Peaceville Records, and included two bonus tracks. "Hæmorrhage Era One Reconstructed" was originally featured on the 2000 compilation Moonfog 2000: A Different Perspective.

== Critical reception ==
Professional ratings
Review scores
Source	Rating
AllMusic	4/5 stars

William York of AllMusic called 666 International "an elaborate, ambitious and creative album that is bound to frustrate purists".

== Track listing ==
All lyrics are written by Aldrahn; all music is composed by Vicotnik except where noted.

No.	Title	Length
1.	"Shiva-Interfere"	9:10
2.	"Ion Storm"	4:20
3.	"Carpet Bombing" (instrumental; music by Svein Hatlevik)	2:25
4.	"Regno Potiri"	10:19
5.	"Final Conquest"	5:59
6.	"Logic" (instrumental; music by Svein Hatlevik)	0:59
7.	"Sonar Bliss"	7:39
8.	"Magic" (instrumental; music by Svein Hatlevik)	1:43
9.	"Completion"	6:28

2011 re-release bonus tracks
No.	Title	Length
10.	"Hæmorrhage Era One Reconstructed"	5:05
11.	"Proton Navigator" (instrumental)	9:03

== Personnel ==
=== Dødheimsgard ===
- Aldrahn (Bjørn Dencker Gjerde) – guitars, vocals
- Vicotnik (Yusaf Parvez) – guitars
- Apollyon (Ole Jørgen Moe) – bass
- Czral (Carl-Michael Eide) – drums, percussion
- Mr. Magic Logic (Svein Egil Hatlevik) – keyboards

=== Additional personnel ===
- Bjørn Boge – production, engineering, mixing
- Tom "Thrawn" Kvålsvoll – mastering
