= Black Thrash Attack =

Studio album by Aura Noir
- Released: 1996
- Recorded: 20–23 June 1996
- Genres: Black metal; thrash metal
- Length: 42:09
- Label: Malicious
- Producer: Aura Noir

Aura Noir chronology
Dreams Like Deserts (1995)	Black Thrash Attack (1996)	Deep Tracts of Hell (1998)

Professional ratings
Review scores
Source	Rating
AllMusic	3/5 stars
BestBlackMetalAlbums.com	5/5 stars

Black Thrash Attack is the first studio album by the Norwegian black metal band Aura Noir. This is the first album to feature Blasphemer (Rune Eriksen) from Mayhem on guitars. As indicated in the title, this album is a mix of black metal and thrash metal and as such contains quite a few hints at early German thrash bands such as Kreator and Destruction.

All songs by Aura Noir. Track 7 co-written by Aldrahn of Dødheimsgard.

In 2013, Decibel ranked Black Thrash Attack at number 86 on its list of the Top 100 Black Metal Albums of All Time.

== Track listing ==
No.	Title	Length
1.	"Sons of Hades"	3:31
2.	"Conqueror"	4:03
3.	"Caged Wrath"	5:28
4.	"Wretched Face of Evil"	4:11
5.	"Black Thrash Attack"	5:11
6.	"The Pest"	3:11
7.	"The One Who Smite"	4:07
8.	"Eternally Your Shadow"	3:36
9.	"Destructor"	4:41
10.	"Fighting for Hell"	4:10

== Personnel ==
- Aggressor – guitars, bass, drums, vocals on tracks 2, 4, 6, 8, & 10
- Apollyon – guitars, bass, drums, vocals on tracks 1, 3, 5, 7, & 9
- Blasphemer – guitars
