= Hades Rise =

Studio album by Aura Noir
- Released: 2008
- Genre: Black metal, thrash metal
- Length: 38:20
- Label: Tyrant Syndicate Productions/ Peaceville Records
- Producer: Aura Noir

Aura Noir chronology
The Merciless (2004)	Hades Rise (2008)	Out to Die (2012)

Professional ratings
Review scores
Source	Rating
Terrorizer	(Nov 2008)

Hades Rise is an album by the Norwegian black/thrash metal band Aura Noir. It features guest appearances by Danny Coralles (Autopsy, Abscess) and Blasphemer (ex-Mayhem). Art direction was by Carl-Michael Eide, layout by Justin Bartlett.

== Track listing ==
1. "Hades Rise" – 3:26
2. "Gaping Grave Awaits" – 4:01
3. "Unleash The Demon" – 3:48
4. "Pestilent Streams" – 3:26
5. "Schitzoid Paranoid" – 2:45
6. "Death Mask" – 3:36
7. "Shadows of Death" – 5:48
8. "Iron Night/Torment Storm" – 5:09
9. "South American Death" – 3:13
10. "The Stalker" – 3:08

== Personnel ==
Aura Noir

- Apollyon − drums, bass, vocals, guitar
- Aggressor − bass, vocals, guitar

Guest musicians

- Danny Coralles − lead guitar on "Gaping Grave Awaits"
- Blasphemer − lead guitars on "Iron Night/Torment Storm", "Death Mask" and "Unleash the Demon"
