= Grand Declaration of War =

Studio album by Mayhem
- Released: 6 June 2000
- Recorded: November 1999 – January 2000
- Studio: Fagerborg and Top Room
- Genre: Avant-garde metal
- Length: 45:58
- Label: Season of Mist; Necropolis
- Producer: Mayhem; Børge Finstad

Mayhem chronology
De Mysteriis Dom Sathanas (1994)	Grand Declaration of War (2000)	European Legions (2001)

Alternative cover
- 2018 reissue

Grand Declaration of War is the second studio album by the Norwegian black metal band Mayhem, released by Season of Mist and Necropolis Records on 6 June 2000. A re-release of the album came out in December 2018, with Jaime Gomez Arellano overseeing the production.

The album's title and some of the lyrics are taken from the writings of the German philosopher Friedrich Nietzsche, particularly his books Twilight of the Idols—Nietzsche called Twilight of the Idols "a grand declaration of war" („eine grosse Kriegserklärung“). Grand Declaration of War is known for its eccentric musical style, which garnered a mixed reception upon release.

== Musical style ==
The album displays a noteworthy difference in style when compared to Mayhem's other straightforward black metal records, focusing heavily on experimental and progressive elements. In his book Mean Deviation: Four Decades of Progressive Heavy Metal, Jeff Wagner wrote that Grand Declaration of War features "a variety of vocal shadings to match the multi-layered music", between "A Time to Die", described by Wagner as "one minute and forty-eight seconds of black calculus", "A Bloodsword and a Colder Sun" offering "squishy electronic groove, so close to trip-hop that it instantly became the album's most controversial track" and the "mesmerizing ten-minute sprawling landscape of doom" "Completion in Science of Agony". The album's "sonic clarity" was "a complete 180-degree turn" from the band's early "scuzzy 'necro' approach". Parts of the black metal scene had hoped Mayhem would not reform after the murder of the original guitarist Øystein "Euronymous" Aarseth as "that would not be right", or at least were "rather sceptical when it was known that [sic] MAYHEM should go on even without Dead or Euronymous". Many longtime Mayhem fans despised Blasphemer because "he wasn't Aarseth". Jeff Wagner calls Grand Declaration of War "Mayhem's own Into the Pandemonium, an album that had perverted and turned inside out the black metal genre as Celtic Frost's [Into the] Pandemonium had done to thrash metal". Alex Henderson of AllMusic stated that the band "has outdone itself with the epic Grand Declaration of War, which could arguably be described as black metal's equivalent of Queensryche's Operation: Mindcrime".

A remastered version of the album was released in December 2018; the original 'cold', 'sterile' production was swapped out for a more raw sound with the bass and drums made more prominent in the mix.

== Critical reception ==
Professional ratings
Review scores
Source	Rating
AllMusic	4/5 stars
Kerrang!	4/5 stars
Metal Hammer	9/10 (2000 version) (2018 version)

AllMusic critic Alex Henderson wrote: "Grand Declaration of War won't appeal to anyone with a short attention span, but for those who can sit down and really give this CD their undivided attention, the rewards are great."

== Track listing ==
All lyrics are written by Maniac; all music is composed by Blasphemer.

No.	Title	Length
0.	"Untitled" (hidden in pregap before track 1 on original CD; simply the final track reversed)	2:11
1.	"A Grand Declaration of War"	4:14
2.	"In the Lies Where Upon You Lay"	5:59
3.	"A Time to Die"	1:48
4.	"View from Nihil (Part I of II)"	3:04
5.	"View from Nihil (Part II of II)"	1:16
6.	"A Bloodsword and a Colder Sun (Part I of II)"	0:33
7.	"A Bloodsword and a Colder Sun (Part II of II)"	4:27
8.	"Crystalized Pain in Deconstruction"	4:09
9.	"Completion in Science of Agony (Part I of II)"	9:44
10.	"To Daimonion (Part I of III)"	3:25
11.	"To Daimonion (Part II of III)"	4:52
12.	"To Daimonion (Part III of III)"	0:07
13.	"Completion in Science of Agony (Part II of II)"	2:14
Total length:		45:58

== Personnel ==
- Maniac – vocals
- Blasphemer – guitars
- Hellhammer – drums
- Necrobutcher – bass

Technical

- Recorded in Nov/Jan 1999/2000 at Fagerborg Studio and Top Room Studio
- Engineered by Børge Finstad
- Produced by Mayhem and Børge Finstad
- Mastered at Masterhuset by Morten Lund
- Musical Architecture by Blasphemer
- All lyrics assembled, designed and directed by Maniac

Credits

- Anders Odden – co-writing and programming of "A Bloodsword and a Colder Sun"
- Øyvind Hægeland – additional vocals on "Completion in Science of Agony"
- Tore Ylwizaker – samples and noise construction on "Completion in Science of Agony"

Artwork

- Sebastian Ludvigsen – photography
- Mark Francombe Red – cover design
- Anne Cecilie Olavesen – makeup
