= Blood of Bacchus =

Studio album by Ava Inferi
- Released: May 25, 2009
- Recorded: November 24 – December 23, 2008
- Studio: Top Room Studio (Lunner, Norway)
- Genre: Gothic metal; doom metal
- Length: 53:59
- Label: Season of Mist
- Producer: Rune Eriksen

Ava Inferi chronology
The Silhouette (2007)	Blood of Bacchus (2009)	Onyx (2011)

Professional ratings
Review scores
Source	Rating
Allmusic	3.5/5 stars

Blood of Bacchus is the third studio album by gothic/doom metal band, Ava Inferi. It was released on Season of Mist, on 25 May 2009.

== Track listing ==
1. "Truce" – 3:29
2. "Last Sign of Summer" – 6:45
3. "Colours of the Dark" – 7:03
4. "Black Wings" – 2:14
5. "Appeler les Loups" – 9:22
6. "Be Damned" – 7:39
7. "Tempestade" – 7:22
8. "Blood of Bacchus" – 6:19
9. "Memoirs" – 3:47

== Personnel ==
- Carmen Susana Simões — vocals
- Rune Eriksen - electric and clean guitars, effects
- Jaime S. Ferreira - bass
- João Samora - drums, percussion

== Guest appearances ==
- Kristoffer Rygg - Vocals
- Live Julianne Kostøl - Cello
- Arne Martinussen - Piano
- Fredrik Söderlind
