= Mezzerschmitt =

Norwegian black metal band

Mezzerschmitt is a Norwegian black metal band, a spinoff of Mayhem. It was formed in 2000 by Mayhem members Jan Axel Blomberg (Hellhammer) and Rune Eriksen (Blasphemer), collaborating with Lars Sørensen from Red Harvest. They intended to create an industrial metal band, but their sound soon shifted towards black metal while still incorporating industrial elements. Mezzerschmitt have released only one EP so far, Weltherrschaft.

== Band members ==
- Herr Schmitt (Rune Eriksen, Blasphemer) - Vocals, guitars, bass
- Oberleutnant LS (Lars Sørensen) - Keyboards
- Hauptman Hammer (Jan Axel Blomberg, Hellhammer) - Drums

== Discography ==
- Weltherrschaft (EP, 2002)

== Sources ==
- 2002 EP Review - Rock Hard
- 2002 EP Review - Metal.de
