= The Merciless (album) =

Studio album by Aura Noir
- Released: 1 October 2004
- Recorded: January-June 2004
- Genres: Black metal; thrash metal
- Length: 27:38
- Labels: Tyrant Syndicate Productions/ Peaceville Records
- Producer: Aura Noir

Aura Noir chronology
Deep Tracts of Hell (2000)	The Merciless (2004)	Deep Dreams of Hell (2005)

Professional ratings
Review scores
Source	Rating
Chronicles of Chaos	6/10
MetalReviews.com	81/100

The Merciless is the third studio album by the Norwegian black/thrash metal band Aura Noir. It features guest appearances by members of Darkthrone and Carpathian Forest. Design by Justin Bartlett.

== Track listing ==
1. "Upon the Dark Throne" – 3:42
2. "Condor" – 4:05
3. "Black Metal Jaw" – 2:36
4. "Hell's Fire" – 3:40
5. "Black Deluge Night" – 3:25
6. "Funeral Thrash" – 3:22
7. "Sordid" – 3:24
8. "Merciless" – 3:24

== Credits ==
- Aggressor - Bass, drums, guitar, vocals
- Apollyon - Bass, drums, guitar, vocals
- Blasphemer - Guitar

Guest musicians

- Fenriz (of Darkthrone) - Guest vocals on "Upon The Dark Throne"
- Nattefrost (of Carpathian Forest) - Guest vocals on "Funeral Thrash"
