= Black Medium Current =

Studio album by Dødheimsgard
- Released: April 14, 2023
- Recorded: 2021–2022
- Studio: Toproom Studios, Lunner, Norway
- Genre: Avant-garde metal, post-metal, experimental rock, black metal, extreme metal, progressive metal
- Length: 69:35
- Label: Peaceville Records
- Producer: Vicotnik

Dødheimsgard chronology
A Umbra Omega (2015)	Black Medium Current (2023)

Professional ratings
Review scores
Source	Rating
Blabbermouth.net	8.5/10
Distorted Sound	9/10
Ghost Cult Magazine	8/10
Kerrang!	4/5
Metal Injection	10/10

Black Medium Current is the sixth full-length album by Norwegian metal band Dødheimsgard, also known as DHG. It was released on April 14, 2023, by Peaceville Records.

== Reception ==
The album has received positive reviews. Invisible Oranges noted that the album has "the calm yet impassioned churning of specifically Norwegian black metal, overtly reminiscent of Bergtatt or Transilvanian Hunger. Yet as the lengthy phrases begin to unfurl and lengthen, and the vibrant being that is formed as Black Medium Current becomes more and more known, a sense of awe overcomes you as the challenge of understanding presents itself. The familiar references to yesteryear are the exchange for the amount of attention you'll need to fully consume this undertaking of a record."

Kez Whelan of The Quietus stated in an article reviewing albums released that month, "Despite all these disparate influences, Black Medium Current as a whole feels more fluid and less cluttered than its predecessor – and whilst that chaotic feel was undoubtedly a big part of the last album's appeal, the more lucid, focussed[sic] approach here really works. If A Umbra Omega felt like the soundtrack to an astronaut's existential angst and encroaching madness upon leaving earth, this instead is the crystalline moment of clarity they might feel afterwards, taking in the sight of their planet nestled amongst the stars whilst revelling[sic] in the vast scope of the universe itself."

== Track listing ==
No.	Title	Length
1.	"Et smelter" ("A Melter")	10:19
2.	"Tankespinnerens smerte" ("The Mind Spinner's Pain")	7:43
3.	"Interstellar Nexus"	8:01
4.	"It Does Not Follow"	8:21
5.	"Voyager"	1:46
6.	"Halow" ("Hello")	9:37
7.	"Det tomme kalde mørke" ("The Empty Cold Darkness")	7:35
8.	"Abyss Perihelion Transit"	11:00
9.	"Requiem Aeternum" ("Eternal Rest")	5:13

== Personnel ==
=== DHG ===
- Vicotnik (Yusaf Parvez) – vocals, guitars, synthesizers, writing (on tracks 1–4, 6–8)
- Tommy Guns Thunberg – guitars
- L.E. Måløy – bass, piano, cello, writing (on tracks 5, 9)
- Myrvoll – drums

=== Additional personnel ===
- Sttng – flute (on track 1)
