= Dreams Like Deserts =

EP by Aura Noir
- Released: 1995
- Genre: Black metal
- Length: 20:34
- Producer: Aura Noir

Aura Noir chronology
Dreams Like Deserts (1995)	Black Thrash Attack (1996)

Dreams Like Deserts is the debut EP by the Norwegian black metal band Aura Noir, released in 1995.

== Track listing ==
No.	Title	Length
1.	"The Rape"	3:26
2.	"Forlorn Blessings to the Dreamking"	3:29
3.	"Dreams, Like Deserts"	5:00
4.	"Angel Ripper"	3:50
5.	"Snake"	1:51
6.	"Mirage"	2:58
Total length:		20:34

== Personnel ==
- Aggressor − guitars, bass, drums, vocals
- Apollyon − guitars, bass, drums, vocals
