= Written in Waters =

Studio album by Ved Buens Ende
- Released: October 1995
- Recorded: Endless Studios, May 1995
- Genres: Black metal, avant-garde metal
- Length: 57:08
- Label: Misanthropy Records
- Producer: Ved Buens Ende

Ved Buens Ende chronology
Written in Waters (demo) (1995)	Written in Waters (1995)	Those Who Caress the Pale (1997)

Written in Waters is the debut studio album by the Norwegian avant-garde metal band Ved Buens Ende. It is the only album the band released before they disbanded.

Jillian Drachman of Loudwire described the album as "a poetic and cerebral mind-bending voyage into the thorn-pierced heart of romance." She said the album "contains a Daliesque quality within its hallucinatory dreamscapes," and that the album also contains "futuristic vibes."

== Track listing ==
- All music by Ved Buens Ende. All lyrics by Carl-Michael Eide, except "Den Saakaldte" by Vicotnik.

No.	Title	Length
1.	"I Sang for the Swans"	7:01
2.	"You, That May Wither"	4:54
3.	"It's Magic"	5:25
4.	"Den Saakaldte" ("The So-Called")"	8:49
5.	"Carrier of Wounds"	7:40
6.	"Coiled in Wings"	7:04
7.	"Autumn Leaves""	5:07
8.	"Remembrance of Things Past"	8:54
9.	"To Swarm Deserted Away"	2:14
Total length:		57:08

== Critical reception ==
Professional ratings
Review scores
Source	Rating
AllMusic	4/5 stars

Written in Waters is considered to be ahead of its time. William York of AllMusic wrote, "Ved Buens Ende's sole full-length, Written in Waters, is an album of esoteric, experimental black metal that, years after its release, still sounds like nothing else."

In 2013, Decibel ranked Written in Waters at number 75 on its list of the Top 100 Black Metal Albums of All Time.

== Personnel ==
Ved Buens Ende

- Yusaf Parvez (credited as "Vicotnik") - harsh vocals, electric guitar
- Hugh Mingay (credited as "Skoll") - bass guitar, keyboards, additional vocals (on "It's Magic")
- Carl-Michael Eide - clean vocals, drums, percussion

Additional musicians

- Kathrine Skjeldal - backing vocals

Production staff

- Ved Buens Ende - production, arrangements
- Pål Espen Johannessen (credited as "Pål") - recording, mixing, engineering
- Lise Myhre (credited as "Lise") - cover art
