= Nader Sadek =

- Origin: International
- Genre: Technical death metal
- Years active: 2011–present
- Labels: Self-Distribution, Season of Mist

Nader Sadek is an Egyptian-American artist. His death metal project of the same name gathers many well-known and emerging artists from the entire metal scene, focusing mostly on black and death metal. Sadek resides in New York City and has worked as a stage artist for Mayhem and Sunn O))), before he decided to create a supergroup of death metal musicians using contacts he gained through his career. Aside from his musical projects and his own art, Sadek produces and directs music videos, most notably, Morbid Angel's "Garden of Disdain", Incantation, Inquisition, Nordjevel, Alkaloid, and more.

== History ==
The project was created by Sadek's desire to bring his philosophical perception of petroleum usage to the public eye. The project released their debut album, In the Flesh, on May 16, 2011, in Europe and a day later in the United States.

== Band members ==
=== Current members ===
- Nader Sadek – songwriting, concepts, direction, vocals (2011–present)
- Glen Benton - vocals (2015–present)
- Attila Csihar - vocals (2011–present)
- Seth Van De Loo - vocals (2015–present)
- Hannes Grossmann – drums (2015–present)
- Derek Roddy – drums (2015–present)
- Septimiu Hărşan - drums (2019–present)
- Dominic Lapointe – bass (2015–present)
- Richie Brown - guitar (2016–present)
- Jim Ross - guitar (2016-present)
- Benoît "Barby" Claus - bass

=== Live members ===
- Richie Brown – guitar (2016)
- Seth Van De Loo - vocals (2015)
- Andreas Kisser – guitar (2014)
- Bobby Koelble – guitar (2014)
- Sean Frey – guitar (2011)
- Mike Lerner – guitar (2009)
- Nicholas McMaster – bass guitar (2009)
- Rohit Chaturvedi – guitar (2016)
- Kevin Paradis – Drums (2020)

=== Former members ===
- Steve Tucker – vocals (2011–2013)
- Tony Norman - lead guitar (2011-2013)
- Marcin "Novy" Nowak – bass guitar (2011–2014)
- Rune "Blasphemer" Eriksen – guitar (2011–2015)
- Flo Mounier – drums (2011–2015)
- Travis Ryan – vocals (2014–2015)
- Marcin Rygiel – bass guitar (2014–2015)
- Tom Geldschläger – guitar (2015–2016)

== Discography ==
Albums

- In the Flesh (2011)

EPs

- The Malefic: Chapter III (2014)
- The Serapeum (2020)

DVDs

- Living Flesh (2013)

Music videos (all directed by Nader Sadek)

- "Nigredo in Necromance" (2011)
- "Sulffer" (2011)
- "Re:Mechanic" (2014)
- "Deformation by Incision" (2014)
- "Entropy Eternal" Sample (2014)
