= Ava Inferi =

Portuguese band

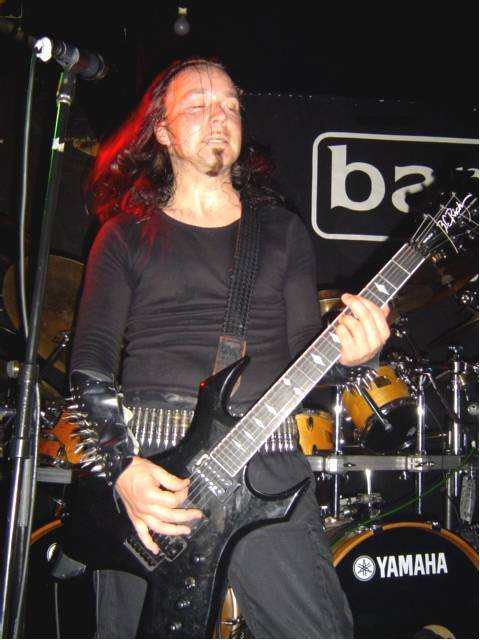
- Founding guitarist Rune Eriksen

Background information
- Origin: Almada, Portugal
- Genres: Gothic metal, doom metal
- Years active: 2005–2013
- Label: Season of Mist
- Past members: Carmen Susana Simões; Rune Eriksen; Joana Messias; João Samora (Bandido); Jaime S. Ferreira

Ava Inferi was a Portuguese gothic metal band formed in Almada by Norwegian guitarist and songwriter Rune Eriksen (a.k.a. Blasphemer, Mayhem). Their debut album, Burdens, was released in January 2006.

In the spring of 2007, vocalist Carmen Susana Simões laid vocals on the re-recording Under Satanæ by Moonspell. In October 2007, the band released their second studio album, called The Silhouette.

In May 2009, the band released their third album, Blood of Bacchus.

In February 2011, the band released their fourth studio album, entitled Onyx.

Rune Eriksen announced the end of Ava Inferi on 23 May 2013.

== Band members ==
- Carmen Susana Simões – vocals
- Rune Eriksen – guitars
- Joana Messias – bass
- André Sobral - guitar

== Session members ==
- Daniel Cardoso (piano)

== Discography ==
- Burdens (2006)
- The Silhouette (2007)
- Blood of Bacchus (2009)
- Onyx (2011)

== Music videos ==
Video	Album	Director	Length
"Dança Das Ondas"	The Silhouette	Rui Veiga	05:18
"Last Sign of Summer"	Blood of Bacchus		04:45
"Majesty"	Onyx	Costin Chioreanu	05:56
"The Living End"	Onyx	Costin Chioreanu	07:28
