= Out to Die =

Out To Die

Studio album by Aura Noir
- Released: 23 March 2012
- Genres: Black metal, thrash metal
- Length: 32:37
- Labels: High Roller Records / Indie Recordings
- Producer: Aura Noir

Aura Noir chronology
Hades Rise (2008)	Out To Die (2012)	Aura Noire (2018)

Professional ratings
Review scores
Source	Rating
Allmusic	link
About.com	link

Out To Die is the fifth studio album by the Norwegian black/thrash metal band Aura Noir. Artwork, Cover, Layout by Chioreanu Costin.

== Track listing ==
All music is composed by Aura Noir.

No.	Title	Lyrics	Length
1.	"Trenches"	Apollyon	3:57
2.	"Fed To The Flames"	Aggressor	3:32
3.	"Abbadon"	Dirge Rep	4:02
4.	"The Grin From The Gallows"	Aggressor	4:44
5.	"Withheld"	Fenriz	3:02
6.	"Priest's Hellish Fiend"	Aggressor	4:20
7.	"Deathwish"	Apollyon	3:31
8.	"Out To Die"	Dirge Rep	4:31
Total length:			32:37

== Personnel ==
- Apollyon − drums, bass, vocals
- Aggressor − vocals, guitar
- Blasphemer − lead guitar
