= Kronet Til Konge =

Studio album by Dødheimsgard
- Released: 1995
- Recorded: February 1995
- Genre: Black metal
- Length: 54:08
- Label: Malicious
- Producer: Dødheimsgard

Dødheimsgard chronology
Kronet Til Konge (1995)	Monumental Possession (1996)

Kronet Til Konge (Norwegian for "Crowned To Be King") is the debut studio album by Norwegian black metal band Dødheimsgard. It was released in 1995, through Malicious Records. Kronet Til Konge was re-released in 1999 on Century Media Records.

== Track listing ==
1. "Intro" – 0:59
2. "Å Slakte Gud" ("To Slaughter God") – 6:09
3. "En Krig å Seire" ("A War to Win") – 4:58
4. "Jesu Blod" ("Jesus' Blood") – 4:51
5. "Midnattskogens sorte kjerne" ("The Black Core of the Midnightforest") – 6:47
6. "Kuldeblest Over Evig Isøde" ("Cold Sores Over Everlasting Ice") – 4:13
7. "Kronet til konge" ("Crowned to Be King") – 4:35
8. "Mournful, Yet and Forever" – 7:05
9. "Når Vi Har Dolket Guds Hjerte" ("When We Have Stabbed God's Heart") – 4:47
10. "Starcave, Depths and Chained" – 3:41
11. "When Heavens End" – 5:18
12. "Outro" – 0:42

== Critical reception ==
Professional ratings
Review scores
Source	Rating
AllMusic	2.5/5 stars

Steve Huey of AllMusic said, "Dødheimsgard have the basic Norwegian black metal style down pat, even if they don't really add anything new to the genre".

== Personnel ==
- Aldrahn – vocals, guitar
- Vicotnik – drums
- Fenriz – bass guitar, synthesizer
