= The Black Flux =

Studio album by Virus
- Released: November 10, 2008
- Recorded: June 2007–July 2008
- Studio: Amper Tone Studios
- Genre: Avant-garde metal
- Length: 53:11
- Label: Season of Mist
- Producer: Bård Ingebrigtsen

Virus chronology
Carheart (2003)	The Black Flux (2008)	The Agent That Shapes the Desert (2011)

The Black Flux is the second studio album by Norwegian avant-garde metal band Virus. It was released on 10 November 2008 via Season of Mist.

== Background ==
The Black Flux was recorded between June 2007 and July 2008 at Amper Tone Studios in Oslo.

This is the band's only studio album that was released by the label Season of Mist.

== Track listing ==
No.	Title	Length
1.	"Stalkers of the Drift"	4:29
2.	"As Virulent as You"	5:56
3.	"Archives"	6:31
4.	"The Black Flux"	6:39
5.	"Intermission: Ocean Highway" (instrumental)	3:54
6.	"Inward Bound"	6:50
7.	"Lost Peacocks"	5:48
8.	"Shame Eclipse"	4:12
9.	"Strange Calm"	8:52
Total length:		53:11

== Critical reception ==
Professional ratings
Review scores
Source	Rating
AllMusic	3/5 stars
Sputnikmusic	4.5/5 stars

The album received generally positive reviews. AllMusic reviewer Greg Prato stated: "Most times, this Oslo, Norway-based outfit sounds comparable to Voivod, but at other times sound like a distant musical disciple of the Melvins (with far less distortion on the guitar and more discernible vocals). Either way, one thing's for certain. These chaps like to stretch a guitar part until your brain goes numb, as evidenced by the album's title track, which rambles on for nearly three minutes before the vocals finally kick in. Elsewhere, a tune like "Lost Peacocks" cuts to the chase quicker when it comes to the vocals, with a singing style (courtesy of Virus' singer/guitarist, Czral) that sounds patterned after the late/great Ian Curtis from Joy Division."

== Personnel ==
Virus

- Czral — vocals, guitars
- Plenum — bass
- Einz — drums

Additional personnel

- Bård Ingebrigtsen — baritone guitar, violin, piano, slide guitar, effects, production
- B9 — soundscapes, ambience (tracks 3, 5)

Other staff

- Tom Kvålsvoll — mastering
- Sapfo Stavrides — photography
- Kvohst — lyrics
