= Carl-Michael Eide =

Norwegian black metal musician

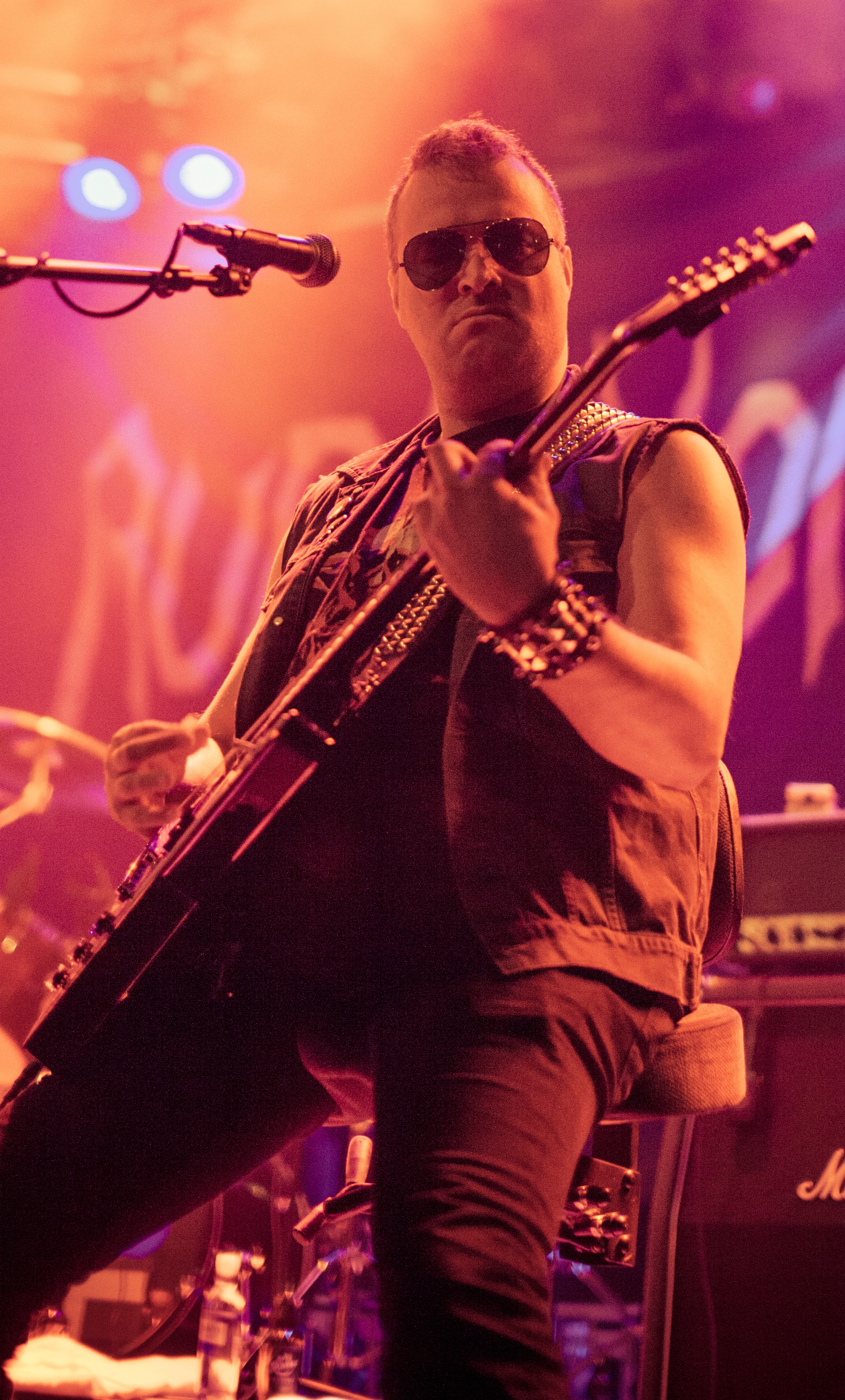
- Live with Aura Noir in 2012

Background information
- Also known as: Czral; Aggressor; Exhurtum
- Born: Carl-Michael Eide; 24 July 1974 (age 51)
- Origin: Norway
- Genres: Heavy metal, black metal, progressive rock, progressive metal, avant-garde metal
- Occupations: Musician, songwriter
- Instruments: Vocals, guitar, bass guitar, drums

Carl-Michael Eide (born 24 July 1974), also known under the stage names Aggressor, Czral and Exhurtum, is a Norwegian black metal multi-instrumentalist, vocalist and songwriter best known for his work with metal bands Ved Buens Ende, Aura Noir and Virus. Eide has played in various black metal and avant-garde metal bands, including Cadaver, Dødheimsgard, Satyricon, Ulver and Infernö, and has been a session drummer for Dimmu Borgir.

Eide's drumming style consists of very little repetition and a tendency to shy away from traditional drumming. In addition to the usual harsh vocals of black metal, Eide uses a form of croon in the avant-garde metal bands Ved Buens Ende and Virus. He lost the use of his feet due to a falling accident in 2005, where he fell from a four-story building and spent several months in hospital, and has not been able to play drums since, but is still active as a vocalist, guitarist and bassist.

== Discography ==
=== With Satyricon ===
- All Evil (EP) (1992)

=== With Ulver ===
- Vargnatt (Demo) (1993)

=== With Ved Buens Ende ===
- Those Who Caress the Pale (Demo) (1994)
- Written in Waters (1995)

=== With Aura Noir ===
- Dreams Like Deserts (EP) (1995)
- Black Thrash Attack (1996)
- Deep Tracts of Hell (1998)
- The Merciless (2004)
- Hades Rise (2008)
- Out to Die (2012)
- Aura Noire (2018)
- Belligerent 'Til Death (Single) (2019)

=== With Infernö ===
- Utter Hell (1996)
- Downtown Hades (1997)

=== With Dødheimsgard ===
- 666 International (1999)
- Supervillain Outcast (2007)

=== With Virus ===
- Carheart (2003)
- The Black Flux (2008)
- The Agent That Shapes the Desert (2011)
- Oblivion Clock (EP) (2012)
- Memento Collider (2016)
- Investigator (EP) (2017)

=== With Cadaver ===
- Discipline (2001)
- Necrosis (2004)

=== Guest appearances ===
- Fleurety, Department of Apocalyptic Affairs (2000)
- Ulver, Blood Inside (2005)
- Zweizz, The Yawn of the New Age (2007)
- Darkthrone, F.O.A.D. (2007)
- Hexvessel, Dawnbearer (2011)
