= Discipline (Cadaver Inc. album) =

Studio album by Cadaver Inc.
- Released: 2001
- Recorded: November–December 2000
- Genre: Death metal
- Length: 38:58
- Label: Earache
- Producer: Anders Odden

Cadaver Inc. chronology
...In Pains (1992)	Discipline (2001)	Necrosis (2004)

Professional ratings
Review scores
Source	Rating
Drowned in Sound	7/10

Discipline is the third album by the Norwegian death metal band Cadaver, but was released under the moniker Cadaver Inc. It is particularly notable for the vocal contributions of two Norwegian black metal figures - Bård "Faust" Eithun (ex-Emperor) and Fenriz (Darkthrone). Design and Illustration were by Justin Bartlett.

== Track listing ==
1. "Primal" – 2:27
2. "Deliverance" – 3:10
3. "Murderhead" – 3:14
4. "Rupture" – 3:21
5. "Die Like This" – 3:42
6. "Point Zero" – 4:10
7. "Killtech" – 3:40
8. "Reptile Robots" – 3:02
9. "Manic" – 3:24
10. "Snapper Organs" – 5:19
11. "Discipline" – 3:29

== Credits ==
- Apollyon - Vocals
- Neddo - Guitar
- L.J. Balvaz - Bass
- Czral - Drums
