= Monumental Possession =

Studio album by Dødheimsgard
- Released: 1996
- Recorded: 15–17 December 1995
- Genre: Black metal
- Length: 37:10
- Label: Malicious
- Producer: Dødheimsgard

Dødheimsgard chronology
Kronet Til Konge (1995)	Monumental Possession (1996)	Satanic Art (1998)

Professional ratings
Review scores
Source	Rating
AllMusic	3/5 stars

Monumental Possession is the second studio album by Norwegian black metal band Dødheimsgard. It was released in 1996, through the record label Malicious. It is their second and final completely black metal album, before the band incorporated industrial and avant-garde elements into their sound on future releases. Monumental Possession was re-released in 1999 by Century Media Records.

== Track listing ==
All lyrics written by Aldrahn.

1. "Intro" – 1:27
2. "Utopia Running Scarlet" – 3:23
3. "The Crystal Specter" – 3:50
4. "Bluebell Heart" – 4:16
5. "Monumental Possession" – 5:44
6. "Fluency" – 3:37
7. "Angel Death" – 3:54
8. "Lost in Faces" – 4:56
9. "The Ultimate Reflection" – 6:03

== Personnel ==
- Aldrahn – vocals, guitar
- Vicotnik – drums, vocals
- Jonas Alver – bass guitar
- Apollyon – guitar, vocals
