= Those Who Caress the Pale =

Those Who Caress the Pale (EP)

EP by Ved Buens Ende
- Released: 1997
- Genre: Black metal, experimental metal
- Length: 31:16
- Label: Misanthropy
- Producer: Ved Buens Ende

Ved Buens Ende chronology
Written in Waters (1995)	Those Who Caress the Pale (EP) (1997)

Professional ratings
Review scores
Source	Rating
Nordische Musik	5/6 stars

Those Who Caress the Pale is an EP by the Norwegian metal band Ved Buens Ende.

== Track listing ==
1. "A Mask in the Mirror" – 5:24
2. "The Carrier of Wounds" – 8:09
3. "You That May Wither" – 4:36
4. "The Plunderer" – 5:12
5. "Those Who Caress the Pale" – 6:17
6. "Insects (Part I)" – 1:38 (bonus track)

== Credits ==
- Vicotnik - Guitars, vocals
- Skoll - Bass, keyboards
- Carl-Michael Eide - Drums, vocals
