= Anders Odden =

Norwegian musician

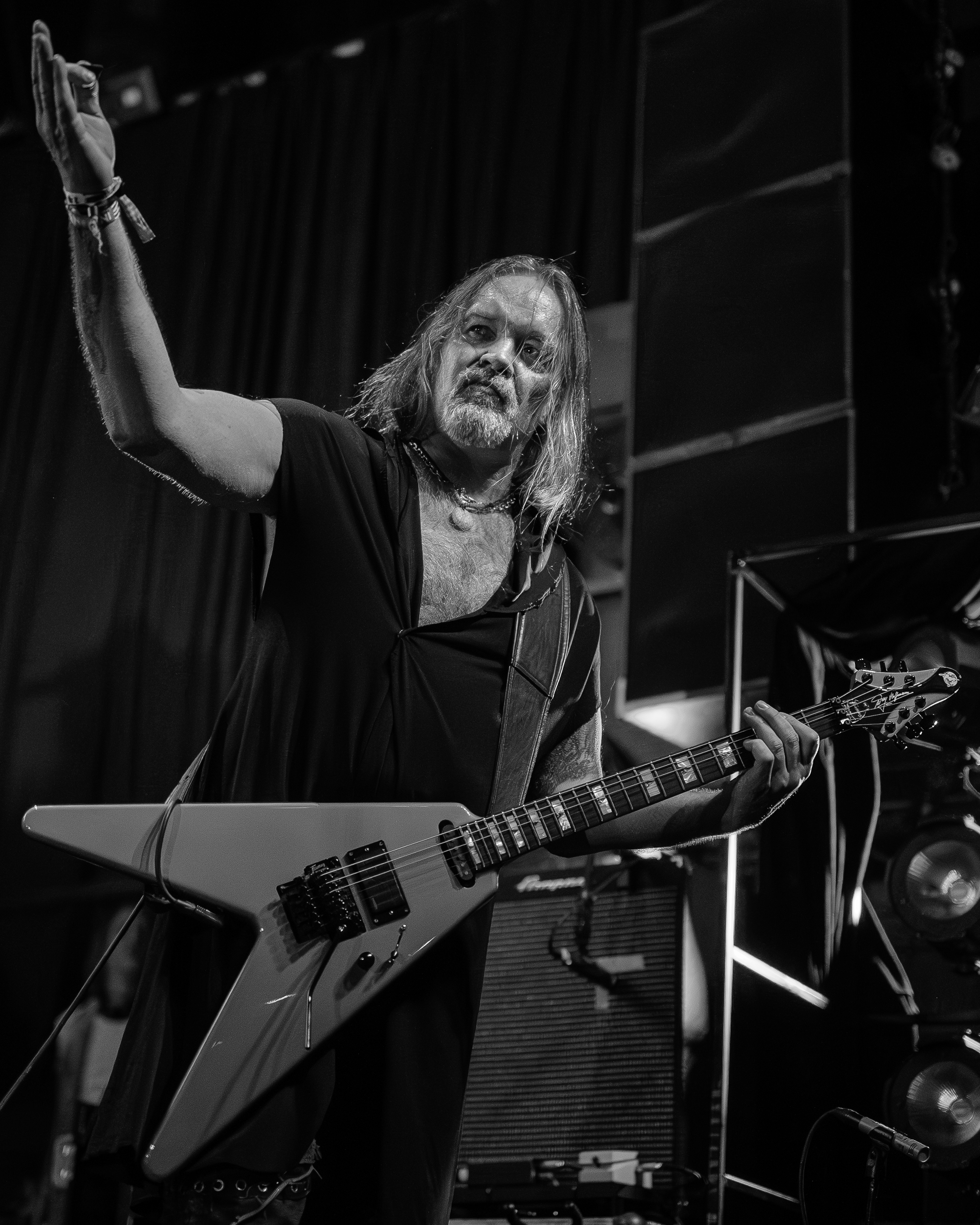
- Odden with Cadaver in 2025

Background information
- Born: 20 December 1972 (age 53); Stavanger, Norway
- Origin: Fredrikstad and Råde, Norway
- Genres: Black metal, death metal, heavy metal
- Occupation: Musician
- Instruments: Guitar, bass, vocals
- Years active: 1988–present
- Member of: Cadaver; Magenta; ORDER
- Formerly of: Slaught; Doctor Midnight & The Mercy Cult

Anders Odden (born 20 December 1972) is a Norwegian musician.

Odden is the co-founder and guitarist of the Norwegian death metal band Cadaver and is considered to be one of the pioneers of Norwegian metal.

Odden is also one of the founders of industrial rock band Magenta, heavy metal band Doctor Midnight & The Mercy Cult, and black metal band ORDER. He has been a member of synth-pop band Apoptygma Berzerk, a touring member of Satyricon and Celtic Frost, and appeared as a guest with several different bands including The Young Gods and Ministry.

In addition to his work as a musician, Odden has worked as a consultant in the music business, seminar speaker, tour manager, and festival and conference organizer.

== Early life ==
Odden was born in Stavanger and grew up in Fredrikstad and Råde. His first connection to music came through his father's collection of classical music and he was unaware of rock music until the age of seven, when he discovered Kiss.

== Career ==
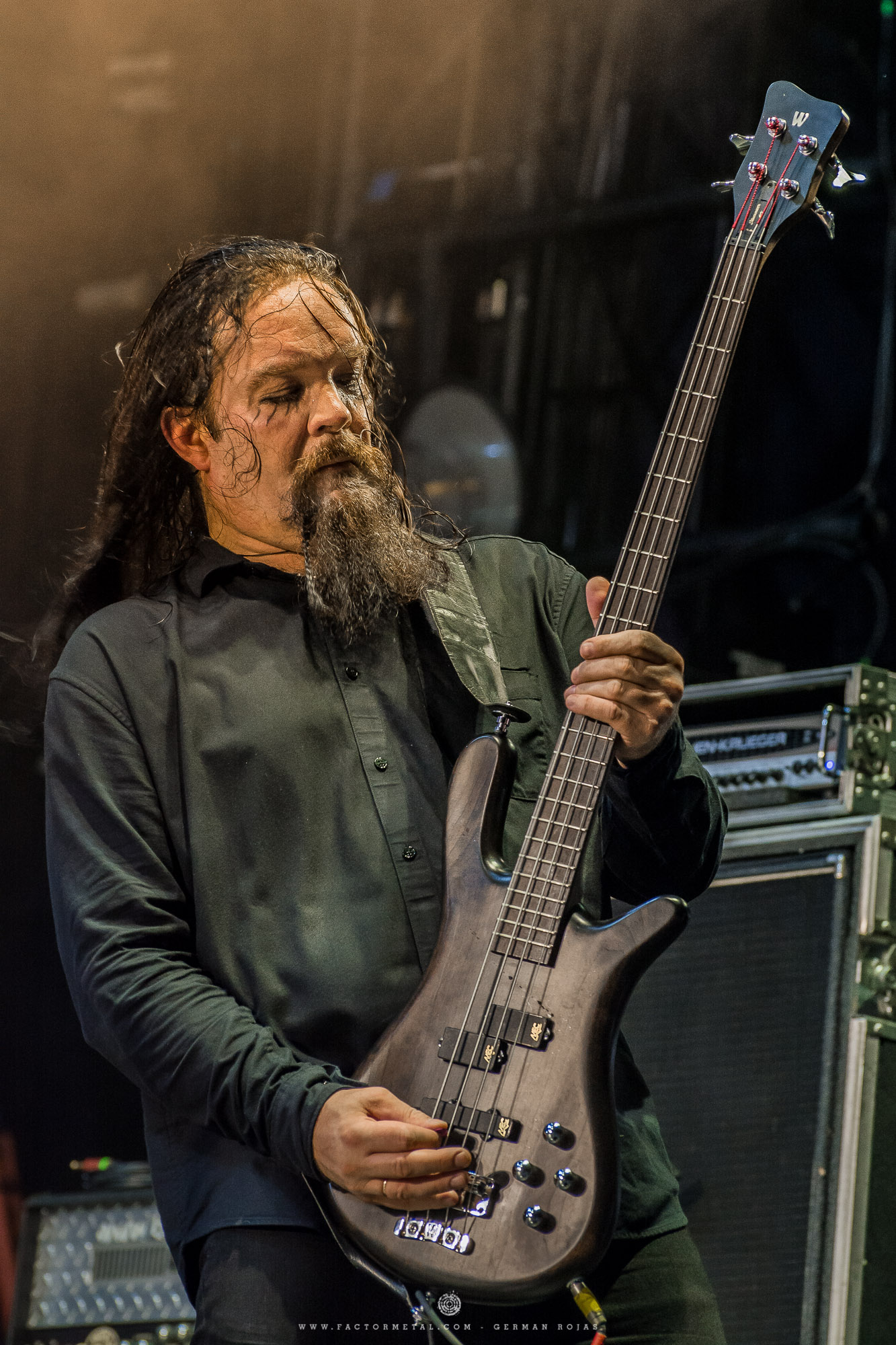
Odden with Satyricon in 2017

Odden started his musical career in the mid-1980s. In 1988, he founded one of Norway's first – and, by 2026, still going strong – death metal bands, Cadaver.

He went on to form the industrial rock duo Magenta in 1995, as an outlet for other musical ideas. The other half of the duo is his wife, Vilde Lockert; their daughter Regine has also contributed as a songwriter and vocalist.

Odden was a live guitarist for Celtic Frost from 2006 to 2007 and toured Europe, USA, Canada and Japan with the band as part of their Monotheist Tour.

He was a member of the short-lived (2009–2011) Scandinavian heavy metal-supergroup Doctor Midnight & The Mercy Cult.

In 2013, he founded the black metal band ORDER together with former Mayhem members Manheim and Messiah, and former Cadaver member Rene Jansen. Following Jansen's death in December 2014, ORDER recruited Stu Manx (ex-Gluecifer) in August 2015 and released their debut album in 2017.

Throughout the 1990s and 2000s, Odden worked as a consultant for music organizations in Norway, including RIO, GramArt, MIC and MFO (Musicians Union in Norway). He is the founder of the music business seminar IMC, which is held during the annual Inferno Festival in Oslo, Norway.

In 2011, Odden released his autobiography, Piratliv.

In 2024, Odden and singer Benedicte Adrian competed at the Melodi Grand Prix 2024, the Norwegian selection for the Eurovision Song Contest 2024, under the name Mistra with the song "Waltz of Death".

== Discography ==
=== Cadaver ===
Studio albums

- Hallucinating Anxiety (1990)
- ...In Pains (1992)
- Discipline (2001)
- Necrosis (2004)
- D.G.A.F. (2020)
- Edder & Bile (2020)
- The Age Of The Offended (2023)

Live albums

- Live Inferno (2002)

EPs

- Primal (1999)

=== Magenta ===
Studio albums

- Periode (1998)
- Little Girl Lost (2002)
- Art and Accidents (2009)
- Magenta Aus Norwegen (2012)
- Songs for the Dead (2015)

EPs

- Magenta (1997)

=== Doctor Midnight & The Mercy Cult ===
Studio albums

- I Declare: Treason (2011)

=== ORDER ===
Studio album

- Lex Amentiae (2017)
- The Gospel (2021)
