= ...In Pains =

Studio album by Cadaver
- Released: September 14, 1992 (UK) November 17, 1992 (US)
- Recorded: April–May 1992
- Genre: Death metal
- Length: 44:52
- Label: Relativity/Earache
- Producer: Ketil Kællen Johansen

Cadaver chronology
Hallucinating Anxiety (1990)	...In Pains (1992)	Discipline (2001)

...In Pains is the second album by the Norwegian death metal band Cadaver. It was released in 1992, by Earache Records.

== Reception ==
Sputnikmusic rated the album 4.0, noting "Basically, it rocks."

== Track listing ==
No.	Title	Length
1.	"Bypassed"	3:35
2.	"Mr. Tumour's Misery"	4:27
3.	"Into the Outside"	5:06
4.	"Blurred Visions"	4:29
5.	"Runaway Brain"	4:31
6.	"Inner Persecution"	4:58
7.	"In Distortion"	2:57
8.	"The Misanthrope"	4:18
9.	"Ins-Through-Mental"	4:10
10.	"During the End"	6:21
Total length:		45:52

== Personnel ==
- Anders Odden – Guitar, Effects
- Eilert Solstad – Bass guitar, double bass
- Ole Bjerkebakke – Vocals, Drums, Flute
