= The Yawn of the New Age =

The Yawn of The New Age

Studio album by Zweizz
- Released: March 24, 2007
- Genre: IDM; Noise music Black metal
- Length: 48:17
- Label: Vendlus Records
- Producer: Svein Egil Hatlevik

The Yawn of the New Age is the debut album by the Norwegian electronic/noise/avant-garde metal artist Zweizz.

All music and lyrics are created by Svein Egil Hatlevik, except "Blacker Than Darkness", which is an adaptation of the song by the same title, written by Norwegian black metal group Immortal.

== Critical reception ==
The Yawn of the New Age has been met with reviews ranging from very favourable to very unfavourable.

Pitchfork's monthly metal columnist, Brandon Stosuy belonged to the enthusiasts: "Hatlevik's one of the most compelling musicians (and minds) in this realm today...check it out."

Decibel magazine gave the album 8 points out of 10, writing: "It’s been a while since black metal questioned itself like Zweizz is doing here, and in a BM scene so awash with turgid, unthinking revivalism (and lame bands), it’s nice to know the fringes of extremity can always be counted on to keep things interesting. And pink."

In ink19.com, reviewer Matthew Moyer wrote the following: "The Yawn of the New Age is not metal. It doesn't owe anything to anybody. You want your Crowleyan freedom? Here it is, and it's already set your house on fire and stolen your car keys and your Tamagotchis while you weren't paying attention. You can't even call Yawn noise music, that's way too restrictive and regressively macho for the mischievous sonic riddles and puzzle boxes that former DHG keyboardist and black metal musician Svein Egil Hatlevik have painstakingly constructed."

Ignacio Coluccio of the webzine maelstrom.nu gave the album 6.6 out of 10, and concluded: "In the end, The Yawn of the New Age is a good album with some horrible tracks and some great ones; an album that will surely be a hit-or-miss with inexperienced people, while people with more varied taste will probably understand for what it is: nothing exceedingly weird, but definitely a good try."

The online underground publication Heathen Harvest trashed the album, saying, "Part of me wants to consider this album a joke. The Yawn of a New Age is no doubt about how boring music in general has become these days, but I can name a thousand electronic, ambient, and industrial acts that are better than this."

One of the most scathing reviews was published at Encyclopaedia Metallum: "It's quite clear that Zweizz takes experimental music to a new level in which no backbone or intelligence is displayed. I keep hearing about Zweizz's new breed of avant-garde, but let's get real: a bored teenager could poop out something like this in a few hours."

== Track listing ==
1. "The Yawn of the New Age" - 04:45
2. "Rævkjørt" - 02:04
3. "Nowadays Only the Boring Everything Is So Frustrating" - 03:53
4. "Blacker Than Darkness" - 02:34
5. "Thank You in the Face" - 05:17
6. "Your System Sucks" - 04:57
7. "Sawbeam" - 02:02
8. "Catacomb" - 03:58
9. "Hommage a Knutsen & Ludvigsen" - 03:25
10. "Masturbatory Attention Deficit Disorder" - 02:13
11. "Musick Is Organized Sound" - 03:45
12. "Big Black Dick" - 04:16
13. "Amateurs" - 05:07

== Credits ==
- Svein Egil Hatlevik - Computers, Vocals, piano.
- Gamle Kripos - Bass on tracks #1, 7, 9 and 11.
- Homo Vinter - Drums and programming on track #4.
- Czral Guitars on track # 6.
- Kjetil S. Matheussen - Computer processing on track #13.
