= Hallucinating Anxiety =

Studio album by Cadaver
- Released: December 3, 1990
- Genre: Death metal
- Length: 39:23
- Label: Necrosis
- Producer: Ketil Kællen Johansen

Cadaver chronology
Hallucinating Anxiety (1990)	...In Pains (1992)

Hallucinating Anxiety is the debut album by the Norwegian death metal band Cadaver. It was released in 1990 through Necrosis, a sub-label of Earache Records run by members of popular grindcore/death metal band Carcass. The LP and MC were the only versions to be released individually (and with all tracks), whereas the only CD version was a split with Carnage's only album, Dark Recollections, which omitted the track "Hypertrophyan" due to time constraints.

== Track listing ==
1. "Tuba (Intro) / Ignominious Eczema" (Note: Listed as separate tracks) – 5:09
2. "Corrosive Delirium" – 2:56
3. "Erosive Fester" (Note: Not listed) – 2:42
4. "Hallucinating Anxiety" – 3:44
5. "Cannibalistic Dissection" – 2:46
6. "Hypertrophyan" (not on CD version) – 3:18
7. "Petrifyed Faces" – 2:46
8. "Innominate" – 3:32
9. "Twisted Collapse" – 2:19
10. "Abnormal Deformity" – 3:18
11. "Maelstrom" – 3:29
12. "Mental Abherrance" – 2:32
13. "Bodily Trauma" – 4:10
