= Necrosis (album) =

Studio album by Cadaver
- Released: 2004
- Recorded: June 2003–January 2004
- Genre: Death metal
- Length: 34:52
- Label: Candlelight
- Producer: Bjørn Boge

Cadaver chronology
Discipline (2001)	Necrosis (2004)	Edder & Bile (2020)

Professional ratings
Review scores
Source	Rating
Allmusic	3/5 stars

Necrosis is the fourth studio album by the Norwegian death metal band Cadaver. A video was released for the song "Decomposed Metal Skin". Design and Illustration is by Justin Bartlett.

== Track listing ==
1. "Necro as Fuck" – 3:24
2. "Decomposed Metal Skin" – 3:22
3. "Evil Is Done" – 5:00
4. "Odium" – 4:32
5. "Awakening" – 3:53
6. "Goatfather" – 3:43
7. "Unholy Death" – 2:47
8. "The Etching Cleanser" – 3:38
9. "Heartworm" – 4:33

== Credits ==
- Apollyon - Vocals, Bass
- Neddo - Guitar
- L.J. Balvaz - Guitar
- Czral - Drums
- Bjørn Boge (a.k.a. Ursus Major) (a.k.a. Bjørn Bogus) - Engineering, mixing and production at Sound Residence Studios, Oslo, Norway
- Bredo Myrvang - Assistant engineering
- Øystein Boge - Drum technician
- Audun Strype - Mastering at Strype Audio, Oslo, Norway
