= A Umbra Omega =

Studio album by Dødheimsgard
- Released: March 16, 2015
- Studio: Supervillain HQ
- Genres: Avant-garde metal, black metal
- Length: 67:10
- Label: Peaceville Records
- Producer: Yusaf Parvez

Dødheimsgard chronology
Supervillain Outcast (2007)	A Umbra Omega (2015)	Black Medium Current (2023)

Professional ratings
Review scores
Source	Rating
Louder Sound	4/5 stars
Metal Injection	7/10

A Umbra Omega is the fifth full-length album by Norwegian black metal band Dødheimsgard, also known as DHG. It was released on March 16, 2015, by Peaceville Records.

== Track listing ==
All tracks are written by Yusaf "Vicotnik" Parvez, except where noted.

No.	Title	Lyrics	Length
1.	"The Love Divine" (instrumental)		1:03
2.	"Aphelion Void"		15:14
3.	"God Protocol Axiom"		13:13
4.	"The Unlocking"	Aldrahn	11:21
5.	"Architect of Darkness"		11:59
6.	"Blue Moon Duel"	Aldrahn; Olivier Côté	14:20
Total length:			67:10

== Personnel ==
Dødheimsgard

- Yusaf "Vicotnik" Parvez – guitars, bass, keyboards, engineering, mixing, production
- Bjørn "Aldrahn" Gjerde – vocals
- John "Sekaran" Vooren – drums

Additional personnel

- Lars-Emil Måløy – bass ("The Unlocking", "Blue Moon Duel")
- Tom Kvålsvoll – mastering
