= Ved Buens Ende =

Norwegian avant-garde metal band

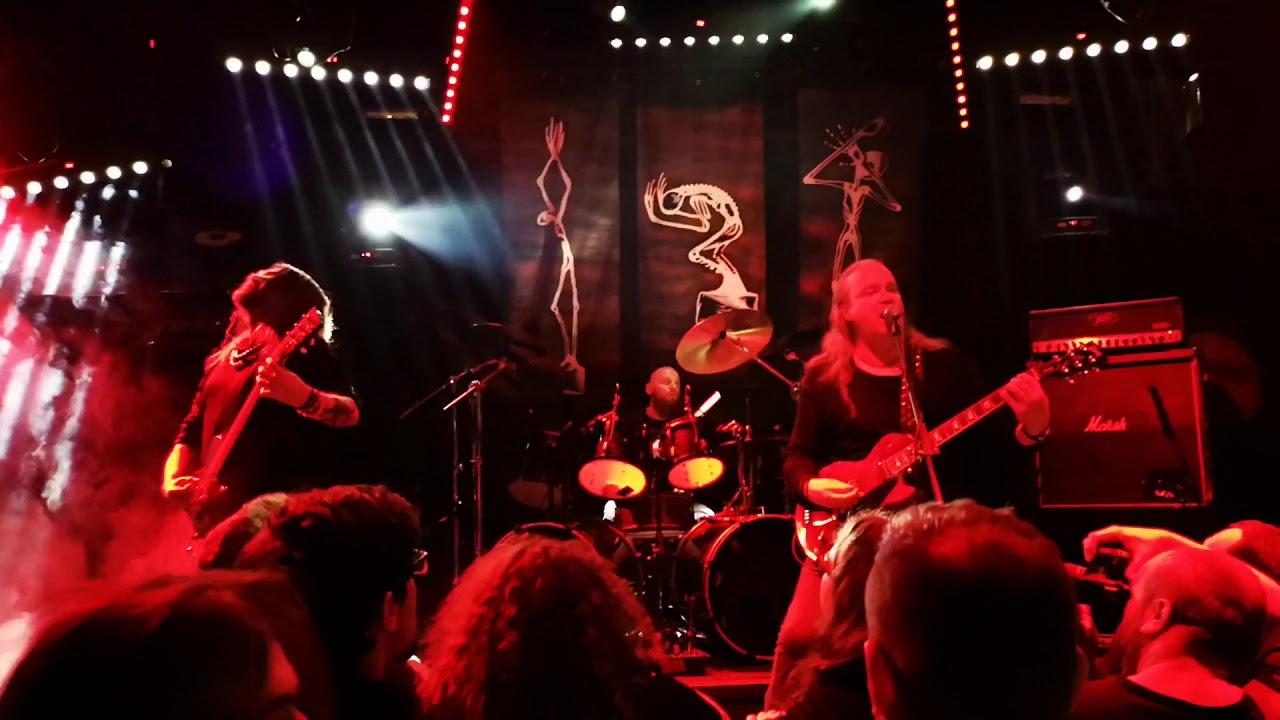

Background information
- Origin: Oslo, Norway
- Genres: Black metal, avant-garde metal
- Years active: 1993–1997, 2006–2007, 2019–present
- Label: Misanthropy Records
- Past members: Skoll; Vicotnik; Carl-Michael Eide; Plenum; Esso

Ved Buens Ende is a Norwegian avant-garde metal band. Their sound is diverse with quiet instrumental jazz influenced sections and aggressive black metal blast beats and vocals. Ved Buens Ende means "At the end of the arc" referring to the mythological rainbow Bifröst.

== History ==
Ved Buens Ende was formed in Oslo in 1993 by the drummer Carl-Michael Eide and guitarist Vicotnik, who were then joined by bassist Skoll. Prior to this, Carl-Michael Eide had been playing in Ulver and Vicotnik in his own project Manes which eventually became Ved Buens Ende, not to be confused with other Norwegian band Manes, known as Perifa, and later, Manii. They were signed to the British label Misanthropy Records. The band mixed many unusual musical elements for metal, such as atonality and dissonance, a very prominent bass sound as well as Eide's crooning and Vicotnik's characteristic shrieks.

The band split up in 1997, after releasing only one album, Written in Waters.

On 26 April 2006, Blabbermouth.net announced that Ved Buens Ende had reformed, and were working on new material.

Along with Vicotnik and Carl-Michael Eide, who now plays guitar instead of drums, there are two new members; Petter "Plenum" Berntsen on bass and Einar "Esso" Sjursø on drums. They are also members of Carl-Michael Eide's band Virus. Many fans of the band were surprised by the absence of Hugh Mingay (aka Skoll), whose place was taken by Petter Berntsen.

The band's drummer, Einar Sjursø, had this to say about the band on Blabbermouth.net: "We will record a new album this year, to be released in 2007 by an as-yet-undetermined label (interested parties get in touch) and we also aim at playing live, where we will perform material both from 'Written In Waters' and the [post-VED BUENS ENDE project] VIRUS 'Carheart' album plus of course new compositions. The new material is being developed at the moment and will differ from both 'Written In Waters' and 'Carheart' yet still retain the trademark off the wall guitar sounds of those releases."

The band broke up again in early 2007, without having released another album. Several songs intended for this album ultimately appeared on Virus' The Black Flux.

As of 2019, they have reunited again. The current lineup is Skoll on bass, Carl-Michael Eide on guitars/clean vocals, Vicotnik on guitars/harsh vocals, and Øyvind Myrvoll on drums.

== Discography ==
- Those Who Caress the Pale (demo) – 1994
- Written in Waters (demo) – 1995
- Written in Waters – 1995
- Those Who Caress the Pale (EP) – 1997

== Members ==
- Yusaf "Vicotnik" Parvez - harsh vocals, electric guitar
- Hugh "Skoll" Mingay - bass guitar, keyboards (1993-1997)
- Carl-Michael Eide - drums, percussion (1994-1997), clean vocals, electric guitar (1994-1997, 2006-2007)
- Petter "Plenum" Berntsen - bass guitar (2006-2007)
- Einar "Esso" Sjursø - drums, percussion (2006-2007)

== Sources ==
- Ved Buens Ende at AllMusic
- Ved Buens Ende at Rate Your Music
- Interview with Vicotnik about Ved Buens Ende, July 2007
- Interview with Carl-Michael Eide, December 2008
