= Zweizz =

Norwegian musician and composer

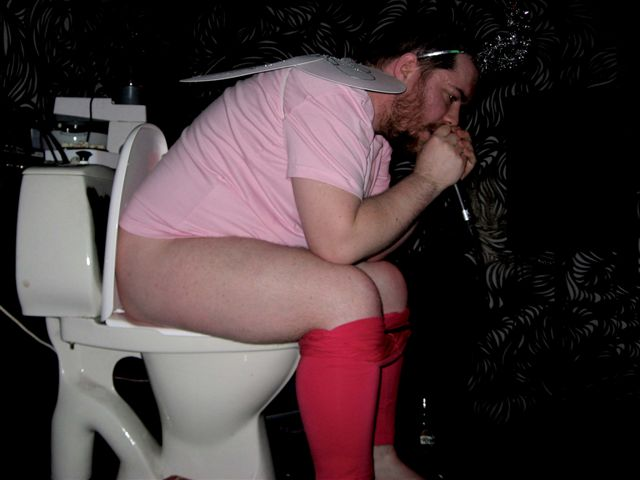
- Zweizz live 2007

Background information
- Origin: Oslo, Norway
- Genres: IDM; Noise; Electroacoustic music Black metal Experimental metal
- Years active: 2003–present
- Label: Jester Records
- Member of: Fleurety, Pronounced "SEX", Umoral
- Formerly of: Dødheimsgard
- Members: Svein Egil Hatlevik

Zweizz is the primary performing alias of Norwegian musician and composer Svein Egil Hatlevik (born May 27, 1977).

== History ==
Hatlevik started using the Zweizz alias in 2003 after leaving the Norwegian black metal group Dødheimsgard. According to Hatlevik, Zweizz should be considered a one-man band, not a solo project. Hatlevik defines the musical style of Zweizz as a mixture of IDM, noise, electroacoustic music and black metal.

Hatlevik also uses the pseudonym Zweizz in other bands which he is also a member of, such as Umoral and Pronounced "Sex". As a member of Dødheimsgard he used the aliases "Hologram" and "Magic/Logic".

The first Zweizz release was the 7-inch EP Black Necrotic Obfuscation, issued through Vendlus Records in 2004. On March 24, 2007, Zweizz released his debut album The Yawn of the New Age, also through Vendlus Records. Later the same year Epicene Sound Systems released an untitled Zweizz cassette EP in a limited quantity of 30 copies. Side B of this release is built entirely from recordings of the Soviet ANS synthesizer.

In 2011, the Norwegian record company Jester Records released the album Zweizz & Joey Hopkins that Hatlevik had been making with the late US composer and musician Joey Hopkins before the death of the latter in 2008.

Hatlevik is also a founding member of the avant-garde metal group Fleurety.

== Discography ==
=== As Zweizz ===
- Black Necrotic Obfuscation (EP, Vendlus Records) – (2004)
- The Yawn of the New Age (Full length, Vendlus Records) – (2007)
- Untitled (Cassette, Epicene Sound Systems) – (2007)

=== Split releases ===
- Kringsatt av fiender (Split with RU-486, Cassette, Destructive Industries) – (2009)

=== Cooperation projects ===
- "Shiva Gives Me a Hand Whenever I Need One, Then I Fuck the Bitch" on an untitled EP in cooperation with Winters in Osaka (2008)
- Zweizz & Joey Hopkins (Full length, Jester Records) – (2011)

=== Guest appearances ===
- "Cynic" and "Whore" on Demo I by Dementia Absurda (2007)
- "Satyr's Birth" on the EP Red Tooth, Red Claw by Winters in Osaka (2008)
- "The Shift" on the album Zoom Code by ThanatoSchizO (2008).
- "He Came as Swarms" on the album The Silver Hour by Swarms (2008).
- "Swarming Locusts" and "Submission to Falsities" on the album Syndicate of Lethargy by Execration (2008).

=== Remixes ===
- "Kledt i nattens farget" from the tribute album My Own Wolf: A New Approach (2007)
- "There Is Need – The Extreme Zweizz Fuckover" featured on the remix album The Circular Drain by Solefald (2008).

=== With Dødheimsgard ===
- Satanic Art (Mini CD) (1998)
- 666 International (1999)

=== With Fleurety ===
- Black Snow (Demo) – (1993)
- A Darker Shade of Evil (EP) – (1994)
- Min Tid Skal Komme (Full length) – (1995)
- Last-Minute Lies (EP) – (1999)
- Department of Apocalyptic Affairs – (2000)
- Min Tid Skal Komme (Reissue) – (2003)
- Ingentes Atque Decorii Vexilliferi Apokalypsis – (2009)
- Evoco Bestias – (2010)
- Et Spiritus Meus Semper Sub Sanguinantibus Stellis Habitabit – (2013)
- Fragmenta Cuinsvis Aetatis Contemporaneae – (2017)
- The White Death – (2017)

=== With Pronounced "Sex" ===
- XXX (Interregnum Records) – (2008)

=== With Stagnant Waters ===
- Stagnant Waters (Adversum) – (2012)

=== With Succuba ===
- Black Pizza (Handmade Records) - (2016)

=== With Umoral ===
- Untitled (EP, Vendlus Records) – (2007)

== Line-up ==
- Svein Egil Hatlevik – Computer, Vocals (Fleurety, Umoral, Pronounced "Sex", ex-Dødheimsgard)
