= Weltherrschaft =

EP by Mezzerschmitt
- Released: 2002
- Genre: Black metal, industrial metal
- Length: 17:58
- Label: Season of Mist

Weltherrschaft is the first EP and sole release by the black metal band Mezzerschmitt. It was released in 2002 on Season of Mist productions. Weltherrschaft is a German word and translates to "World Domination".

== Track listing ==
No.	Title	Length
1.	"Feuerzauber"	4:18
2.	"Unter der Fahne"	4:52
3.	"Die Nacht hat Augen"	4:29
4.	"Weltherrschaft"	4:19
