= Satanic Art =

EP by Dødheimsgard
- Released: May 1998
- Recorded: March 1996 (track 4), mid-1997
- Studio: BBM Studio
- Genre: Black metal, industrial metal
- Length: 15:59
- Label: Moonfog
- Producer: Bjørn Boge, Dødheimsgard

Dødheimsgard chronology
Monumental Possession (1996)	Satanic Art (1998)	666 International (1999)

Satanic Art is an EP by Norwegian black metal band Dødheimsgard. It was released in May 1998, by Moonfog Productions. Satanic Art marks the beginning of Dødheimsgard's transition from black metal to a more industrial/avant-garde sound, which was not fully realized until their next album, 666 International (1999).

It was Dødheimsgard's first release to feature Svein Egil Hatlevik (Fleurety) on keyboards, their only one to feature Galder (Dimmu Borgir, Old Man's Child) on guitars and the last to feature Cerberus on bass.

The samples used in the songs "Traces of Reality" and "Wrapped in Plastic" are both taken from the TV series Twin Peaks.

== Critical reception ==
Professional ratings
Review scores
Source	Rating
AllMusic	4/5 stars

William York of AllMusic said the album is "more than just a transitional effort, Satanic Art stands on its own as a daring, defiant piece of work".

== Track listing ==
All lyrics are written by Aldrahn; all music is composed by Vicotnik.

No.	Title	Length
1.	"Oneiroscope" (instrumental)	1:31
2.	"Traces of Reality"	7:07
3.	"Symptom"	2:31
4.	"The Paramount Empire"	3:10
5.	"Wrapped in Plastic" (instrumental)	1:40

== Personnel ==
=== Dødheimsgard ===
- Mr. Always Safe and Sound/Aldrahn (Bjørn Dencker Gjerde) – guitars, vocals
- Mr. Anti-Evolution Human Deviation/Galder (Thomas Rune Andersen Orre) – guitars
- Mr. Dingy Sweet Talker Women Stalker/Hologram (Svein Egil Hatlevik) – keyboards
- Mr. Nebulous Secrets/Apollyon (Ole Jørgen Moe) – drums, percussion
- Mr. Dead Meat Smelly Feet/Cerberus – bass
- Mr. Fantastic Deceptionist/Vicotnik (Yusaf Parvez) – guitars, programming, vocals (4)

=== Additional personnel ===
- Stine Lunde – violins (2)
- Garm (Kristoffer Rygg) – mastering
- Tom "Thrawn" Kvålsvoll – mastering
- Bjørn Boge – production, engineering, mixing
- Bjørn Werner – additional mixing
