= Aura Noir =

Norwegian black/thrash metal band

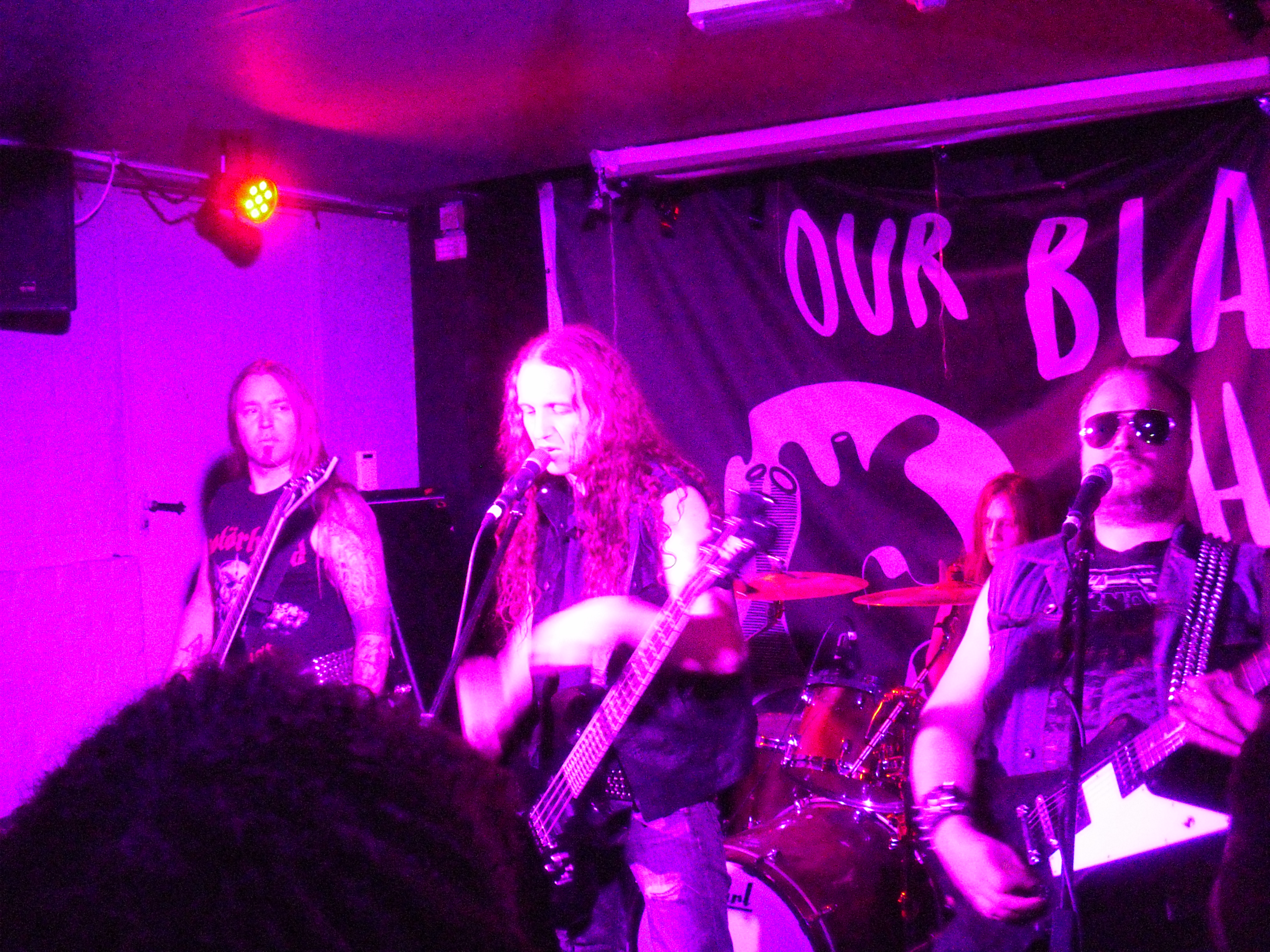
- Aura Noir performing in 2012

Background information
- Origin: Kolbotn, Norway
- Genres: Black metal; thrash metal
- Years active: 1993–present
- Labels: Tyrant Syndicate Productions, Indie Recordings
- Members: Apollyon; Aggressor; Blasphemer

Aura Noir are a Norwegian black/thrash metal band from Oslo. They are influenced by Voivod, Slayer, Sodom and Kreator. The band's lyrics focus on blasphemy, death, and aggression.

== History ==
Aura Noir was formed in 1993 by Aggressor (Carl-Michael Eide) and Apollyon (Ole Jørgen Moe). The band recorded several demos before releasing the EP Dreams Like Deserts in 1995. In 1996, they were joined by Mayhem guitarist Blasphemer (Rune Eriksen), who contributed to the release of their debut album, Black Thrash Attack, that year. The band released their sophomore album, Deep Tracts of Hell, in 1998. In 2004, Aura Noir were the first band to sign to Tyrant Syndicate Productions, a sub-label of Peaceville Records, run by Nocturno Culto and Fenriz of Darkthrone. They released their next album, The Merciless, which featured Nattefrost of Carpathian Forest and Fenriz on guest vocals, in October 2004.

The band was put on hold after Aggressor fell ten metres from a fourth floor window and landed on his legs in late March 2005. In May 2006, Aggressor appeared as a guest in the Norwegian radio programme Tinitus, where he confirmed that he was paralyzed from the ankles down. Despite the injury, the band released the album Hades Rise on 25 August 2008. Aura Noir toured in 2010 with a replacement drummer and was joined by Aggressor on vocals for several songs at the Inferno and Party.San festivals in 2011. He has rejoined the band as a full-time recording and touring member on guitar and vocals, sitting and standing with the help of a stool. The band signed with Norwegian Indie Recordings in 2012 and released their fifth studio album, Out to Die, on 23 March 2012. Their sixth studio album, Aura Noire, was released on 27 April 2018.

== Members ==
- Aggressor (Carl-Michael Eide) – vocals, guitars, bass (1993–present), drums (1993–2005)
- Apollyon (Ole Jørgen Moe) – vocals, guitars, bass, drums (1993–present)
- Blasphemer (Rune Eriksen) – guitars (1996–present)
Aura Noir live at Haugesund, Norway, 12 February 2012

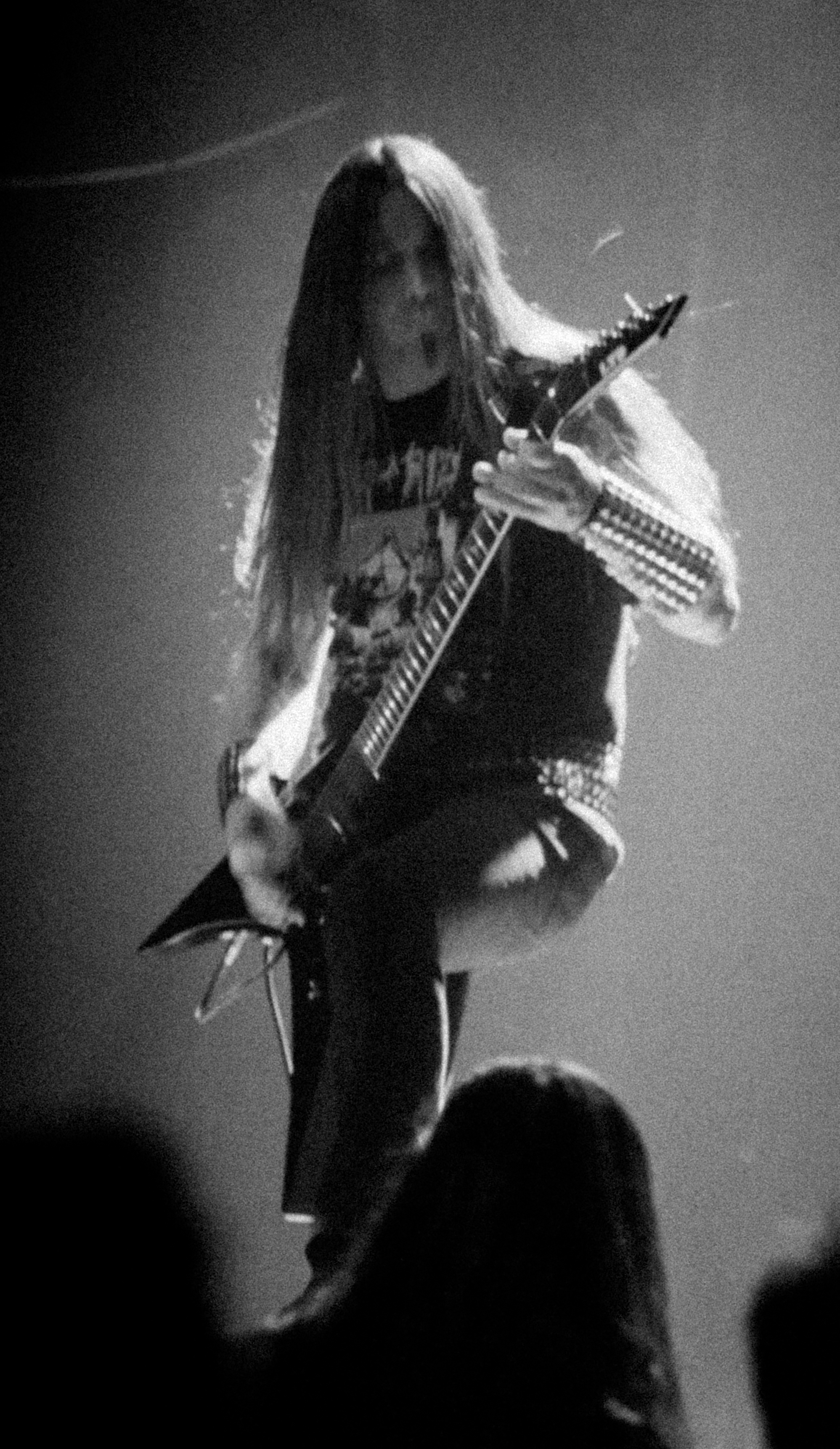
Blasphemer

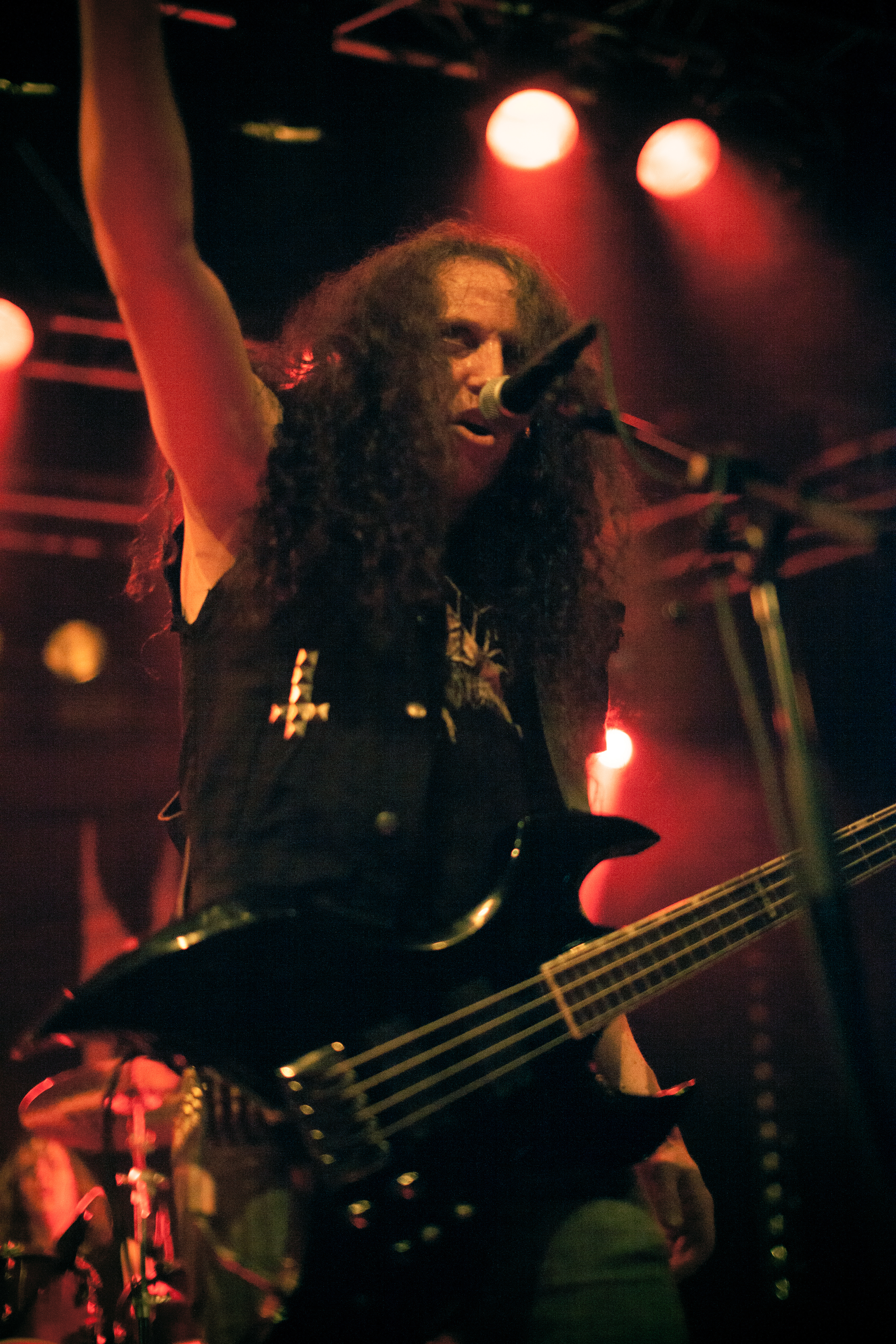
Apollyon

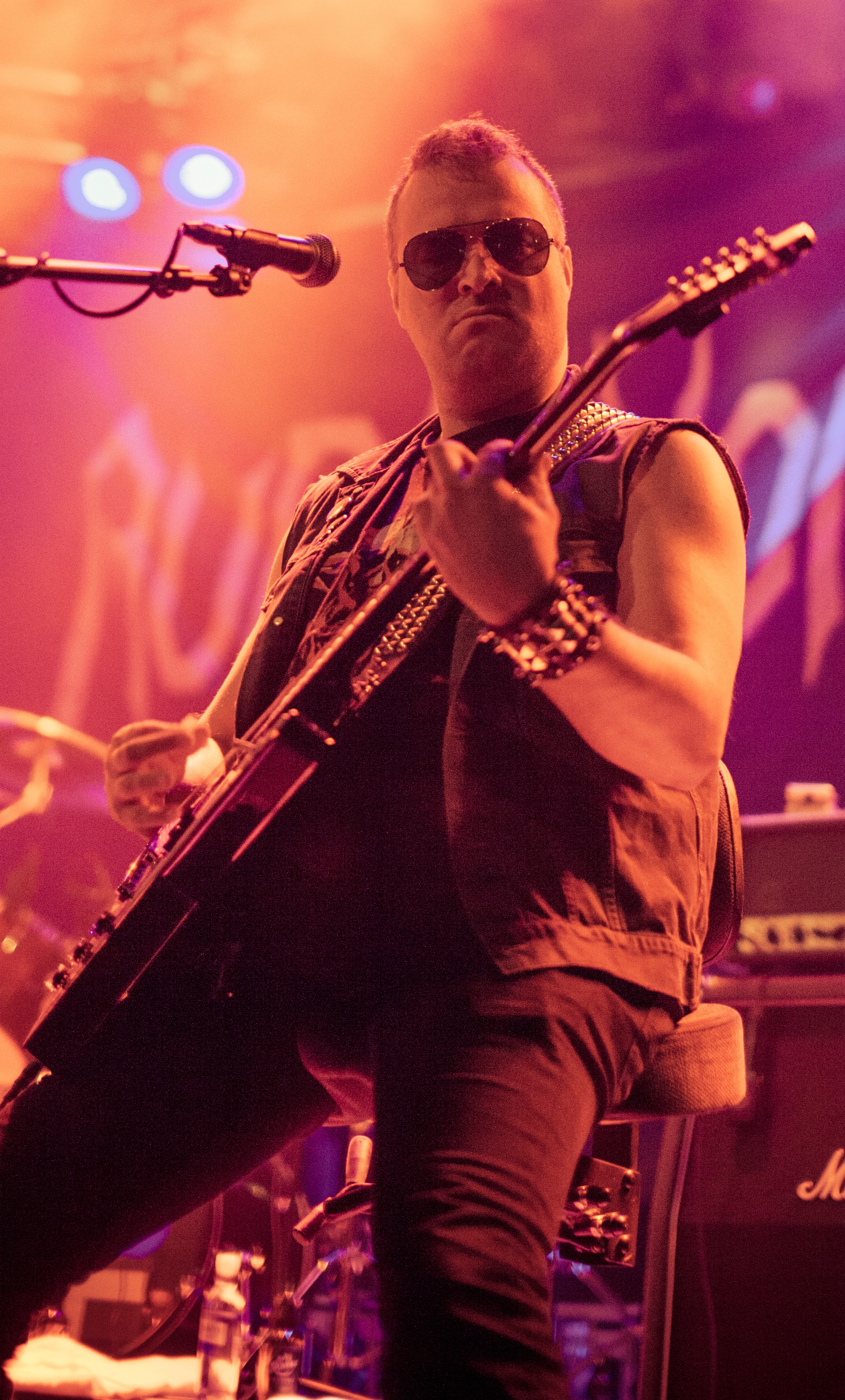
Aggressor

== Discography ==
Studio albums

- Black Thrash Attack (1996)
- Deep Tracts of Hell (1998)
- The Merciless (2004)
- Hades Rise (2008)
- Out to Die (2012)
- Aura Noire (2018)

Studio EPs

- Dreams Like Deserts (1995)

Compilations

- Increased Damnation (2000)
- Deep Dreams of Hell (2005)

Demos

- Untitled (1993)
- Two Voices, One King (1994)

Split albums

- Überthrash (2004, 4-way split with Audiopain, Infernö and Nocturnal Breed)
- Überthrash II (2005, 4-way split with Audiopain, Infernö and Nocturnal Breed)
