= Rune Eriksen =

Norwegian guitarist

- Eriksen at Tons of Rock in 2026

Background information
- Also known as: Blasphemer; Herr Schmitt
- Born: 13 January 1975 (age 51)
- Origin: Norway
- Genres: Black metal; thrash metal; doom metal; death metal
- Occupations: Musician; songwriter
- Instruments: Guitar; bass; vocals
- Years active: 1990–present
- Member of: Aura Noir; RUÏM; Earth Electric; Twilight Of The Gods; Vltimas
- Formerly of: Mayhem; Mezzerschmitt; Nader Sadek; Ava Inferi

Rune Eriksen (born 13 January 1975), also known by his stage name Blasphemer, is a Norwegian musician best known as the former guitarist and songwriter of black metal band Mayhem. He took his stage name from a Sodom song and joined Mayhem in October 1994, before departing the band in late 2008. Eriksen founded his solo project RUÏM in 2020 and is currently a member of Aura Noir, Earth Electric, and the multinational bands Twilight Of The Gods and Vltimas, the former initially being a Bathory tribute band and the latter being a supergroup with former Morbid Angel vocalist David Vincent and drummer Flo Mounier of Cryptopsy. Eriksen and Mounier has previously been a part of death metal artist Nader Sadek's band along with Steve Tucker of Morbid Angel. Eriksen has also been a live member of Gaahls Wyrd and made guest appearances on recordings by Absu, Negură Bunget and Root. His former bands and projects include Mezzerschmitt and the Portuguese gothic doom band Ava Inferi. Eriksen has resided in Portugal since 2004.

Eriksen has been noted by critics for his technical proficiency. Jillian Drachman of Loudwire included him on her list of the "11 best black metal guitarists of all time."

== Discography ==
=== With Mayhem ===
- Wolf's Lair Abyss (1997)
- Mediolanum Capta Est (1999)
- Grand Declaration of War (2000)
- Live in Marseilles (2002)
- Chimera (2004)
- Ordo Ad Chao (2007)

=== With Aura Noir ===
- Black Thrash Attack (1996)
- The Merciless (2004)
- Hades Rise (2008)
- Out to Die (2012)
- Aura Noire (2018)

=== With Mezzerschmitt ===
- Weltherrschaft (2002)

=== With Ava Inferi ===
- Burdens (2006)
- The Silhouette (2007)
- Blood of Bacchus (2009)
- Onyx (2011)

=== With Nader Sadek ===
- In the Flesh (2011)
- Living Flesh (2013)
- The Malefic: Chapter III (2014)

=== With Twilight Of The Gods ===
- Fire on the Mountain (2013)

=== With Earth Electric ===
- Vol. 1: Solar (2017)

=== With Vltimas ===
- Something Wicked Marches In (2019)
- EPIC (2024)

=== With RUÏM ===
- Black Royal Spiritism – I.O Sino Da Igreja (2023)
