= Carmen Susana Simões =

Portuguese singer and lyricist

- Born: 8 March 1973 (age 53)
- Origin: Portugal
- Genres: Gothic metal, doom metal, ethereal wave, dark wave
- Occupation: Musician
- Instrument: vocals
- Years active: 1990s–present

Carmen Susana Simões (born 8 March 1973, in Lisbon, Portugal) is a Portuguese singer and lyricist of darkwave and gothic music, characterized by a melancholic mezzo-soprano voice.

Carmen began her musical career in local Gothic rock bands known as 'Poetry of Shadows' and 'Isiphilon'. In 1997, Carmen soon became the lead singer of the prestigious darkwave band Aenima. As of 2005, next to the award-winning musician Rune Eriksen, she became the vocalist for the Doom metal band Ava Inferi, where she would also participate in a Moonspell album, in 2007.

As of 2013, Rune Eriksen and Carmen Susana Simões announced the disbandment of Ava Inferi.

== Discography ==
with
Isiphilon

- Essence (1997)

with
Aenima

- Revolutions (1999)
- Never Fragile – EP (2002)
- Sentient (2003)

with
Ava Inferi

- Burdens (2006)
- The Silhouette (2007)
- Blood of Bacchus (2009)
- Onyx (2011)
