= Dødheimsgard =

Norwegian black metal band

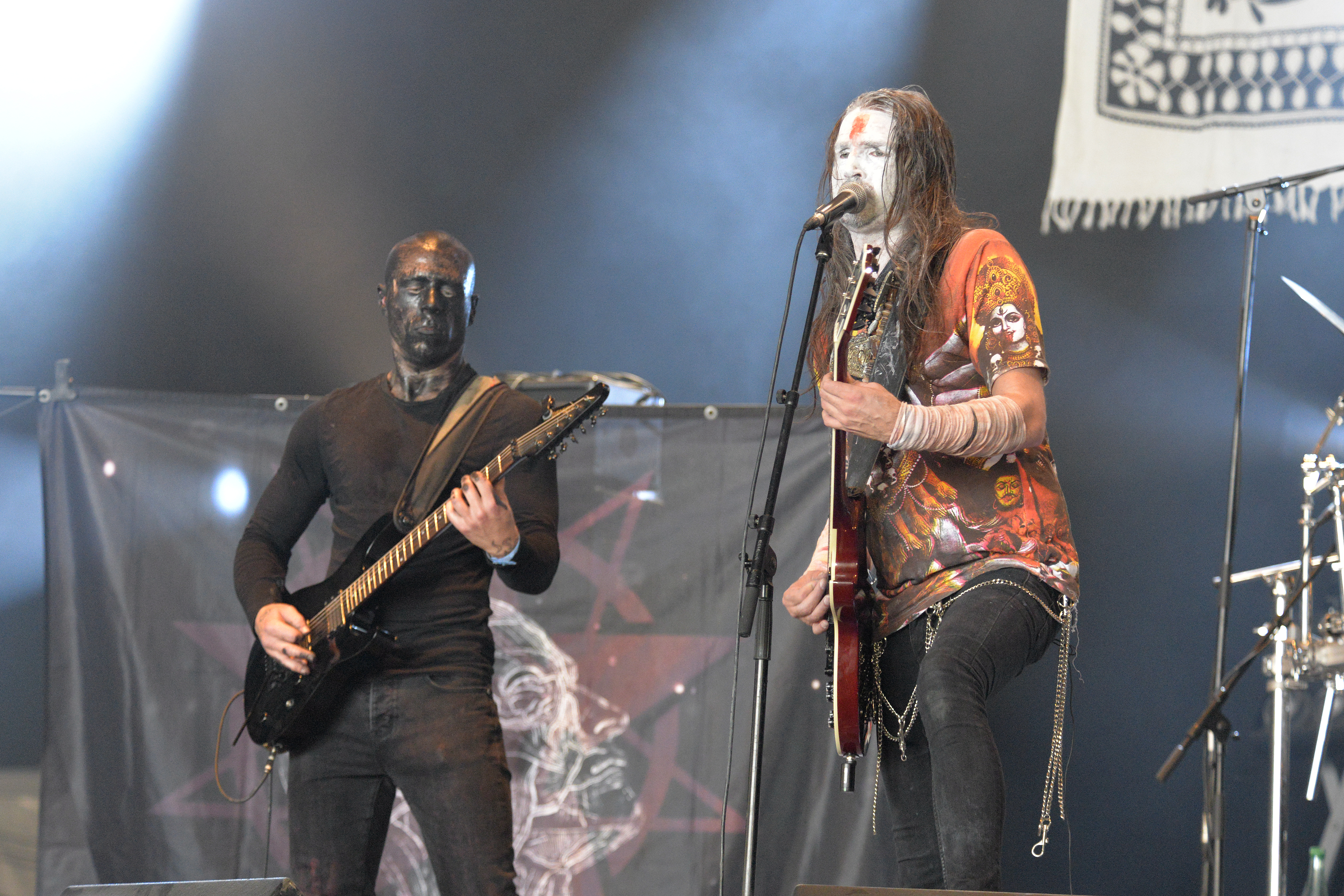
- DHG at Hellfest 2017

Background information
- Also known as: DHG
- Origin: Oslo, Norway
- Genres: Black metal, avant-garde metal, progressive metal, industrial metal
- Years active: 1994–present
- Labels: Peaceville, Moonfog Productions, The End
- Members: Vicotnik; Thunberg; Terghl; L. E. Måløy
- Past members: Alver; Apollyon; Cerberus; Carl-Michael Eide; Fenriz; Kvohst; Galder; Zweizz; Thrawn Hellspawn; Clandestine; Jormundgand; Blargh; Aldrahn

Dødheimsgard (also known as DHG) is a Norwegian extreme metal band formed in 1994. Dødheimsgard played black metal until 1999's 666 International, changing into experimental, avant-garde/industrial metal. In 2000, they shortened their name to DHG.

"Dødheimsgard" is a contraction of Død, which means 'death'; heim, which means 'home'; and gard, which means 'realm'. A natural translation into English would be "Realm of Death".

== History ==
=== Founding of the band and Kronet til Konge (1994–1995) ===
The band was founded in 1994, consisting of Vicotnik (drums, backing vocals), Fenriz (bass, additional vocals) and Aldrahn (lead vocals and guitar). This lineup recorded a promotional demo before releasing their debut album, Kronet til Konge, on Malicious Records in 1995. After the release of the album, they recorded another promotional demo.

=== Monumental Possession, Satanic Art and 666 International; Aldrahn's first departure (1995–1999) ===
Some time after the release of their second promo, Fenriz left the band and was replaced with Alver (bass) and Apollyon (guitar and vocals). This line up recorded Monumental Possession in December 1995, and released it in 1996.

The follow-up EP Satanic Art was released in 1998. The band was joined by Galder (guitars), who at the time was a member of Old Man's Child and would later join Dimmu Borgir, Cerberus (bass), who replaced Alver, and Zweizz (keyboards and effects). On this release, Apollyon switched to drums. Some time after the release of the EP, Galder and Cerberus left the band.

The following year, Dødheimsgard recorded 666 International, released in 1999. For this album, the band had drummer Czral. Apollyon switched back to bass.

Some time after their previous album, Aldrahn, Zweizz and Apollyon left the band.

=== Supervillain Outcast (2004–2011) ===
The band had been working on new material and featured Kvohst (vocals), Thrawn Hellspawn (guitars), and Clandestine (bass). When recording a new album, the band featured Mort (samples), Czral (drums) and Bliss (programming). Aldrahn guest-appeared on the album.

In 2006, they completed Supervillain Outcast, released in April 2007 by Moonfog Productions and The End Records. On 4 January 2008, vocalist Kvohst left the band. In October 2010, he rejoined. Terghl (drums) and Blargh (guitars) joined the band.

Some time during 2011, the band announced that Kvhost had left. Following Kvhost's departure, Blargh, Thrawn Hellspawn and Clandestine also left.

=== Aldrahn's return and A Umbra Omega (2013–2016) ===
In 2013, original vocalist Aldrahn returned to the group, and they were working on a new album. The band released A Umbra Omega on 16 March 2015. After the release, Thunberg (guitar) and L. E. Måløy (bass) joined the group.

=== Aldrahn's second departure and Black Medium Current (2016–present) ===
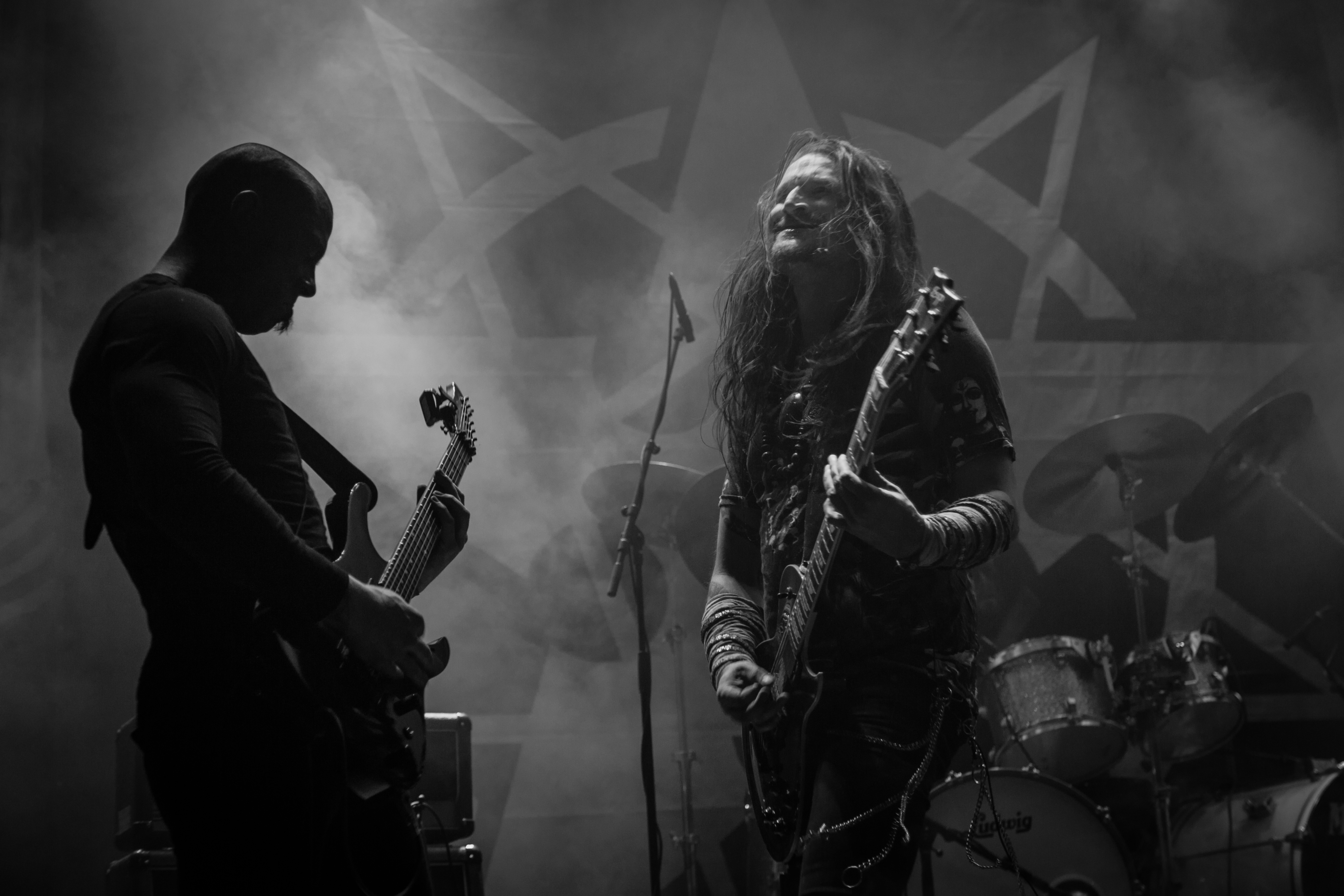
DHG at Complexity Fest, Haarlem 2018

In June 2016, Vicotnik announced that Aldrahn left the band due personal issues. The band continued to tour with Vitcotnik performing lead vocals during their performance dates.

In February 2023, the band announced that Black Medium Current would be released on 14 April 2023.

== Members ==
Current line-up

- Yusaf "Vicotnik" Parvez — guitars (1997–present), vocals (1996–1998, 2011–2013, 2016–present), keyboards (2007–present), drums, backing vocals (1994–1996)
- Tommy "Guns" Thunberg — guitars (2015–present)
- Jonas Ulrik Eide — guitars (2022–present)
- Lars Emil Måløy — bass, piano, cello (2014–present)
- Camille Giraudeau — drums (2025-present)

Former members

- Bjørn "Aldrahn" Gjerde — guitars (1994–2004), vocals (1994–2005, 2013–2016)
- Gylve "Fenriz" Nagell — bass, vocals (1994–1995)
- Jonas Alver – bass (1996)
- Ole "Apollyon" Moe — guitars, vocals (1996), drums (1996–1998), bass (1999)
- Kai "Cerberus" Halvorsen — bass (1996–1998)
- Svein "Zweizz" Hatlevik — keyboards, samples, programming (1997–2003)
- Tom "Galder" Andersen — guitars (1998)
- Carl-Michael "Czral" Eide – drums (1999–2003)
- Mathew "Khvost" McNerney — vocals (2005–2008, 2010–2011)
- Tom "Thrawn Hellspawn" Kvålsvoll — guitars (2005–2011)
- Christian "Clandestine" Eidskrem — bass (2005–2011)
- John "Sekaran" Vooren — drums (2005–2018)
- Ole "Jormundgand" Teigen — keyboards (2006–2011)
- Stian "Blargh" Hammeren — guitars (2010–2015)
- "Void" – bass (2011–2015)
- Øyvind Myrvoll — drums (2019–2024)

Touring members

- Sigmund "Inflabitan" Hansen — guitars, bass (1999)
- Kjetil "Darn" Dahlen — drums (2007–2009)
- Øyvind Myrvoll — drums (2013, 2018–2024)
- Camille Giraudeau — guitars (2019, 2024), drums (2024–2025)
- Matt "OCD" Jarman — guitars (2019)
- Oscar Martín Diez-Canseco — guitars, violin, backing vocals (2024-present)
- Demonia Cristulcia — backing vocals (2025-present)
- Kjersti Marie "Regn" Seiersten — backing vocals (2025-present)

Timeline

== Discography ==
- Kronet Til Konge (1995)
- Monumental Possession (1996)
- Satanic Art (MCD) (1998)
- 666 International (1999)
- Supervillain Outcast (2007)
- A Umbra Omega (2015)
- Black Medium Current (2023)
