= Apoptygma Berzerk discography =

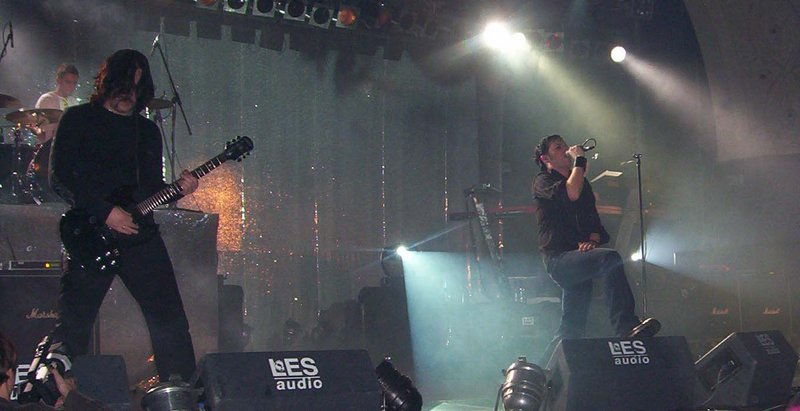
- Apoptygma Berzerk performing in Leipzig in 2004
- Studio albums: 7
- Extended plays: 13
- Live albums: 3
- Compilation albums: 5
- Singles: 21
- Music videos: 11
- DVDs: 3
- Remix albums: 1

Norwegian group Apoptygma Berzerk have released seven studio albums, three live albums, five compilation albums, one remix album, three DVDs, 13 EPs and 21 singles.

== Albums ==
=== Studio albums ===
Year	Album details	Peak chart positions
Year	Album details	GER
1993	Soli Deo Gloria: Released: 11 November 1993; Label: Tatra	—
1996	7: Released: 1 May 1996; Label: Metropolis	—
2000	Welcome to Earth: Released: 22 February 2000; Label: Metropolis	59
2002	Harmonizer: Released: 19 February 2002; Label: Metropolis	21
2005	You and Me Against the World: Released: 12 September 2005; Label: Metropolis	18
2009	Rocket Science: Released: 23 January 2009; Label: GUN	25
2016	Exit Popularity Contest: Released: 7 October 2016; Label: The End	—
"—" denotes a release that did not chart.

=== Live albums ===
Year	Title
1999	APBL98: Label: Metropolis
2001	APBL2000: Label: Metropolis
2010	Imagine There's No Lennon: Label: GUN

=== Compilation albums ===
Year	Title
1998	The Apopcalyptic Manifesto: Label: Metropolis
2003	The Singles Collection: Label: Metropolis
2006	Sonic Diary: Label: GUN
2020	Faceless Fear (B-Sides & Rarities): Label: Pitch Black Drive
2020	Disarm (B-Sides & Rarities)): Label: Pitch Black Drive

=== Remix albums ===
Year	Album details
2019	SDGXXV: Released: 15 March 2019; Label: Tatra

== Extended plays ==
Year	Title
1990	Victims of Mutilation: Label: Metropolis
1992	The 2nd Manifesto: Label: Metropolis
1997	Mourn EP: Label: Metropolis
2004	Unicorn EP: Label: Metropolis
2006	Black EP: Label: GUN
2009	Green Queen: Label: GUN
2011	Black EP Vol. 2: Label: GUN
2013	Major Tom EP: Label: Emmo.biz
2014	Stop Feeding the Beast EP: Label: Emmo.biz
2015	Videodrome: Label: Emmo.biz
2016	Xenogenesis: Label: Emmo.biz
2018	SDGXXV EP: Label: Pitch Black Drive
2020	Nein Danke!: Label: Pitch Black Drive

== DVDs ==
Year	Title
2001	APBL2000: Label: Metropolis
2004	The Harmonizer DVD: Label: Metropolis
2010	Imagine There's No Lennon: Label: GUN

== Singles ==
Year	Song	Peak chart positions	Album
Year	Song	GER	Album
1991	"Ashes to Ashes"	—	Soli Deo Gloria
1993	"Bitch"	—	Soli Deo Gloria
1994	"Deep Red"	—	7
1995	"Non-Stop Violence"	—	7
1997	"Mourn"	—	7
1998	"Paranoia"	—	Welcome to Earth
1999	"Eclipse"	—	Welcome to Earth
2000	"Kathy's Song (Come Lie Next to Me)"	—	Welcome to Earth
2002	"Until the End of the World"	52	Harmonizer
2002	"Suffer in Silence"	90	Harmonizer
2004	"Unicorn"	—	Harmonizer
2005	"In This Together"	24	You and Me Against the World
2006	"Shine On"	13	You and Me Against the World
2006	"Love to Blame"	57	You and Me Against the World
2006	"Cambodia"	67	Sonic Diary
2007	"Nothing Else Matters"	—	Sonic Diary
2009	"Apollo (Live on Your TV)"	94	Rocket Science
2009	"Green Queen"	—	Rocket Science
2013	"Major Tom"	—	—
2019	"Deep Red" (Split 7" with Vile Electrodes)	—	—
2020	"Nein Danke!"	—	—
"—" denotes a release that did not chart.

== Music videos ==
Year	Title
1994	"Deep Red"
1997	"Mourn"
2000	"Kathy's Song (Come Lie Next to Me)"
2002	"Until the End of the World"
2002	"Suffer in Silence"
2003	"Unicorn"
2005	"In This Together"
2006	"Shine On"
2006	"Love to Blame"
2006	"Cambodia"
2009	"Apollo (Live On Your TV)"

== Remixes ==
- Aerodrone – Ready To Love (Apoptygma Berzerk Remix)
- A Split Second – Bury Me In Your Heart (APB Remix)
- a-ha – Lifelines (Apoptygma Berzerk Remix)
- Angst Pop – Ødipus Rex 2012 (Apoptygma Berzerk Dark Club Mix)
- Beborn Beton – Im Innern Einer Frau (Apoptygma Berzerk Mix)
- Cassandra Complex – Twice As Good (Apoptygma Berzerk Rmx)
- Code 64 – Accelerate (Apoptygma Berzerk vs OK Minus remix)
- Dero Goi – Clickbait (Apoptygma Berzerk Remix)
- Echo Image – Endless Day (Club Version - Produced by Apoptygma Berzerk)
- Echo Image – Need To Be Proud (Apoptygma Berzerk Mix)
- Echo Image – Walk My Mind (Apoptygma Berzerk Remix)
- For All The Emptiness – Seduced By A Disease (Apoptygma Berzerk Remix)
- Front 242 – Headhunter 2000 (APB Remix)
- Funker Vogt – Tragic Hero (APB Remix)
- Good Charlotte – The River (Apoptygma Berzerk Remix)
- Good Courage – The World Will Go On (Snowy Norway Mix by APB)
- Goteki – Freebird (Apoptygma Berzerk Remix)
- Hocico – Ruptura (Apoptygma vs. Drugwar Remix)
- Icon of Coil – Repeat It (APB Remix)
- Industrial Heads – Unrated (APB Version)
- JAW – Creature Of Masquerade (APB Remix)
- Kill Instinct - Control (Apoptygma Berzerk Remix)
- kinGeorg - Helter (Apoptygma Berzerk Remix)
- Leæther Strip – How Do I Know (APB Remix)
- Lights Of Euphoria – Show Me Your Tears (APB vs. Industrial Heads Remix)
- Lost In Desire – I Am You (Apoptygma Berzerk Remix)
- Machinista – Dark Heart Of Me (Apoptygma Berzerk Remix)
- Mortiis – Sins Of Mine (Apoptygma Berzerk Remix)
- Nattefrost - Westhofen (Apoptygma Berzerk Remix)
- Nico – "All Tomorrow's Parties" (Nico Vs. Apoptygma Berzerk)
- Nitzer Ebb – Once You Say (Remix By Apoptygma Berzerk)
- Northern Lite – Enemy (Apoptygma Berzerk Remix)
- Page - Krasch (Apoptygma Berzerk Redux)
- Peter Heppner - All Is Shadow (Apoptygma Berzerk Remix)
- Project Pitchfork – Steelrose (APB Remix)
- Remington Super 60 – In Space (Rs60 & Apoptygma Berzerk)
- Sabotage – Who am I (APB Remix)
- Satyricon – The Dawn Of A New Age (APB Remix)
- Scala & Kolacny Brothers – Friday I'm in Love (Remix by Apoptygma Berzerk)
- Sono – Dangerous (Apoptygma Berzerk Mix)
- Switchblade Symphony – Sweet (APB Remix)
- Technomancer – Path of Destruction (Re:Destroyed by Apoptygma Berzerk)
- Tobias Bernstrup – Moments Lost (Apoptygma Berzerk remix)
- The Crüxshadows – Tears (Apoptygma Berzerk Remix)
- The Kovenant – Star by Star (Apoptygma Berzerk Remix)
- Vile Electrodes - Deep Red (Apoptygma Berzerk Remix)
- VNV Nation – Chrome (Apoptygma Berzerk Remix)
- VNV Nation – Genesis (Apoptygma Berzerk Remix)
- Zeromancer – Something For The Pain (Apoptygma Berzerk Mix)

== Side projects ==
- Germ, Ice Eyes on the Stretch (intro) (1992) (One track released on "Sex, Drugs & EBM" compilation. The track was made with Cadaver guitarist Anders Odden.)
- Germ, 3-track Ultra Limited Demo (Cassette only – 10 numbered and signed copies)
- TB-Moonchild, Divine Penetration [CDS] (1994) ("Hard hitting monotony trance")
- H_{2}O, Dre:amseller [CDS] (1994) ("Chilled out trance/ambient" with Geir Bratland)
- H2O, Fahrenheit [CDS] (1995)
- Acid Queen, Bing [EP] (1995)
- Acid Queen, Tranzania (1998) (DJ Applepie (Christian Grimshei), contributions from Jon Erik Martinsen)
- Total Transformation, In Thru Out (1996) ("techno/trance")
- Bruderschaft, Forever [CDS] (2003) (Futurepop dreamteam with DJ Rexx Arkana, Ronan Harris of VNV Nation, Sebastian Komor of Icon of Coil and Joakim Montelius of Covenant)
- Fairlight Children, Before You Came Along [MCD] (2004)
- Fairlight Children, 808 Bit (2004)
- The Kovenant, which Angel joined in 2000, and Geir Bratland in 2003.
- Magenta – Anders Odden's other band.

=== Projects from former members ===
- Angst Pop – Ødipus Rex and Panic At T.C.F. (CD on "Sex, Drugs & EBM Sampler) 1992 (former APB keyboardist Per Aksel Lundgreen)
- Angst Pop – Ødipus Rex (Video Version) CD on "Melt Compilation" 1994 (former APB keyboardist Per Aksel Lundgreen)
- Angst Pop – Viva Ta Vie CD on "Electronic Youth Vol. 3" 1994 (former APB keyboardist Per Aksel Lundgreen)
- Cronos Titan, Brides of Christ CD (1995) (former APB keyboardist Per Aksel Lundgreen)
- Cronos Titan, The Gregoraveian EP [EP] (1996) (former APB keyboardist Per Aksel Lundgreen)
- Chinese Detectives – Situation CD-single 1995 (former APB keyboardist Per Aksel Lundgreen)
- Chinese Detectives – Where Do The Boys Go? CD-single 1995 (former APB keyboardist Per Aksel Lundgreen)
- Chinese Detectives – You Think You're A Man CD-Single 1996 (former APB keyboardist Per Aksel Lundgreen)
- Chinese Detectives – Hit That Perfect Beat CD-Single Promo Only 1999 (former APB keyboardist Per Aksel Lundgreen)
- Chinese Detectives – Are Kisses Out Of fashion? CD 1999 (former APB keyboardist Per Aksel Lundgreen)
- Sweep, Sweepeepee (1997) (Jon Erik Martinsen)
- Sweep, Emptiness, Your Loneliness (2001) (Jon Erik Martinsen)
- Sweep, Miss You (2002) (Jon Erik Martinsen)
- Sweep, Two Players (2003) (Jon Erik Martinsen)

Sources: apoptygmaberzerk.de, eyeliners.org, the berzerk web, and the official German fanpage.
