= Geir Bratland =

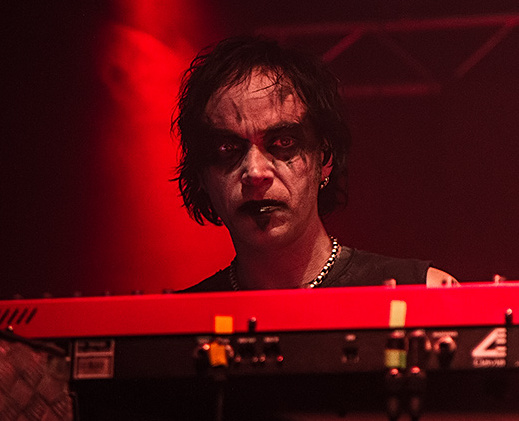
- Geir Bratland live with God Seed in 2012

Background information
- Also known as: Gerlioz, Brat
- Born: 29 July 1970 (age 56); Narvik, Norway
- Genres: Black metal, symphonic black metal, extreme metal, industrial metal
- Occupation: Musician
- Instruments: Keyboards, Synthesizers, Piano, Vocals
- Years active: 1995–present

Geir "Gerlioz" Bratland (born 29 July 1970) is a Norwegian keyboardist for the band Dimmu Borgir and formerly a member of the bands God Seed, Apoptygma Berzerk, The Kovenant, and Satyricon.

== Discography and appearances ==
=== Emperor ===
- Deathfest 2018 (Tilburg, Netherlands)

=== The Kovenant ===
- Live performances (2003-2009)

=== Dimmu Borgir ===
- Abrahadabra (2010)
- Eonian (2018)
- Grand Serpent Rising (2026)

=== God Seed ===
- Live at Wacken (2012)
- I Begin (2012)

=== Apoptygma Berzerk ===
- 7 (Apoptygma Berzerk album) (1996)
- APBL98 (1999)
- Welcome to Earth (2000)
- APBL2000 (2001)
- Harmonizer (2002)
- You and Me Against the World (2006)
- Rocket Science (2009)
- Imagine There's No Lennon (2010)

=== Satyricon ===
- Nemesis Divina (1996)
