= Magenta (Norwegian band) =

Norwegian rock band

Background information
- Origin: Norway
- Genres: Alternative rock, industrial rock
- Years active: 1995–present
- Labels: Cleopatra Records; AT&MT; Tatra Productions; Re:POP
- Members: Anders Odden; Vilde Lockert; Daniel Hill; Erik Engebretsen
- Past members: Ole Bjerkebakke; Endre Tønnensen; Elec This; BatKat
- Website: Magenta on Facebook

Magenta is an industrial rock/alternative rock band from Norway formed by Vilde Lockert and Anders Odden during the summer of 1995. They released their first EP, Magenta in 1997. The song "Secret Sky" entered the charts in Norway and established their career. Co-founder Anders Odden was already known in musical circles. He has been a member of bands like Cadaver and Celtic Frost. He is currently also the bassplayer for Satyricon, and guitarplayer for ORDER.

== History ==
=== Early years: Initial releases and emerging popularity (1995–2003) ===
The album Periode was released in March 1998, and Magenta went on tour in Norway and Germany. An EP prior to this titled Magenta was released in 1997. They signed a new record deal in April 2001 with the German label Re:pop Music. In summer 2001. They recorded the album Little Girl Lost, with the producer Vegard Ibo Blomberg. The album was released in Germany on 24 June 2002, and was very well received in the German alternative press. It reached number 4 in the German Alternative Charts during fall 2002. Magenta made a video for "All Over" featuring the band/musician Mortiis, and were surprised to find that The Coca-Cola Company wanted the song for their worldwide release of Sprite Zero. Magenta's best chart position so far has been for the CD single "All Over", which reached number 2 in the official charts in Greece on 8 July 2002, when the advertising campaign was shown there. Magenta played a number of gigs in 2002 and 2003 and then took some time off after the Arvika Festival in Sweden in 2003.

=== Subsequent activity: Additional studio albums (2003–2009) ===
In 2006, Magenta was reinforced with the bassplayer Daniel Hill. This was very inspiring for the band and led to one of the most creative periods in the band's history. Magenta released a track with Apoptygma Berzerk called "Friendly fire" in the beginning of 2006, and this led Magenta into a serious writing process for a new album. The first new song of the new direction was "Darkest Dream".

Magenta was also strengthened by Jonas Groth who contributed to the production of the rest of the new album. Art and Accidents was released digitally in November 2008 and officially on 9 February 2009. This album was followed with a full European tour with Gothminister and Trail of Tears. Magenta was joined by the drummer, Erik Engebretsen, for this tour. With Hill now permanently on bass guitar, Magenta had for the first time in their history a stable live line up.

Odden decided to explore new grounds for Magenta and decided to write lyrics in Norwegian: the idea came to him as an epiphany on stage in London on his birthday, 20 December 2009, when he performed with Satyricon watching 1000 Englishmen sing along to "Den Siste" in Norwegian. Magenta Aus Norwegen was recorded between September and December 2011 and was first be released as a series of digital EPs. The first single, "To Var Ett"/"Tvillingsjäl" featured guest musicians Niklas Kvarforth and Peter Huss from the Swedish black metal band, Shining

=== Later years: Songs for the Dead and signing to Cleopatra Records (2009–present) ===
In the beginning of 2013, Magenta began recording their comeback album, Songs for the Dead, for which they have returned to their roots of dismal dark and misty music with enchanting vocals, in English. "Songs for the Dead" was born out of a deep tragedy. The Magenta family had been invited to stay at Ministry leader, Al Jourgensen's 13th Planet Studios compound during the Xmas of 2012. They arrived the same day that Ministry guitarist Mike Scaccia left after finishing some recording. Shortly after, on 22 December, news reached them that Mike had died. Everyone at Al's compound was overwhelmed with grief. To try to get somewhat back to normal in the midst of this, they all decided to record something. Vilde and Anders' daughter, Regine, had written a song called "Ghost" in the castle of Duke Hank Von Hell (ex-Turbonegro) the Xmas before. They recorded this track with Al's magic touch and the idea for the album dedicated to those who have past on, was born.

The album is like a requiem and is a new birth for Magenta. It is the first album Magenta have done that they feel represent them fully as the kind of musical entity they want to be. In March 2015 Magenta signed to well known industrial rock label, Cleopatra Records

== Members ==
- Vilde Lockert – vocals
- Anders Odden – instruments & production

=== Live members ===
- Daniel Hill – bass guitar
- Erik Engebretsen – drums

=== Guests on Magenta records and concerts in the past ===
- Pee Jay – programming and turntables
- Elec This – programming, keyboards
- Geir Bratland – programming, keyboards
- Vegard Blomberg – programming, vocals, guitar
- Ole Bjerkebakke – drums
- Michel Langevin – drums (sampled)
- John Macaluso – drums
- Ted Skogman – drums
- Tore Ylwizaker – drums
- Håvard Bævre – drums
- Endre Tønnesen – bass guitar
- Mark Francombe – bass guitar
- Jonny Sjo – bass guitar
- Heine Aardalen – bass guitar
- Stu Manx – bass guitar
- BatKat – bass guitar
- Jonas Groth – vocals and piano
- Gothminister – vocals
- Jean-Luc De Meyer – vocals
- Computorgirl – backing vocals
- Kristoffer Rygg – vocals
- Niklas Kvarforth – vocals
- Agnete Kirkvaag – backing vocals
- Stephan Groth – backing vocals
- Lene Magica – backing vocals
- Audun Stengel (Angel) – lead guitar
- Peter Huss – lead guitar
- Andreas Bjorck – organ
- Kenneth Kannutt – turntables
- Sven Erik Kristiansen – mouth harp

== Style ==
Magenta is a band that likes to work without conventional genre understanding. They have used elements from various genres, including rock, pop, metal, trip hop, electro, techno, industrial, new wave, gothic, acoustic, psychedelic, trance and film music and refuse to be labeled. "Magenta is my playground where I can be as diverse and melodic as I want to," says Odden in an attempt to describe Magenta.

== Discography ==
=== Full-length studio albums and EPs ===
- Magenta (The Secret Sky) EP 1997 AT&MT
- Periode 1998 Tatra
- Little Girl Lost 2003 Re:pop
- Art and Accidents 2009 AT&MT
- Magenta Aus Norwegen 2012 AT&MT
- Songs For The Dead 2015 Cleopatra Records.

=== Singles ===
- "One Mind" SGL 1998 Tatra
- "All Over" SGL 2002 Re:pop
- "Shine On" (2006)^{†} Gun Records
- "Darkest Dream" 2008 AT&MT
- "To Var Ett"/"Tvillingsjäl" 2012 AT&MT

^{†}Magenta made a collaboration song with Apoptygma Berzerk on their "Shine On" single named "Friendly Fire", which was also included on their 2006 Black EP.
