= Rocket Science (Apoptygma Berzerk album) =

Studio album by Apoptygma Berzerk
- Released: January 23, 2009
- Genre: Alternative rock, synthpop, post-punk, industrial rock
- Length: 56:26
- Label: GUN
- Producer: Stephan Groth

Apoptygma Berzerk chronology
Sonic Diary (2006)	Rocket Science (2009)	Imagine There's No Lennon (2010)

Singles from Rocket Science
- 1. "Apollo (Live on Your TV)" Released: 16 January 2009; 2. "Green Queen" Released: 13 November 2009

Rocket Science is a studio album from Apoptygma Berzerk. It follows the same path of synth-rock trends as the band's previous album You and Me Against the World. The first single was "Apollo (Live On Your TV)" followed by "Green Queen". It was also their final album on Gun Records, released one week before the label ceased operating.

The album also features guest vocals on multiple tracks from Benji Madden from Good Charlotte, and Amanda Palmer from The Dresden Dolls. The final track Trash is a cover of a 1996 single by Britpop band Suede.

== Track listing ==
All tracks are written by Apoptygma Berzerk, except "Trash", written by Brett Anderson and Richard Oakes.

No.	Title	Length
1.	"Weight of the World"	6:11
2.	"Apollo (Live on Your TV)" (feat. Benji Madden)	4:27
3.	"Asleep Or Awake?"	3:39
4.	"Incompatible"	6:33
5.	"United States of Credit"	1:33
6.	"Shadow"	4:58
7.	"Green Queen"	4:52
8.	"Butterfly Defect"	3:57
9.	"The State of Your Heart (Shit End of the Deal)"	4:13
10.	"Rocket Calculator"	1:50
11.	"→"	2:13
12.	"Pitchblack/Heat Death"	4:16
13.	"Black Versus White" (feat. Amanda Palmer)	5:17
14.	"Trash" (Suede cover)	2:27

== Personnel ==
=== Apoptygma Berzerk ===
- Stephan Groth – vocals, programming, synth
- Geir Bratland – synth, vocoders, backing vocals
- Angel – guitar
- Fredrik Brarud – drums, backing vocals

=== Other musicians ===
- Benji Madden – vocals
- Amanda Palmer – vocals
- Jonas Groth – vocals
- Ida Helen Fjeld – vocals
- Solveig Petersen – vocals
- Chris White – spoken words
- Emil Nikolaisen – guitars
- Mikael Jensen – bass
- Dag Anders Sandell – bass
- Jon Erik Martinsen – MS-20
- Alexander Odden – synth

=== Production ===
- Stephan Groth – producer
- Bob Kraushaar – audio mixer
- Willi Dammeier – audio mixer
- Marcus Forsgren – audio mixer
- Bjarne Stensli: – audio mixer
- Emil Nikolaisen – audio mixer
- Maor Appelbaum – sound designer
- Howie Weinberg – mastering

=== Design ===
- Alaric Hammond – cover art design
- Sven Sindt – photos
- Tarjei Ekenes Krogh – photos

== Charts ==
Chart performance for Rocket Science
Chart (2009)	Peak position
German Albums (Offizielle Top 100)	25
