= Tristraum =

American futurepop band

- Origin: United States
- Genres: Synthpop, electropop
- Years active: 2004–present
- Label: Section 44 Records
- Members: Krystyna Eller, Randall Erkelens, Pierre Norman
- Website: http://www.tristraum.com

Tristraum is a futurepop band from Denver, Colorado. The band consists of Krystyna Eller (lead vocals and lyrics), Randall Erkelens (synthesizers & programming), and Pierre Norman (programming).

== Career ==
Their first single 'Shiver' charted on the German DAC charts with remixes from Assemblage 23 and Echo Image. Released on the German label Intrapop and distributed by A Different Drum, 'Shiver' earned positive music reviews. Gray, their debut album on Section 44 Records, was released in 2005 followed by a second single "First Embrace" in 2006. Tristraum has appeared on dozens of various artists compilations and remixed over 25 other artists in their first two years together.

Norman and Erkelens launched Section 44 in 2005 to release Tristraum's debut album along with synthpop/electronic tributes to '80s synthpop pioneers Dead or Alive and Pop/Alt Rock band The Fixx. Section 44 Records has signed over a dozen artists from around the globe. From the United Kingdom: The Alphabet Girls and Eight to Infinity. From Costa Rica: Sybel. From Australia: Tycho Brahe. From Denmark: Fake the Envy. From USA: Eloquent, Provision, Rhythmic Symphony. From Sweden: Royal Visionaries. The label acquired World Synthpop Records in 2005 and Kiss My Asterix Records in 2006.

== Discography ==
Gray - CD (Section 44, USA)
Shiver - MCD (Intrapop, Germany)
Shiver - German Promo (Intrapop, Germany)
Shiver - 12" (Mile High House, USA)
First Embrace - MCD (Section 44, USA)
First Embrace - 4x4 Volume 1 (Section 44, USA)
Spanky - Dominatricks, 12" (Twitch Recordings, USA)

=== Compilation appearances ===
First Embrace - Silver Echo Records
Eyes Wide Open - A Different Drum / Section 44
Eyes Wide Open (Foretaste Remix) - Section 44
Eyes Wide Open - Colorado Dark Arts Festival
Eyes Wide Open - Dark Horizons Radio
I'm Under No One (God Project Remix) - The Flesh Harvest
First Embrace (Amurai Remix) - Amalgam Records
Shiver (Lime n Dale Remix) - A Different Drum
First Embrace (Amurai Remix) - Advanced Synergy
First Embrace (Trotskis Block Remix) - Yet Another Electro Label
I'm Under No One (Hajas Remix) - Synthphony Records
Gray - A Different Drum
Chase the Fire - Section 44
First Embrace - Colorado Dark Arts Festival
Shiver (Empire State Human Remix) - 9th Wave Records
Baby Don't Say Goodbye - Section 44
Shiver (The Missing Link Remix) - 4 mg Records
Shiver - Dark Horizons Radio
Shiver (Empire State Human Records) - Electro Culture Magazine
Brilliant - Intrapop

=== Remix releases ===
Provision - Ideal (Section 44)
Capsize - Problem (A Different Drum)
Stratos - Sonic Disturbances (Baily Records)
The Dignity of Labour (A Different Drum)
Leiahdorus - Kiss on the Telephone (A Different Drum)
James D Stark - Dying Beauty (A Different Drum)
Somegirl - Feel Free (A Different Drum)
The Echoing Green - Stand or Fall (Section 44)
Color Theory - But Not Tonight (11th Records)
Brand New Day - Thinking of You (Leg End Productions)
T.O.Y. - Another Lovesong (A Different Drum)
Equatronic - Time (Intrapop)
Fiction 8 - Let Go (Cryonica)
