= Science Fiction (Blackmail album) =

Studio album by blackmail
- Released: January 29, 1999
- Recorded: 1998–1999
- Genre: Indie rock, progressive rock
- Length: 49:34
- Label: bluNoise Records
- Producer: Kurt Ebelhäuser, Guido Lucas

Blackmail chronology
blackmail (1997)	Science Fiction (1999)	Do Robots Dream of Electric Sheep? (2000)

Science Fiction is the second album by the German indie rock quartet Blackmail. Following up their debut release in 1997, Science Fiction was more openly accepted and liked. It also accumulated quite a large number of fans, which was a beginning of a more solid career for Blackmail.

== Track listing ==
1. "Londerla" – 3:07
2. "Dull" – 2:33
3. "Feeble Bee" – 4:52
4. "Gone Too Soon Too Far" – 2:49
5. "The Fjords of Zimbabwe" – 4:59
6. "Mu" – 5:28
7. "Dental Research '72" – 7:53
8. "Nostra" – 2:50
9. "Smoke Gutter" – 4:49
10. "Iodine" – 2:34
11. "3, 000, 000 Years From Here" – 3:18
12. "Soon Too Far Gone Far" – 4:22

== Personnel ==
- Aydo Abay – vocals
- Kurt Ebelhäuser – guitars, backing vocals, keyboards
- Carlos Ebelhäuser – bass
- Mario Matthias – drums

== Do Robots Dream of Electric Sheep? ==
Do Robots Dream of Electric Sheep?

Remix album by blackmail
- Released: February 4, 2000
- Recorded: 1999
- Genre: Electronica, drum and bass
- Length: 73:28
- Label: Nois-O-Lution/EFA
- Producer: blackmail

Blackmail chronology
Science Fiction (1999)	Do Robots Dream of Electric Sheep? (2000)	Bliss, Please (2001)

Do Robots Dream of Electric Sheep? is a remixed version of Science Fiction, similar to Linkin Park's Reanimation. It was released on February 4, 2000. The name of the album is a play on the title of Philip K. Dick's science fiction novel Do Androids Dream of Electric Sheep?

=== Track listing ===
1. "Londerla" (Killer Loop remix) – 5:06
2. "Dull" (Darkipher remix) – 4:17
3. "Feeble Bee" (Peppermint remix) – 3:55
4. "Gone Too Soon Too Far" (Soon Too Double Far Gone remix) – 4:59
5. "The Fjords of Zimbabwe" (Evil Fishing remix) – 4:06
6. "Mu" (Flutes Are No Instruments-version) – 5:04
7. "Dental Research '72" (The Song Formerly Known as Nostra-mix) – 3:59
8. "Nostra" (Zipped Close remix) – 5:22
9. "Smoke Gutter" (G.I.D. is a DJ remix) – 4:35
10. "Iodine" (Reperformed by Scumbucket) – 5:12
11. "3, 000, 000 Years From Here" (If Goth Is Around the Corner remix) – 6:15
12. "When I Met Bon I Changed the Tempi" – 2:11
13. "Soon Too Far Gone Far" (Slowfuck-version) – 5:08
14. "3, 000, 000 Years From Here" (Space Madison remix) – 9:59
15. "Stabilo Pink" (Performed by Der Weltraumbruder) – 3:20
