= Harmonizer (Apoptygma Berzerk album) =

Studio album by Apoptygma Berzerk
- Released: 25 February 2002
- Length: 69:37
- Label: Metropolis

Apoptygma Berzerk chronology
| APBL2000 (2001) | Harmonizer (2002) | The Singles Collection (2003) |

Singles from Harmonizer
- 1. "Until the End of the World" Released: 11 February 2002; 2. "Suffer in Silence" Released: 25 August 2002; 3. "Unicorn" Released: 1 June 2004

Professional ratings
Review scores
| Source | Rating |
|---|---|
| AllMusic | 4/5 stars |

Harmonizer is the fourth studio album by Norwegian futurepop band Apoptygma Berzerk. It was released on 25 February 2002 on Metropolis Records and WEA International.

== Concept ==
Harmonizer has been described by fellow bandmember Geir Bratland as Stephan's "most personal album". Many of the lyrics were heavily influenced by Stephan's divorce with his ex-wife Cathrine and the relationship with their daughter Iben. It was heavily criticized upon its release as Apoptygma Berzerk's "sellout" album, a title later given to Stephan's follow-up album, You and Me Against the World, which saw an even more radical change in style, heading towards a 1980s rock influence.

Harmonizer did well on the German albums chart, reaching number 21; the album's singles "Suffer in Silence" and "Until the End of the World" also charted in Germany. The band managed to obtain a contract deal with Warner, a major label which previously formed a contract with Stephan's then-newly established label "Hard:Drive" after his departure from the band Tatra, which went bankrupt in 2005. Stephan even appeared on a mainstream Norwegian music show due to the popularity of the "Suffer in Silence" single.

The album was produced by Stephan Groth and his old friend Alon Cohen. Though Cohen has recently worked with mainstream rock and hip-hop artists and bands, he had done work in the EBM genre in the early 1990s under the moniker Defcon 4 and had lived in Norway for a brief amount of time. Alon was also thought to have been responsible for much of the album's distinctive sound, though Stephan still retained a high degree of artistic control.

== The Harmonizer Tour ==
Ted Skogmann decided to leave the band shortly after the album's release and though he appears on the album, playing guitar on the "Until the End of the World" track and on the "Suffer In Silence" single edit, he has not returned to the band since. For the tour and for Apop's third single "Unicorn", he was replaced by Angel, a former Kovenant guitarist who helped give the same aggressive attitude on stage.

Fredrik Brarud was also included into the band to play live drums which added another dimension to the music. He has stuck with the band since, along with Angel.

The Harmonizer tour took Apop all over the world, even into more dangerous zones such as Israel where they performed "Non-Stop Violence" to an ecstatic crowd of fans. A concert at The Grosse Freiheit in Hamburg, Germany was filmed and released on a DVD along with a documentary and all the videos from the album called The Harmonizer DVD which also included the Unicorn EP, which included a new video version of the track which was a stylistic change as it added drums and guitar on top of the original track. It also included a lot of remixes and two B-sides.

== Track listing ==
All tracks are written by Stephan Groth.

Original pressing
| No. | Title | Length |
|---|---|---|
| 1. | "More Serotonin... Please" | 1:29 |
| 2. | "Suffer in Silence" | 5:52 |
| 3. | "Unicorn" (Duet Version) | 4:11 |
| 4. | "Until the End of the World" | 5:52 |
| 5. | "Rollergirl" | 4:42 |
| 6. | "O.K. Amp – Let Me Out" | 9:50 |
| 7. | "Pikachu™" | 3:45 |
| 8. | "Spindizzy" | 5:09 |
| 9. | "Detroit Tickets" | 7:19 |
| 10. | "Photoshop® Sucks" | 1:58 |
| 11. | "Something I Should Know" (ends at 5:47; hidden tracks "Unicorn (reprise)", "Untitled 6" and "Spindizzy (reprise)" begin at 10:22) | 19:30 |

Limited edition pressing
| No. | Title | Length |
|---|---|---|
| 11. | "Something I Should Know" | 5:47 |
| 12. | "Unicorn (original version)" (ends at 4:12; hidden tracks "Unicorn (reprise)", "Untitled 6" and "Spindizzy (reprise)" begin at 9:10) | 18:24 |

2007 pressing bonus tracks
| No. | Title | Length |
|---|---|---|
| 12. | "Pikachu™" (Daydream Mix by Sonic Code) | 4:04 |
| 13. | "Until the End of the World" (Martin Eyerer Remix) | 6:12 |
| 14. | "Until the End of the World" (Schiller Remix) | 5:38 |
| 15. | "Untitled 5" | 7:13 |

== Charts ==
Chart performance for Harmonizer
| Chart (2002) | Peak position |
|---|---|
| German Albums (Offizielle Top 100) | 21 |
