= Section 44 Records =

American independent record label

- Founded: 2004
- Founder: Randall Erkelens, Pierre Norman
- Distributor(s): A Different Drum
- Genre: Synthpop, electronic, darkwave, EBM, futurepop
- Country of origin: U.S.
- Location: Denver, Colorado

Section 44 Records is an independent record label and online store based in Colorado and specializing in electronic music and related genres. In 2004, Section 44 Records was formed by Pierre Norman and Randall Erkelens from the band Tristraum. Section 44 acquired the synthpop forum Sloth Radio and defunct label Kiss My Asterix Records. The label has released albums, singles, and compilations by The Alphabet Girls, Leiahdorus, Eight to Infinity, Eloquent, Empire State Human, Tristraum, and Tycho Brahe. Although based in the U.S., the roster includes international bands. Section 44 Records added Breye Kiser of Provision and Steven Cochran of Eloquent, and Royal Visionaries to its management and A&R in 2005.

== Discography ==
- Eloquent: Carousel of Life – Catalog # SEC-019
- Royal Visionaries: Analogue Fairytale – Catalog # SEC-018
- Sector One: Vol 2 – Various Artist Compilation – Catalog # SEC-017
- Storybox: No Dancing Allowed – Catalog # SEC-016
- Tycho Brahe: Transatlantic – The Atlantic Remixes – Catalog # SEC-015
- Chinese Theatre: Voices & Machines – Catalog # SEC-014
- Fake the Envy: Blind – Catalog # SEC-013
- Eloquent: Carousel of Life (Limited Edition E.P.) – Catalog # SEC-012
- New Music Sampler: Various Artist Compilation – Catalog # SEC-011
- Rhythmic Symphony: The Mechanism Fulfilled – Catalog # SEC-010
- Sector One: Various Artist Compilation – Catalog # SEC-009
- Eight to Infinity: Aether – Catalog # SEC-008
- Tristraum: Gray – Catalog # SEC-007
- Tristraum: First Embrace MCD – Catalog # SEC-006
- Provision: The Consequence – Catalog # SEC-005
- Provision: Ideal Warfare MCD – Catalog # SEC-004
- 4x4: Volume Two – Catalog # SEC-003
- The Fixx: An Electronic Tribute – Catalog # SEC-002
- Rocket: A Tribute to Dead or Alive – Catalog # SEC-001
- Eloquent: Future pop – Catalog # WSR01
- Royal Visionaries: Back to Yazoo – The Remix E.P. – Catalog # WSR02
- Spanky: Dominatricks 12" Vinyl – Catalog # TW-EP–08
- Empire State Human: Cycles – Catalog # KMA
- Jaded: Various Artist Compilation – Catalog # KMA
- Cosmicity: Definitive CD/DVD KMA
- The Alphabet Girls: Beatnik Europa KMA
- Electrokuted!: An electronic tribute to the Gods of Metal and Rock. KMA
- Tristraum: Shiver 12" Vinyl MHHP-EP–03
- Tristraum: Shiver MCD INT–0130
- 4x4: Volume One KMA-SOO4

== See also ==
- List of electronic music record labels
