= One Day Silver, One Day Gold =

Studio album by Blue October
- Released: July 2005
- Genre: Synth-pop
- Label: A Different Drum
- Producer: Reza Udhin and Blue October

Blue October chronology
Preaching Lies to the Righteous (2001)	One Day Silver, One Day Gold (2005)	Walk Amongst the Living (2008)

One Day Silver, One Day Gold is the third album by the British synthpop band Blue October.

The band hosted a release party for the album at The Giltz/Madame Jojo's in London on 21 July 2005.

== Track listing ==
1. "It's Not Enough"
2. "I Never Thought I'd See You Cry"
3. "Un-done"
4. "Free"
5. "Nervous Energy"
6. "Pushing"
7. "Somewhere"
8. "Are We The Reason?"
9. "Nowhere"
10. "The Soul Within
11. "Supanova"
12. "Light Over Dark"
13. "The Soul Within" (Polarised Sustain Mix) ^{1}
14. "It's No Enough" (Modular Music Mix) ^{1}
15. "I Never Thought I'd See You Cry" (Nano Thought Control Mix) ^{1}
- ^{1} Bonus tracks

== Personnel ==
- Ross Carter: Vocals
- Glen Wisbey: Keyboards & Programming
- Chris Taubert: Keyboards & Sampling
- Nic Johnston: Guitars

== Details ==
1, 2, 3, 4, 5, 7, 8, 10, 11, 12 written by Glen Wisbey and Ross Carter
6 written by Glen Wisbey
9 written by Glen Wisbey / Chris Taubert

Guitars by Nic Johnston
Backing vocals on tracks 1, 7, 8 by Alexys B

Bonus tracks remixed by Glen Wisbey
Bonus tracks additional production Reza Udhin

All songs were written and recorded between October 2002 and October 2004

== Singles ==
One single was released from the album.

1. "Free" (2004)

== Credits ==
Produced by Reza Udhin and Blue October UK

Recorded at The Safe, Essex
Mixed at Cryonica Studios, London

== Review ==
The strong acoustic elements of this album are reminiscent of indie bands such as The Lightning Seeds or James and while this incorporating of a wider range of styles aids the music in standing out from the synthpop hordes it is then given more guts by a very modern rhythmic approach with Ross Carter's melodic vocal style providing the perfect accompaniment throughout, from the easy-going opener "It's Not Enough" (which, along with "Are We The Reason?" features backing vocals from Alexys B), the bustling "The Soul Within" or the infectious "I Never Thought I'd See You Cry".

For me, the highlights come in the shape of the harder-edged instrumentals "Pushing" & "Nowhere", both of which benefit from some fine musicianship, while the powerfully majestic chorus that graces "Somewhere" provides another memorable moment. And just to make sure the album doesn't miss out on that all-important club action are the three 'club mixes' at the end, all of which (by the band's own Glen Wisbey with help from Reza Udhin) make the most of the band's catchy style & benefit from the extra dynamic boost.
