= Walk Amongst the Living =

Studio album by Blue October
- Released: 11 November 2008
- Recorded: Between October 2006 and June 2008
- Genre: Alternative rock
- Label: A Different Drum
- Producer: Steve Travell

Blue October chronology
| One Day Silver, One Day Gold (2005) | Walk Amongst the Living (2008) |

Walk Amongst the Living is the fourth album by British synthpop band Blue October.

A review from Metal.de stated that "while the [album] is not particularly bad, it is also not a milestone in the history of electropop".

== Track listing ==
1. The Miracle's Gone
2. City Lights
3. Let Me See
4. All is Said and Done
5. Tears of Silvery Rain
6. Taking on this Love
7. Ascension
8. The Girl from Ohio
9. What's on Your Mind?
10. Spinning on the Fullstop
11. Non Compos Mentis
12. People are Strange
13. Beautiful Skin

== Personnel ==
- Ross Carter: Vocals
- Glen Wisbey: Keyboards, programming
- Chris Taubert: Keyboards, sampling
- Nic Johnston: Guitars
- Bob Malkowski : Additional drums and percussion
- Millie Blue: Backing vocals on "Spinning on the Fullstop"
