= The Apopcalyptic Manifesto =

Studio album by Apoptygma Berzerk
- Released: April 21, 1998
- Genre: Futurepop
- Label: Metropolis Records

Apoptygma Berzerk chronology
7 (1996)	The Apopcalyptic Manifesto (1998)	APBL98 (1998)

Professional ratings
Review scores
Source	Rating
Allmusic	3/5 stars

The Apopcalyptic Manifesto is a compilation album by Norwegian futurepop group Apoptygma Berzerk. The album is mostly a compilation of tracks from Soli Deo Gloria and with other early single tracks added. A lot of tracks are exclusive to this release, such as the original version of "Arp", "APB Goes C-64" and "Lidelsens Mening". Also, the "Crisp version" of "Burnin' Heretic" included on the limited edition of this release hadn't been released since it appeared on the "Sex, Drugs & EBM" sampler in 1992. This was also the first time the original vinyl version of "Ashes to Ashes" was released on a CD along with its b-side "Wrack 'Em to Pieces". The album reached #18 on the CMJ RPM charts in the U.S.

== Track listing ==
No.	Title	Length
1.	"APB Goes C64" (Intro)	1:44
2.	"Deep Red"	3:58
3.	"Bitch"	4:24
4.	"Stitch"	3:05
5.	"Spiritual Reality"	4:38
6.	"Electronic Warfare"	5:23
7.	"All Tomorrows Parties" (The Velvet Underground cover)	5:04
8.	"Arp"	2:16
9.	"Burnin' Heretic" (Album Version)	5:32
10.	"Lidelsens Mening"	4:41
11.	"Backdraft"	4:18
12.	"Ashes to Ashes" (German Slam Version)	3:51
13.	"The Approach of Death"	1:32

Limited Edition Bonus Tracks
No.	Title	Length
14.	"Ashes to Ashes" (12" Version)	4:08
15.	"Wrack 'em to Pieces"	5:16
16.	"Burnin' Heretic" (Crisp Version)	6:11
