= Sonic Diary =

Compilation album by Apoptygma Berzerk
- Released: December 1, 2006
- Genre: EBM, alternative rock
- Label: GUN; Sony
- Producer: Apoptygma Berzerk

Apoptygma Berzerk chronology
You and Me Against the World (2006)	Sonic Diary (2006)	Rocket Science (2009)

Singles from Sonic Diary
- 1. "Cambodia" Released: 1 December 2006; 2. "Nothing Else Matters" Released: 1 January 2007

Sonic Diary is a two-disc compilation release from Apoptygma Berzerk. The first disc contains a collection of covers the band has recorded over the course of their career while the second disc is a collection of remixes, some of which were previously released and others which were new.

Apoptygma Berzerk also released their Black EP in 2006; the ten-song Black EP contains several remixes of songs from You and Me Against the World.

== Track listing ==
Disc one
No.	Title	Writer(s)	Original artist	Length
1.	"Cambodia"	Marty Wilde, Ricky Wilde	Kim Wilde	4:22
2.	"Bend and Break"	Tim Rice-Oxley, Tom Chaplin, Richard Hughes	Keane	4:37
3.	"Who's Gonna Ride Your Wild Horses"	U2	U2	5:23
4.	"A Strange Day"	Robert Smith, Simon Gallup, Lol Tolhurst	The Cure	4:28
5.	"Coma White"	Marilyn Manson, Twiggy Ramirez, Madonna Wayne Gacy, Zim Zum	Marilyn Manson	3:54
6.	"Fade to Black"	James Hetfield, Lars Ulrich, Cliff Burton, Kirk Hammett	Metallica	5:23
7.	"Shine On"	Guy Chadwick	The House of Love	3:16
8.	"The Damned Don't Cry"	Steve Strange, Midge Ure, Billy Currie, Rusty Egan, Dave Formula	Visage	4:03
9.	"All Tomorrow's Parties" (Version '93)	Lou Reed	The Velvet Underground	5:05
10.	"Electricity"	Paul Humphreys, Andy McCluskey	OMD	5:06
11.	"Ohm Sweet Ohm"	Ralf Hütter, Florian Schneider	Kraftwerk	6:03
12.	"Bizarre Love Triangle"	Bernard Sumner, Peter Hook, Stephen Morris, Gillian Gilbert	New Order	3:43
13.	"All Tomorrow's Parties" (Nico Vs. APB Remix)	Reed	The Velvet Underground	4:14
14.	"Nothing Else Matters" (hidden track)	Hetfield, Ulrich	Metallica	5:22

All tracks are written by Apoptygma Berzerk.

Disc two
No.	Title	Length
1.	"Mourn" (Mesh Remix)	4:11
2.	"Back On Track" (Northern Lite Remix)	3:41
3.	"Until the End of the World" (Ladytron De-Shape Remix)	4:39
4.	"Deep Red" (Blackmail Version)	3:24
5.	"Maze" (Zombie Girl Remix)	7:04
6.	"Love to Blame" (Sono Remix)	3:50
7.	"Pikachu" (Darkdream Mix by Soni Code)	6:58
8.	"Love to Blame" (Pelton Trashy Remix)	3:28
9.	"Tuning in to the Frequency of Your Soul" (Cyberpunk Remix)	3:56

== Charts ==
Chart performance for Sonic Diary
Chart (2006)	Peak position
German Albums (Offizielle Top 100)	92
