= Preaching Lies to the Righteous =

Studio album by Blue October
- Released: April 2001
- Recorded: March 1999 to February 2001
- Genre: Alternative
- Label: A Different Drum
- Producer: Glen Wisbey / Ross Carter

Blue October chronology
Incoming (1998)	Preaching Lies to the Righteous (2001)	One Day Silver, One Day Gold (2005)

Preaching Lies to the Righteous is the second album by British synthpop band Blue October.

== Track listing ==
1. Mistakes
2. All I Need Is Now
3. Stranded
4. Closer to the Sky, than the Sea
5. I Remember It Too
6. While Easy Slips Away
7. Casino
8. Silent Partner
9. Venice Is Crumbling
10. Lust Is a very Dangerous Thing
11. Leaving This Place
12. Let the Sandman Descend

== Personnel ==
- Ross Carter: Vocals
- Glen Wisbey: Keyboards, programming
- Nic Johnston: Guitars
- Giles Pitcher: Guitars
- Backing vocals on "Stranded" by Zena James

== Details ==
All songs written by Glen Wisbey and Ross Carter
