= Apop =

Apop may refer to:

- APOP (Email Protocol)
- APOP Kinyras Peyias FC, a Cypriot football club
- Apoptygma Berzerk, a Norwegian electronica band
