= Blackmail (album) =

Studio album by Blackmail
- Released: October 10, 1997
- Recorded: 1994–1997
- Genre: Alternative rock, alternative metal, grunge, progressive rock
- Length: 56:30
- Label: bluNoise Records
- Producer: Kurt Ebelhäuser

Blackmail chronology
Blackmail (1997)	Science Fiction (1998)

Blackmail (stylised as blackmail) is the debut album by the artist of the same name, released through BluNoise Records. The album consisted of tracks that the band was able to record in a high-tech recording studio that was readily lent to them by a German producer legend named Stuart Bruce who was impressed with their demo-recordings. Bruce, as well as Guido Lucas, produced the album. Guido Lucas started his own record label in Koblenz known as bluNoise Records. Blackmail was able to secure his support, after many other record labels turned down their request to be taken in. The album, however, still did not get a very positive consumer response.

== Track listing ==
No.	Title	Length
1.	"Blink/I Get Numb"	6:12
2.	"When I Start Today"	2:22
3.	"Bare Me"	3:15
4.	"Tomorrow Never Knows" (The Beatles cover)	5:51
5.	"Red Rum"	8:45
6.	"Some Daze"	3:32
7.	"Salt Cellar"	3:02
8.	"Extravaganza"	4:22
9.	"Z"	5:32
10.	"Radiant Carrot"	7:02
11.	"Designed by the Moon"	6:35
Total length:		56:30

== Personnel ==
- Aydo Abay – vocals
- Kurt Ebelhäuser – guitars, backing vocals, keyboards
- Carlos Ebelhäuser – bass
- Mario Matthias – drums
