= Soli Deo gloria (disambiguation) =

Soli Deo gloria is a Latin term for Glory to God alone, used in a Christian context.

Soli Deo gloria may also refer to:

- Soli Deo Gloria (record label), John Eliot Gardiner's record label
- Soli Deo Gloria (album), album by Apoptygma Berzerk
- Soli Deo Gloria Publications, imprint of Reformation Heritage Books
