= Daybehavior =

Swedish indie-pop band

- Origin: Stockholm, Sweden
- Genres: Indie pop, downtempo
- Years active: Since 1993; 32 years ago
- Labels: North of No South Records; JimmyFun Music; A Different Drum
- Members: Tommy Arell; Paulinda Crescentini; Carl Hammar
- Past members: Tommy Arell (break)

Daybehavior is a Swedish indie-pop trio, founded in Stockholm, in 1993 by Tommy Arell, Paulinda Crescentini and Carl Hammar. The trio's music is heavy influenced by movies, electronics and beats.

== History ==
Their debut album Adored was released in 1996 by Swedish indie label North of No South Records (NONS). Per Gessle's company JimmyFun Music, released the album in 15 countries worldwide. The album received positive reviews in publications including New Musical Express, Select, The Times and Melody Maker.

During 1998 and 1999 they, recorded their follow-up album with Kevin Petri, engineer on Massive Attack's debut album Blue Lines (1991). NONS, dealing with financial problems, went into bankruptcy 99 and the album was locked from being released. The band in despair decided to take a break and Arell moved to Thailand.

By 2003, Crescentini and Hammar decided to finish the album, now updated with some new material. Their second album, Have You Ever Touched a Dream? was released in 2004 by American indie label A Different Drum.

Crescentini and Hammar, not feeling comfortable with the missing part of the trio as well as having musical differences, decided to put the band on hold.

In 2009, Arell thought it was time to rejoin the band and started to work on new material.

During summer and fall 2010, the band recorded their new album, FOLLOW THAT CAR!, which was released September 2012.

The band also made original music for a film, Ellinor's Wedding (Ellinors bröllop; 1996) and have had several songs in the Dance Dance Revolution music video game.

== See also ==
- Culture in Stockholm
- List of indie pop artists
- Music of Sweden
