= Droom =

Canadian Electronic Music Duo

- Origin: Vancouver, British Columbia, Canada
- Genres: Futurepop; Synthpop; Gothic rock
- Years active: 2002–2007
- Label: A Different Drum
- Members: Graham Jackson; William Winslow-Hansen

Droom were a Canadian electronic music duo formed in 2002 in Vancouver that combined elements of futurepop, synthpop, post punk and gothic rock. The band had two club hit singles and enjoyed success on college radio charts. The musical style has been likened to that of The Cure, OMD, New Order, Images in Vogue, and Depeche Mode; The Province compared the duo's style on 128 ½ Days to "the darker side of Depeche Mode."

== Biography ==
Droom was formed in the summer of 2002 by Graham Jackson and William Winslow-Hansen from the many discussions during Jacksons and Winslow-Hansens tenure in aLUnARED. They immediately began working on tracks for their debut album, 128 ½ days. They enjoyed the success of two club hit singles, "While We Can" and "Stay!", and they quickly gained a growing fan base in the underground music scene.

The band played a show in San Antonio, Texas as part of a synthpop festival in 2003. The band members continued to spend the majority of their time on writing and recording new material. When 128 ½ days was released, it charted on many online and college radio charts in North America and around the globe. Droom decided to pave its own way in order to bring their music to their fans. When they felt that they had recorded enough material to comprise a 2nd full-length album, Droom formed their own record label to release their subsequent Ten Songs and The Voice of Ghosts albums.

== Discography ==
- While We Can EP (2003)
- Stay! EP (2003)
- 128 ½ Days (2003)
- Blood Culture EP (2004)
- Ten Songs (2004)
- The Voice of Ghosts (2006)
