= B! Machine =

Musical group

- Origin: United States
- Genres: Synthpop, new wave
- Years active: 1996–present
- Labels: Wishduck, A Different Drum
- Members: Nathaniel Nicoll

B! Machine is a synthpop band from San Francisco, California.

The band was formed in 1996, consisting of the sole founding member, writer and musician, Nathaniel Leigh Nicoll. The current line-up of the band varies, but typically consists of Nathaniel Nicoll, Mike Hayden, and James Wong. The meaning behind the name B! Machine has been veiled behind cryptic remarks since its inception.

== History ==
Nicoll formed Doctors With Knives with Mike Hayden after the singer for a prior band "left unexpectedly." After a number of limited releases, Nicoll released Dorlotez-vous on cassette tape under the name Halflife before forming B! Machine.

== 1996–2000 ==
B! Machine's first project, Must Kill, was recorded in 1996–97. This debut, however, was shelved and left uncirculated until after the release of B! Machine's second full-length project Aftermath, which was distributed by A Different Drum in 1998. Following on the heels of Aftermath, B! Machine signed with A Different Drum. In 1999, they released the full-length CD Infinity Plus which featured production by Jarkko Touhimaa of Neuroactive. Infinity Plus, which spawned the singles "Temple" and "Opal", was well received, with the album peaking at #25 and the "Opal" CD5 peaking at #26 on the CMJ RPM Charts in the U.S.

== 2001–2009 ==
In the 2000s, B! Machine released three full studio albums: Hybrid, The Evening Bell, and Falling Star. A special 4-disc box set of Falling Star was also released. A collection of alternate versions of previous songs was released as Alternates and Remixes. In addition, a 6-disc anthology of B! Machine songs was released as The Machine Box.

== 2021–2022 ==
In March 2021, the B! Machine website came back online at a new domain name, announcing a forthcoming full-length album entitled Snake Charm Girl would drop in the spring of 2022. "Half The Time", the first digital-only single celebrating the album, was released March 22, 2022 on Bandcamp. Snake Charm Girl was released digitally on August 5, 2022, through Bandcamp with a limited edition double CD available from Poponaut.

== Discography ==
=== Albums ===
- Aftermath (1998)
- Infinity Plus (1999)
- Hybrid (2001)
- Alternates And Remixes (2002)
- Machine Box (2002)
- Machine Box (Disc Six - Bonus Disc) (2004)
- The Evening Bell (2004)
- The Evening Bell (Limited Edition 4-Disc Set) (2005)
- The Falling Star (2007)
- Snake Charm Girl (2022)

=== Singles ===
- Temple (1999)
- Opal (2000)
- Opal (Limited 2 CD Edition) (2000)
- Umbrella (2001)
- Angels (2004)
- Forget (2005)
- The Other Girl (2009)
- A Certain Sadness (February, 2010)
- Half The Time (2022)
