= 7 (Apoptygma Berzerk album) =

- Cover to the original edition of the album

Studio album by Apoptygma Berzerk
- Released: 1 May 1996
- Genre: Futurepop; Experimental; Electro
- Length: 57:27
- Label: Tatra; Metropolis

Apoptygma Berzerk chronology
Soli Deo Gloria (1993)	7 (1996)	The Apopcalyptic Manifesto (1998)

Singles from 7
- 1. "Deep Red" Released: 1 Apr 1994; 2. "Non-Stop Violence" Released: 1 Apr 1995; 3. "Mourn" Released: 1 Oct 1997

Re-issue cover

Professional ratings
Review scores
Source	Rating
Allmusic	3/5 stars

7 is the second studio album from Norwegian futurepop group Apoptygma Berzerk. The album was released in 1996 following frontman Stephan Groth's work on several side projects. It has been remastered and re-released in 2003, 2008 and 2014 (on cassette) respectively. While each remaster included bonus songs, the samples of Carl Orff's "O Fortuna" present on "Love Never Dies – Part 1" were replaced with a choir keyboard patch playing an entirely different melody, due to copyright issues over the original pressings by Tatra and Metropolis Records. The album peaked at #18 on the CMJ RPM Charts in the U.S.

== Track listing ==
Original 1996 pressing
No.	Title	Length
1.	"Love Never Dies – Part 1"	5:28
2.	"Mourn"	5:33
3.	"Non-Stop Violence"	6:51
4.	"25 Cromwell St." (Alludes to serial killer Fred West, who killed at least 12 young women in Gloucester, England, and committed suicide in 1995.)	4:24
5.	"Rebel"	5:51
6.	"Deep Red"	4:00
7.	"Nearer"	6:35
8.	"Half Asleep"	4:55
9.	"Love Never Dies – Part 2" (ends at 2:58; hidden tracks "Non-Stop Violence (reprise)", "Untitled One" and "Untitled Too" begin at 9:55)	19:56

1998 Metropolis pressing
No.	Title	Length
9.	"Mourn (Remix)"	7:13
10.	"Electricity" (OMD cover)	5:09
11.	"Love Never Dies – Part 2" (ends at 2:58; hidden tracks "Non-Stop Violence (reprise)" and "Untitled One" begins at 7:55)	14:27
12.	"Untitled Too" (unlisted track)	3:25

2002 remastered pressing
No.	Title	Length
9.	"Love Never Dies – Part 2" (ends at 2:58; hidden tracks "Non-Stop Violence (reprise)" and "Untitled Too" begins at 9:58)	16:05
10.	"Mourn" (APB Guitar Remix)	6:17

2007 remastered pressing
No.	Title	Length
9.	"Love Never Dies – Part 2"	2:58
10.	"Deep Red" (Blackmail Remix)	3:25
11.	"Untitled 2" (includes "Non-Stop Violence (reprise)" as a prologue)	6:07
12.	"Mourn" (APB Guitar Remix)	6:17
13.	"Mourn" (Lo-Fi Version)	6:39
