= Cosmicity =

Project name for the electronic musician Mark Nicholas

Cosmicity (Mark Nicholas)
- Genres: Synthpop; Electronica
- Years active: 1994–present
- Labels: Dirty Electronic, A Different Drum
- Members: Mark Nicholas
- Website: cosmicity.com

Cosmicity is the project name for the American, Detroit-based electronic musician Mark Nicholas. His music combines singer-songwriter melodies with synthesizers, drum machines, and deeply personal lyrics.

In the 1990s, as a student at the University of Michigan School of Music and Technology, Nicholas released his first full-length album The Vision. Since that time, Cosmicity has become one of the best-known artists in the so-called synthpop underground, most notably as a founding artist on the iconic synthpop record label A Different Drum. His accomplishments have included playing large synthpop festivals alongside 1980s acts like Alphaville and Anything Box, winning songwriting contests (such as the John Lennon Songwriting Contest in 2006), and even placing music on a few television shows – such as the Matthew Fox series Haunted.

In addition to original compositions, Cosmicity has released cover songs such as "Bloc Bloc Bloc" by Orchestral Manoeuvres in the Dark, and "Automatic" by The Pointer Sisters. Original holiday-themed songs include "Halloween" and "This is Your Crappy Christmas Present".

Cosmicity has remixed songs for iconic 1980's synthpop bands such as Red Flag, and, Real Life, as well as popular modern acts including The Bird and the Bee in 2012.

Between 1994 and 2005, Cosmicity released seven full-length CDs The Vision (1994), The Moment (1995), Isabella (1997), Renaissance (1998), The Binary Language of Love (1999), Pure (2001), Escape Pod for Two (2003), in addition to two EPs, Syn (1996) and Forgive Me My Syns (1998), a remix album Resynthesized (1999), and two greatest hits compilations, In Perspective (1998) and CD/DVD combo Definitive: 1997 – 2004 (2005).

During the years spanning 2006–2009, Mark Nicholas released two albums (Duchess 33 – 2007, Perversions – 2008) under his given name, dropping the Cosmicity project name so he could concentrate on more industrial sounds – and darker lyrics.

2010 saw the release of the 5-song EP ASCII Cupcake and a return to Mark Nicholas using his Cosmicity project name. 2012 brought the release of the Parlour Sofas EP.

The full-length album, Humans May Safely Graze, was released worldwide in 2014. It was mastered at Abbey Road Studios and was distributed in CD, streaming, and digital download formats, including the iTunes Mastered for iTunes format.
