= Echo Image =

Norwegian synthpop band

- Origin: Fredrikstad, Norway
- Genres: Synth-pop, futurepop
- Years active: 1997–present
- Labels: Bloodline, A Different Drum, Hard:Drive, HolmByKarlsen Rekords, Kvarts Musikk, Pitch Black Drive
- Members: Pål-Magnus Rybom
- Past members: Jon-Ivar Berg, Trine Bilet, Fredrik Hansen, Lars Kristian Holt

Echo Image is a Norwegian synthpop band from Fredrikstad. The band started in the summer of 1997 when Pål Magnus Rybom and Jon-Ivar Berg started experimenting with electronic music. That summer the two of them recorded a demo. Berg left the group after they failed attract the attention of record labels and went to focus on his music project Biozide. Later that year Fredrik Hansen joined and Echo Image was officially formed with Trine Bilet joining towards the end of the year providing backing vocals, keyboards, and synthesizers.

In December 1998, Echo Image recorded the Walkout EP, which was sold locally through a label called Kvarts Musikk. Their musical style didn't really suit Kvarts, whose catalog consisted of punk, prog, and lo-fi music; so in 2000 they signed to US synthpop label A Different Drum with the German label Bloodline releasing their music in Europe. Around this time Lars Kristian Holt joined as live guitarist and became a full-time member in July 2001.

The 2000 single Need to Be Proud was mixed by Apoptygma Berzerk frontman Stephan Groth. Compuphonic was released in 2001 and peaked at #28 on the CMJ RPM Charts in the U.S. After releasing Compuphonic simultaneously on A Different Drum and Bloodline, they signed with Hard:Drive and released the Endless Day single in 2002. Echo Image accompanied Apoptygma Berzerk on the Harmonizer tour in 2002. Hansen left the band in 2004 due to creative differences and to focus on his education. Around the same time, the band announced that they were working on a new album and released a teaser for the song "My Sense of Emptiness".

The 2001 Single Skulk, which included a cover of Limahl's song "The NeverEnding Story", was also featured in the dancing games Dance Dance Revolution ULTRAMIX 2 and the Konami remix in Dance Dance Revolution ULTRAMIX 4, both for the Xbox video-game system.

In July 2010, a new demo song, "Things I Know" was released to YouTube, along with a new interview of Pål Magnus Rybom who mentioned that he is working on a new Echo Image album.

On 1 October 2010, Echo Image played a live concert at ElektroStat.

In April 2016, vinyl-only compilation, Compulation, was released on the label HolmByKarlsen Rekords. It features the previously unreleased track, "Frame of Mind".

In January 2020, the band signed to Apoptygma Berzerk's label Pitch Black Drive and re-released all of their old material digitally. They also announced that they were working on a new single.

In March 2021, a new single, Walk My Mind, was released, five and a half years after a short clip of the song was featured on Echo Image's Facebook page.

== Discography ==
=== Albums ===
==== Studio albums ====
1. Compuphonic (2001)

==== Compilation albums ====
1. Compulation (2016)

=== EPs ===
1. Walkout (1998)
2. III EP (1999)
3. Skulk (2001)
4. Standing Alone (2001)

=== Singles ===
1. Need to Be Proud (2000)
2. Endless Day (2002)
3. Walk My Mind (2021)
4. Mono No Aware (2022)
5. Madsong (2024)

== Remix Work ==
Echo Image has done remixes for a number of other bands. The mixes to date are :

1. Assemblage 23 - Document
2. Count to Infinity - Popism
3. The Echoing Green - Heart with a View
4. The Echoing Green - The Story of Our Lives
5. Fairlight Children - Before You Came Along
6. Goteki - Phuturist
7. Sweep - Emptiness, Your Loneliness
8. Tristraum - Shiver

== Members ==
- Pål-Magnus Rybom - production, vocals (1997–present)
- Jon-Ivar Berg – (1997)
- Fredrik Hansen - synthesizers (1997–2004)
- Trine Bilet - backing vocals, keyboards, synthesizers (1997–?)
- Lars Kristian Holt – guitar (2001–?)
