= Bliss, Please =

Studio album by blackmail
- Released: (Germany) 25 May 2001 (Japan) 25 May 2005
- Recorded: 2000–2001 at Blubox Studio in Troisdorf, Germany
- Genre: Alternative rock
- Length: 56:08
- Label: Imperial Records
- Producer: Carsten Stricker

Blackmail chronology
Do Robots Dream of Electric Sheep? (2000)	Bliss, Please (2001)	Friend or Foe? (2003)

Alternative cover
- Export release cover

Bliss, Please is the third studio album by the German alternative rock band Blackmail, released in 2001. The album is known for popular singles such as "Same Sane", "Ken I Die" and "A Reptile for the Saint". It also features Blackmail adopting the independent music genre through experimentation in their songs.

== Track listing ==
1. "Data Buzz" – 2:44
2. "Same Sane" (Album Version) – 3:45
3. "Amelia" – 5:14
4. "A Reptile for the Saint" – 5:03
5. "For Shure" – 3:08
6. "Emetic" – 2:54
7. "By Any Method" – 4:38
8. "Dee" – 0:47
9. "The Small Saving Tar Pit" – 3:19
10. "Frop" – 3:20
11. "Ken I Die" – 4:10
12. "Club 45" – 2:44
13. "Sad Sauce" – 4:10
14. "Permanently Temporary" – 6:22
15. "Leave On" – 2:21
16. "The Day The Earth Stood Still" – 6:43

== Personnel ==
- Aydo Abay – vocals
- Kurt Ebelhäuser – guitars, backing vocals, keyboards
- Carlos Ebelhäuser – bass
- Mario Matthias – drums

== Charts ==
Chart (2001)	Peak position
German Albums (Offizielle Top 100)	72

Chart (2020)	Peak position
German Albums (Offizielle Top 100)	46
