= APBL2000 =

Live album by Apoptygma Berzerk
- Released: June 5, 2001
- Genre: Futurepop
- Labels: Metropolis; Warner Music Group

Apoptygma Berzerk chronology
Welcome to Earth (2000)	APBL2000 (2001)	Harmonizer (2002)

Singles from APBL2000
- 1. "Starsign"

APBL2000 is the second live concert album by Apoptygma Berzerk containing live recordings from their "Welcome To Earth Tour". It was released on July 31, 2001 through Metropolis Records in the US, and Warner Music Group in Europe. Live footage of the tour is available on DVD and VHS.

== Track listing ==
No.	Title	Length
1.	"Intro"	0:58
2.	"Starsign"	5:31
3.	"Stitch"	2:57
4.	"Paranoia"	7:01
5.	"Eclipse"	6:44
6.	"Deep Red"	3:59
7.	"Soultaker"	6:01
8.	"Kathy's Song (Come Lie Next to Me)"	6:57
9.	"Non Stop Violence"	6:01
10.	"Fade to Black" (Metallica cover)	5:16
11.	"Mourn"	6:34
12.	"Beatbox"	5:48
13.	"Bitch"	4:23
14.	"Multimedia" ("Starsign", "Eclipse" videos and backstage footage.)

== Personnel ==
- Stephan Groth (STP) (Grothesk) – vocals, programming, guitars and everything
- Fredrik Darum – producer, live guitarist
- Ted Skogmann – drums and guitar
- Geir Bratland – keyboard, backing vocals
