= Vilde Lockert =

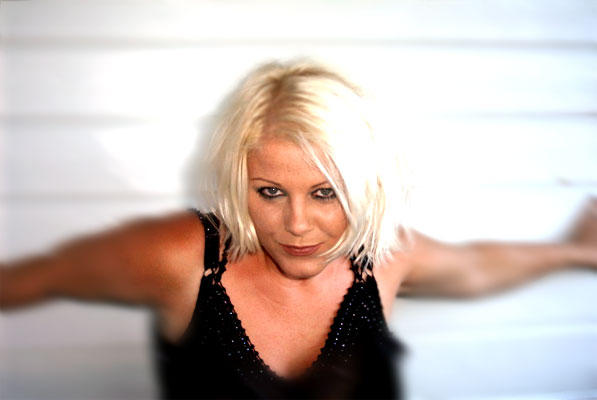

Background information
- Also known as: Vilde
- Born: Vilde Lockert Aas; April 28, 1970 (age 55)
- Origin: Tromsø, Norway
- Genres: Industrial rock Alternative rock
- Occupations: Musician; Vocalist; Songwriter
- Instrument: Vocals
- Years active: 1989 – Present
- Labels: Tatra Productions; AT&MT; Gun Records/SonyBMG; Re:POP
- Website: http://www.myspace.com/vildemagenta

Vilde Lockert (née Lockert Aas) (born April 28, 1970), is a Norwegian musician, singer, lyricist, and writer.

Since 1995, she's the vocalist and lyricist for the industrial rock-duo Magenta.

She has also done vocals and lyrics for Apoptygma Berzerk, Vandalist Virgin, and Femme Brutale, and guest vocals for Arcturus and Fleurety.

Since 2020, she's the editor for the travel magazine "Tid For Tur" (Time For A Trip). For nearly twenty years, 1999–2018, she was a book reviewer for the online magazine "Kulturspeilet".

== Personal life ==
Vilde Lockert was born in Tromsø, but moved all over Norway due to her father's military career. She had a modeling career in the UK and Spain in the early 90s until she moved to Oslo in 1995 and joined Magenta.

She's married to musician Anders Odden, and the couple share a daughter.

== Discography ==
=== Magenta ===
==== Albums ====
- 1998: Periode (Tatra)
- 2002: Little Girl Lost (Re:pop)
- 2009: Art and Accidents (AT&MT)

==== Singles/EPs ====
- 1997: Magenta EP (AT&MT)
- 1998: "One Mind" SGL (Tatra)
- 2002: "All Over" SGL (Re:pop)

=== Apotygma Berzerk ===
- 2006: Shine on EP (GUN/SonyBMG)
- 2006: Black EP (Metropolis)

== Bandography ==
- Varig Visjon: vocals, 1989–1990
- Magenta: vocals, 1995–present
- Vandalist Virgin: 2003–2005
- Femme Brutale: 2005–2006
- Apoptygma Berzerk: vocals, 2006
