= Neuroactive =

Finnish electronic music band

- Origin: Finland
- Genres: Synthpop, futurepop, EBM
- Years active: 1991–present
- Labels: Cyberware Productions; A Different Drum; Alfa Matrix
- Spinoff of: Advanced Art
- Members: Jarkko Tuohimma; Kimmo Karjalainen; Vesa Rainne
- Past members: Sonja Myers; Ville Brusi

Neuroactive is a Synthpop, Futurepop, EBM music group from Finland founded by Jarkko Tuohimaa, Ville Brusi, and Vesa Rainne.

== History ==
Neuroactive was formed in 1991 by Jarkko Tuohimaa (after he left the band Advanced Art), Ville Brusi, and Vesa Rainne. After signing with Cyberware Productions, their first album, Morphology, was released in 1994 and followed by Phonic Trace in 1997. Shortly thereafter, Brusi and Rainne left the group, and Kimmo Karjalainen came on board to sing for the next two albums, Fiber Optic Rhythm and Transients. Fiber Optic Rhythm also featured Geoff Pickney of The Nine on guest vocals.

Fiber Optic Rhythm was a huge breakthrough for Neuroactive, and they gained new fans worldwide. The album's popularity also attracted the attention of U.S. Synthpop record label A Different Drum who signed them in 1998. Neuroactive continued to release material under that label until its closing in 2014, including Transients in 2001, N-Gin in 2005, Antidote in 2009, and Electra in 2014.

After Transients, life and family obligations took energy away from the band leading vocalist Kimmo Karjalainen to depart and eventually begin his own project, Huminoida. The albums N-Gin and Antidote both included several guest singers, including Christopher Anton (Information Society), Kirk Taylor (The Dignity of Labour), Marcus Fellechner (Rename), and Albert Martinez (Neuropa) among others. Electra features all female vocals by Sonja Myers.

After a six year hiatus, Neuroactive returned with a new single, "Night Flights", on the Belgian label Alfa Matrix. Tuohimaa then brought back former members Karjalainen and Rainne to release a full-length album Minor Side-Effects and subsequent singles for "Dances" and "In Rust We Trust". Minor Side Effects also features two songs with guest vocals by John Peverieri of Halo Effect.

Neuroactive has remixed numerous bands over their career including: Aïboforcen, Aghast View, Iris, B! Machine, Neuropa, The Nine, T.O.Y., and Assemblage 23.

== Discography ==
=== Albums ===
- Morphology (1994)
- Phonic Trace (1997)
- Fiber-Optic Rhythm (1999) – #16 CMJ RPM Charts U.S.
- Neurology 1994-2000 (2000)
- Transients (2001)
- N-gin (2005)
- Antidote (2009)
- Electra (2014)
- Minor Side-Effects (2020)

=== Singles ===
- "Neuron" (1995)
- "Parallel Lifeforms" (1998) – #9 CMJ RPM Charts U.S.
- "Put Your Trust In Me" (1999)
- Visualise Mixes (1999)
- "Play" (2002)
- "Wonders of the World" (2002)
- "Space Divider" (2004)
- "Night Flights" (2020)
- Dances Remixes (2020)
- "In Rust We Trust" (2021)
