= Blue October (British band) =

English pop group

- Origin: Dagenham, England
- Genres: Alternative; synthpop; pop; dance
- Years active: 1995–present
- Label: A Different Drum
- Members: Glen Wisbey; Chris Taubert; Nic Johnston; Chris Beecham
- Past members: Barney Miller (deceased) 1996–1998; Ross Carter 1999–2010

Blue October is an English synth-pop/dance band based in Essex, formed in 1996 by Glen Wisbey and Barney Miller.

Their first album, Incoming, was released in 1998, on the US record label A Different Drum. Tragedy struck as Miller unexpectedly died soon afterwards. In 2001 a second album, Preaching Lies to the Righteous, was released with Ross Carter replacing Miller as vocalist. A third album, One Day Silver, One Day Gold, was released in 2005 as a third member, Chris Taubert, joined the band.

The band released their fourth album, Walk Amongst the Living, in 2008. Produced by Steve Travell.

In 2010, Carter left the band, who have since recruited Chris Beecham as replacement. June 2010 saw the band start work on their, as yet, untitled fifth studio album.

In addition to the album releases, Blue October have appeared on a number of compilation albums, and the Microsoft Xbox game Dance Dance Revolution Ultra Mix 4.

== Band members ==
- Chris Beecham – vocals
- Glen Wisbey – keyboards
- Chris Taubert – keyboards
- Nic Johnston – guitars

Touring member

- Bob Malkowski – drums

== Discography ==
=== Albums ===
Year	Title
1998	Incoming
2001	Preaching Lies to the Righteous
2005	One Day Silver, One Day Gold
2008	Walk Amongst the Living

=== Singles ===
Year	Title	Album
1997	"Incoming"	Incoming
1999	"Believe"	Incoming
2000	"Stranded"	Preaching Lies to the Righteous
2002	"Mistakes"	Preaching Lies to the Righteous
2004	"Free"	One Day Silver, One Day Gold
2007	"Let Me See" ^{1}	Walk Amongst the Living

- ^{1} Digital single
