= Midnight Resistance (band) =

- Genres: Synthpop
- Years active: 2007–present
- Labels: A Different Drum; Remote-Music / Sony-Music
- Members: Nico; Gorden; Gregsen

Midnight Resistance is a German synthpop musical group. The band started as a solo project of Nico, since the end of 2007 Gorden and Gregsen completed the current band line-up. Midnight Resistance released their debut album "Remote" on the label A Different Drum in August 2008. In the second half of 2009 the band signed to the German label "Remote-Music / Sony-Music", where they will release their forthcoming album in 2010.

== Members ==
- Nico – Synthesizer, Guitar, Songwriting, Vocals
- Gorden – Guitar
- Gregsen – Synthesizer

== Discography ==
- Full-length albums
  - Remote (2008, A Different Drum)
  - The Mirror Cage (2012, Farscape-Records / Alive)
- Compilation & Remixed
  - Dopamin 3 (2007, Codeline Records)
  - Synthpop Club Anthems 5 (2008, A Different Drum)
  - A Different Mix 6 (2009, A Different Drum)

Source: Band Website
