= APBL98 =

Live album by Apoptygma Berzerk
- Released: May 15, 1999
- Genre: Futurepop
- Label: Metropolis Records

Apoptygma Berzerk chronology
The Apopcalyptic Manifesto (1998)	APBL98 (1999)	Welcome to Earth (2000)

APBL98 (short for Apoptygma Berzerk Live 1998) is Apoptygma Berzerk's first live album containing live recordings from concerts all across Europe. It was mainly recorded with DAT-tape recorders borrowed from Stephan's father, Jan Groth and has been described by Stephan as a "commercial bootleg album" due to its quality.

== Track listing ==
All tracks by Stephan Groth. Except track 18.

No.	Title	Length
1.	"Roll the Tape"	0:56
2.	"Deep Red" (Location: Cactus Club / Bruges)	4:01
3.	"We're Going On Now!"	0:09
4.	"Bitch" (Location: LaLocomotive / Paris)	4:09
5.	"Love Never Dies" (Location: Kick / Herford)	5:20
6.	"I Smashed the Monitors Today"	0:19
7.	"Mourn" (Location: Dynamo / Zürich)	7:41
8.	"Nightliner Interview"	1:51
9.	"Stitch" (Location: Linentreu / Berlin)	4:15
10.	"Paranoia" (Location: Zeche Carl / Essen)	8:28
11.	"The Greatest German Joke Ever"	0:21
12.	"Backdraft" (Location: Shelter / Vienna)	4:07
13.	"Cooler Than Ringo"	1:48
14.	"Burning Heretic" (Location: Baroeg / Rotterdam)	5:37
15.	"Welcome to Rotterdam"	0:44
16.	"Non-Stop Violence"	6:37
17.	"Belgium is That Way"	0:32
18.	"Enjoy the Silence / Excerpts From Leipzig" (Location: ArvikaFestivalen)	10:07

== Media disc ==
The album also contained an interactive CD-ROM disc that could be played on either a PC or a Macintosh, that contained an extensive documentary of the tour filmed with a handheld camera, an interview about the Mourn track, a music video for Deep Red, a sort of "live" music video for Enjoy the Silence and an interactive menu.

== Personnel ==
- Stephan Groth (Grothesk) – vocals, programming, guitars and everything
- Geir Bratland – keyboard, backing vocals
- Anders Odden – guitar
