= Endless Shame =

Swedish band

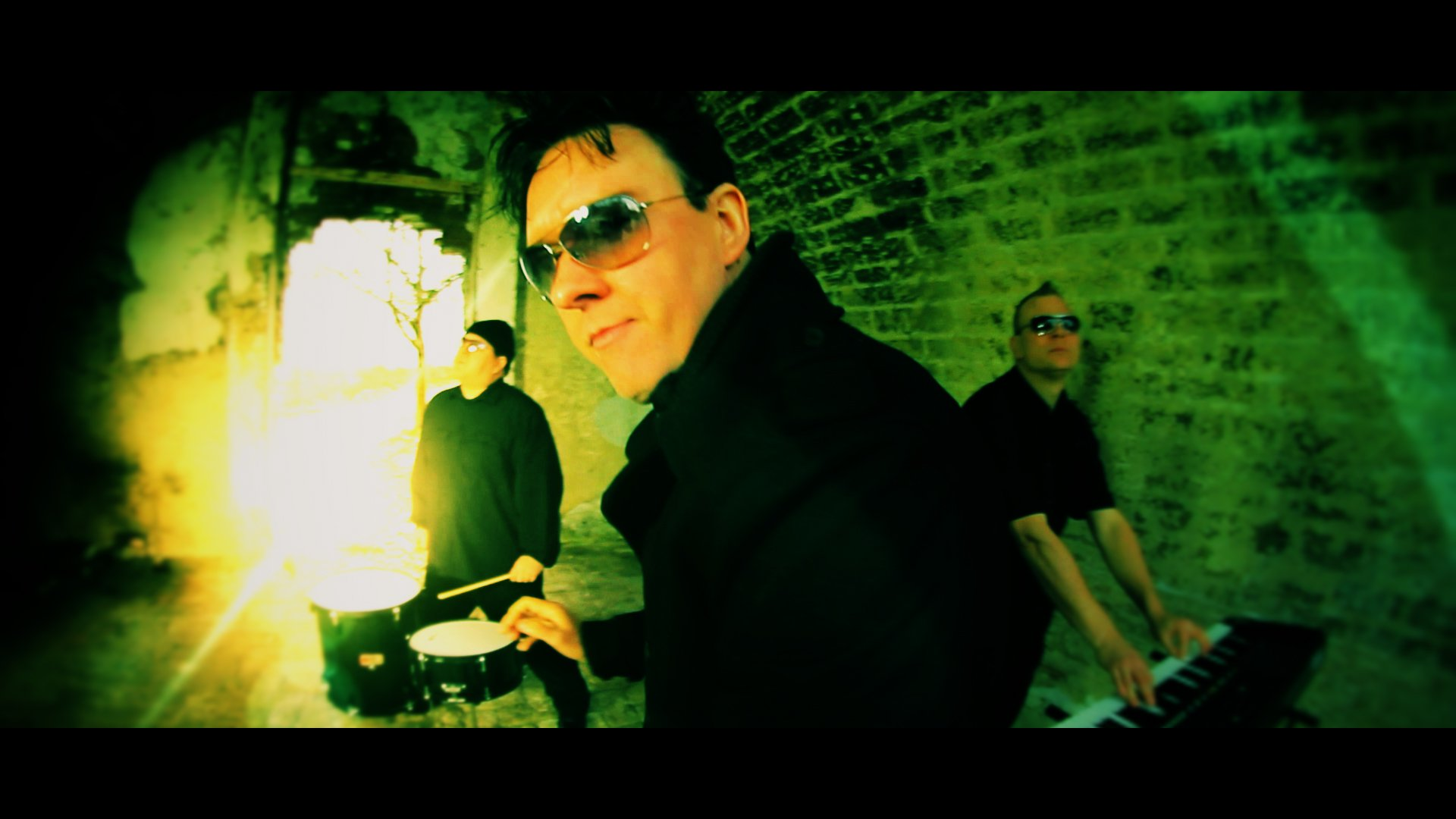
- Endless Shame 2011

Background information
- Origin: Kristianstad, Sweden
- Genres: New wave, synthpop
- Years active: 1993–present
- Labels: A Different Drum, EK-Product, K-Town Records
- Members: Mattias Nybble; Mika Rossi; Anders Olsson
- Website: www.endlessshame.com

Endless Shame is an electronic band from the South of Sweden. The music is inspired by various types of electronic music and alternative rock and pop.

Endless Shame started in the 90s but it wasn't until 2007 that they released their debut album Price of Devotion on the Swedish record label ”K-Town Records”. The album got positive reviews and was nominated for ”best album of the year” in the category ”Synth” at ”Manifestgalan” in Sweden. In November 2009 the band released their second album Unspoken Words on the American record label A Different Drum. The album got a great deal of attention amongst fans of synth pop, EBM and electro. The single ”Pure” went on to become a dance hit at clubs playing electronic music. In 2010, Endless Shame decided to work together with EK Product in Italy for the release of their third album Generation Blind. Along with the album a single "Halo" was released and the band recorded a music video for the song "The Reaper" in Naples, Italy in October 2010.

== Discography ==
- Price Of Devotion CD (2007)
- Rebel Girl CDM (2008)
- Pure CDM (2009)
- Unspoken Words CD (2009)
- Halo CDM (2009)
- Generation Blind CD (2011)
- Elevator CD (2012)
