= Welcome to Earth (album) =

Studio album by Apoptygma Berzerk
- Released: February 22, 2000
- Genre: Futurepop
- Length: 74:00
- Label: Metropolis
- Producer: Fredrik Darum

Apoptygma Berzerk chronology
APBL98 (1999)	Welcome to Earth (2000)	APBL2000 (2001)

Singles from Welcome to Earth
- 1. "Paranoia" Released: 5 May 1998; 2. "Eclipse" Released: 11 Aug 1999; 3. "Kathy's Song (Come Lie Next to Me)" Released: 11 Dec 2000

Professional ratings
Review scores
Source	Rating
AllMusic	4/5 stars

Welcome to Earth is the third studio album by Norwegian futurepop band Apoptygma Berzerk. It was released on February 22, 2000, on Metropolis Records but was earlier released on Tatra Records.

The general themes of the album are those of extraterrestrials contacting Earth and of moving on. The songs themselves contain samples of reports of alien sightings, and crop circle designs feature prominently in the cover and liner notes. Several tracks have been staples in live concerts ever since, especially the single "Kathy's Song", which became one of the band's biggest hits, being remixed by high-profile artists such as VNV Nation and Ferry Corsten.

== Themes ==
The album deals mainly with the modern mythology of extraterrestrial aliens and a hope that one day the truth will be revealed to us. Generally the tracks convey a feeling of alienation as well.

Stylistically, the album drew criticism upon its release for incorporating elements of vocal trance music on tracks such as "Eclipse" and "Kathy's Song", and overall being geared towards being a pop album. There are some tributes to the Commodore 64 home computer as well, hidden in the "64k" track which is based heavily on a sample of Chris Hülsbeck's Commodore 64 version of "Axel F", and the track Untitled 4 is essentially a Commodore 64 chiptune.

The track "Moment of Tranquility" is a reimagined version of "Falling", the theme song to the television series Twin Peaks, with new lyrics. The beginning of the song contains a sample of dialogue from a Season 2 episode.

== Track listing ==
No.	Title	Writer(s)	Length
1.	"Everything We Know Is Wrong"	Stephan Groth	1:28
2.	"Starsign"	S. Groth	5:35
3.	"Eclipse"	S. Groth	5:57
4.	"Help Me!"	Vegard Blomberg, S. Groth	5:47
5.	"Kathy's Song (Come Lie Next to Me)"	S. Groth	6:34
6.	"Untitled 3"	S. Groth	2:38
7.	"Moment of Tranquility"	Jonas Groth, S. Groth	7:36
8.	"Fade to Black" (Metallica cover)	Cliff Burton, Kirk Hammett, James Hetfield, Lars Ulrich	5:27
9.	"64k"	S. Groth	1:44
10.	"Paranoia"	Blomberg, S. Groth	7:48
11.	"Soultaker"	S. Groth	7:00
12.	"LNDP3"	Blomberg, Frederik Ball, S. Groth	5:20
13.	"Time to Move On" (The song "Time to Move On" ends at 2:30. After 6:30 of silence, at 9:00 begins a hidden track, called "Untitled 4".)	S. Groth	11:06

=== 2007 remastered release ===
No.	Title	Writer(s)	Length
13.	"Time to Move On"	S. Groth	2:30
14.	"Untitled 4" (bonus track; in other versions, "Untitled 4" is the hidden track after "Time to Move On".)	S. Groth	2:08
15.	"Eclipse" (Black Sun Version)	S. Groth	5:17
16.	"64k" (Sweep Remix)	S. Groth	6:46

== Charts ==
Chart performance for Welcome to Earth
Chart (2000)	Peak position
German Albums (Offizielle Top 100)	59
DAC Top 50 Albums	4
CMJ RPM Charts (U.S.)	5
CMJ Radio 200 (U.S.)	134

The single "Eclipse" ranked #41 on the German Alternative Charts (DAC) 1999 Top 50 Singles chart. "Kathy's Song" peaked at #16 on the CMJ RPM Charts in the U.S.

== Trivia ==
"Untitled 4" features a hidden-message which can only be heard by isolating either the left or right channel (converting the track directly to mono will not work). The message begins (post isolation) at around 42 seconds into the track and begins "If you can hear me, you are listening in mono", followed by a brief musical-interlude, after which the track-listing from the original-release then read out, finishing at track 13 ("Untitled 4" is not named).

In the read-out, track 7, "Moment of Tranquillity", is read-aloud as "The Tranquillity Song", which may have been an earlier-title. "LNDP3" is also read-out as "Love Never Dies, Part 3", not in its acronym form. In the 2007 remaster, the hidden-message in "Untitled 4" is the same as the 2000 release, and does not correct these titles, nor references the two extra-tracks added in that release.
