= Leiahdorus =

Synthpop band

- Genres: Synthpop
- Years active: 1998–present
- Labels: Section 44 Records
- Members: Jason Smith; Darla Van Winkle; Fox Fletcher; Ryan Goodman

Leiahdorus is a synthpop band on the independent Section 44 Records label.

Leiahdorus was created by Jason Smith in 1998. When Joey Belville of The Echoing Green acquired a demonstration tape, he took Jason under his wing and produced a demo with him.

In 2000 this three track demo found its way to Todd Durrant of the synthpop label A Different Drum. This resulted in Jason being signed to an album deal. Ashes, Ashes was then released in September 2001, which has created a strong following of fans.

Jason has played shows in Albuquerque and California, and a world-wide fan base has grown using the Internet as a form of marketing and distribution for the debut album.

In 2003, Darla Van Winkle joined the band, followed shortly by the return of former member Fox Fletcher in 2004.

The latest album, "Ode to the Builders", was released in May 2010.

== Discography ==
=== Albums ===
Year	Title
2002	Ashes Ashes
2005	Parallel Universe
2010	Ode to the Builders

=== Extended plays ===
Year	Title	Notes
2009	Sirens	5 track EP

=== Singles ===
Year	Title	Album
2001	Wake	Ashes Ashes
2002	Indigent	Ashes Ashes
2005	Kiss on the Telephone	Parallel Universe
