= Kurt Ebelhäuser =

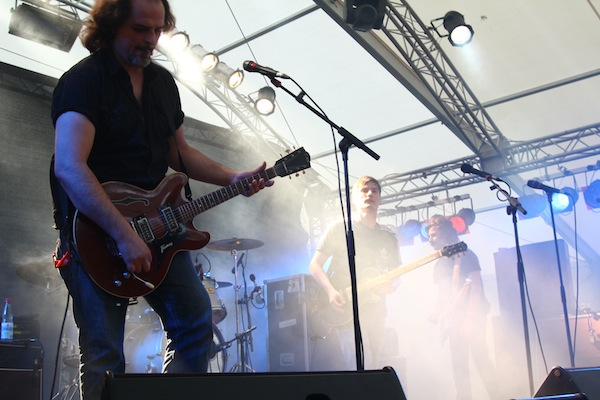
- Ebelhäuser in 2011

Background information
- Also known as: Kurt Ebelhäuser
- Origin: Koblenz, Germany
- Genres: Indie rock; alternative rock
- Occupations: Singer-songwriter; guitarist; record producer
- Instruments: Guitar; vocals
- Years active: 1996–present

Kurt Ebelhäuser (Kurt Ebelhaeuser in English) is a German musician and record producer from Koblenz, probably best known for his work as guitarist for the indie rock band blackmail. He is also singer and guitarist for another indie rock band Scumbucket, which he formed in 1996. Both bands released several albums to high critical acclaim and toured extensively throughout Europe and Japan.

As a record producer he worked with bands such as Harmful (Sis Masis), Donots (Coma Chameleon and Lauter Als Bomben), Long Distance Calling (Avoid the Light), and Guano Apes (Offline). He is a founder of his own recording studio Tonstudio 45.

== Discography ==
with blackmail

- Blackmail (1997)
- Science Fiction (1999)
- Bliss, Please (2001)
- Friend or Foe? (2003)
- Kammerflimmern (Original Motion Picture Soundtrack) (2005)
- Aerial View (2006)
- Tempo Tempo (2008)
- Anima Now! (2011)
- II (2013)

with Scumbucket

- Heliophobe (1997)
- Batuu (1998)
- Finistra (2000)
- Aficionados (2002)
- Kiss Than Kind (2005)
- Heliophobia (2009)
- Sarsaparilla (2010)
