= You and Me Against the World =

Studio album by Apoptygma Berzerk
- Released: 12 September 2005
- Genre: Futurepop, alternative rock, electronic rock
- Length: 40:19
- Label: Metropolis
- Producer: Apoptygma Berzerk

Apoptygma Berzerk chronology
The Singles Collection (2003)	You and Me Against the World (2005)	Sonic Diary (2006)

Singles from You and Me Against the World
- 1. "In This Together" Released: 22 August 2005; 2. "Shine On" Released: 6 January 2006; 3. "Love to Blame" Released: 16 June 2006; 4. "Cambodia" Released: 1 December 2006

Professional ratings
Review scores
Source	Rating
AllMusic	4/5 stars

You and Me Against the World is the fifth studio album from Norwegian electronic rock music band Apoptygma Berzerk. The album was released in 2005, and gave way to a very different sound in the band, whereas previous records had a more traditional electric synthpop/EBM sound, You and Me Against the World features a more mainstream, rock-oriented sound. It is the band's most successful album to date.

== Track listing ==
Standard edition
No.	Title	Length
1.	"Tuning in Again"	1:15
2.	"In This Together"	4:26
3.	"Love to Blame"	3:49
4.	"You Keep Me from Breaking Apart"	3:30
5.	"Cambodia" (Kim Wilde cover)	4:20
6.	"Back on Track" (featuring Anneli Drecker)	3:37
7.	"Tuning in to the Frequency of Your Soul"	3:34
8.	"Mercy Kill"	3:10
9.	"Lost in Translation"	4:35
10.	"Maze" (featuring Mortiis)	3:22
11.	"Into the Unknown"	3:41
12.	"Shine On" (The House of Love cover) (bonus track)	3:10
13.	"Is Electronic Love to Blame?" (Bonus Track)	4:34

North American edition
No.	Title	Length
1.	"Tuning in Again"	1:15
2.	"In This Together"	4:26
3.	"You Keep Me from Breaking Apart"	3:30
4.	"Love to Blame"	3:49
5.	"Back on Track" (featuring Anneli Drecker)	3:37
6.	"Cambodia" (Kim Wilde cover)	4:20
7.	"Faceless Fear"	4:39
8.	"Tuning in to the Frequency of Your Soul"	3:34
9.	"Mercy Kill"	3:10
10.	"Lost in Translation"	4:35
11.	"Black Pawn"	4:29
12.	"Maze" (featuring Mortiis)	3:22
13.	"Into the Unknown"	3:41
14.	"Is Electronic Love to Blame?"	4:34

Australian tour edition
No.	Title	Length
1.	"Tuning in Again"	1:15
2.	"In This Together"	4:26
3.	"Love to Blame"	3:49
4.	"You Keep Me from Breaking Apart"	3:30
5.	"Back on Track" (featuring Anneli Drecker)	3:37
6.	"Tuning in to the Frequency of Your Soul"	3:34
7.	"Mercy Kill"	3:10
8.	"Lost in Translation"	4:35
9.	"Maze" (featuring Mortiis)	3:22
10.	"Into the Unknown"	3:41
11.	"Black Pawn"	4:29
12.	"Friendly Fire" (featuring Vilde Lockert)	3:29
13.	"Unicorn" (Live version record at M'era Luna Festival)	4:17
14.	"Until the End of the World" (acoustic version)	3:03
15.	"Mourn" (Mesh Remix)	4:13

== Charts ==
Chart performance for You and Me Against the World
Chart (2005)	Peak position
German Albums (Offizielle Top 100)	18
German Alternative Charts (DAC)	2
