= Blackmail (band) =

German alternative rock band

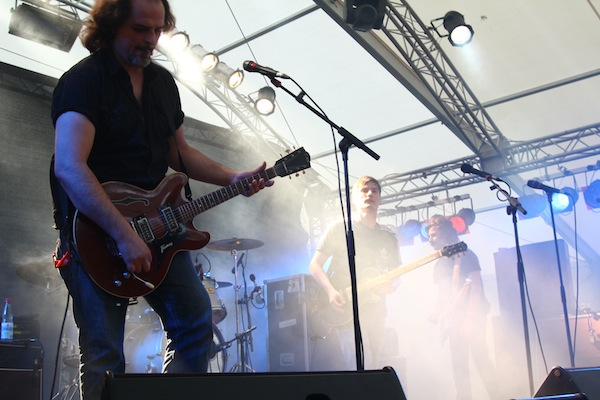
- Kurt Ebelhäuser, Mario Matthias, Mathias Reetz, Carlos Ebelhäuser (2011)

Background information
- Origin: Koblenz, Germany
- Genres: Alternative rock, indie rock, progressive rock, electronic
- Years active: 1993–present
- Labels: BluNoise, Speicherstadt, WEA, City Slang, 45
- Members: Kurt Ebelhäuser; Carlos Ebelhäuser; Mario Matthias; Mathias Reetz
- Past members: Aydo Abay
- Website: www.blackmail-music.com

Blackmail is a German alternative rock band from Koblenz, Germany which was started briefly in 1993. Blackmail are singer Mathias Reetz, brothers Kurt Ebelhäuser (lead guitars) and Carlos Ebelhäuser (bass) and drummer Mario Matthias. Their style of music usually varies, but mainly consists of the indie rock genre which is combined with experimentation of electronic music, progressive rock, alternative rock and dance. It is also known for its harsh and high-pitched guitar melodies.

== Career history ==
=== Formation (1993–1996) ===
The band is said to be greatly influenced by sounds of the 1960s and the 1980s, particularly artists such as The Beatles, The Who and Depeche Mode. The band was initially formed through a local magazine known as "Visions" that had a contact advertisement for new musicians. As a demo recording, they initially recorded a number of songs in an old 8-Track studio that belonged to Kurt. They sent the demo tape to multiple recording studios.

The response from the studios was quite shaky, but they were able to engage in the services of recording legend, Stuart Bruce, who had just moved into the area of Koblenz. Stuart owned a very advanced recording studio in his house. With some luck they were able to record eight songs in three months. After that, they went ahead to search for a recording studio, and this time, responses were much more positive. Their first live performance was in a club located in Bonn known as Carpe Noctem as a sample for a scout from Virgin Records who had come there to judge their performance. Due to an "unpredictable incident" that occurred, however, they were not taken into Virgin Records. As Abay explained on the biography section of the site:

Prior to the show, one good-humoured and extremely drunk black guy took great pleasure in presenting his genitals to everyone in the crowd. The scout from Virgin was disgusted and left early. When we met him after the concert, he apologised for doing so. He also announced that he wasn't going to take us in.

=== Blackmail and Science Fiction (1997–1999) ===
Instead they managed to approach Guido Lucas, who had started his own label "bluNoise Records". They recorded their first album, Blackmail, late in 1996. After presenting it to Guido, he decided to release it the fall of 1997. Stuart Bruce, who currently works at Peter Gabriel's Real World Studios, produced the band's first demo recordings from this album.

In October 1997, they went on their first ever tour, that was in conjunction with the album release alongside Swedish rock band B-Thong. Unfortunately the first album release did not go that smoothly. During the tour, however, they played various one-off shows in numerous places, including Austria.

Two years later, they released their second album Science Fiction. Surprisingly, reactions were really much better, there were many positive reactions in all directions. So much so that they were asked to participate in festivals like Rock am Ring and the Bizarre Festival. They were also supported by the Manic Street Preachers. After Science Fiction, they were approached by many music label companies, finally the band decided to sign a contract with the Warner Music sub-label "Speicherstadt". In 2000, the band released an entirely remixed version of Science Fiction entitled Do Robots Dream of Electric Sheep? under this label.

=== Bliss, Please, Friend or Foe? and Summer Sonic (2001–2004) ===
Following a continuous tour throughout Germany, they started recording Bliss, Please in the summer of 2000. After its release in 2001, songs such as "Same Sane", "A Reptile For The Saint" and "Ken I Die" became exceptionally popular. Blackmail also gained recognition worldwide due to this album release. The first single, "Same Sane", came out in February 2001. It was extremely popular in Germany. Their first music video release, "Same Sane", as well as the other videos from Bliss, Please first aired on VIVA 2 (VIVA Zwei), a subsidiary of popular German music video channel, VIVA. At the end of 2001, they were informed that Speicherstadt was going to close down.

From this point on they signed their further contracts with the mother-label: The Warner/Elektra/Atlantic recording group, now known as the Warner Music Group. WEA had given them their own studio in 2002, and since Kurt had produced all their work in the previous album, they decided to record their next album, Friend or Foe?, in midway 2002. During recording the album, they recorded 28 songs. Out of these, only 11 songs made it into the album. Completing the album in February 2003, they released it on May 26, 2003. From the album, the first single was "It Could Be Yours". From the album they also released an EP entitled Foe in which they packed four other songs.

Following this release, the band went on a tour to Japan to perform in the Summer Sonic Festival in 2004. They also released an export version of Bliss, Please in Japan in 2005.

During this time, they released a special version of Friend or Foe? with bonus tracks, as well as an album entitled The Lost Summer (a.k.a. The Ventricular EP). Both albums, which were released exclusively in Japan, are still available for purchase on Amazon Deutschland.

=== Kammerflimmern and Aerial View ===
In 2005, they met with producer Hendrik Hölzemann and German techno artist, Lee Buddah to compose the soundtrack for the German film "Kammerflimmern" (Off Beat) which starred Matthias Schweighöfer and Jessica Schwarz. In the same year, they signed a contract with City Slang/Rough Trade and approached producer Andi Jung to help them mix tracks for their next album. After all the necessary preparations they released their latest album, Aerial View, January 13, 2006, and were on tour in countries such as Austria and Switzerland to promote it. One track, "Never Forever", which originally appeared on Kammerflimmern's soundtrack was also re-released in Aerial View.

=== Tempo Tempo (2008–present) ===
In 2008, Blackmail released their album Tempo Tempo. On December 11, 2008 Blackmail announced the separation from lead singer Aydo Abay for personal reasons and aborted their tour.

In 2010, Mathias Reetz joined the band and they started recording a new album with the working title Judas Love in March 2010.

In March 2011 the song "Deborah" was released as a free download. The album now titled Anima Now! was released April 29, 2011 on their own label "45 Records". on February 22, 2013, the second album without Abay, II, was released.

== Band members ==
- Aydo Abay — vocals, synthesizers, guitars (1997–2008)
- Kurt Ebelhäuser — guitars, additional vocals, sampling (1997–present)
- Carlos Ebelhäuser — bass, additional vocals (1997–present)
- Mario Matthias — drums (1997–present)
- Mathias Reetz — vocals, guitars (2010–present)

== Discography ==
=== Studio albums ===
- Blackmail (October 10, 1997) bluNoise Records
- Science Fiction (January 29, 1999) bluNoise Records
- Bliss, Please (May 25, 2001) Speicherstadt
- Friend or Foe? (May 26, 2003) Warner Music Group
- Aerial View (January 13, 2006) City Slang Records
- Tempo Tempo (March 28, 2008) City Slang Records
- Anima Now! (April 29, 2011) 45 Records (Soulfood)
- II (February 22, 2013) 45 Records (Unter Schafen/Alive)

=== Singles and EPs ===
- "Nostra" (Single from Science Fiction) - (1998)
- "Same Sane" (single from Bliss, Please) - (2001)
- "Ken I Die" (single from Bliss, Please) - (2001)
- "A Reptile for the Saint" (single from Bliss, Please) - (2002)
- The Light of the Son Is the Son of the Light (EP) - (2002)
- It Could Be Yours (EP) - (2003)
- Foe (EP) - (2003)
- The Ventricular EP (a.k.a. The Lost Summer) (EP) - (2005) (Japan-only release)
- "Soulblind" (single from Aerial View) - (2005)
- "Moonpigs" (single from Aerial View) - (2006)
- "Never forever" (Single from Aerial View) - (2006)
- The Mad Luv EP - (2008)
- "Shshshame" (Single from Tempo Tempo) - (2008)
- "The Good Part/Feel It Day by Day" (Single from Tempo Tempo) - (2008)
- "Night School" - (2011)
- "Bugs" - (2011)
- "Deborah" - (2011)

=== Remix albums ===
- Do Robots Dream of Electric Sheep? (remix of Science Fiction) - February 4, 2000 (Speicherstadt)

=== Soundtracks ===
- Off Beat OST/Kammerflimmern OST (movie soundtrack - music by Lee Buddah and Blackmail) - January 31, 2005 (Rough Trade Records)
