= Aydo Abay =

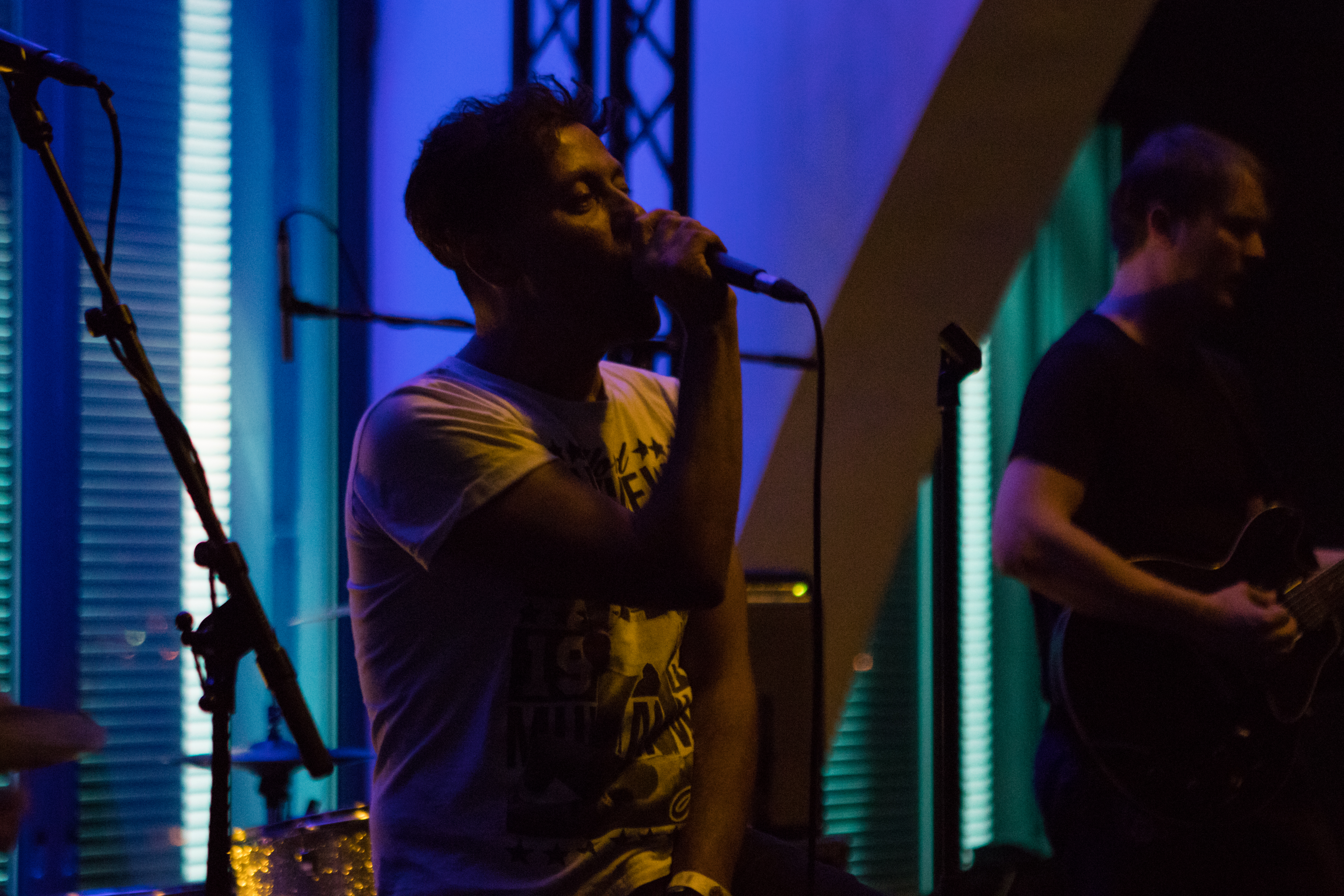
- Aydo Abay with his Band Abay (2017)

Background information
- Also known as: Aydos
- Born: May 29, 1973 (age 52)
- Origin: Koblenz, Germany
- Genres: Indie rock
- Occupation(s): Singer, songwriter
- Instrument(s): Vocals, guitars, keyboards
- Years active: 1995–present
- Labels: Strange Ways Records; Metropolis Records(for U. S. distribution); City Slang Records
- Formerly of: Blackmail
- Website: www.blackmail-music.com

Aydo Abay (born May 29, 1973) is a German singer and songwriter raised in Koblenz, Germany. He is of Turkish descent. Abay is mainly known for being the frontman for the German indie rock quartet Blackmail (1995–2008). He has also started his own solo band project known as "KEN".

== Discography ==
- With KEN
  - Have A Nice Day (2002)
  - Stronger (2005)
  - I Am Thief (2005)
  - Stop! Look! Sing Songs Of Revolution! (2005)
  - Yes We (2010)
- With DuMonde
  - Gun (2007)
- With Blackmail
