= Soli Deo Gloria (album) =

Studio album by Apoptygma Berzerk
- Released: 11 November 1993; Re-issued 12 October 2007
- Genre: EBM; electro; synth-pop; futurepop
- Length: 47:09
- Label: Tatra

Apoptygma Berzerk chronology
The 2nd Manifesto (1992)	Soli Deo Gloria (1993)	7 (1996)

Singles from Soli Deo Gloria
- 1. "Ashes to Ashes" Released: 23 April 1991; 2. "Bitch" Released: 1 May 1993

Re-issue cover

Soli Deo Gloria is the first studio album by Norwegian futurepop band Apoptygma Berzerk. It was originally released in 1993 and gained the band attention the world over. It had been out of print for years until it was remastered and reissued in 2003 by Tatra Records and then again in 2007 as a digital release. It was re-issued as a deluxe remaster edition with a digipak cover in 2008. The album was once again reissued by Tatra Records in 2018 for the 25th anniversary of the original release and was remastered for vinyl and CD, the vinyl edition having remastered versions of all 13 of the original tracks while the CD version adds seven bonus tracks four of which were previously unreleased. A remix album called SDGXXV was also released alongside the remaster.

"Ashes To Ashes '93" is an updated version of the song "Ashes to Ashes" found on the band's first single of the same name.

All Tomorrow's Parties is a The Velvet Underground cover.

== Track listing ==
No.	Title	Length
1.	"Like Blood from the Beloved (Part 1)"	1:31
2.	"Bitch"	4:25
3.	"Burnin' Heretic" (Album Version)	5:33
4.	"Stitch"	3:06
5.	"Walk With Me"	1:40
6.	"Backdraft"	4:23
7.	"Arp" (808 Edit)	2:10
8.	"Spiritual Reality"	4:38
9.	"Skyscraping" (Schizophreniac)	7:13
10.	"All Tomorrow's Parties" (The Velvet Underground cover)	5:05
11.	"The Sentinel"	1:12
12.	"Ashes to Ashes '93"	4:20
13.	"Like Blood from the Beloved (Part 2)"	1:53

=== Bonus tracks ===
Remastered 2003
No.	Title	Length
14.	"Burning Heretics" (feat. Jimmy Bergsten)	5:33

Deluxe release (2008)
No.	Title	Length
14.	"Burning Heretics" (Rock Furore Version)	5:34
15.	"Electronic Warfare" (Full Speed Ahead Version)	4:55
16.	"Arp" (Lo-fi Version)	3:37
