= A Different Drum =

American independent record label and online store

- Founded: 1996
- Founder: Todd Durrant
- Defunct: 2014
- Distributor: Various
- Genre: Synth-pop, electronic music, futurepop, dark wave, ebm
- Country of origin: U.S.
- Location: Smithfield, Utah

A Different Drum was an independent record label and an online store based in Smithfield, Utah, founded in 1996. The label specialized in synth-pop and related genres. A Different Drum has released hundreds of albums, singles, and compilations and was the biggest synthpop label in the U.S.

The label is credited with helping to keep the synth-pop genre progressing during the grunge rock mid-1990s and into the early 2000s, particularly supporting American Synthpop Groups (Cosmicity, the Echoing Green, B! Machine and others) in their early years. The label also supported older synthpop bands which previously had Billboard chart hits during the 1980s, such as Alphaville (band), and Real Life (band), putting out releases for both bands during this time.

In the early to mid 2000s, A Different Drum signed new acts such as Iris and Provision.

The label held a yearly Synthpop Music Festival which ran for 3 years, from 2004 to 2006; in Salt Lake City, Utah at the Red Lion Hotel. The festival featured label acts that were signed to A Different Drum, performing alongside new unsigned Synthpop bands in a musical showcase spanning three days over Labor Day weekend. The festivals were called ADD2K4, ADD2K5, and ADD2K6; respectively. The first year of the festival was recorded live and released as a 2 C.D. Limited Edition titled SLC 2K4 Official Bootleg.

A selection of songs from the label's artists have been featured on various versions of Konami's Dance Dance Revolution series, including the arcade version of Dance Dance Revolution X.

The label formally ceased operations in 2014.

A Different Drum published more than 350 albums, singles, and various artist compilations.

== Notable artists ==
- Alien#Six13
- Alphaville
- B! Machine
- Blu Mar Ten
- Blue October
- Blume
- Code 64
- Cosmicity
- Cut and Run
- De/Vision
- Daybehavior
- The Dignity of Labour
- Droom
- Echo Image
- The Echoing Green
- Endless Shame
- Faith Assembly
- Fischerspooner
- Freezepop
- Iris
- Jondi & Spesh
- Junk Circuit
- Leiahdorus
- Midnight Resistance
- Moulin Noir
- Neuroactive
- Neuropa
- Neverever
- Provision
- Raindancer
- Real Life
- Syrian
- T.O.Y.
