= Apoptygma Berzerk =

Norwegian band

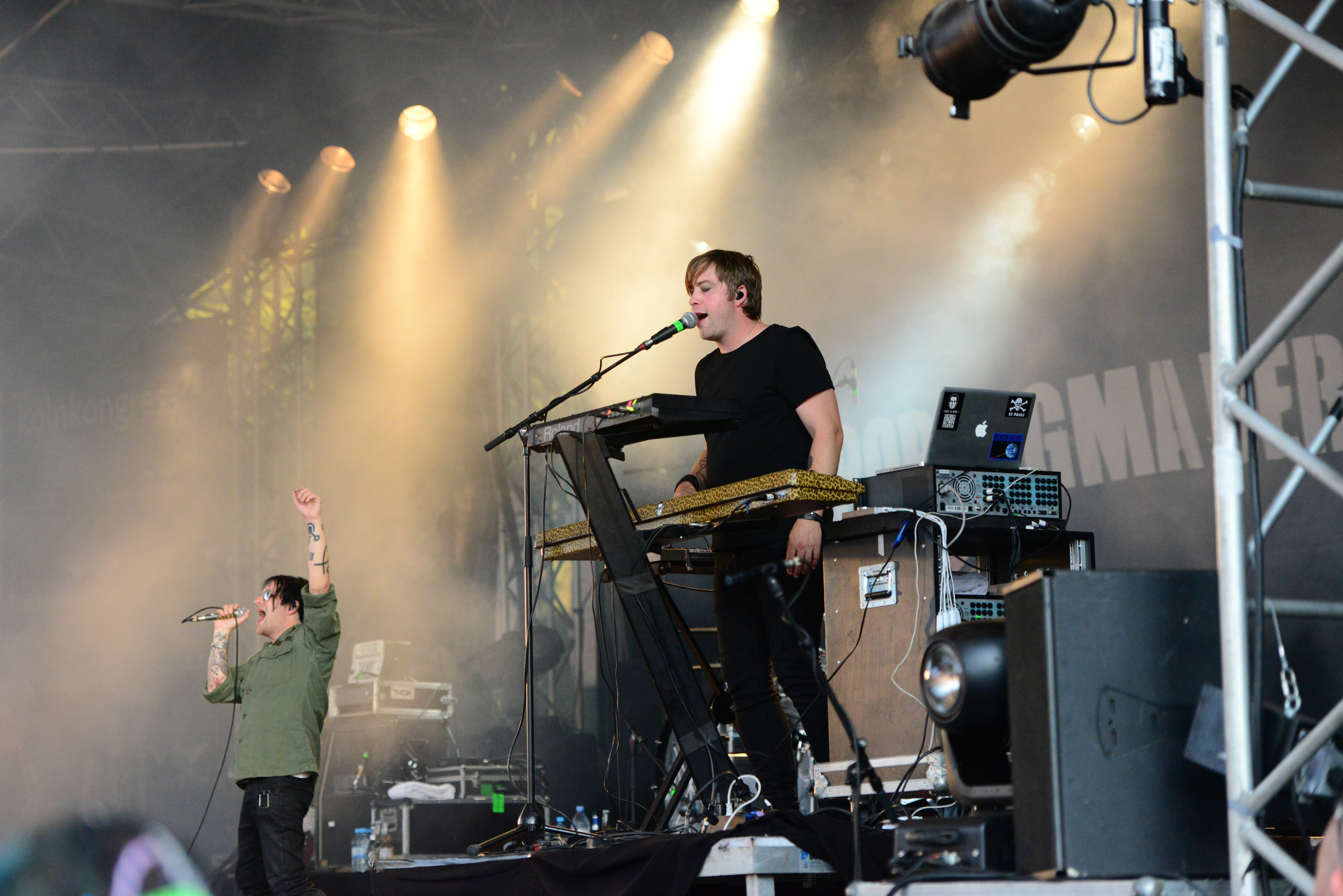
- Apoptygma Berzerk performing in 2014

Background information
- Also known as: APB, APOP
- Origin: Sarpsborg, Norway
- Genres: Electronic rock; industrial rock; futurepop; EBM; synth-pop
- Years active: 1989–present
- Labels: Pitch Black Drive, Columbia, Tatra, Gun, Metropolis, Artoffact, Hard:Drive
- Members: Stephan Groth; Audun Stengel; Ted Skogmann; Jonas Groth
- Past members: Jon Erik Martinsen; Geir Bratland; Fredrik Brarud; Anders Odden; Per Aksel Lundgreen; Fredrik Darum; Brandon Smith
- Website: theapboffice.com

Apoptygma Berzerk (/əˈpɒptɪɡmə/; commonly abbreviated to APB or APOP) is a Norwegian band that produces a style of electro rock, industrial rock, synth-pop and ballads backed with electronic rhythms, commonly known within the scene as "futurepop". Apoptygma Berzerk has won awards and top 10 spots in Germany and Scandinavia. Apoptygma Berzerk has toured Europe, North America, South America, Israel and Australia with bands such as VNV Nation, Beborn Beton, Icon of Coil and Unheilig.

== Formation ==
The band was formed by Stephan Groth and Jon Erik Martinsen in 1989. Martinsen left the band due to creative differences. The name "Apoptygma Berzerk" has no particular meaning; frontman and founding member Groth claims that it was randomly picked out of a dictionary (the first word being derived from the Ancient Greek word ἀπόπτυγμα meaning "piece of a tunic").

== Influences and style ==
Groth has cited influences including Kraftwerk, Tangerine Dream, Orchestral Manoeuvres in the Dark (OMD), Jean-Michel Jarre and John Carpenter. The first two albums, Soli Deo Gloria and 7, were a similar style of electropop and EBM. Welcome to Earth eschewed the dark themes of 7 for a lighter, less aggressive sound, and included a few experimental tracks. In Harmonizer the style changed a softer, more synthpop-oriented direction, compared to previous albums, and their 2006 album, You and Me Against the World, represented an almost complete change in style for the band. It featured a more mainstream, indie rock-oriented sound, and the complete departure from the band's traditional electric synthpop and EBM roots that started with 7. In 2009, they released their album Rocket Science.

Many albums feature a hidden track that can be accessed by fast forwarding through many minutes of silence on the last album track. For instance, on 7, one can hear a remix of Nonstop Violence after Love Never Dies (Part II).

== Members ==
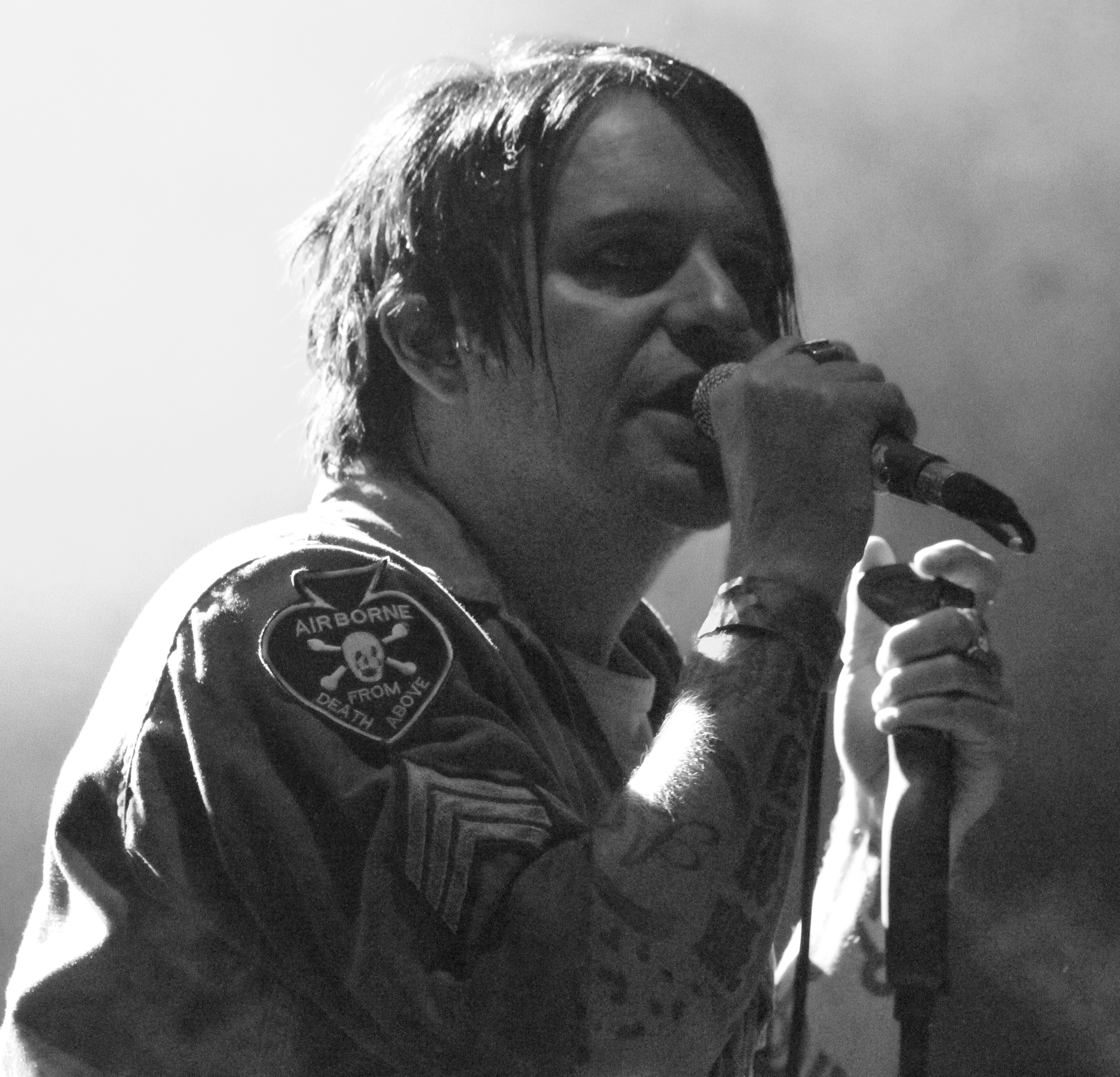
Stephan Groth at Wave-Gotik-Treffen 2014

=== Current members ===
- Stephan Groth (STP a/k/a Grothesk) – vocals, programming, guitar, samples (1989–present)
- Ted Skogmann – drums, additional guitar (1999–2002, 2011–present)
- Jonas Groth – keyboards, production (2009–present)
- Audun Stengel (Angel) – guitar (2002–2009, 2013–present)

=== Former members ===
- Geir Bratland – keyboards, backing vocals (1995–2009)
- Fredrik Brarud – drums (2002–2009)
- Brandon Smith – guitar (2009)
- Jon Erik Martinsen – keyboards (1989)
- Per Aksel Lundgreen – keyboards (1990–1994)
- Anders Odden – guitars (1992–1999, 2003–2006)
- Fredrik Darum – live guitar (1999–2001)
- Thomas Jakobsen – drums (2009–2011)

=== Live members ===
- Leandra Ophelia Dax – keyboards (2010–present)

== Other collaborators ==
- Vegard Blomberg of View
- Pål Magnus Rybom of Echo Image
- Claudia Brücken of Propaganda
- Benji Madden of Good Charlotte
- Amanda Palmer of The Dresden Dolls
- Emil Nikolaisen of Serena Maneesh
- Håvard Ellefsen of Mortiis
- Kurt Ebelhäuser of Blackmail
- Anneli Drecker of Bel Canto
- Alexander Odden of Pegboard Nerds
- Vile Electrodes

== Discography ==
=== Studio albums ===
- Soli Deo Gloria (1993)
- 7 (1996)
- Welcome to Earth (2000)
- Harmonizer (2002)
- You and Me Against the World (2005)
- Rocket Science (2009)
- Exit Popularity Contest (2016)
