= Stephan Groth =

Danish singer

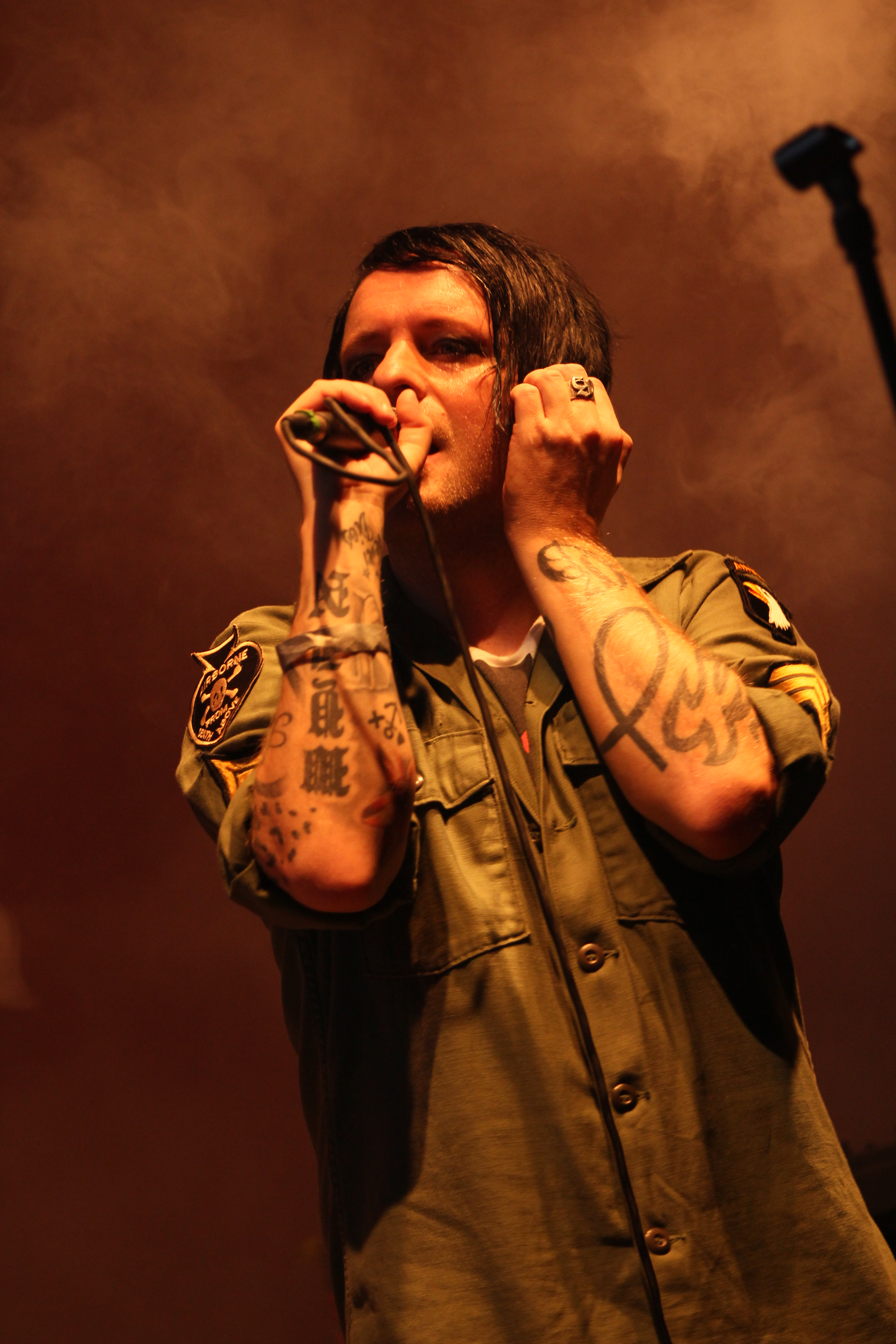
- Groth performing with Apoptygma Berzerk in 2014

Background information
- Born: 10 August 1971 (age 53)
- Origin: Odense, Denmark
- Genres: Futurepop, synth-pop
- Occupation: Singer

Stephan Groth (born 10 August 1971) is a Danish-Norwegian singer. He is the man behind Apoptygma Berzerk, an electronic body music act that plays in styles such as synthpop and futurepop.

Groth was born in Odense but relocated with his family to his father's home town Sarpsborg, Norway, in 1986.

Along with Ronan Harris of VNV Nation and the members of Covenant, he is considered by many to be one of the pioneers of the futurepop genre of the late 1990s and early 2000s. Groth is also a member of Fairlight Children, which is a lighter, more pop-oriented electronic act. Stephan had a guest appearance in Satyricon's album Megiddo.
