= List of Mayhem band members =

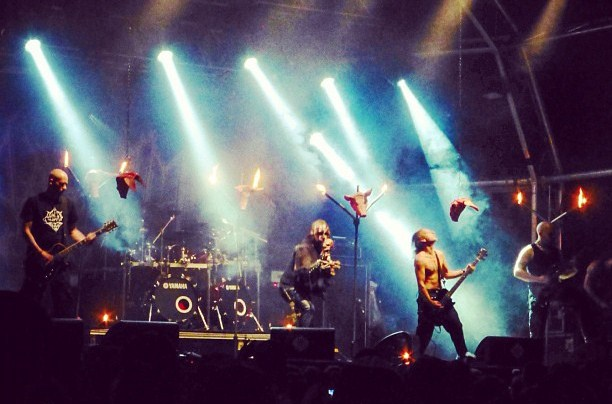
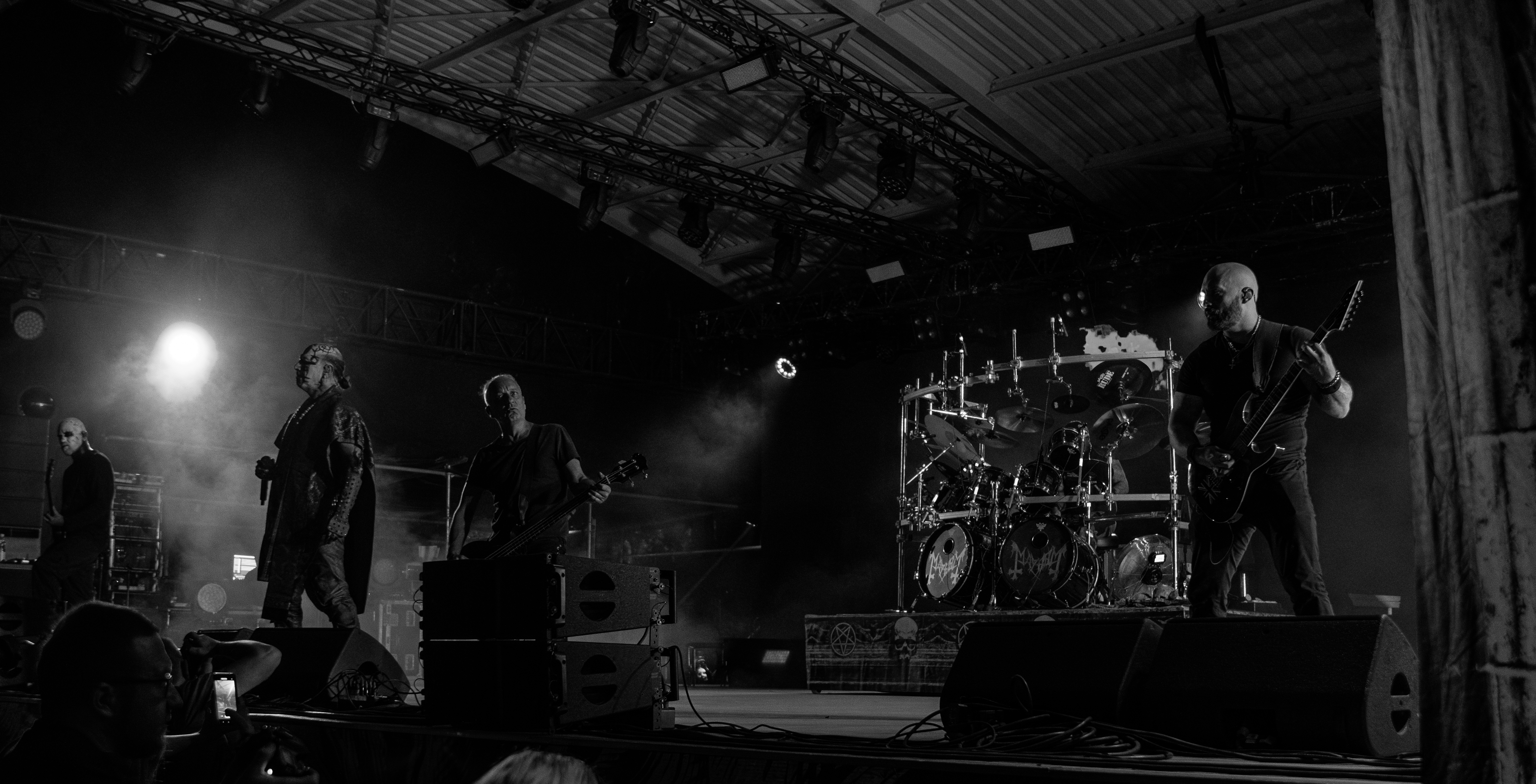
Mayhem performing in 2012 and 2024

Mayhem is a Norwegian black metal band from Oslo. Formed in 1984, the group originally featured guitarist Øystein "Euronymous" Aarseth (originally known as "Destructor"), bassist and vocalist Jørn "Necrobutcher" Stubberud and drummer Kjetil Manheim. The band's current lineup includes Necrobutcher (who rejoined in 1995 after originally leaving in 1991), drummer Jan Axel "Hellhammer" Blomberg (since 1988), vocalist Attila Csihar (first from 1992 to 1993, and since 2004), and guitarists Morten Bergeton "Teloch" Iversen (since 2011) and Charles "Ghul" Hedger (since 2012).

== History ==
=== 1984–1993 ===
Mayhem was formed in 1984 by Necrobutcher with Euronymous and Manheim. After two years of rehearsals, the trio released its first demo Pure Fucking Armageddon in early 1986. Shortly after its release, the group became a four-piece when Eirik "Messiah" Norheim took over vocals from Euronymous. Within a year, the vocalist had been replaced by Sven Erik "Maniac" Kristiansen, who performed on the group's first EP Deathcrush. Both Maniac and Manheim left shortly after the EP's release, and were briefly replaced by Vomit members Kittil Kittilsen and Torben Grue, respectively.

During early 1988, Euronymous and Necrobutcher rebuilt Mayhem with the addition of new vocalist Per "Dead" Ohlin and drummer Jan Axel "Hellhammer" Blomberg. The new incarnation remained stable for circa three l years, recording several live releases, but did not issue a full-length studio album. On 8 April 1991, Dead died by suicide at a house shared with Euronymous and Hellhammer. Due to his death, and the guitarist's subsequent actions (including taking photos of his body, one of which was later used as the cover for a bootleg release), Necrobutcher left Mayhem.

After a brief stint with Stian "Occultus" Johannsen, the band returned in late 1991 with Attila Csihar on vocals and Varg "Count Grishnackh" Vikernes on bass. This lineup recorded Mayhem's long-awaited full-length debut De Mysteriis Dom Sathanas, which featured material written by Dead and Necrobutcher. However, before it could be released, Vikernes murdered Euronymous on August 10, 1993, stabbing the guitarist 23 times after growing tensions and business disputes. The group consequently disbanded, with De Mysteriis Dom Sathanas receiving a release in 1994.

=== Since 1995 ===
In late 1995, Mayhem was reformed with a lineup including Hellhammer, former members Maniac (vocals) and Necrobutcher (bass), and new guitarist Rune "Blasphemer" Eriksen. This incarnation remained intact for almost nine years, issuing the group's second and third full-length studio albums, Grand Declaration of War and Chimera. In November 2004, Maniac left the band and was replaced by another former vocalist, Attila Csihar. One more album followed, Ordo Ad Chao, before Blasphemer left in August 2008 claiming that he "simply [didn't] see any future for me in the band anymore".

Blasphemer was replaced on tour by Krister "Morfeus" Dreyer starting in October 2008, who was joined by French guitarist Silmaeth starting in March 2009. Just under two years later, Silmaeth was replaced by Morten Bergeton "Teloch" Iversen, and in 2012 Morfeus was replaced by Charles "Ghul" Hedger.

== Members ==
=== Current ===
| Image | Name | Years active | Instruments | Release contributions |
|---|---|---|---|---|
| | Necrobutcher (Jørn Stubberud) | 1984–1991; 1995–present | bass; vocals (1984–1986) | all Mayhem releases, except De Mysteriis Dom Sathanas (1994), and Life Eternal (2008) |
| | Hellhammer (Jan Axel Blomberg) | 1988–1993; 1995–present | drums | all Mayhem releases from Studio Tracks (1990) onwards |
| | Attila Csihar | 1992–1993; 2004–present | vocals | De Mysteriis Dom Sathanas (1994); Mediolanum Capta Est (1999) – guest appearance on one track only; all Mayhem releases from Ordo Ad Chao (2007) onwards, except retrospective live releases |
| | Teloch (Morten Bergeton Iversen) | 2011–present | guitar | all Mayhem releases from Esoteric Warfare (2014) onwards, except retrospective live releases |
| | Ghul (Charles Hedger) | 2012–present | guitar | all Mayhem releases from Esoteric Warfare (2014) onwards, except retrospective live releases |

=== Former ===
| Image | Name | Years active | Instruments | Release contributions |
|---|---|---|---|---|
| | Euronymous (Øystein Aarseth) | 1984–1993 (until his death) | guitar; vocals (1984–1986) | all Mayhem releases from Pure Fucking Armageddon (1986) to Out from the Dark (1996); Life Eternal (2008); Live in Zeitz (2016); Live in Sarpsborg (2017); Live in Jessheim (2017) |
| | Nils Brekke Svensson | 1984 (temporary) | vocals | none |
| | Ståle Redalen | 1984 (temporary) | vocals | none |
| | Per Nilsen | 1984 (temporary) | guitar | none |
| | Kjetil Manheim | 1984–1987 | drums; piano | Pure Fucking Armageddon (1986); Deathcrush (1987); The Dawn of the Black Hearts (1995) – bonus tracks only |
| | Messiah (Eirik Norheim) | 1986 | vocals | Deathcrush (1987) – three tracks only, The Dawn of the Black Hearts (1995) – Bonus tracks only, Atavistic Black Disorder / Kommando (2021) – guest appearance on 1 track |
| | Maniac (Sven Erik Kristiansen) | 1986–1987; 1995–2004 | vocals | Deathcrush (1987); all Mayhem releases from Wolf's Lair Abyss (1997) to Chimera (2004); and Atavistic Black Disorder / Kommando (2021) – guest appearance on 1 track |
| | Kittil Kittilsen | 1987–1988 (temporary) | vocals | none |
| | Torben Grue | 1987–1988 (temporary) | drums | none |
| | Dead (Per Ohlin) | 1988–1991 (until his death) | vocals | Studio Tracks (1990); Live in Leipzig (1993); The Dawn of the Black Hearts (1995); Out from the Dark (1996); Live in Zeitz (2016); Live in Sarpsborg (2017); Live in Jessheim (2017) |
| | Occultus (Stian Johannsen) | 1991 | vocals; bass | Helvete (The Occultus Sessions 1991) |
| | Count Grishnackh (Varg Vikernes) | 1992–1993 | bass | De Mysteriis Dom Sathanas (1994); Life Eternal (2008) |
| | Blackthorn (Snorre Ruch) | 1992–1993 | rhythm guitar | De Mysteriis Dom Sathanas (1994) (songwriting only) |
| | Blasphemer (Rune Eriksen) | 1995–2008 | guitar; bass (2006) | all Mayhem releases from Wolf's Lair Abyss (1997) to Ordo Ad Chao (2007) |
| | Alexander Nordgaren | 1997–1998 (touring only) | guitar | none |
| | Sanrabb (Morten Furuly) | 2004 (touring only) | guitar | none |
| | Ihizahg (Tom Johansen) | 2004–2005 (touring only) | guitar | none |
| | Morfeus (Krister Dreyer) | 2008–2012 (touring only) | guitar | none |
| | Silmaeth (aka Vagus Nox, real name unknown) | 2009–2011 (touring only) | guitar | none |

== Lineups ==
| Period | Members | Releases |
|---|---|---|
| 1984 – early 1986 | Euronymous – guitar, vocals; Necrobutcher – bass, vocals; Manheim – drums | Pure Fucking Armageddon (1986) |
| Early – late 1986 | Messiah – vocals; Euronymous – guitar, vocals; Necrobutcher – bass, vocals; Manheim – drums, piano, vocals | Deathcrush (1987) |
| Late 1986 – late 1987 | Maniac – vocals; Euronymous – guitar, vocals; Necrobutcher – bass, vocals; Manheim – drums, piano, vocals | Deathcrush (1987) |
| Late 1987 – early 1988 | Kittil Kittilsen – vocals; Euronymous – guitar; Necrobutcher – bass; Torben Grue – drums | none |
| Early 1988 – April 1991 | Dead – vocals; Euronymous – guitar; Necrobutcher – bass; Hellhammer – drums | Studio Tracks (1990); Live in Leipzig (1993); Dawn of the Black Hearts (1995); Out from the Dark (1996); Live in Zeitz (2016); Live in Jessheim (2017); Live in Sarpsborg (2019) |
| Mid–late 1991 | Occultus – vocals, bass; Euronymous – guitar; Hellhammer – drums | none |
| Late 1991 – August 1993 | Attila Csihar – vocals; Euronymous – lead guitar; Count Grishnackh – bass; Hellhammer – drums; Blackthorn – rhythm guitar | De Mysteriis Dom Sathanas (1994); Life Eternal (2008) |
Band inactive August 1993 – late 1995
| Late 1995 – November 2004 | Maniac – vocals; Blasphemer – guitar; Necrobutcher – bass; Hellhammer – drums | Wolf's Lair Abyss (1997); Live in Bischofswerda (1998); Mediolanum Capta Est (1999); Grand Declaration of War (2000); Live in Marseille 2000 (2001); European Legions (2001); Chimera (2004) |
| November 2004 – August 2008 | Attila Csihar – vocals; Blasphemer – guitar, bass; Necrobutcher – bass; Hellhammer – drums | Ordo Ad Chao (2007) |
| October 2008 – March 2009 | Attila Csihar – vocals; Morfeus – guitar (touring only); Necrobutcher – bass; Hellhammer – drums | none |
| March 2009 – February 2011 | Attila Csihar – vocals; Morfeus – guitar (touring only); Silmaeth – guitar (touring only); Necrobutcher – bass; Hellhammer – drums | none |
| February 2011 – late 2012 | Attila Csihar – vocals; Morfeus – guitar (touring only); Teloch – guitar; Necrobutcher – bass; Hellhammer – drums | none |
| Late 2012 – present | Attila Csihar – vocals; Teloch – guitar; Ghul – guitar; Necrobutcher – bass; Hellhammer – drums | Esoteric Warfare (2014); De Mysteriis Dom Sathanas Alive (2016); Live in Guatemala City (2017); Live in Montreal (2018); Daemon (2019); Atavistic Black Disorder/Kommando (2021) |

== Recording ==
| Album | Vocals | Guitar 1 | Guitar 2 | Bass | Drums |
|---|---|---|---|---|---|
| Pure Fucking Armageddon | Euronymous | | | Necrobutcher | Manheim |
| Death Rehearsal | Maniac | Euronymous | | Necrobutcher | Manheim |
| Deathcrush | Maniac (3 tracks) Messiah (3 tracks) | Euronymous | | Necrobutcher | Manheim |
| Studio Tracks | Dead | Euronymous | | Necrobutcher | Hellhammer |
| Only Death is Real | Dead | Euronymous | | Necrobutcher | Hellhammer |
| Live in Leipzig | Dead | Euronymous | | Necrobutcher | Hellhammer |
| De Mysteriis Dom Sathanas | Attila Csihar | Euronymous | Blackthorn | Count Grishnackh | Hellhammer |
| The Dawn of the Black Hearts | Dead | Euronymous | | Necrobutcher | Hellhammer |
| Wolf's Lair Abyss | Maniac | Blasphemer | | Necrobutcher | Hellhammer |
| Live in Bischofswerda | Maniac | Blasphemer | | Necrobutcher | Hellhammer |
| Mediolanum Capta Est | Maniac | Blasphemer | | Necrobutcher | Hellhammer |
| Grand Declaration of War | Maniac | Blasphemer | | Necrobutcher | Hellhammer |
| Live in Marseille 2000 | Maniac | Blasphemer | | Necrobutcher | Hellhammer |
| Chimera | Maniac | Blasphemer | | Necrobutcher | Hellhammer |
| Ordo Ad Chao | Attila Csihar | Blasphemer | | Necrobutcher | Hellhammer |
| Life Eternal | Attila Csihar | Euronymous | Blackthorn | Count Grishnackh | Hellhammer |
| Esoteric Warfare | Attila Csihar | Teloch | Ghul | Necrobutcher | Hellhammer |
| Live in Zeitz | Dead | Euronymous | | Necrobutcher | Hellhammer |
| De Mysteriis Dom Sathanas Alive | Attila Csihar | Teloch | Ghul | Necrobutcher | Hellhammer |
| Live in Guatemala City | Attila Csihar | Teloch | Ghul | Necrobutcher | Hellhammer |
| Live in Sarpsborg | Dead | Euronymous | | Necrobutcher | Hellhammer |
| Live in Jessheim | Dead | Euronymous | | Necrobutcher | Hellhammer |
| Daemon | Attila Csihar | Teloch | Ghul | Necrobutcher | Hellhammer |
| Atavistic Black Disorder / Kommando | Attila Csihar | Teloch | Ghul | Necrobutcher | Hellhammer |
| Daemonic Rites | Attila Csihar | Teloch | Ghul | Necrobutcher | Hellhammer |
| Live in Ski | Messiah | Euronymous | | Necrobutcher | Manheim |
