= Originators of the Northern Darkness – A Tribute to Mayhem =

Compilation album by Various artists
- Released: May 2, 2001
- Recorded: 1998–2000
- Genre: Black metal
- Length: 62:29
- Label: Avantgarde Music

Originators of the Northern Darkness is a tribute album to the Norwegian black metal band Mayhem, with contributions from some of the leading bands in the black metal and death metal scenes. All the songs were recorded between 1998 and 2000 in various locations, and the album was released on CD in 2001 by Avantgarde Music. In addition to the regular CD, a limited edition CD in black leather was also released. The album was re-released on digipack CD in 2007 by Peaceville.

== Track listing ==
1. "From the Dark Past" – Immortal – 04:40
  - Originally appeared on De Mysteriis Dom Sathanas.
2. "Pagan Fears" – Dark Funeral – 06:34
  - Originally appeared on De Mysteriis Dom Sathanas.
3. "Freezing Moon" – Vader – 05:45
  - Originally appeared on De Mysteriis Dom Sathanas.
4. "Funeral Fog" – Emperor – 05:13
  - Originally appeared on De Mysteriis Dom Sathanas.
5. "Carnage" – Behemoth – 04:07
  - Originally appeared on Pure Fucking Armageddon.
6. "De Mysteriis Dom Sathanas" – Limbonic Art – 06:51
  - Originally appeared on De Mysteriis Dom Sathanas.
7. "Buried by Time and Dust" – Keep of Kalessin – 03:34
  - Originally appeared on De Mysteriis Dom Sathanas.
8. "Life Eternal" – Gorgoroth – 04:45
  - Originally appeared on De Mysteriis Dom Sathanas.
9. "Ghoul" – Carpathian Forest – 03:41
  - Originally appeared on Pure Fucking Armageddon.
10. "I Am Thy Labyrinth" – Seth – 05:29
  - Originally appeared on Wolf's Lair Abyss.
11. "Cursed in Eternity" – Gehenna – 04:58
  - Originally appeared on De Mysteriis Dom Sathanas.
12. "Deathcrush" – Absu – 06:52
  - Originally appeared on Deathcrush.

Gorgoroth's line-up on track 8 consisted of Gaahl on vocals, Infernus and Tormentor on rhythm guitars, T-Reaper on lead guitar and bass, and Vrolok on drums.

Seth's track is mistitled as the original Mayhem version is titled "I am thy labyrinth". It is also mistitled on Osmose Productions' "World Domination IV" compilation (2000) on which it appears too.
