= Mayhem discography =

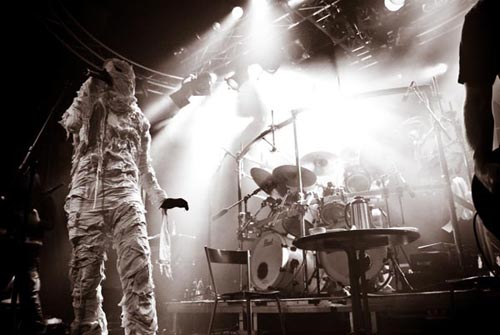
- Mayhem performing at Hole in the Sky, Bergen Metal Fest 2007
- Studio albums: 7
- Extended plays: 4
- Live albums: 5
- Compilation albums: 3
- Singles: 3
- Video albums: 4

This is a comprehensive discography of Mayhem, a black metal band formed in 1984 in Oslo, Norway. Mayhem has released seven studio albums, five live albums, two EPs, six demos and singles, three compilation albums and four video albums.

== Studio albums ==
Title	Album details	Peak chart positions							Sales
Title	Album details	NOR	AUT	FIN	SWE	SWI	UK Rock & Metal	US Heat.	Sales
De Mysteriis Dom Sathanas	Released: 24 May 1994; Label: Deathlike Silence, Century Black; Formats: CD, CS, LP, digital download	35	—	—	—	—	—	—	
Grand Declaration of War	Released: 27 March 2000; Label: Season of Mist, Necropolis Records; Formats: CD, CS, LP, digital download	—	—	—	—	—	—	—	
Chimera	Released: 17 January 2004; Label: Season of Mist; Formats: CD, CS, LP, digital download	28	—	—	—	—	—	—	
Ordo Ad Chao	Released: 16 April 2007; Label: Season of Mist; Formats: CD, CS, LP, digital download	12	—	—	57	—	26	—	
Esoteric Warfare	Released: 6 June 2014; Label: Season of Mist; Formats: CD, CS, LP, digital download	—	—	32	—	—	—	14	US: 1,900+
Daemon	Released: 25 October 2019; Label: Century Media; Formats: CD, digital download, streaming	—	35	8	32	37	8	—	
Liturgy of Death	Released: 6 February 2026; Label: Century Media; Formats: CD, digital download, streaming	34	3	10	—	10	7	—	
"—" denotes a recording that did not chart or was not released in that territory.

== Live albums ==
Year	Title	Details
1993	Live in Leipzig	Recorded: 1990; Released: 1993; Label: Obscure Plasma Records, Avantgarde Records
1995	The Dawn of the Black Hearts	Recorded: 28 February 1990; Released: 17 February 1995; Label: Warmaster Records; Bootleg release
1999	Mediolanum Capta Est	Released: 7 December 1999; Label: Avant Garde
2001	Live in Marseille 2000	Released: 16 June 2001; Label: Black Metal Records
2016	Live in Zeitz	Recorded: 1990; Released: 16 September 2016; Label: Peaceville
2016	De Mysteriis Dom Sathanas Alive	Released: 13 December 2016; Label: Mayhem Self-released
2017	Live in Jessheim	Recorded: 1990; Released: 3 November 2017; Label: Peaceville
2019	Live in Sarpsborg	Recorded: 1990; Released: 29 March 2019; Label: Peaceville
2023	Daemonic Rites	Recorded: 2022-2023; Released: 15 September 2023; Label: Century Media Records
2026	Live In Bischofswerda	Recorded: 21st June 1997; Label: Soulseller Records

== EPs ==
Year	Title	Details
1987	Deathcrush	Released: August 1987; Label: Posercorpse (1000 copies), Deathlike Silence (1993 reissue)
1997	Wolf's Lair Abyss	Released: 12 November 1997; Label: Misanthropy Records
2008	Life Eternal	Released: 20 October 2008; Label: Saturnus Production
2021	Atavistic Black Disorder / Kommando	Released: 9 July 2021; Label: Century Media

== Demos and singles ==
Year	Title	Notes
1986	Pure Fucking Armageddon	Instrumental recording. According to original drummer Manheim, Necrobutcher performed vocals during rehearsals
1987	Deathrehearsal	Recorded between 17 and 18 January 1987. It is the first Mayhem release to feature Maniac as official vocalist
1992	From The Darkest Past (Unofficial release)	Instrumental rehearsal featuring Euronymous, Varg, and Hellhammer
1996	Out from the Dark	Recorded in 1989
1996	Freezing Moon/Carnage	Recorded 29 April 1990. Only studio-quality Mayhem recording to feature Dead as vocalist
1997	Ancient Skin/Necrolust	
2009	Life Eternal	Demo versions of songs from De Mysteriis Dom Sathanas
2014	Psywar	
2019	Black Glass Communion	
2021	Voces Ab Alta	
2025	Weep for Nothing	
2025	Despair	
2026	Life is a Corpse You Drag	

Rarities

- War and Sodomy: track incorporated later into Ye Entrancemperium by Emperor.
- Visual Aggression: cover of Celtic Frost
- Anno Vampyr
- Into the Lifeless: bonus track on Japanese edition of Esoteric Warfare, originally from the Budapest Sessions (a scrapped album)
- From Beyond the Event Horizon: also taken from the Budapest Sessions. It is the B-side on the 2014 Psywar single.

== Compilation albums ==
Year	Title	Notes
2001	European Legions	Live songs and outtakes from Grand Declaration of War

== Box sets ==
Year	Title	Notes
2002	The Studio Experience	Vinyl collection; contains all previous albums
2018	A Season In Blasphemy 2018	Vinyl collection; contains all remixed and remastered songs

== Videography ==
Year	Title	Notes
1988	Rehearsal 1988	It is the only Mayhem recording where the faces of Dead and Euronymous are clearly visible.
1990	Live In Jessheim 1990	Released with Cursed In Eternity Box Set by Peaceville the entire video of the concert.
1990	Live In Sarpsborg 1990	A video released by Peaceville with a new video of the concert.
1998	Live In Bischofswerda	Recorded in June 1997. It is the first concert since the Izmir one in December 1990.
2001	Live In Marseille 2000	
2002	Mayhem – Cult of Aggression	Norwegian/Swedish documentary by Stefan Rydehed
2008	Pure Fucking Mayhem	English documentary by Stefan Rydehed

- A film, Lords of Chaos (based on the book of the same name), which focuses on Mayhem, premiered at the Sundance Film Festival in 2018. Mayhem gave permission to director Jonas Åkerlund to use their music.
