= DMDS =

DMDS may refer to:

- De Mysteriis Dom Sathanas, an album by the Norwegian black metal band Mayhem
- Dimethyl disulfide, a chemical compound
