= European Legions =

Compilation album by Mayhem
- Released: 2001
- Genres: Experimental metal; black metal
- Length: 46:21
- Label: Season of Mist
- Producer: Mayhem

Mayhem chronology
Grand Declaration of War (2000)	European Legions (2001)	Chimera (2004)

Professional ratings
Review scores
Source	Rating
Kerrang!	1/5 stars

European Legions is a compilation album by the Norwegian black metal band Mayhem. Tracks 1 to 7 are live tracks, and tracks 8 to 12 are pre-production tracks from the Grand Declaration of War sessions.

== Track listing ==
No songwriting credits exist in the liner notes. Credits taken from Lords of Chaos’s (2018) end credits and ASCAP.

All lyrics are written by Maniac, except where noted; all music by Blasphemer, except where noted.

No.	Title	Lyrics	Music	Length
1.	"Silvester Anfang / Fall of Seraphs"	(Instrumental) / Maniac	Conrad Schnitzler / Blasphemer	5:56
2.	"Carnage"	Necrobutcher	Necrobutcher	3:55
3.	"View from Nihil"			2:56
4.	"To Daimonion"			3:11
5.	"Freezing Moon"	Dead	Euronymous, Necrobutcher, Hellhammer	6:14
6.	"Chainsaw Gutsfuck"	Necrobutcher	Necrobutcher, Euronymous	5:14
7.	"Pure Fucking Armageddon"	Necrobutcher	Necrobutcher, Euronymous	1:25
8.	"To Daimonion" (Demo)			3:15
9.	"View from Nihil" (Demo)			2:58
10.	"In the Lies Where Upon You Lay" (Demo)			5:56
11.	"Crystallized Pain in Deconstruction" (Demo)			4:01
12.	"Completion In Science Of Agony" (Demo)			2:09

== Credits ==
- Maniac (Sven Erik Kristiansen) - vocals
- Blasphemer (Rune Eriksen) - guitar
- Necrobutcher (Jørn Stubberud) - bass guitar
- Hellhammer (Jan Axel Blomberg) - drums
