= Liturgy of Death =

Studio album by Mayhem
- Released: 6 February 2026
- Studio: NBS Studio, Sweden; SMB Studio and Chamber Studio
- Genre: Black metal
- Length: 48:54
- Label: Century Media
- Producer: Tore Stjerna

Mayhem chronology
Daemon (2019)	Liturgy of Death (2026)

Liturgy of Death is the seventh studio album by Norwegian black metal band Mayhem, released on 6 February 2026.

== Critical reception ==
Professional ratings
Review scores
Source	Rating
Beats Per Minute	75%
Kerrang!	4/5
Metal Hammer	4/5 stars
New Noise Magazine	3.5/5 stars
Sputnikmusic	3.2/5

Metal Hammer gave the album a 4/5, saying: "Much like 2019's Daemon and its underrated presecessor Esoteric Warfare, Liturgy of Death proudly presents another alternative take on the band's pioneering but endlessly malleable output. Kerrang! also gave it 4/5, stating: "Even though you could not call the songs 'lean' – half of the eight clock in at over seven minutes and none under five – there is a sense that not a moment's wasted, everything is exactly where it needs to be." Invisible Oranges described the album as being the closest Mayhem will ever come to a direct sequel to their debut album De Mysteriis Dom Sathanas.

== Track listing ==
All lyrics are written by Attila.

Liturgy of Death track listing
No.	Title	Music	Length
1.	"Ephemeral Eternity" (featuring Garm and Ulver)	Morten Bergeton Iversen	6:47
2.	"Despair"	Ghul	6:41
3.	"Weep for Nothing"	Iversen	7:04
4.	"Aeon's End"	Ghul	4:55
5.	"Funeral of Existence"	Iversen	5:57
6.	"Realm of Endless Misery"	Iversen	4:58
7.	"Propitious Death"	Ghul	5:05
8.	"The Sentence of Absolution"	Iversen	7:28
Total length:			48:55

Limited edition CD bonus tracks
No.	Title	Length
9.	"Life Is a Corpse You Drag"	5:22
10.	"Sancta Mendacia"

== Personnel ==
Credits adapted from Tidal.

=== Mayhem ===
- Jan Axel Blomberg – drums
- Attila Csihar – lead vocals
- Charles Hedger – guitar
- Morten Bergeton Iversen – guitar
- Jørn Stubberud – bass guitar

=== Additional contributors ===
- Tore Stjerna – production, mixing, engineering
- Thomas Johansson – mastering
- Garm – background vocals on "Ephemeral Eternity"
- Daniel Valeriani – artwork

== Charts ==
Chart performance for Liturgy of Death
Chart (2026)	Peak position
Austrian Albums (Ö3 Austria)	3
Belgian Albums (Ultratop Flanders)	18
Belgian Albums (Ultratop Wallonia)	19
Finnish Albums (Suomen virallinen lista)	10
French Albums (SNEP)	118
French Rock & Metal Albums (SNEP)	4
German Albums (Offizielle Top 100)	7
German Rock & Metal Albums (Offizielle Top 100)	3
Greek Albums (IFPI)	51
Hungarian Physical Albums (MAHASZ)	15
Japanese Western Albums (Oricon)	29
Norwegian Albums (IFPI Norge)	34
Polish Albums (ZPAV)	26
Scottish Albums (OCC)	51
Swedish Hard Rock Albums (Sverigetopplistan)	4
Swedish Physical Albums (Sverigetopplistan)	4
Swiss Albums (Schweizer Hitparade)	10
UK Albums Sales (OCC)	46
UK Rock & Metal Albums (OCC)	7
US Top Current Album Sales (Billboard)	39
