= Corpse paint =

Type of black and white body painting

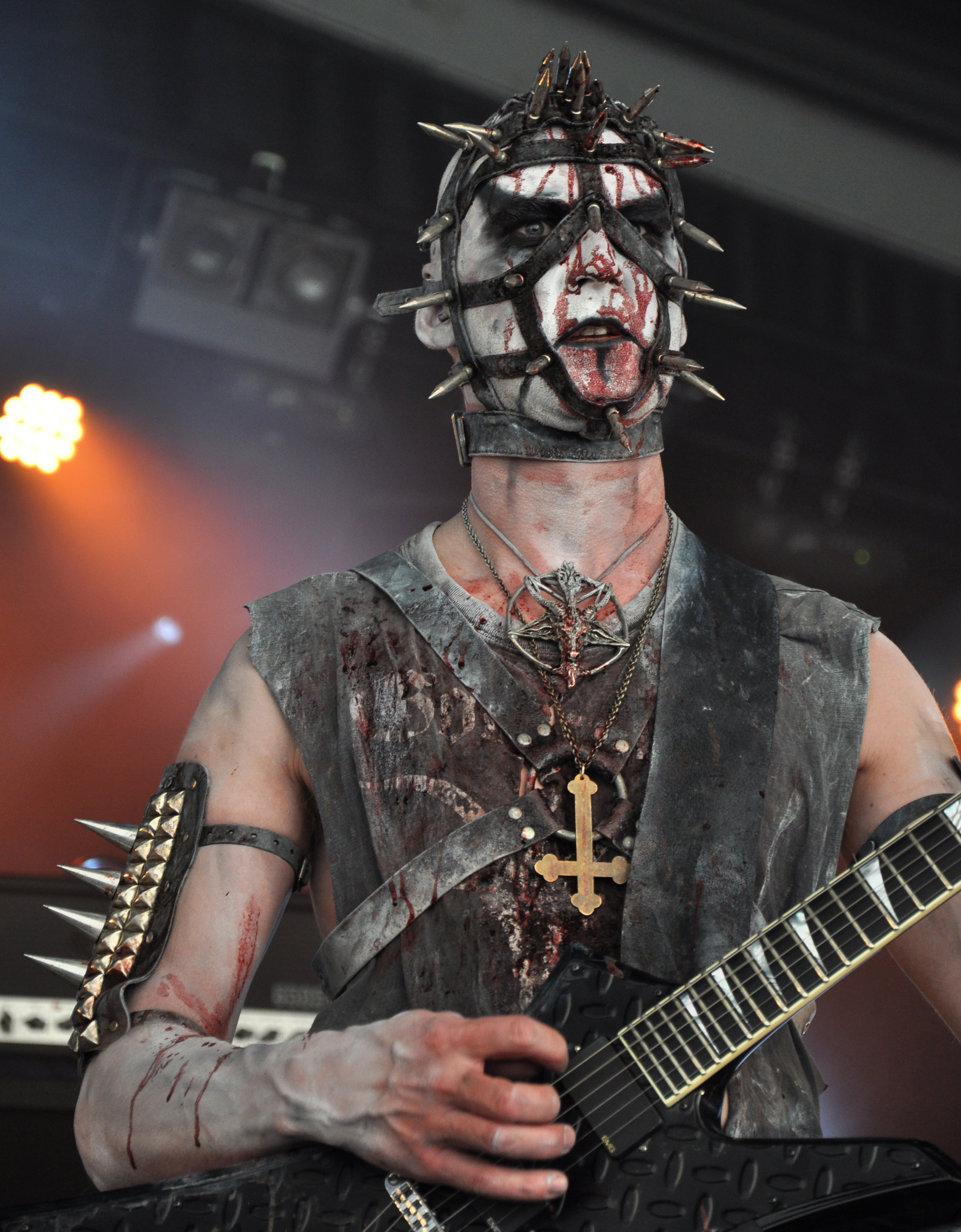
Enzifer of Urgehal wearing corpse paint with the spiked armbands and inverted crosses commonly worn by black metal musicians

Corpse paint is a style of body painting, used mainly by black metal bands for concerts and band photos. The body painting is used to make the musicians appear inhuman, corpse-like, or demonic, and is perhaps "the most identifiable aspect of the black metal aesthetic."

Corpse paint typically involves making the face and neck white (or pale), sometimes with red marks to signify blood or laceration, and making the area around the eyes and mouth black. Musicians will often have a trademark style. Other colors are seldom used, yet there are notable exceptions, such as Attila Csihar's use of neon colors and the bands Satyricon and Dødheimsgard experimenting with color as well.

Outside of black metal, black and white face painting has been used by a variety of other musicians such as Lou Reed as well as shock rock artists Arthur Brown and Alice Cooper alongside members of Kiss and the Misfits. Corpse paint has also been adopted by professional wrestlers (e.g. Sting and Vampiro), as well as for the normal beautification or ornamentation denoted by cosmetics.

== History and usage ==
The earliest rock groups to wear body painting similar to corpse paint included Screamin' Jay Hawkins, Screaming Lord Sutch and Arthur Brown in the 1960s. In the 1970s, examples of black and white face paint by rock & roll performers included Secos & Molhados, Alice Cooper, Klaus Nomi, Lou Reed and Kiss. Guitarist Zal Cleminson of the Sensational Alex Harvey Band wore face paint and colorful clothes, performing in a menacing demeanor that evoked the evil clown trope. Later that decade, punk rock acts like the Misfits and singer David Vanian of The Damned also used black and white face paint. On seeing shock rock pioneer Arthur Brown performing his US number two hit "Fire" in 1968, Alice Cooper states, "Can you imagine the young Alice Cooper watching that with all his make-up and hellish performance? It was like all my Halloweens came at once!"

In the late 1970s and '80s, such face paint began to be more associated with metal performers. Vocalist King Diamond of Mercyful Fate used face paint similar to corpse paint as early as 1978 in his band Black Rose, while Hellhammer and their later incarnation as Celtic Frost also wore similar face paint. Per "Dead" Ohlin was the first to explicitly associate stylized face paint with an attempt to look like a corpse according to drummer Jan Axel "Hellhammer" Blomberg of Mayhem. Brazilian band Sarcófago also pioneered the look, being dubbed by Metal Storm magazine as the first band with "true" corpse paint. However, Necrobutcher insists that his band Mayhem was the first to use corpse paint and credits the band's singer Per "Dead" Ohlin with coining the term. Early corpse paint was meant simply to highlight an individual's features and make them look "dead."

Bands of the early Norwegian black metal scene used corpse paint extensively. Early vocalist of Mayhem Per "Dead" Ohlin started wearing it in the late 1980s. According to Necrobutcher, Mayhem's bass player: "It wasn't anything to do with the way Kiss and Alice Cooper used makeup. Dead actually wanted to look like a corpse. He didn't do it to look cool." In the early 1990s, other Norwegian black metal bands followed suit and their style and sound was adopted by bands around the world. Eventually, some Norwegian bands—such as Emperor and Satyricon—stopped wearing corpse paint, often citing its loss of individualistic meaning, as well as its increased trendiness, due to use by so many bands.

== Examples ==
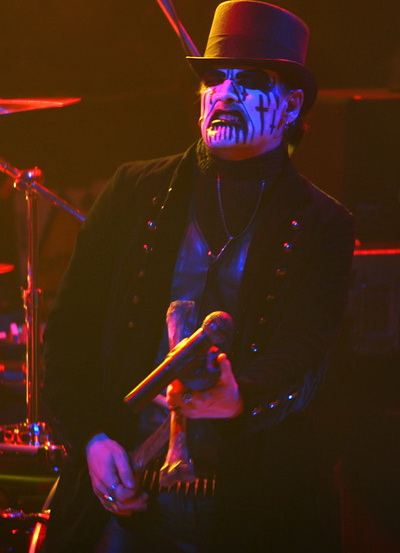
King Diamond of Mercyful Fate and King Diamond

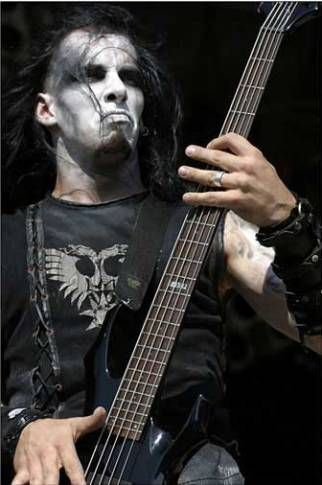
Orion of Behemoth

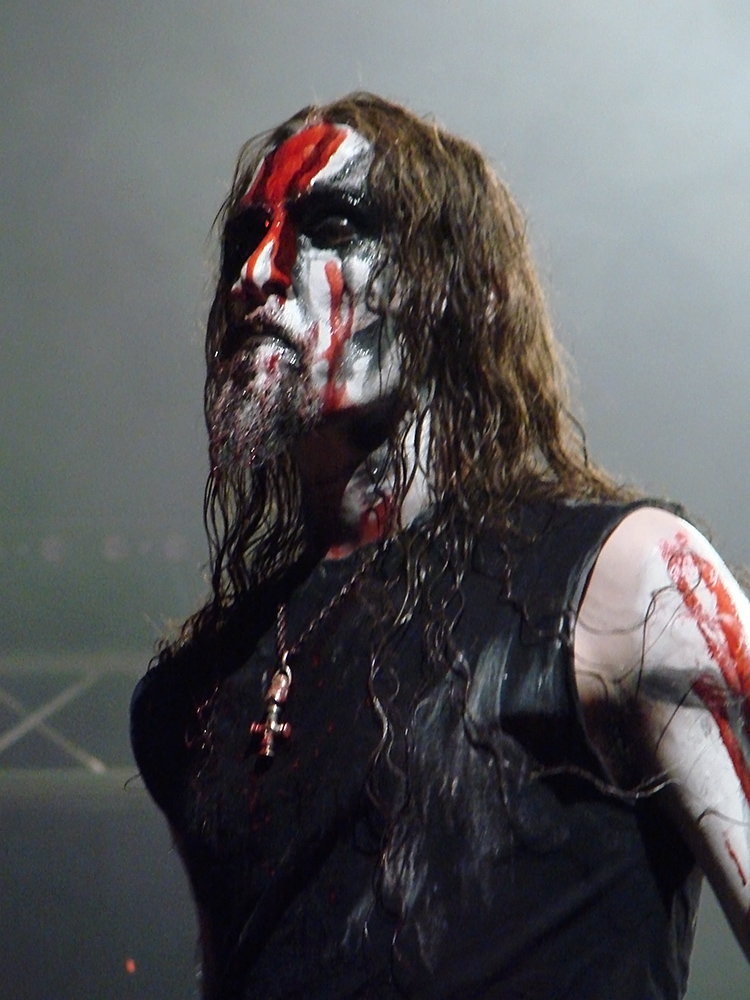
Gaahl with God Seed

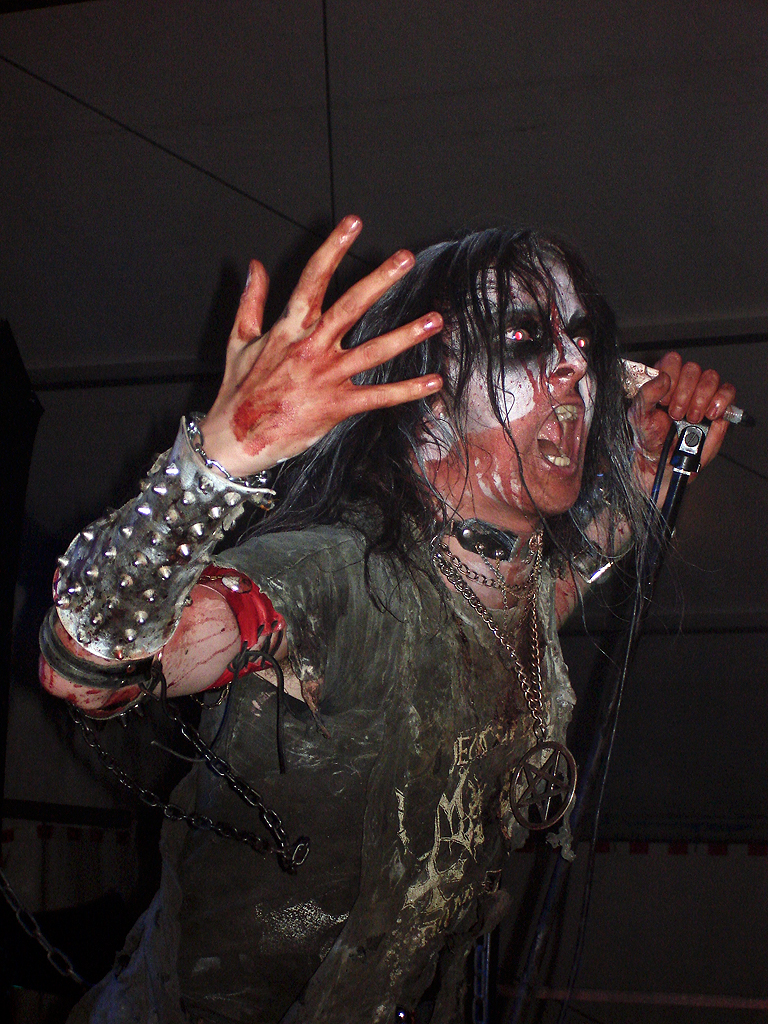
Erik Danielsson of Watain

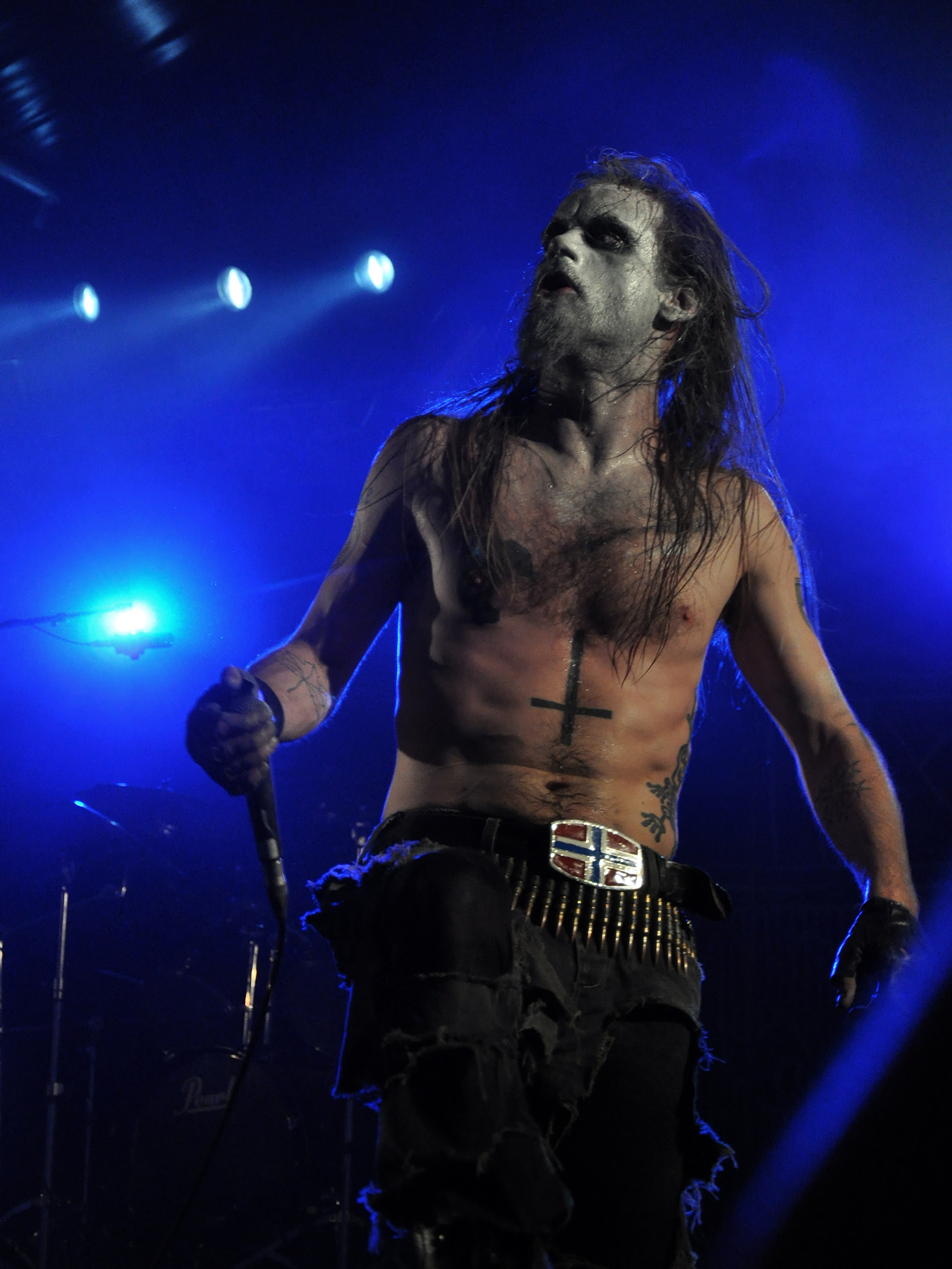
Hoest of Taake

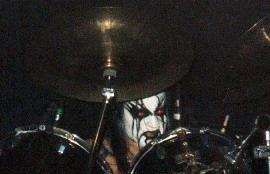
Frost of Satyricon and 1349

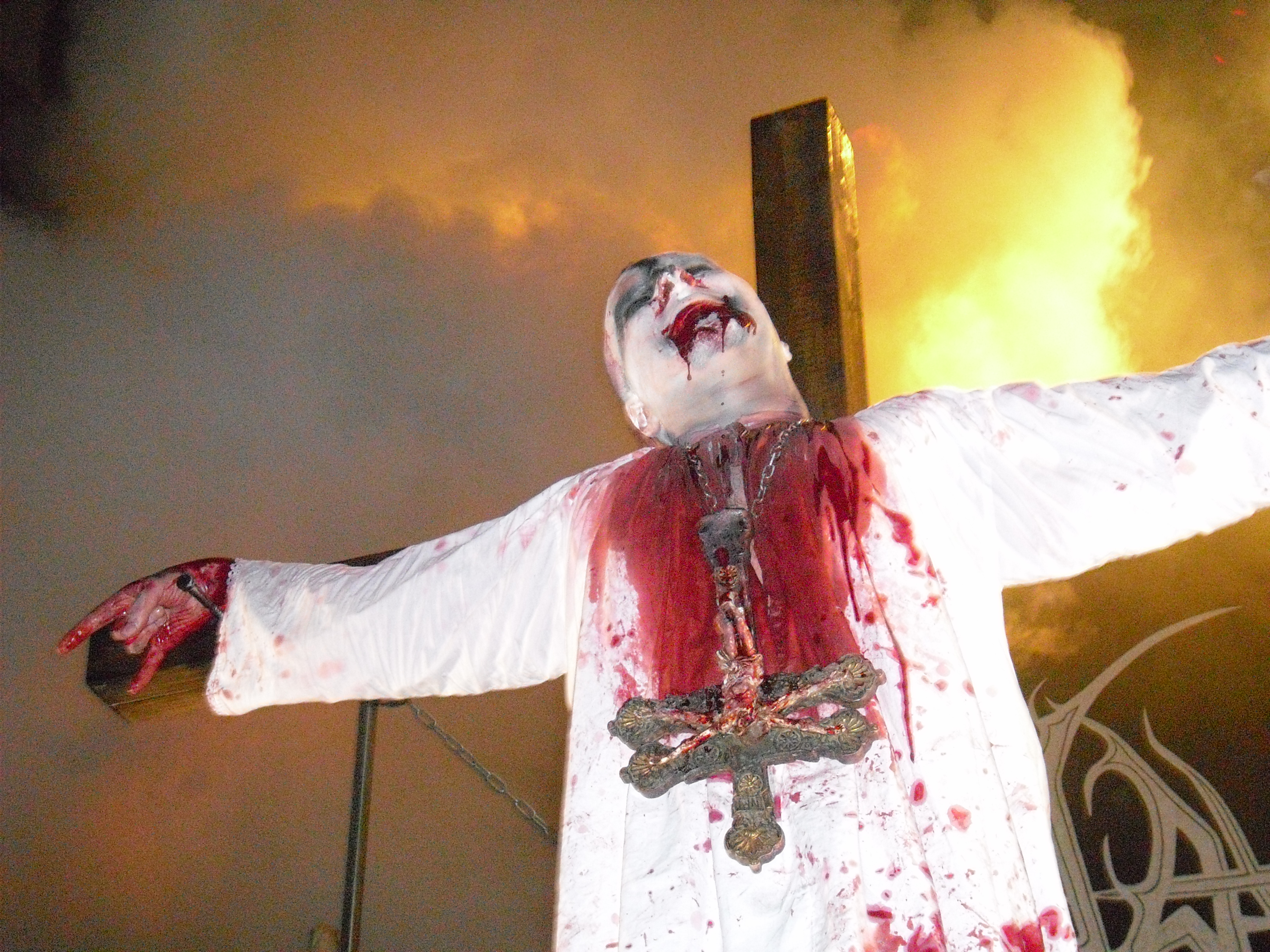
Attila Csihar performing with Mayhem

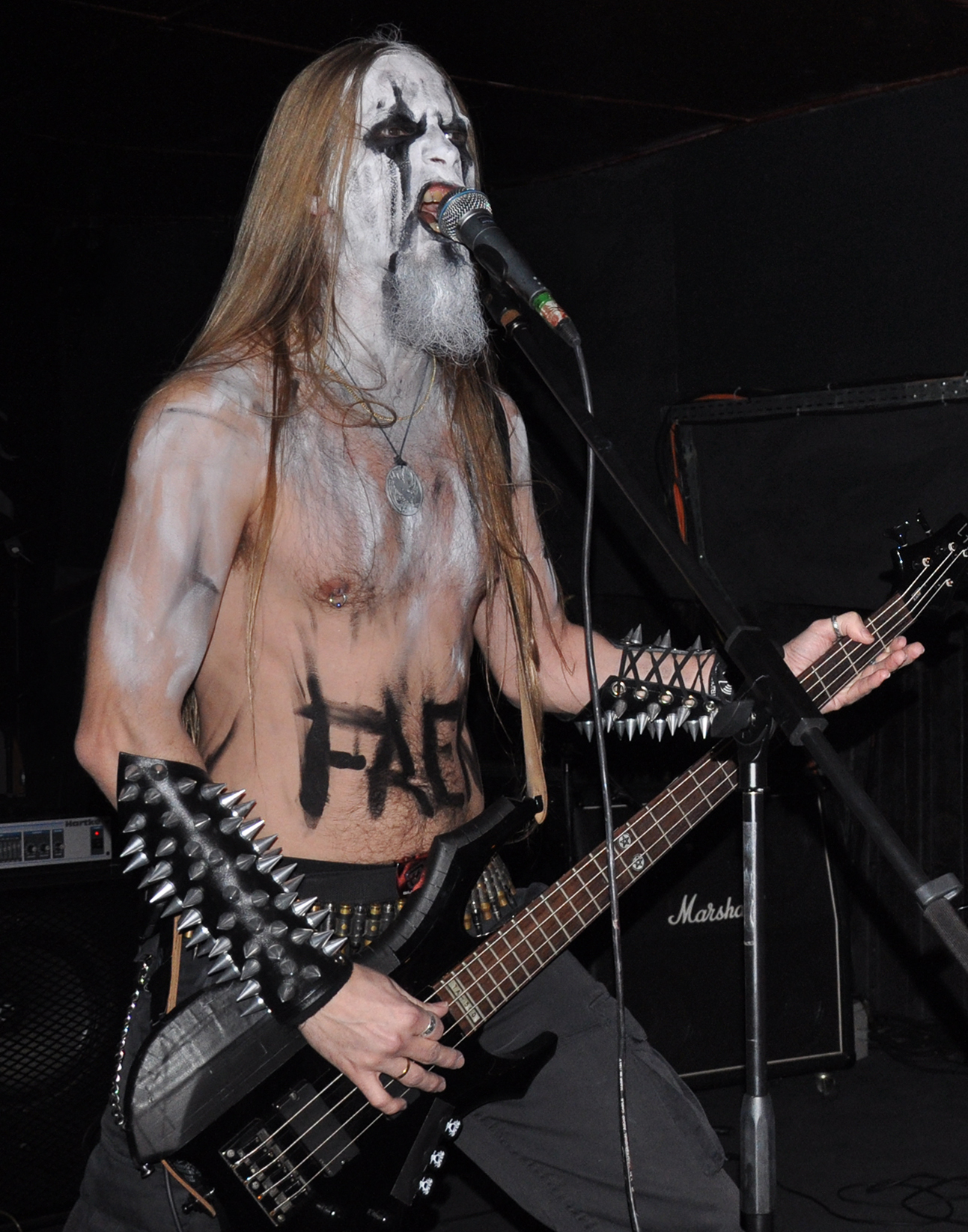
Nag of Tsjuder

== See also ==
- Heavy metal fashion
