= Skitliv =

Norwegian black-doom band

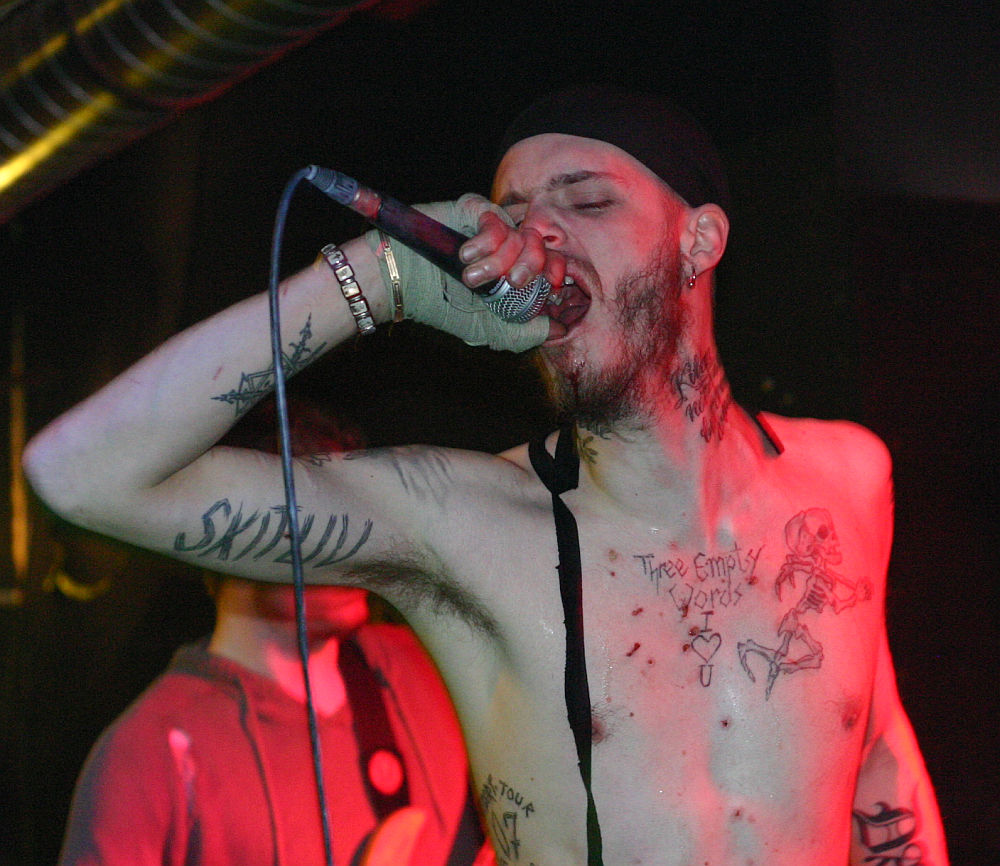
- Kvarforth during a gig in Escape-Metalcorner, Vienna, Austria (2007)

Background information
- Origin: Oslo, Norway
- Genres: Black metal, doom metal
- Years active: 2005–present
- Labels: Season of Mist
- Members: Sven Erik "Maniac" Kristiansen; Niklas Kvarforth; Ted Wedebrand; Renè M. "Spacebrain" Hamel; Ingvar Magnusson

Skitliv (Norwegian and Swedish for "shit life") is a Norwegian black-doom metal band founded in 2005 by former Mayhem vocalist Maniac and Shining vocalist Niklas Kvarforth. Maniac describes the project as "firmly rooted in black metal" but much darker and more brooding than anything he has done before.

== Members ==
- Sven Erik "Maniac" Kristiansen – vocals, guitar
- Niklas Kvarforth – guitar
- Dag Otto – drums
- Ingvar Magnusson – guitar

== Discography ==
- Kristiansen and Kvarforth Swim in the Sea of Equalibrium While Waiting... (demo, 2007)
- Amfetamin (MCD) (2008)
- Skandinavisk misantropi (2009)
