= Ordo Ad Chao =

Studio album by Mayhem
- Released: 23 April 2007
- Recorded: 13 November – 4 December 2006
- Studios: Mølla Studio, Gjerstad, Norway
- Genre: Black metal
- Length: 40:46
- Label: Season of Mist
- Producers: Blasphemer; Attila

Mayhem chronology
Chimera (2004)	Ordo Ad Chao (2007)	Esoteric Warfare (2014)

Professional ratings
Review scores
Source	Rating
About.com	4/5 stars
Chronicles of Chaos	8/10
Metal Storm	9.0/10.0
PopMatters	5/10
The Observer	4/5 stars
Sputnikmusic	4.0/5

Ordo Ad Chao is the fourth studio album by the Norwegian black metal band Mayhem. The album received the Spellemann Award for best heavy metal album on 2 February 2008.

In 2013, Decibel ranked Ordo Ad Chao at number 97 on its list of the Top 100 Black Metal Albums of All Time.

== Background ==
Ordo Ad Chao is the first album to feature vocalist Attila Csihar since the 1994 debut De Mysteriis Dom Sathanas and the last with Blasphemer before he announced his departure from the band in 2008.

Ordo Ad Chao was released on 23 April 2007. It charted at #12 in Norway, making it the band's highest-charting album yet. There is a version of the album supplied in a metal case that is limited to a production of 3,000.

== Music style and songwriting ==
Drummer, Hellhammer said that the drum tracks were not equalized and only the bass drums were triggered. He concluded "the production sounds necro as fuck, but that's the way we wanted it – this time. It represents Mayhem today." Indeed, the sound of the album is much rawer than that of any official Mayhem studio release since Deathcrush, with a very bass-heavy mix. Despite that, the album continues the somewhat unorthodox songwriting approach showcased on the band's last two releases, with "Illuminate Eliminate" being the band's second longest song. Despite being a black metal album, it has some death metal influences including the use of death grunt vocals.

== Track listing ==
All lyrics are written by Attila except "Anti", which is by both Atilla and Blasphemer; all music is composed by Blasphemer.

No.	Title	Length
1.	"A Wise Birthgiver"	3:30
2.	"Wall of Water"	4:40
3.	"Great Work of Ages"	3:52
4.	"Deconsecrate"	4:07
5.	"Illuminate Eliminate"	9:40
6.	"Psychic Horns"	6:32
7.	"Key to the Storms"	3:52
8.	"Anti"	4:33
Total length:		40:46

== Personnel ==
Mayhem

- Attila Csihar – vocals, producer, mastering
- Blasphemer – guitar, bass guitar, backing vocals
- Hellhammer – drums
- Necrobutcher – bass guitar

Additional personnel

- Knut Valle – engineer, mixing
- Kim Sølve, Trine Paulsen – artwork, photography

== Charts ==
Chart (2007)	Peak position
Swedish Albums (Sverigetopplistan)	57
Norwegian Albums (VG-lista)	12
