= Wolf's Lair Abyss =

EP by Mayhem
- Released: 3 November 1997
- Genre: Black metal
- Length: 24:41
- Label: Misanthropy
- Producer: Kristoffer Rygg

Mayhem chronology
| Out from the Dark (1996) | Wolf's Lair Abyss (1997) | Mediolanum Capta Est (1999) |

Professional ratings
Review scores
| Source | Rating |
|---|---|
| Allmusic | 3/5 stars |
| Kerrang! | 3/5 stars |

Wolf's Lair Abyss is an EP by the Norwegian black metal band Mayhem.

According to the band's website, it is the first part of Grand Declaration of War. The main riff of the last track, "Symbols of Bloodswords", is used in "A Grand Declaration of War" and "View from Nihil (Part II)".

This EP was the first Mayhem release without guitarist Euronymous, who was murdered in 1993. The new line-up's material displayed across the songs is notably far more technical than that of earlier incarnations of the band; apart from the intro, each track contains at least two separate sections and is played at high tempo with consistent blast beats.

== Track listing ==
| No. | Title | Length |
|---|---|---|
| 1. | "The Vortex Void of Inhumanity (Intro)" | 2:21 |
| 2. | "I Am the Labyrinth" | 5:26 |
| 3. | "Fall of Serephs" | 6:02 |
| 4. | "Ancient Skin" | 5:28 |
| 5. | "Symbols of Bloodswords" | 5:24 |
| Total length: | | 24:41 |

Expanded edition:

| No. | Title | Length |
|---|---|---|
| 6. | "Ancient Skin(May 1997 Recording)" | 5:00 |
| 7. | "Necrolust(May 1997 Recording)" | 3:31 |
| Total length: | | 33:12 |

== Personnel ==
Mayhem

- Sven Erik Kristiansen (Maniac) - vocals
- Rune Eriksen (Blasphemer) - guitar
- Jørn Stubberud (Necrobutcher) - bass guitar
- Jan Axel Blomberg (Hellhammer) - drums

Production

- Produced by Kristoffer Rygg
- Engineered, mixed and mastered by Mayhem
- Recorded at Studio Studio Nyhagen

== See also ==
- Mayhem discography
