= Deathcrush =

EP by Mayhem
- Released: August 1987
- Recorded: February–March 1987
- Studios: Creative, Kolbotn, Norway
- Genre: Black metal
- Length: 17:28
- Label: Posercorpse
- Producers: Mayhem; Erik Avnskog

Mayhem chronology
| Deathcrush (1987) | Live in Leipzig (1993) |

Deathcrush is the debut EP and overall first commercial release by Norwegian black metal band Mayhem. It was released in August 1987 by Posercorpse Music.

== Background ==
Though influential to black metal, its lyrics and sound were largely influenced by thrash metal bands. After vocalist Dead joined the group, the band adopted darker lyrical topics and guitarist Euronymous (Øystein Aarseth) started rejecting most other metal bands as their lyrics turned towards "social awareness" and "normal" topics instead of death worship; he "wanted things to be more serious and extreme". Dead stated that the lyrics "aren't bad at all, but they are later what would become gore and trendy".

The opening track "Silvester Anfang" was provided to the band by German electronic music composer Conrad Schnitzler, after Euronymous found Schnitzler's home address and sat outside his house until he was eventually invited in. Euronymous then asked Schnitzler to compose an intro for the album; rather than record a new composition Schnitzler gave Euronymous a random piece from his archives, which would later become known as "Silvester Anfang".

Drummer Kjetil Manheim later stated that the band's sound was "something that [the studio technician] did not know how to record (...) so he just set the settings and we recorded". He also noted that there was "no mix, before or after" and "no overdubs: bass, drums, guitar are live and then we recorded the vocals after".

In 2008, Daniel Ekeroth wrote, "The two visionaries [Aarseth and Per 'Dead' Ohlin] pushed each other further into darkness, and sometime in 1990 they finally adopted the Satanic image that would become so crucial for the genre [...] It's well documented that Øystein initially was very into death metal and grindcore".

According to Dead, most, but not all of the lyrics were written by bassist Necrobutcher.

Maniac performed vocals on all of the tracks except "Pure Fucking Armageddon", which was sung by Messiah. The Venom cover "Witching Hour" was sung by Messiah and Maniac. Manheim played piano on "(Weird) Manheim".

== Reception and legacy ==
Professional ratings
Review scores
| Source | Rating |
|---|---|
| AllMusic | 2.5/5 stars |
| Kerrang! | 4/5 stars |

Despite its limited print run, the mini-album appeared in the top 20 on Kerrang! magazine's album charts. In 2001, Q named it one of the "50 Heaviest Albums of All Time".

"Chainsaw Gutsfuck" was voted "Most Gruesome Lyrics Ever" by Blender in 2006.

== Track listing ==
No credits exist in liner notes. Credit for Tracks 2 and 7 according to Lords of Chaos (2018) end credits; credits for tracks 3 and 5 taken from ASCAP. Tracks 1 and 4 are cover songs.

| No. | Title | Writer(s) | Length |
|---|---|---|---|
| 1. | "Silvester Anfang" (instrumental) | Conrad Schnitzler | 1:56 |
| 2. | "Deathcrush" | Jørn Stubberud, Øystein Aerseth | 3:33 |
| 3. | "Chainsaw Gutsfuck" | Stubberud, Aerseth | 3:33 |
| 4. | "Witching Hour" (Venom cover) | Conrad Lant, Jeffrey Dunn, Tony Bray | 1:49 |
| 5. | "Necrolust" | Stubberud, Aerseth | 3:37 |
| 6. | "(Weird) Manheim" (instrumental) | | 0:48 |
| 7. | "Pure Fucking Armageddon" | Stubberud, Aerseth | 2:09 |
| Total length: | | | 17:28 |

LP Bonus track

| No. | Title | Length |
|---|---|---|
| 8. | Untitled | 1:09 |
| Total length: | | 18:34 |

Note: Some versions have "(Weird) Manheim" and "Pure Fucking Armageddon" on the same track.

== Personnel ==
=== Mayhem ===
- Maniac – lead vocals
- Euronymous – guitar, vocals on track 8
- Necrobutcher – bass, vocals on track 8
- Manheim – drums, piano on track 6, vocals track 8

=== Session members ===
- Messiah (Eirik Skyseth Norheim) – "Iron Lungs (session)" (lead vocals on track 7; co-lead vocals on track 4 and 8)
- Conrad Schnitzler – drums, percussion and electronic instruments on track 1
