= Chimera (Mayhem album) =

Studio album by Mayhem
- Released: 29 March 2004
- Recorded: November 2003 – January 2004
- Genre: Black metal
- Length: 44:31
- Label: Season of Mist
- Producer: Blasphemer

Mayhem chronology
European Legions (2001)	Chimera (2004)	Ordo Ad Chao (2007)

Professional ratings
Review scores
Source	Rating
Allmusic	3/5 stars
Kerrang!	4/5 stars

Chimera is the third studio album by the Norwegian black metal band Mayhem. It is the second and final studio album with the vocalist Sven Erik Kristiansen (Maniac) before he departed Mayhem. TurboNatas of the Norwegian band Red Harvest provided the album artwork. The cover image is a still from the 1922 Swedish silent film Häxan.

== Track listing ==
All tracks are written by Maniac & Blasphemer.

No.	Title	Length
1.	"Whore"	2:58
2.	"Dark Night of the Soul"	6:08
3.	"Rape Humanity with Pride"	5:41
4.	"My Death"	5:54
5.	"You Must Fall"	4:13
6.	"Slaughter of Dreams"	7:00
7.	"Impious Devious Leper Lord"	5:38
8.	"Chimera"	7:00
Total length:		44:31

== Personnel ==
Mayhem

- Maniac – vocals
- Blasphemer – guitar
- Necrobutcher – bass
- Hellhammer – drums

Production

- Produced by Blasphemer
- Engineered by Borge Finstad
- Mixed by Blasphemer, Hellhammer and Borge Finstad
- Mastered by Morten Lund

== Charts ==
Chart (2004)	Peak position
Norwegian Albums Chart	28
