= Live in Leipzig =

Live album by Mayhem
- Released: 1993
- Recorded: 26 November 1990
- Venue: Eiskeller (Leipzig)
- Genre: Black metal
- Length: 46:51
- Label: Obscure Plasma
- Producer: Mayhem

Mayhem chronology
Deathcrush (1987)	Live in Leipzig (1993)	De Mysteriis Dom Sathanas (1994)

Live in Leipzig is a live album by the Norwegian black metal band Mayhem. It was recorded at the Eiskeller club in Leipzig, Germany on 26 November 1990 but not released until 1993. The songs performed during the concert were from the Pure Fucking Armageddon demo (1986), the Deathcrush EP (1987) and the as-yet-unrecorded album De Mysteriis Dom Sathanas (1994). It is one of the band's few official releases with Dead as vocalist, albeit posthumous.

== Reception ==
Professional ratings
Review scores
Source	Rating
AllMusic	3/5 stars

AllMusic critic Steve Huey wrote, "With a shortage of official Mayhem material featuring this [classic] lineup, it's a necessary item for devoted fans, even in spite of the less-than-ideal sound quality."

German magazine Rock Hard included it in the list "250 Black-Metal-Alben, die man kennen sollte" ("250 Black Metal Albums You Should Know").

Andrew O'Neill wrote in their book A History of Heavy Metal that Live in Leipzig can be seen as the black metal equivalent of The Who's Live at Leeds.

In 2013, Decibel ranked Live in Leipzig at number 15 on its list of the Top 100 Black Metal Albums of All Time.

== Re-releases ==
In 2015, Peaceville Records re-released Live in Leipzig to mark the 25th anniversary of the performance. This release also included Mayhem's performance at Bergisdorf near Zeitz, which was part of the same tour, as well as a concert in Annaberg-Buchholz. The performance in Bergisdorf was later released as an album on its own, Live in Zeitz.

== Track listing ==
Songwriting credits according to Lords of Chaos (2018) end credits and ASCAP.

No.	Title	Writer(s)	Length
1.	"Deathcrush"	Jørn Stubberud, Øystein Aerseth	4:37
2.	"Necrolust"	Stubberud, Aerseth	3:46
3.	"Funeral Fog"	Stubberud, Aerseth, Per Yngve Ohlin	6:31
4.	"The Freezing Moon"	Ohlin, Aerseth, Stubberud, Jan Axel Blomberg	7:05
5.	"Carnage"	Stubberud	4:06
6.	"Buried by Time and Dust"		5:29
7.	"Pagan Fears"	Ohlin, Aerseth, Stubberud, Blomberg	7:00
8.	"Chainsaw Gutsfuck"	Stubberud, Aerseth	5:07
9.	"Pure Fucking Armageddon"	Stubberud, Aerseth	3:10
Total length:			46:51

== Personnel ==
- Dead (Per Yngve Ohlin) – vocals
- Euronymous (Øystein Aarseth) – guitar
- Necrobutcher (Jørn Stubberud) – bass guitar
- Hellhammer (Jan Axel Blomberg) – drums
