= Necrobutcher =

Norwegian bassist (born 1968)

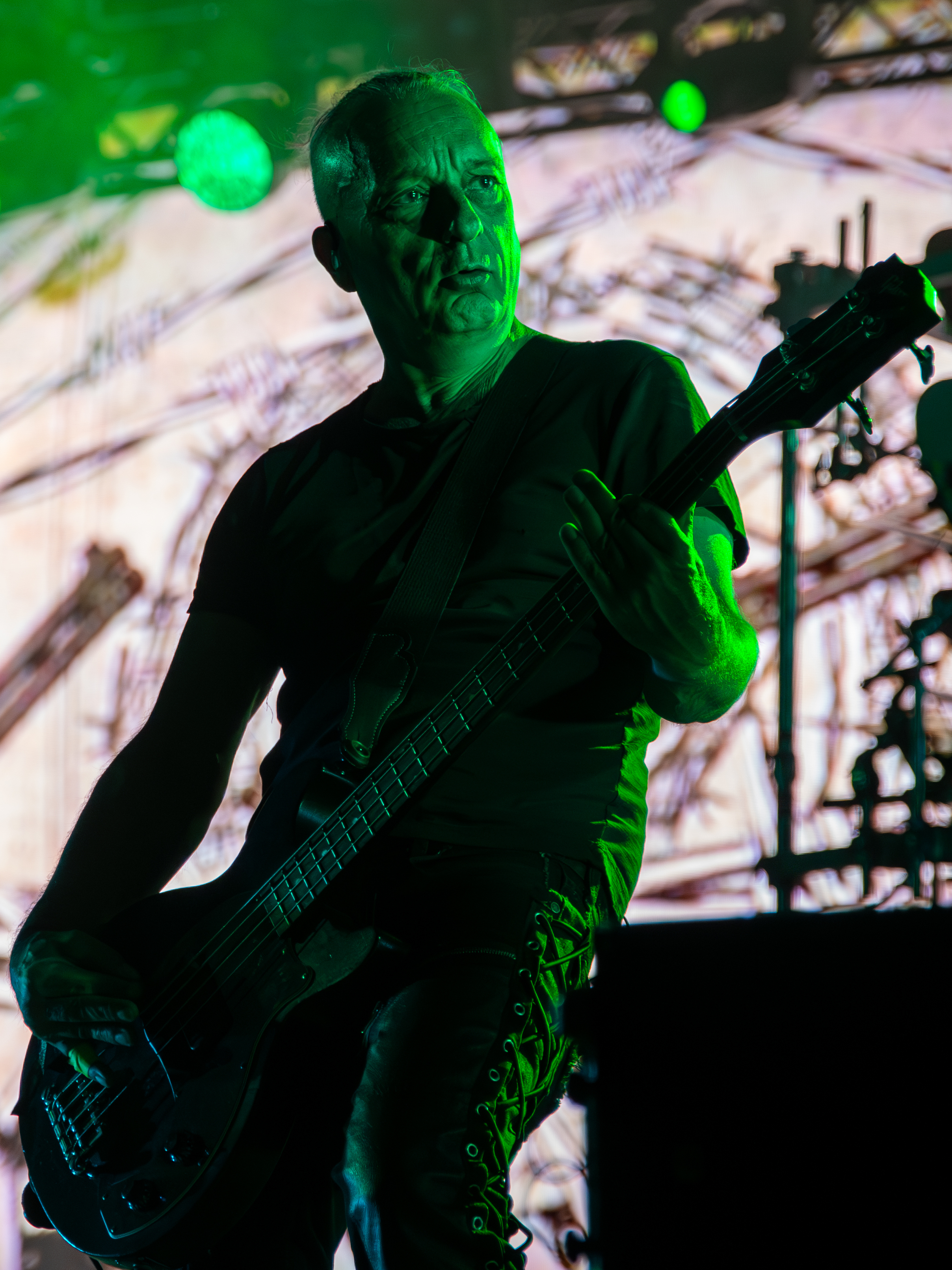
- Necrobutcher in 2024

Background information
- Born: Jørn Stubberud; 13 April 1968 (age 58); Norway
- Genres: Black metal, death metal, thrash metal
- Occupation: Bassist
- Years active: 1984–present
- Member of: Mayhem

Jørn Stubberud (born 13 April 1968) is a Norwegian musician best known as the bassist in the black metal band Mayhem under the stage name Necrobutcher. He is one of Mayhem's founding members, along with Euronymous and Manheim. He is the band's only remaining original member, as Manheim left Mayhem in 1988, and Euronymous was murdered in 1993. He has also played in other bands, including L.E.G.O., Kvikksølvguttene, Bloodthorn (guest artist), and Checker Patrol.

== Musical career ==
A tragic thing happened to my band — one of my best friends [Dead] killed himself. As I’m trying to cope with this, Euronymous tells me that he has taken photos of his dead body. I got very upset by this and I told him, ‘I’m going to beat you up, I’m going to kill you. Burn the photos before you even talk to me again.’ [Euronymous] didn’t give me any room to grieve. I was very mad at him, so when he was killed — he was my best friend for 10 years — I never cried over his death. Actually, I thought maybe the cops would think it was me who did it, because I had plans to kill him myself.

— Necrobutcher on Euronymous, as quoted by Graham Hartmann of Loudwire (October 16, 2019)

Necrobutcher was in the band since 1984, but left in 1991 because of personal concerns following the suicide of former vocalist Dead as well as internal conflicts and disagreement with bandmate Euronymous. He was replaced as a session bassist by Varg Vikernes, who murdered Euronymous in 1993. In 1995, Necrobutcher reformed the band, along with Hellhammer, Maniac and Blasphemer. He still plays in Mayhem.

In 2018, he released his retrospective book about the early stages of the band, The Death Archives: Mayhem 1984–94, published by Thurston Moore's publishing house Ecstatic Peace Library.

During promotional interviews for the 2018's Daemon, Necrobutcher claimed he was "On [his] way to kill Euronymous but Varg beat [him] to it", and also claimed that the Norwegian Police were aware of Vikernes' plot to kill Euronymous, stating: "But little did I know that the Norwegian police already knew that Count Grishnackh [Varg] was going down also to kill him. Because they bugged his phone, and he actually talked about this killing before he went to Bergen so the cops already knew that he was coming, so they probably were thinking to themselves, 'We didn't nail this guy for the church burnings, so let's nail him for murder, and get rid of this f–king guy in Oslo the same time.' So that's basically what happened."

In 2019, he claimed that while he had intended to kill Euronymous, he had a change of heart after visiting him at his apartment several weeks before the murder actually took place. He recalled: "I’m such a fucking softy. He started to call me, and was like, I need to come to see him. In the end, I came to his apartment, listened to the Mysteriis album and he wanted to know if I wanted to return to the band. At that time, I thought maybe he’d thrown the photos away, because I never saw any, up until then. Two or three weeks later, he was killed."

== Personal life ==
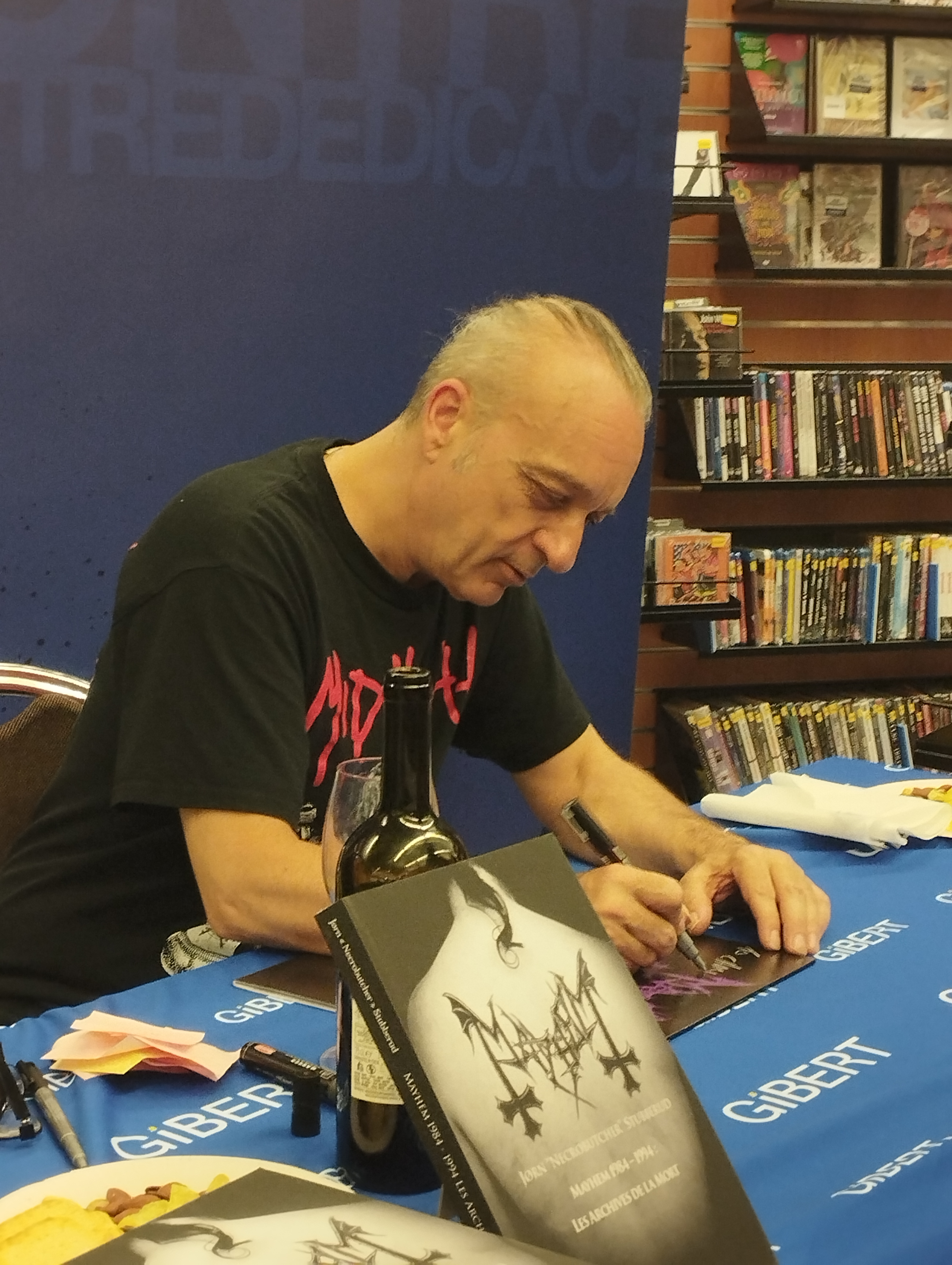
Stubberud signing autographs in 2022

Necrobutcher is an atheist. He has a daughter and a grandson.

Known for playing and representing black metal music for most of his career, he enjoys listening to mainstream bands like The Cult, Talking Heads, Depeche Mode, Beastie Boys, The Police, Ministry, INXS, and The Rolling Stones.

== Discography ==
=== Albums ===
- De Mysteriis Dom Sathanas (1994) (Songwriting)
- Grand Declaration of War (2000)
- Chimera (2004)
- Ordo ad Chao (2007)
- Esoteric Warfare (2014)
- Daemon (2019)
- Liturgy of Death (2026)

=== EPs ===
- Deathcrush (1987)
- Wolf's Lair Abyss (1997)
- Life Eternal (2008) (Songwriting)
- Atavistic Black Disorder / Kommando (2021)

=== Live albums ===
- Live in Leipzig (1993)
- The Dawn of the Black Hearts (1995)
- Mediolanum Capta Est (1999)
- Live in Marseille (2001)
- Live in Zeitz (2016)
- De Mysteriis Dom Sathanas Alive (2016)
- Live in Jessheim (2017)
- Live in Sarpsborg (2019)
