= Sven Erik Kristiansen =

Norwegian vocalist (born 1969)

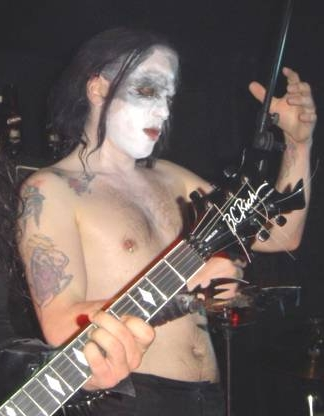
- Maniac live with Mayhem in 2004

Background information
- Also known as: Maniac
- Born: 4 February 1969 (age 57)
- Origin: Norway
- Genres: Black metal, doom metal, hardcore punk, noise, dark ambient
- Occupation: Singer
- Years active: 1986–present
- Member of: Skitliv
- Formerly of: Mayhem

Sven Erik Kristiansen (born 4 February 1969) is a Norwegian musician, best known as the former vocalist in the black metal band Mayhem under the stage name Maniac.

Loudwire called Kristiansen "an incarnation of authenticity."

== Career ==
Kristiansen joined Mayhem in 1986 after the departure of the band's original vocalist Messiah, and left in 1987. He was then replaced by Kittil, who was later replaced by Dead, who committed suicide in April 1991. When Hellhammer decided to revive Mayhem in 1994 after the deaths of both Euronymous and Dead, and the imprisonment of Count Grishnakh, he invited Kristiansen to return as the band's vocalist.

Kristiansen left Mayhem in 2004 through mutual consent due to his drinking problem and lack of time off. In 2016, Kristiansen briefly rejoined Mayhem onstage during a performance at the Inferno Festival in Oslo.

== Artistry ==
According to Loudwire, Kristiansen's vocal stylings alternate between what can be described as "inhuman vocalizations," and simply spoken word patterns. According to the site, his showmanship as a black metal frontman is characterized by "intellectualism and the ability to musically convey the nuances of insanity." Kristiansen was known for giving extremely intense live performances, often cutting himself onstage and frequently landing in intensive care units. However, in a later interview he stated when the band realized that the cutting had become a phenomenon people came to watch, he quit doing it.

== Personal life ==
Kristiansen has three children: a daughter with his wife, Eri Isaka (Vivian Slaughter of Gallhammer), a son with his ex-girlfriend, Hilma Nikolaisen, and a daughter from a previous relationship. He has stated that since he became a father, he has become more conscious of what he exposes himself to and is less destructive.

Kristiansen is a self-admitted alcoholic. According to him, the turning point for becoming sober was finding himself hanging by one arm out of a fourth floor window with no recollection of how he got there.

== Discography ==
=== With Mayhem ===
Studio albums

- Grand Declaration of War (2000)
- Chimera (2004)

Studio EPs

- Deathcrush (1987)
- Wolf's Lair Abyss (1997)

Live albums

- Mediolanum Capta Est (1999)
- Live In Marseille (2001)

Compilation albums

- European Legions (2001)

=== With Skitliv ===
Studio albums

- Skandinavisk misantropi (2009)

Studio EPs

- Amfetamin (MCD) (2008)
