= Esoteric Warfare =

Studio album by Mayhem
- Released: 6 June 2014 (Europe and Asia); 10 June 2014 (North America)
- Recorded: September–October 2013
- Studio: Mølla Studio, Gjerstad; SleikBallaMi, Oslo
- Genre: Black metal
- Length: 47:25
- Label: Season of Mist
- Producer: Teloch; Attila

Mayhem chronology
Ordo Ad Chao (2007)	Esoteric Warfare (2014)	Daemon (2019)

Singles from Esoteric Warfare
- 1. "Psywar" Released: April 25, 2014

Esoteric Warfare is the fifth studio album by Norwegian black metal band Mayhem. It was released by Season of Mist on 6 June 2014 in Europe and Asia, and on 10 June 2014 in North America. It is the band's first album with Teloch on guitar since Blasphemer's departure from the band in 2008.

== Background ==
The album was initially announced in a 2012 interview with the bass guitarist Necrobutcher with Blabbermouth.net. On 2 August 2013, the drummer Hellhammer announced on Mayhem's official Facebook page that he was then recording his drum parts for the album. Mayhem announced in November 2013 that the album had entered the mixing process and that they expected to release it in early 2014. On 18 February 2014, it was announced that a teaser 7" single containing the track "Psywar" would be released on 25 April 2014. On 19 February 2014, Mayhem's record label, Season of Mist, announced that the new album's title would be Esoteric Warfare and its release date was to be 6 June 2014. On 19 March 2014, Blabbermouth.net unveiled the album's official track listing along with other details.

== Writing and recording ==
The album was recorded and mixed between September and October in 2013. While the drums were recorded in Mølla Studio, the rest of the album was recorded in SleikBallaMi in Oslo. After recording was finished, the band returned to Mølla Studio where mixing was handled by Knut Møllarn from Arcturus. The album was mastered by Maor Applebaum in the US. The album's music was written by new guitarist Teloch, while the lyrics were handled by Christian "CERN" Fleck. In an interview with Revolver magazine, Teloch stated that "my problem with this album was to write an album that would be fitting to release after 'Ordo ad Chao.' First, I wrote almost a whole album, but it was too much back to the roots, and try to top 'Ordo' for me as a songwriter was not a option either--that would be suicide for me as songwriter for them." The band had recorded many of the aforementioned songs, but they were scrapped as Teloch was ultimately not satisfied with them, and the band started over.

According to Attila, the band wanted to make an album that "sounded like Mayhem." He said that "After the Ordo album, which was a little bit progressive—maybe a little bit too much—almost like a fusion album where riffs were not repeated and the rhythm was always out or different or kind of twisted, we wanted to go back from there instead of going forward in that direction. Every Mayhem album has a kind of unique aspect, but we wanted to go back to a little bit more traditional extreme metal. Of course, there’s all these elements that Mayhem has built up for itself as a band, but we still wanted to go back to something that was straightforward musically and a little more brutal and more like extreme metal."

As with the previous album, the lyrics focus less on the classically Satanic themes of the band's early work, instead referring to occult and conspiracy theory concepts such as psychic powers, mind control and alien tampering with human evolution. (For instance, the song "Corpse of Care" appears to be a direct allusion to Bohemian Grove and the Cremation of Care ceremony performed there.)

"Now I am become Death, the destroyer of worlds." by J. Robert Oppenheimer serves as the intro for the song Trinity which is also the code name assigned by Oppenheimer for the first detonation of a nuclear weapon.

== Critical reception ==
Professional ratings
Aggregate scores
Source	Rating
Metacritic	69/100
Review scores
Source	Rating
The Line of Best Fit	8/10
Pitchfork	7.6/10
PopMatters	2.5/5 stars
Sputnikmusic	3.7/5 stars
Le Mot du Melomaniaque	8.6/10

Upon its release, Esoteric Warfare received positive reviews from music critics. At Metacritic, which assigns a normalized rating out of 100 to reviews from critics, the album received an average score of 69, which indicates "generally favorable reviews", based on 4 reviews. Pitchfork wrote: "After 30 years, Esoteric Warfare is a Mayhem album worth talking about more for its sounds than its associated baggage." Sputnikmusic staff writer Voivod thought: "Despite being derivative, Esoteric Warfare is worthy of praise, because it keeps alive a sound practised by merely a handful of outfits, some of them sadly disbanded." Nevertheless, Alex Franquelli of PopMatters was more mixed in his assessment of the album, stating: "Mayhem are clearly trying to push the envelope of their metal, but their efforts are rendered vain by the lack of derring-do which has sealed the fate of other fellow second-wave black metallers."

== Track listing ==
All lyrics are written by Attila and CERN; all music is composed by Teloch.

No.	Title	Length
1.	"Watchers"	6:19
2.	"Psywar"	3:25
3.	"Trinity"	3:57
4.	"Pandaemon"	2:53
5.	"MILAB"	6:03
6.	"VI.Sec."	4:14
7.	"Throne of Time"	4:06
8.	"Corpse of Care"	4:06
9.	"Posthuman"	6:55
10.	"Aion Suntelia"	5:22
Total length:		47:21

=== LP and CD Collector's Box bonus track ===
No.	Title	Length
11.	"Into the Lifeless"	3:39
Total length:		51:01

=== Japanese Edition bonus track ===
No.	Title	Length
11.	"From Beyond the Event Horizon"	4:33
Total length:		51:54

== Personnel ==
Mayhem

- Attila – vocals, producer
- Teloch – guitars, music, producer, recording engineer
- Hellhammer – drums
- Necrobutcher – bass
- Ghul – guitar

Additional personnel

- Christian Fleck (aka CERN) – lyrics
- Zbigniew Bielak – cover art
- Maor Appelbaum – mastering Engineer
- Mollarn – recording engineer, mixing
- Ester Segarra – photography

== Charts ==
Chart (2014)	Peak position
Finnish Albums (Suomen virallinen lista)	32
US Heatseekers Albums (Billboard)	14
