= Dead (musician) =

Swedish black metal vocalist (1969–1991)

Background information
- Also known as: Pelle Ohlin
- Born: Per Yngve Ohlin; 16 January 1969; Västerhaninge, Stockholm County, Sweden
- Died: 8 April 1991 (aged 22) Kråkstad, Akershus, Norway
- Cause of death: Suicide by gunshot
- Genres: Black metal; death metal; thrash metal
- Occupations: Vocalist; lyricist
- Years active: 1986–1991
- Formerly of: Morbid; Mayhem

Per Yngve "Pelle" Ohlin (16 January 1969 – 8 April 1991), best known by the stage name Dead, was a Swedish musician, best known as the lead vocalist and lyricist of the Norwegian black metal band Mayhem from 1988 until his suicide in 1991. Prior to Mayhem, he performed as the vocalist in the Swedish black/death metal band Morbid. Roadrunner Records ranked him No. 48 out of 50 of The Greatest Metal Front-Men of All Time.

Dead was known for his morbid personality and obsession with death. He hoarded dead birds, wore shirts with funeral announcements printed on them and wore corpse paint—being one of the first in black metal to do so. Acquaintances and peers described Ohlin as difficult to befriend or understand. Already intensely introverted and depressed, Dead's personality and demeanor would only become more withdrawn leading up to his death, a progression marked by such patterns as harming himself offstage among friends and isolating himself for long periods in his bedroom.

Dead died by suicide in April 1991 at the age of 22. An image of his cadaver was used as the cover for the unofficially released live album The Dawn of the Black Hearts (1995).

== Early life ==
Per Yngve Ohlin (sometimes called "Pelle") was born on 16 January 1969 in Västerhaninge, Stockholm County, Sweden, to parents Anita Forsberg and Lars Ohlin, who divorced soon after his birth. As a young child, Ohlin suffered from sleep apnea. At the age of ten, he suffered internal bleeding when his spleen ruptured after what he claimed was an ice skating accident. However, in the Swedish metal book Blod eld död (English: "Blood Fire Death"), his brother Anders stated that Dead was frequently bullied in school and one day sustained a ruptured spleen as a direct result of a severe beating by bullies. Because of the injury, Ohlin had to be rushed to a hospital, where he was briefly declared clinically dead. After a few years, the incident resulted in a fascination with death, and later inspired his stage name.

As a teenager, Ohlin developed a taste for heavy metal and rock music, citing bands like Black Sabbath, Kiss, Iron Maiden, Judas Priest, AC/DC, Motörhead, Venom, Metallica, Bathory, Sodom and Mercyful Fate as his favourites. Despite his love for Bathory, he was very displeased after their change in musical style and consequently referred to Quorthon as "a wimp".

== Career ==
=== Morbid and Mayhem ===
In early 1986, Ohlin founded the Swedish death/thrash metal group Morbid, with which he recorded a demo tape called December Moon. Disappointed that the band wasn't "going anywhere", he decided to contact members of Mayhem as he was aware the group were in need of a new frontman following vocalist Maniac's departure. According to Mayhem bassist Jørn "Necrobutcher" Stubberud, Dead initially sent the band members a small parcel containing a demo tape, a letter detailing his ideas for the future and a crucified mouse. Although Necrobutcher lost the package itself, he kept the tape which had Dead's contact details. After getting ahold of him and inviting him to a rehearsal, Dead moved to Norway in early 1988 and became the new official vocalist for Mayhem.

=== Performances ===
Dead (left) with Euronymous

For concerts, Dead went to great lengths to achieve the image and atmosphere he wished. From the beginning of his career, he wore corpse paint, which involved covering his face with black and white makeup. According to Necrobutcher, "[i]t wasn't anything to do with the way Kiss and Alice Cooper used makeup. Dead actually wanted to look like a corpse. He didn't do it to look cool". Mayhem drummer Jan Axel "Hellhammer" Blomberg claimed that Dead "was the first black metal musician to use corpse paint", although this statement has been proven to be debatable as Mayhem guitarist Øystein "Euronymous" Aarseth can be seen wearing corpse paint in live footage as early as 1985. To complete his corpse-like image, Dead would bury his stage clothes and dig them up again to wear on the night of a concert. According to Hellhammer: "Before the shows, Dead used to bury his clothes into the ground so that they could start to rot and get that grave scent. He was a corpse on a stage... Once he even asked us to bury him in the ground — he wanted his skin to become pale".

During one tour with Mayhem, Dead found a dead crow and kept it in a plastic bag. He often carried it with him and would smell the bird before going onstage, to sing "with the stench of death in his nostrils". He would also collect dead geese and keep them underneath his bed.

Dead would cut himself while singing onstage. During a gig in Jessheim on February 3, 1990, he slashed his arm with a broken bottle. Emperor drummer Bård Guldvik "Faust" Eithun claims that Dead had to be taken to hospital after the gig, but arrived too late and so "it was no use to give him stitches".

In an interview conducted by Marduk guitarist Morgan Håkansson and published in the fanzine Slayer, Dead explained how he and the rest of Mayhem would expel poseurs at their concerts. Reciting the events of one particular show, he claimed, "Before we began to play there was a crowd of about 300 in there, but in the second song 'Necrolust' we began to throw around those pig heads. Only 50 were left". He and the other members enjoyed this sort of practice; he concluded with, "If someone doesn't like blood and rotten flesh thrown in their face they can FUCK OFF, and that's exactly what they do".

Dead made a brief appearance in the 1988 music video for Candlemass' "Bewitched".

== Personality ==
In interviews, fellow musicians often described Dead as odd and introverted. Hellhammer described Dead as "a very strange personality […] depressed, melancholic and dark." Likewise, Euronymous once said, "I honestly think Dead is mentally insane. Which other way can you describe a guy who does not eat, in order to get starving wounds? Or who has a T-shirt with funeral announcements on it?" Former Mayhem drummer Kjetil Manheim later likened Dead's personality to that of Marvin the Paranoid Android. Some authors have speculated that Dead may have had Cotard's syndrome, a very rare condition that manifests in believing one's body is not that of a living human but instead a corpse.

According to Faust: "Dead wasn't a guy you could know very well. I think even the other guys in Mayhem didn't know him very well. He was hard to get close to. I met him two weeks before he died. I'd met him maybe six to eight times, in all. He had lots of weird ideas. I remember Aarseth was talking about him and said he did not have any humor. He did, but it was very obscure. Honestly, I don't think he was enjoying living in this world, which of course resulted in the suicide." Stian "Occultus" Johannsen, who briefly took over as vocalist after Dead's suicide, remarked that Dead did not even possess a normal perception of himself: "He didn't see himself as human; he saw himself as a creature from another world. He said he had many visions that his blood has frozen in his veins, that he was dead. That is the reason he took that name. He knew he would die."

According to a longtime pen pal known as "Old Nick", Ohlin disliked technology. He would only ever write letters to himself or others using longhand style and would never resort to the use of a PC. Old Nick concluded "technology in general made him uncomfortable. He just rejected it altogether, finding refuge in a world made of forests and woodlands." Dead also had an unusual interest with porphyria due to its connection to the mythology of vampirism. In his letters, Dead expressed a fascination with the occult, even stating that his great-grandmother had practiced white magic. Dead stated that for a time, specifically to better understand his near death experience, he had attempted before to perform his own rituals but was ultimately unsuccessful in his practices.

== Self-harm and suicide ==
Excuse the blood, but I have slit my wrists and neck. It was the intention that I would die in the woods so that it would take a few days before I was possibly found. I belong in the woods and have always done so. No one will understand the reason for this anyway. To give some semblance of an explanation I'm not a human, this is just a dream and soon I will wake. It was too cold and the blood kept clotting, plus the new knife is too dull. If I don't succeed dying to the knife I will blow all the shit out of my skull. Yet I do not know. I left all my lyrics by "Let the good times roll"—plus the rest of the money. Whoever finds it gets the fucking thing. As a last salutation may I present "Life Eternal". Do whatever you want with it. / Pelle. I didn't come up with this now, but seventeen years ago.

— Dead's suicide note (translated to English from Swedish)

In time, Dead's social situation, depression and fixation on death caused his mental state to worsen greatly. He would casually cut himself while in the presence of his friends, who would have to subdue him and treat his wounds. Although this upset many of his friends, Euronymous grew fascinated with Dead's suicidal ideologies because he felt extreme negativity fit Mayhem's image—and according to them, he encouraged Dead to kill himself. Manheim said: "I don't know if Øystein did it out of pure evil or if he was just fooling around."

By 1991, Dead, Euronymous and Hellhammer were living in a house in the woods near Kråkstad, which was used as a place for the band to rehearse. According to Hellhammer, Dead spent much of his time writing letters and drawing. He "just sat in his room and became more and more depressed." Necrobutcher said that, after living together for a while, Dead and Euronymous "got on each other's nerves a lot." Hellhammer recalls an incident where Dead once retreated outside to sleep in the woods because Euronymous was playing synth music that Dead hated. Euronymous followed and began shooting into the air with a shotgun to further antagonize him. Varg Vikernes of Burzum claims that Dead once stabbed Euronymous with a knife during an altercation. Vikernes also claims to have sent Mayhem ammunition, including shotgun shells, as a Christmas gift, although he claimed those were not the shells Dead used to kill himself, and that he instead saved a "special shell" particularly to be used for his suicide.

On 8 April 1991, while left alone in the house, Dead used a kitchen knife to slit his wrists and throat and, afterward, shot himself in the forehead with a shotgun. He left a brief suicide note which started with the line, "Excuse the blood...". His body was found by Euronymous, who had to climb through an open window as the doors were locked and there were no other keys to the house. Instead of calling the police immediately, Euronymous hitchhiked to a nearby shop to purchase a disposable camera with which he photographed the body; after re-arranging some items for his pictures, he proceeded to call emergency services.

Dead's suicide caused a rift between Euronymous and some of his friends, who were disgusted by his attitude towards Dead before the suicide, and his behavior about Dead's death afterwards. Necrobutcher ended his friendship with Euronymous and left Mayhem. Manheim later speculated that Euronymous had willfully left Dead alone in the house so that he would have a chance to kill himself. Dead's suicide was said to cause "a change in mentality" in the black metal scene and was the first in a string of infamous events carried out by its members.

An obituary in a Swedish newspaper stated that Dead's funeral was held at Österhaninge kyrka on Friday 26 April 1991. He was buried at Österhaninge cemetery in Stockholm County.

== Aftermath and legacy ==
Euronymous used Dead's suicide to foster Mayhem's "evil" image and claimed Dead had killed himself because black metal had become "trendy" and commercialized. Necrobutcher speculated that taking the pictures and forcing others to see them was a way for Euronymous to cope with the shock of seeing his friend's body. After Hellhammer developed the photos, Euronymous initially promised to destroy them but ultimately did not. He stored them in an envelope at his record shop and sent one to the owner of Warmaster Records, which resulted in its use as cover art for the bootleg live album The Dawn of the Black Hearts (1995). The cover of Mayhem's Live in Leipzig contains part of Dead's suicide note: Jag är inte en människa. Det här är bara en dröm, och snart vaknar jag. (I am not a human being. This is just a dream, and soon I will wake.) While the cover image of The Dawn of the Black Hearts was shot by Euronymous, he had already been murdered by the time it was released, and being an unauthorized release, the remaining Mayhem members loathed its existence and distribution. Necrobutcher was deeply disturbed by Euronymous' actions and behavior following Dead's death, and is quoted saying "I might punch you in the face if you wear [the photo of Dead's corpse] on a T-shirt." The record was officially reissued in 2017 under the name Live in Sarpsborg, using a photo of Necrobutcher as a new cover.

In time, rumors spread that Euronymous had made a stew with bits of Dead's brain and had made necklaces with bits of his skull. The band later denied the former rumor, but confirmed that the latter was true. Moreover, Euronymous claimed to have given these necklaces to musicians he deemed worthy, which was confirmed by several other members of the scene, like Faust, Håkansson and Metalion.

Necrobutcher noted that "people became more aware of the black metal scene after Dead had shot himself ... I think it was Dead's suicide that really changed the scene".

== Discography ==
Ohlin contributed vocals to all of the following:

As a part of Morbid

- Morbid Rehearsal (1987) (Demo album)
- December Moon (1987) (Demo album)
- Live in Stockholm (2000) (Live album)
- Year of the Goat (2011) (Compilation album)

As a part of Mayhem

- Live in Leipzig (1993) (Live album)
- The Dawn of the Black Hearts (1995) (bootleg live album)
- Freezing Moon/Carnage (1996) (Single)
- Out from the Dark (1996) (Demo album)
- Live in Zeitz (2016) (Live album)
- Live in Jessheim (2017) (Live album)
- De Mysteriis Dom Sathanas: The Dead Files (2017) (Compilation album)
- Deathcrush: The Dead Version (2018) (Compilation album)
- Live in Sarpsborg (2019) (Live album)
- Henhouse Recordings (2019) vinyl, (2020) DVD and CD with rehearsal footage.

Split albums

- A Tribute to the Black Emperors (1994) (Morbid and Mayhem compilation album)

== Works cited ==
- Moynihan, Michael; Søderlind, Didrik (2003) [1998]. Lords of Chaos: The Bloody Rise of the Satanic Metal Underground (revised and expanded ed.). Feral House.
