= De Mysteriis Dom Sathanas =

Studio album by Mayhem
- Released: 24 May 1994
- Recorded: 22 June 1992 – May 1993
- Studio: Grieg Hall in Bergen, Norway
- Genre: Black metal
- Length: 45:58
- Label: Deathlike Silence
- Producers: Pytten; Euronymous; Hellhammer

Mayhem chronology
Live in Leipzig (1993)	De Mysteriis Dom Sathanas (1994)	Grand Declaration of War (2000)

De Mysteriis Dom Sathanas is the debut studio album by Norwegian black metal band Mayhem. Songwriting began in 1987, but due to the suicide of vocalist Per "Dead" Ohlin and the murder of guitarist Øystein "Euronymous" Aarseth, the album's release was delayed until May 1994. De Mysteriis Dom Sathanas is widely regarded as one of the most influential black metal albums of all time. It is the band's only studio album to feature Aarseth and Varg "Count Grishnackh" Vikernes.

== Background and recording ==
=== 1987–1991 ===
Mayhem began writing songs for the album in late 1987 or early 1988, depending on the source. Vocalist Dead started to write the lyrics when he joined the band in 1988. In 1990 studio versions of the songs "The Freezing Moon" and "Carnage" were recorded, appearing on the CBR Records compilation album Projections of a Stained Mind. Mayhem's drummer, Jan Axel "Hellhammer" Blomberg, claimed that the lyrics of "Freezing Moon" were "meant to make people commit suicide". Dead said in a 1989 interview by Marduk guitarist Morgan "Evil" Håkansson, published in Slayer fanzine, that by then he had written the lyrics for "Funeral Fog", "Freezing Moon", "Buried by Time and Dust" and "Pagan Fears". Finished versions of these songs appeared on the album Live in Leipzig, a concert recording from November 1990 which was released in 1993.

By 1991, Dead and Euronymous were living in a house in the woods near Kråkstad, which was used by the band to rehearse. On 8 April 1991, while alone in the house, Dead slit his wrists and throat and then shot himself in the forehead with a shotgun. He left a brief suicide note, which apologized for having used the gun indoors and began with "Excuse the blood". His body was found by Euronymous. Before calling the police, he went to a nearby shop and bought a disposable camera with which he photographed the body, after re-arranging some items. One of these photographs was later used as the cover of a bootleg live album titled The Dawn of the Black Hearts.

=== 1991–1994 ===
To record the new album, Euronymous recruited Attila Csihar (from the Hungarian band Tormentor) as vocalist and Varg Vikernes (who performed solo as Burzum) as bassist. This lineup – Euronymous, Hellhammer, Csihar and Vikernes – recorded the album during late 1992 and early 1993 at the Grieg Hall in Bergen. According to Attila Csihar, the whole album was recorded in three days. The album itself contained no information on lineup and credits. Necrobutcher, who had left the band before the recording sessions, claimed to have written half of the songs for the album. He stated that he and Dead wrote "Freezing Moon" and Euronymous only contributed one riff to that song. Snorre "Blackthorn" Ruch (who performed solo as Thorns) wrote some of the riffs for the album and finished some of Dead's song lyrics, according to himself and Hellhammer. The main riff of the Thorns song "Into the Promised Land" (also called "Lovely Children") became the main riff of "From the Dark Past". According to Vikernes, Euronymous was responsible for most of the guitar riffs, but he claimed that Hellhammer, Necrobutcher and himself contributed some riffs, too.

On 10 August 1993, Vikernes and Blackthorn traveled to Euronymous's apartment in Oslo, where Vikernes stabbed Euronymous to death. He was arrested and sentenced to 21 years in prison, while Blackthorn was sentenced to 8 years for being an accomplice. Vikernes claims that he killed Euronymous in self-defense.

During Vikernes's trial, police said that they had found explosives and ammunition in Vikernes's home. Euronymous and Vikernes had allegedly plotted to blow up Nidaros Cathedral, which appears on the album cover, to coincide with the album's release. Vikernes denied this allegation in a 2009 interview, saying, "I was getting the explosives and ammunition in order to defend Norway if we were attacked any time. During the Cold War, the United States and the Soviet Union could have decided to attack us."

After Euronymous's funeral, Hellhammer and Necrobutcher worked on releasing the album. Euronymous's parents asked Hellhammer to remove the bass tracks recorded by Vikernes. Hellhammer refused, saying, "I thought it was appropriate that the murderer and victim were on the same record. I put word out that I was re-recording the bass parts, but I never did".

The album was eventually released in May 1994, around the time that Vikernes was sentenced. It featured the last lyrics written by Dead before his suicide, and the last songs recorded by Euronymous before his murder.

In 2009, Mayhem released rough mixes of five songs from the De Mysteriis Dom Sathanas recording session as the EP Life Eternal.

== Music ==
Steve Huey of AllMusic said: "The music is fast and furious, and the stomach-turning vocals are unintelligible."

== Title and artwork ==
The title De Mysteriis Dom Sathanas is a broken Latin phrase which was purported to mean "(About) The Mysteries of the Lord Satan", with "Dom" being an abbreviation of "Domini", often used as an honorific prefix for ecclesiastics of the Catholic Church. However, the title more accurately translates to something such as "About/Of Lord Satan's Mysteries". Equally the word "mysterii" is not only textually translatable as "mystery", but also can mean words such as "secret worship/ritual/rite". So, when pluralized as it is in the title, "Mysteriis" can indeed translate to "Secret Rites". The word "Sathanas" is a common alternative spelling for "Satanas" in medieval Latin.

The album cover is a monochrome photo of the east side of Nidaros Cathedral in Trondheim, Norway. It was rumored that members of the band who had already been associated with the burnings of other Christian churches in Norway had planned to destroy the cathedral.

== Reception ==
Professional ratings
Review scores
Source	Rating
AllMusic	4/5 stars
Collector's Guide to Heavy Metal	0/10
The Encyclopedia of Popular Music	3/5 stars
Kerrang!	(1994) (2011)
Metal.de	10/10
Metal Storm	8.9/10

The album is widely considered one of the most influential black metal albums ever. According to a long feature by Metal Hammer, "Two decades after it was recorded, it continues to top 'best album' lists by longtime fans of the genre, while at the same time providing primary inspiration for new bands whose members were not even born when it was recorded. There are many who would say it is the single most important album in black metal's broad and ever-growing catalogue, and very few who would argue that it is not, at the very least, a strong contender for that accolade." Metal Injection described it as "one of the most essential black metal albums of all time", writing that "In one record, the listener is exposed to all the power, glory and contradictions inherent in Norwegian black metal, thus making it a fascinating artifact from the dark past, and an essential piece of black metal listening." De Mysteriis Dom Sathanas was included on IGN's list of "10 Great Black Metal Albums". Metal Hammer named it one of the 20 best black metal albums of the '90s. Loudwire named it the 8th best extreme metal album of all time, writing that "The riffs are unforgettable and the atmosphere is caustic and suffocating with Attila Csihar's twisted, throaty cries sending it all to hell. They also argued that the album has a "stranglehold" on "black metal's legacy". Treble named it one of the 10 essential black metal albums.

Steve Huey of AllMusic gave the album four stars in his retrospective review, saying: "Mayhem avoids being simply standard by making subtle changes in their sound throughout the album and not falling into a rut or repeating themselves, as too many other black metal bands tend to do. This album may require a bit of patience, but it is worth it."

In 2013, Decibel placed De Mysteriis Dom Sathanas at number two on its list of the Top 100 Black Metal Albums of All Time. In 2017, Rolling Stone ranked it at number 40 on their list of 'The 100 Greatest Metal Albums of All Time.'

While Mayhem's previous vocalist, Dead had been Swedish, Csihar was from Hungary. His style was somewhat atypical for Nordic black metal then, and provoked a mixed reception from fans; for example, Metalreviews.com gave him the nickname "Attila 'Fingernails' Csihar" (although a subsequent review by the website praised his later Ordo Ad Chao-era performances). The song "Freezing Moon" was included on Kerrang!'s 25 Extreme Metal Anthems and various songs from this album have been covered live and in studio by such bands as Dissection (Jon Nödtveidt and Ole Öhman also performed the song with Euronymous in 1991), Immortal, Dark Funeral, Carpathian Forest, Gorgoroth, Behemoth, Vader, Enslaved, Cradle of Filth and Darkmoon. "Funeral Fog" was covered by Emperor with Csihar on vocals.

== Track listing ==
No songwriting credits exist in liner notes. Credits for Tracks 1, 2 and 4 according to Lords of Chaos (2018) end credits; credits for 3 and 6 from ASCAP.

No.	Title	Lyrics	Music	Length
1.	"Funeral Fog"	Dead	Jørn Stubberud, Øystein Aerseth	5:47
2.	"Freezing Moon"	Dead	Aerseth, Stubberud, Jan Axel Blomberg	6:23
3.	"Cursed in Eternity"	Necrobutcher	Aerseth, Blomberg, Stubberud, Snorre Ruch, Ohlin	5:10
4.	"Pagan Fears"	Dead	Aerseth, Stubberud, Blomberg	6:20
5.	"Life Eternal"	Dead		6:57
6.	"From the Dark Past"	Dead, Blackthorn	Ruch, Aarseth, Blomberg	5:26
7.	"Buried by Time and Dust"	Dead		3:34
8.	"De Mysteriis Dom Sathanas"	Dead, Blackthorn		6:21
Total length:				45:58

== Personnel ==
=== Mayhem ===
- Euronymous – guitar, producer, songwriting
- Hellhammer – drums, producer, songwriting

=== Additional personnel ===
- Attila Csihar – vocals
- Count Grishnackh – bass guitar (uncredited)
- Necrobutcher – songwriting
- Dead – songwriting
- Blackthorn – wrote some of the lyrics and guitar riffs. "From the Dark Past" features riffs taken from his band Thorns's demo "Grymyrk".
- Pytten – producer

== Charts ==
Chart performance for De Mysteriis Dom Sathanas
Chart (2020)	Peak position
German Albums (Offizielle Top 100)	60
Norwegian Albums (VG-lista)	35
