= Mayhem (band) =

Norwegian black metal band

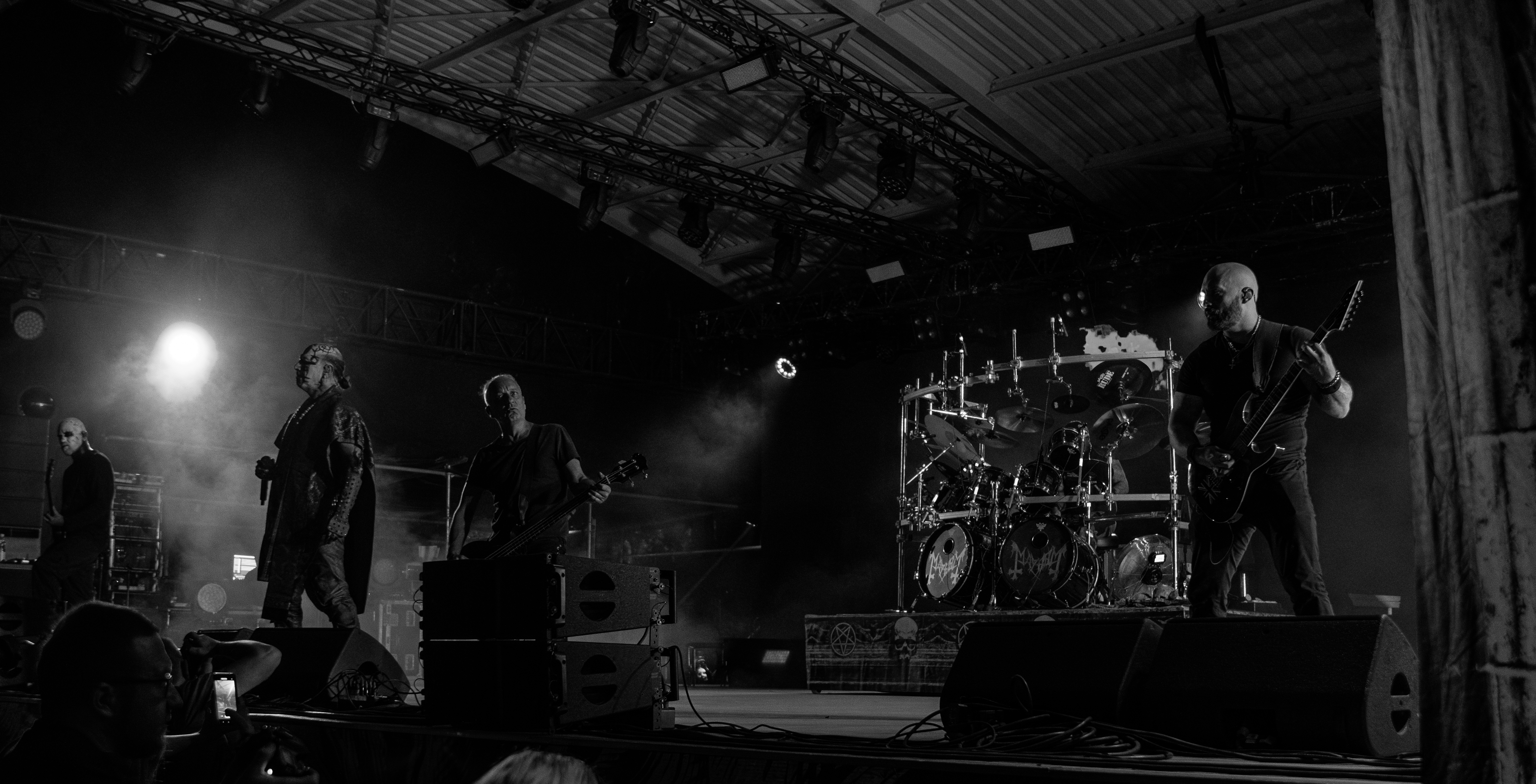
- Mayhem performing live in 2024

Background information
- Origin: Oslo, Norway
- Genre: Black metal
- Works: Discography
- Years active: 1984–1993; 1995–present
- Labels: Deathlike Silence; Obscure Plasma; Misanthropy; Season of Mist; Necropolis; Century Media
- Members: Necrobutcher; Hellhammer; Attila Csihar; Teloch; Ghul
- Past members: Euronymous; Manheim; Messiah; Maniac; Dead; Occultus; Count Grishnackh; Blackthorn; Blasphemer
- Website: thetruemayhem.com

Mayhem is a Norwegian black metal band formed in Oslo in 1984. They were one of the pioneers of the Norwegian black metal scene, and their music has profoundly influenced the black metal genre. Mayhem's early career was marked by several controversies, including their notorious live performances, the 1991 suicide of vocalist Per Yngve Ohlin ("Dead"), and the 1993 murder of guitarist Øystein Aarseth ("Euronymous") by former bassist Varg Vikernes ("Count Grishnackh").

The group released a demo and an EP, which were highly influential and amassed a devoted following. Their sporadic live performances added to Mayhem's infamy, and the band was also noted for their connections to a series of Norwegian church arsons and other crimes. Mayhem temporarily disbanded following Aarseth's murder, shortly before the release of their debut album De Mysteriis Dom Sathanas.

In 1995, Mayhem reformed with new guitarist Rune Eriksen ("Blasphemer") and three members from earlier incarnations: drummer Jan Axel Blomberg ("Hellhammer"), bassist Jørn Stubberud ("Necrobutcher"), and vocalist Sven Erik Kristiansen ("Maniac"). Attila Csihar and Morten Iversen ("Teloch") have since replaced Kristiansen and Eriksen, respectively. Their post-Aarseth material is characterized by increased experimentation. The 2007 album Ordo Ad Chao, received the Spellemann Award for Best Heavy Metal Album and later received the Honorary Award in 2021.

== History ==
=== 1984–1988: Early years ===
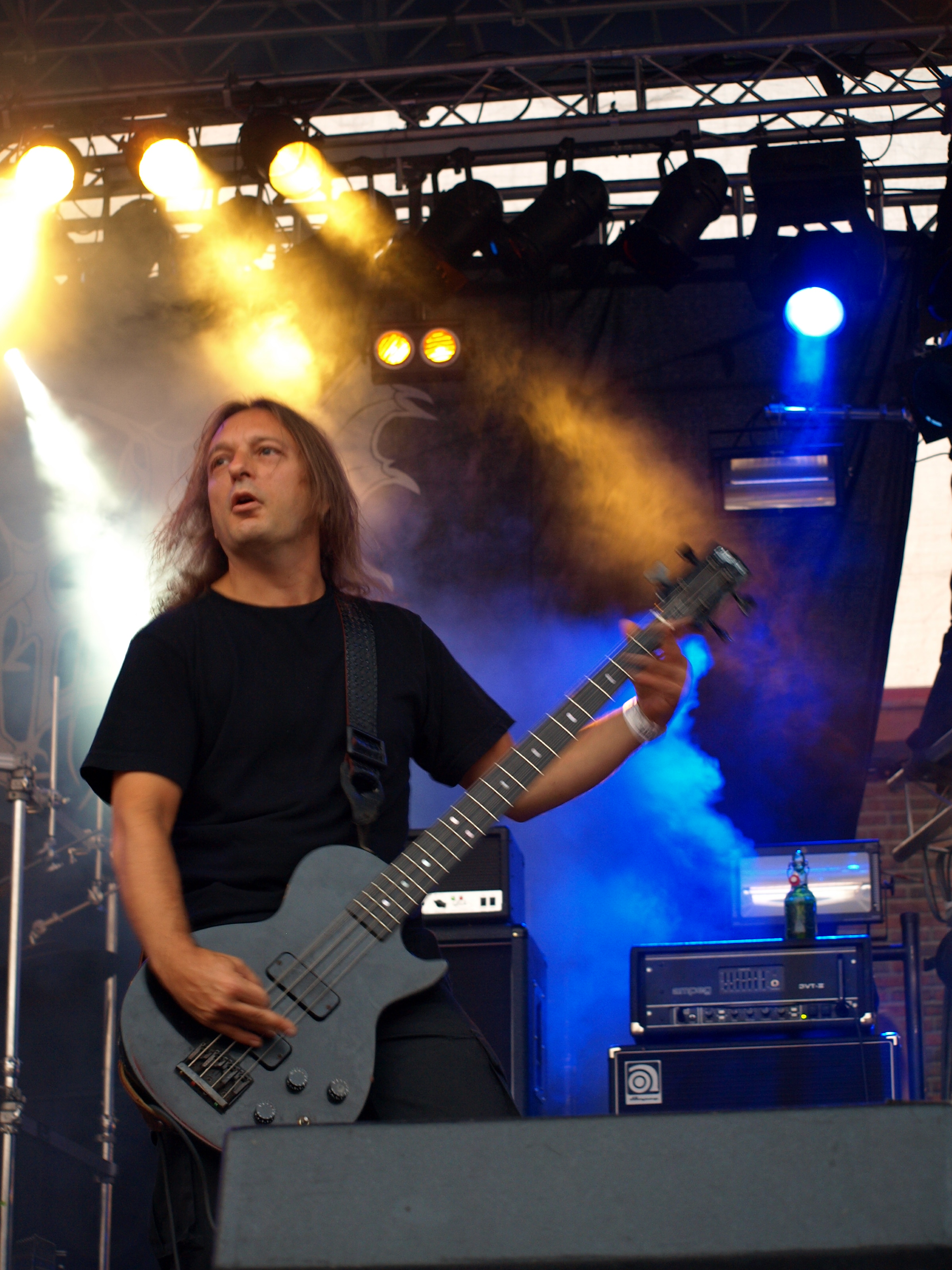
Founding bassist Necrobutcher performing in 2008

Mayhem was founded in 1984 by guitarist Øystein Aarseth (initially known as "Destructor", later "Euronymous"), bassist and vocalist Jørn Stubberud ("Necrobutcher"), and drummer Kjetil Manheim. The band took their name from the Venom song "Mayhem with Mercy". The lineup began performing cover songs by Black Sabbath, Venom and Motörhead. Once they began to write their own music, their major influences were Venom, Motörhead, Black Sabbath, Slayer, Bathory and Celtic Frost. Other significant influences include Sarcófago, Parabellum, Hellhammer, Amebix, GBH, the Exploited, Discharge, the Misfits, Dead Kennedys, Sodom, Destruction, Tormentor, Tangerine Dream, Pink Floyd and Marillion. Soon, they recorded the demo Pure Fucking Armageddon. After its release, Aarseth and Stubberud, during the studio rehearsals for the first demo, recruited two session members, Eirik Norheim ("Messiah") and Sven Erik Kristiansen ("Maniac"), in 1986 and 1987. Norheim performed only at one concert, which took place on 20 April 1985 in Ski, and by the end of that year, he had left Mayhem. He later formed the hardcore punk band Within Range and the Oi!/street punk band Cockroach Clan. With Kristiansen, Mayhem recorded their first EP, Deathcrush, in 1987, which was released through Euronymous' newly formed label Posercorpse Music. Manheim and Euronymous only performed at one show on 22 March 1986 at the Ski theater under the name L.E.G.O., which was recorded on video. This was a side project focused on experimental music that challenged mainstream conventions.

The initial release of Deathcrush, limited to 1,000 copies, quickly sold out. It was later reissued in 1993 by the newly renamed Deathlike Silence Productions in collaboration with Euronymous' Oslo specialist record shop Helvete (Norwegian for "Hell"). Manheim and Kristiansen departed the band in 1988.

=== 1988–1991: With Dead ===
After two brief replacements, the roles of vocalist and drummer in Mayhem were filled by Swedish vocalist Pelle Yngve Ohlin ("Dead") and local drummer Jan Axel Blomberg ("Hellhammer"). With Dead, the band's concerts gained notoriety for their extreme theatricality and atmosphere. From the outset of his career, Dead was known for wearing "corpse paint", involving the application of black and white makeup to achieve a ghastly appearance. According to Necrobutcher, "it wasn't anything to do with the way Kiss and Alice Cooper used makeup. Dead actually wanted to look like a corpse. He didn't do it to look cool." Hellhammer asserted that Dead was "the first black-metal musician to use corpse paint." To complete his corpse-like image, Dead would bury his stage clothes and dig them up to wear on concert nights.

During performances, Dead would often cut himself with hunting knives and broken glass. The band frequently featured pig or sheep heads impaled on stakes at the front of the stage.

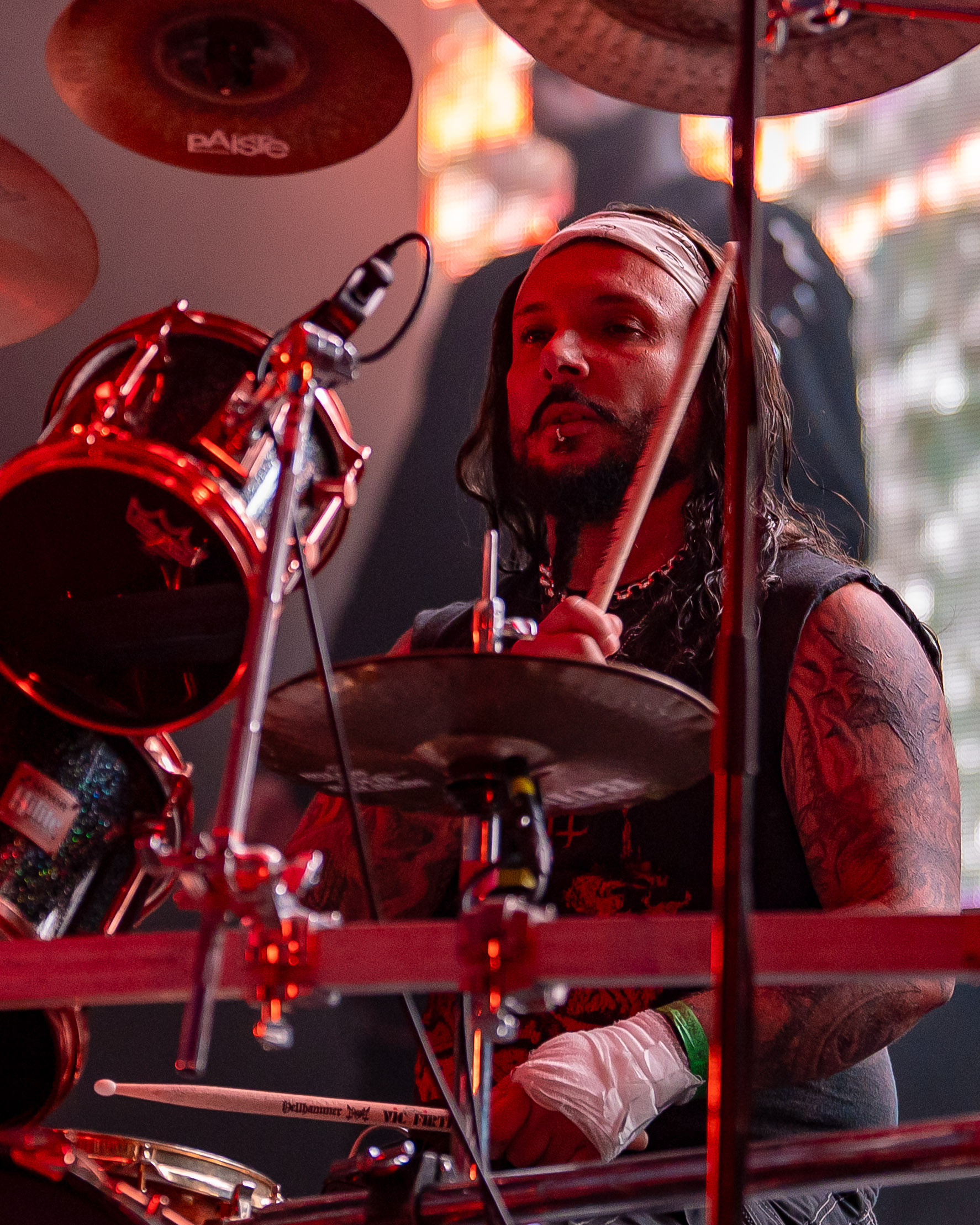
A prolific Norwegian heavy metal drummer, Hellhammer has remained with the group since joining in 1988.

Stian Johansen ("Occultus"), who shortly took over as vocalist after Dead's suicide, commented on him:

"He [Dead] didn't see himself as human; he saw himself as a creature from another world. He said he had many visions that his blood has frozen in his veins, that he was dead. That is the reason he took that name. He knew he would die."

In 1990, the members of Mayhem moved to "an old house in the forest" near Oslo, which they used as a rehearsal space. They began writing songs for their next album, De Mysteriis Dom Sathanas. Mayhem bassist Necrobutcher noted that, after living together for a time, Dead and Euronymous "got on each other's nerves a lot" and "weren't really friends at the end." Hellhammer recalled an incident where Dead once went outside to sleep in the woods because Euronymous was playing synthesizer music that Dead detested. Euronymous then followed him outside, shooting into the air with a shotgun. Varg Vikernes alleged that Dead once stabbed Euronymous with a knife.

On April 8, 1991, Dead committed suicide in the house rented by the band. He was found by Euronymous, who discovered him with slit wrists and a shotgun wound to the head. Dead's suicide note began with "Excuse all the blood" and included an explanation: "nobody will ever understand this, but as a sort of explanation, I am not human, this is only a dream and soon I will awake." The note concluded with the phrase, "I didn't come up with this now but 17 years ago." Attached to the note were the lyrics to the song "Life Eternal." Upon discovering Dead’s body, Euronymous went to a nearby store, purchased a disposable camera, and photographed the corpse after rearranging certain items.

Necrobutcher recounted Euronymous informing him about the suicide:

Øystein called me up the next day ... and says, "Dead has done something really cool! He killed himself." I thought, have you lost it? What do you mean cool? He says, "Relax, I have photos of everything." I was in shock and grief. He was just thinking how to exploit it. So I told him, "OK. Don't even fucking call me before you destroy those pictures."

Euronymous subsequently used Dead's suicide to cultivate Mayhem's 'evil' image, claiming that Dead had taken his life due to the commercialization of black metal. In time, rumors circulated that Euronymous had made a stew from bits of Dead's brain and fashioned necklaces from fragments of his skull. The band later denied the former rumor, confirming only the latter. Moreover, Euronymous claimed to have given these necklaces to musicians he deemed worthy, a claim supported by several others in the scene, including Bård 'Faust' Eithun and Jon 'Metalion' Kristiansen. In 2018, a fragment of Dead's skull went on sale for $3,500, accompanied by a letter from Euronymous stating: "OK! That should be all. I'm enclosing a little piece from Dead's cranium in case you'd like to have it. Hear from you soon!" In a 2019 interview with Loudwire and Consequence of Sound, Necrobutcher stated he had contemplated killing Euronymous due to his treatment of Dead, but that Vikernes "beat [him] to it."

Fans of the band have continued the trend of using blood in artwork. Notably, Hellhammer himself penned the lyrics to "Pagan Fears" in his own blood in October 2019.

=== 1991–1994: Murder of Euronymous, De Mysteriis Dom Sathanas and breakup ===
Dead's suicide and Euronymous's actions following it profoundly affected Necrobutcher, prompting him to leave Mayhem, which reduced the band to two members. The group rehearsed briefly thereafter with Occultus, who joined with plans to begin recording vocal and bass tracks for Mayhem's debut album, De Mysteriis Dom Sathanas. However, this arrangement was short-lived; Occultus departed the band after receiving a death threat from Euronymous. In July 1993, Live in Leipzig was released as the band's tribute to Dead.

In late 1992, recording for Mayhem's upcoming album resumed, leading Aarseth to enlist three additional session musicians: Burzum's Varg Vikernes (stage name "Count Grishnackh"), Thorns' Snorre W. Ruch ("Blackthorn"), who handled bass guitar and rhythm guitar respectively, and vocalist Attila Csihar, of the Hungarian black metal band Tormentor. Due to complaints from his parents, Euronymous closed his central record shop, Helvete, citing adverse media and police attention as reasons. Much of the album was recorded during the first half of 1993 at the Grieg Hall in Bergen. To coincide with the album's release, Euronymous and Vikernes conspired to blow up Nidaros Cathedral, which is featured on the album cover. Euronymous's murder in August 1993 brought this plan to a halt and delayed the album's release.

On the 10th of August 1993, Vikernes murdered Euronymous. That night, Vikernes and Ruch traveled 518 km from Bergen to Euronymous's apartment in Oslo. Upon their arrival, a confrontation ensued, culminating in Vikernes fatally stabbing Euronymous. His body was discovered outside the apartment, bearing twenty-three stab wounds—two to the head, five to the neck, and sixteen to the back. Vikernes contends that Euronymous had plotted to torture him to death and videotape the event, using a meeting about an unsigned contract as a pretext. On the night of the murder, Vikernes claims he intended to present Euronymous with the signed contract and "tell him to fuck off," but that Euronymous attacked him first. Additionally, Vikernes claimed that most of Euronymous's stab wounds were inflicted by broken glass he fell onto during the struggle. Vikernes was arrested within days, and a few months later, he was sentenced to 21 years in prison, the maximum sentence in Norway, for both the murder and church arsons; he was released from prison in 2009. Blackthorn, who waited for Vikernes downstairs and played no role in Aarseth's murder, was charged with complicity and sentenced to eight years in prison. With only Attila and Hellhammer remaining, Mayhem effectively ceased to exist.

In a video interview with Consequence of Sound on 15 October 2019, Necrobutcher discussed his lingering bitterness toward Euronymous after being replaced in the band by Varg Vikernes prior to the recording of De Mysteriis Dom Sathanas. He recounted his thoughts on Euronymous's murder, stating that:

"OK, I can tell it right now, because I've been holding it in for many years, but actually I was on my way down to kill him myself. And when it happened, I saw the morning paper, thinking 'Fuck, I gotta get home to my place and get out all the weapons and drugs and shit I had in my house, because they're coming to my house because I'm probably going to be the No. 1 suspect for this.' But little did I know that the Norwegian police already knew that Count Grishnackh [Varg] was going down also to kill him. Because they bugged his phone, and he actually talked about this killing before he went to Bergen so the cops already knew that he was coming, so they probably were thinking to themselves, 'We didn't nail this guy for the church burnings, so let's nail him for murder, and get rid of this fucking guy in Oslo the same time.' So that's basically what happened."

In May 1994, De Mysteriis Dom Sathanas was released and dedicated to Euronymous. Its release had been postponed due to objections raised by Euronymous's parents, who protested the inclusion of bass guitar parts performed by Vikernes. According to Vikernes, Hellhammer assured Aarseth's parents that he would re-record the bass tracks himself; however, being unable to play bass guitar, Hellhammer left the bass tracks unchanged, resulting in the album featuring Vikernes as bassist.

=== 1995–2004: Reunion with Maniac and Necrobutcher and introduction of Blasphemer ===
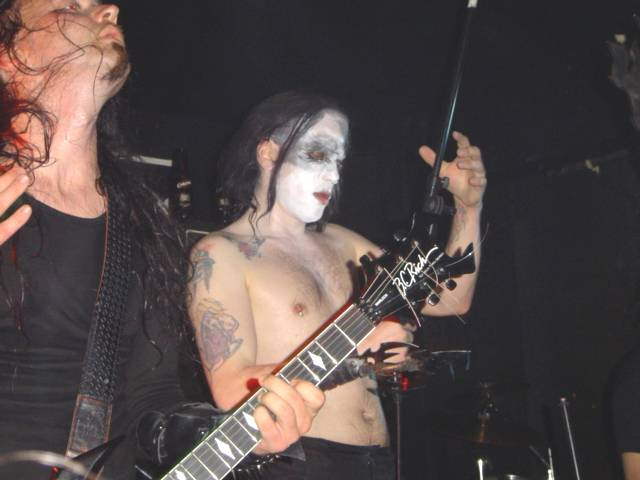
Blasphemer (left) and Maniac (right) joined the band during its 1995 reformation.

In 1995, a bootleg live recording of a 1990 Mayhem concert was released, titled The Dawn of the Black Hearts. Despite its bootleg status, the album is sometimes considered one of the band's main releases, primarily due to the notoriety surrounding its cover art, which features one of the aforementioned photographs of Dead shortly after he died by suicide.

Around this time, Hellhammer, Maniac, and Necrobutcher reformed the band with new guitarist Rune Eriksen ("Blasphemer") in place of Euronymous. Despite generating some controversy and skepticism over the decision to reform without founding member Euronymous, the group returned with the 1997 Wolf's Lair Abyss EP.

In this new phase, statements from Hellhammer (who expressed views against race mixing and foreigners in Norway) and the use of Nazi imagery, such as swastika flags in the rehearsal room, the Totenkopf emblem and band merchandise featuring the symbol of the military branch of Nasjonal Samling led to controversy and accusations of neo-Nazism.

Additionally, Hellhammer stated that no member of the new line-up identified as a Satanist, and that the "Satanic stuff […] isn't what I feel Mayhem is about today. […] Mayhem's music is still dark, but I wouldn't say that it's Satanic."

The band's second full-length album, Grand Declaration of War, was released in 2000. Strongly influenced by progressive and avant-garde metal, with Maniac partially abandoning the traditional black metal rasp in favor of dramatic spoken-word monologues, the album was concept-based, exploring themes of war and post-apocalyptic destruction.

Mayhem made headlines in 2003 when fan Per Kristian Hagen suffered a fractured skull after being struck by a severed sheep's head that had been thrown into the audience from the stage. Assault charges were filed, but the band maintained that it was entirely accidental.

The band released Chimera in 2004, marking a return to their initial raw sound while incorporating higher production value and a progressive edge.

Later that year, Maniac left the band. According to Necrobutcher, this departure was due to his alcoholism, which was exacerbated by stage fright. Necrobutcher explained that due to this tendency, a violent altercation between the singer and Blasphemer led to the guitarist kicking Maniac down a flight of stairs, resulting in injury. Csihar was reinstated as his replacement.

=== 2004–2008: Return of Csihar; Ordo Ad Chao ===
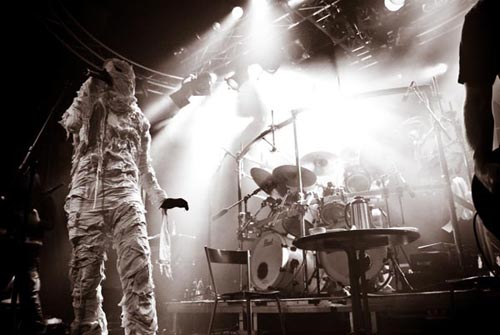
Attila Csihar live with Mayhem at Hole in the Sky 2007

The band's fourth full-length album, Ordo ad Chao (Latin for "Order to Chaos"), was released in April 2007. Ordo ad Chao featured a much rawer sound compared to the band's recent work; the drums were not equalized, and the mix was notably bass-heavy, deviating from black metal conventions. The album continued the band's experimentation with unorthodox song structures, highlighted by "Illuminate Eliminate," which, at 9:40, is the band's second longest track (behind Grand Declaration of War's "Completion in Science of Agony (Part I)" at 9:44). The album received strong reviews and became the band's highest-charting release, peaking at No. 12 on the Norwegian charts. In early 2008, Ordo Ad Chao won a Spellemannprisen, an award from Norway's largest and oldest music awards show, for one of the best Metal Album of 2007.

=== 2008–2015: Blasphemer's departure and Esoteric Warfare ===
In April 2008, Blasphemer announced his intention to leave the band, citing a lack of desire to continue despite his satisfaction with their achievements. He played several European festival dates over the following months, with his final performance with the group occurring in August. Subsequently, he continued his work with the Portuguese band Ava Inferi.

A few weeks after their last performances with Blasphemer, statements regarding imminent touring plans were posted on the band's website. In October 2008, Krister Dreyer ("Morfeus") of Dimension F3H and Limbonic Art joined the group as the touring guitarist for their upcoming South America Fucking Armageddon tour. The band toured with this lineup through late 2008 and 2009 before announcing Summer 2009 dates with French musician Silmaeth as a second touring guitarist. In November 2009, the band was arrested in Tilburg, Netherlands, for vandalizing a hotel room while on tour. Norwegian guitarist Teloch of Nidingr replaced Silmaeth, while British guitarist Charles Hedger (aka Ghul) of Imperial Vengeance took over for Morfeus in 2011 and 2012.

In a 2012 interview, Necrobutcher revealed that Mayhem had commenced work on their fifth studio album. By November 2013, the new album was in the mixing stage, with an expected release date in early 2014. Several months later, on 18 February 2014, it was announced that Mayhem would release a new album in May 2014, with a new song titled "Psywar" made available for streaming.

On 20 February 2014, the band's record label, Season of Mist, announced that the new album Esoteric Warfare would be released worldwide on 27 May 2014. This marked Mayhem's first studio effort since Blasphemer's departure and Teloch's subsequent permanent status in the band.

In January 2015, Mayhem, Watain, and Revenge performed together as part of the "Black Metal Warfare" tour in the United States. Mayhem and Watain toured again in the United States in November 2015, joined by Rotting Christ for "Part II" of the previous tour.

=== 2016–2020: Live album, Lords of Chaos film and Daemon ===
A live recording of De Mysteriis Dom Sathanas (DMDS Alive) was released in 2016.

Later that year, a film about the band, Lords of Chaos (based on the book of the same name), premiered at the Sundance Film Festival, directed by Jonas Åkerlund, further propelling the group into the media spotlight. While the film received mixed reviews from both critics and fans, band members Necrobutcher and Csihar strongly objected to the movie, despite initially granting the rights to use the band's songs. In several interviews, the two argued that the film presented a one-sided perspective of the story, particularly criticizing its failure to depict the deteriorating relationship between Euronymous and Dead in the year leading up to the latter's suicide in April 1991.

The band toured North America with Immolation and Black Anvil as support in the fall of 2017. In 2018, the band released a remixed and remastered version of A Grand Declaration of War.

Mayhem's sixth studio album, Daemon, was released on 25 October 2019 through Century Media Records. Three singles—Worthless Abominations Destroyed, Of Worms and Ruins, and Falsified and Hated—were released in advance of the album. The album is characterized by a return to the more traditional style of black metal reminiscent of De Mysteriis, containing 10 new songs along with two bonus tracks and several covers, including a tribute to Dead's former band Morbid. A music video for "Falsified and Hated" was released on 7 November and features imagery of what appears to be a shaking tent ritual, including a scene of a heart being cut open. Ziggy Jonas Rasmusson, a graffiti artist, contributed to the design.

In 2020, it was announced that drummer Tony Laureano would temporarily fill in for Hellhammer on the Decibel Magazine Tour due to Hellhammer suffering from a shoulder injury. However, the tour was ultimately canceled due to the COVID-19 pandemic.

=== 2021–present: Atavistic Black Disorder / Kommando and Liturgy of Death ===
In 2021, Mayhem was inducted into the Rockheim Hall of Fame, marking their third nomination earlier that same year. As of 2021, they are the only black metal group to receive this honor.

Mayhem announced the release of a new EP, Atavistic Black Disorder / Kommando, on 9 July 2021. The track listing includes three outtakes from the Daemon sessions, two of which were featured as bonus tracks on the deluxe edition of the album, along with four cover songs from punk rock bands (Discharge, Dead Kennedys, Rudimentary Peni and Ramones) that the group cites as having "laid the foundation for what was to come." The EP features guest appearances by former vocalists Messiah and Maniac on one cover track each. This marks the first studio recordings for Messiah and Maniac with the band since 1987's Deathcrush and 2004's Chimera, respectively. Necrobutcher stated that the two former vocalists were brought in "because of their obvious connection with punk."

Mayhem also announced a 2022 United States tour, titled The Sanguine Sodomy of North America, which began on 7 March with a show in San Francisco, California, and was projected to conclude on 3 April after a performance in Joliet, Illinois. However, on 4 March, Watain announced that they would not be able to participate in the tour due to a United States embassy "decid[ing] to launch an additional, undisclosed 'administrative process' in relation to [their] visa applications."

In the fall of 2023, Mayhem supported Cannibal Corpse on their tour of North America along with Blood Incantation and Gorguts.

On 15 September 2023 Mayhem released a live album, Daemonic Rites, consisting of live recordings from various cities recorded during their 2022 and 2023 shows.

On 4 November 2025 Mayhem announced their seventh full-length studio album, Liturgy of Death, coupled with the release of the lead single "Weep for Nothing" on the same day. The second single, titled "Despair," was released on 2 December. A third single, "Life Is a Corpse You Drag," came out on 9 January 2026 and will appear as a bonus track on the Limited Edition CD, along with the track "Sancta Mendacia". The album was released on 6 February 2026 to generally positive reviews. The band will tour in support of the album between 5 February and 26 June 2026 on the Death Over Europe Tour with Marduk and Immolation.

== Band members ==
Only members with articles included. For complete list see: List of Mayhem band members.

Current

- Necrobutcher – bass (1984–1991, 1995–present), vocals (1984–1986)
- Hellhammer – drums (1988–1993, 1995–present)
- Attila Csihar – vocals (1993, 2004–present)
- Teloch – guitars (2011–present)
- Ghul – guitars (2012–present)

Former

- Euronymous – guitars (1984–1993; his death)
- Maniac – vocals (1986–1987, 1995–2004)
- Dead – vocals (1988–1991; his death)
- Count Grishnackh – bass (1992–1993)
- Blasphemer – guitars (1995–2008)

== Discography ==
Studio albums

- De Mysteriis Dom Sathanas (1994)
- Grand Declaration of War (2000)
- Chimera (2004)
- Ordo ad Chao (2007)
- Esoteric Warfare (2014)
- Daemon (2019)
- Liturgy of Death (2026)

== Videography ==
- Live in Ski (1986)
- Home-made rehearsal with Dead (1988)
- Live in Sarpsborg (1990)
- Live in Jessheim (1990)
- Live in Bischofswerda (1998)
- European Legions: Live in Marseille 2000 (2001)
- Mayhem – Cult of Aggression (Norwegian/Swedish documentary by Stefan Rydehed) (2002)
- Live at Wacken (2004)
- Appearance in Metal: A Headbanger's Journey (2005)
- Appearance in BBC One World episode Death Metal Murders (2005)
- Once Upon a Time in Norway – The History of Mayhem and the Rise of Norwegian Black Metal (2008)
- Pure Fucking Mayhem (English documentary by Stefan Rydehed) (2008)
- Until the Light Takes Us (American documentary by Aaron Aites/Audrey Ewell) (2008)
- De Mysteriis Dom Sathanas Alive (2016)

== Awards and nominations ==
Year	Award	Nominee / work	Category	Result
2007	Alarmprisen awards	Ordo ad Chao	Metal Album of the Year	Nominated
2007	Spellemannprisen awards	Ordo ad Chao	Metal Album of the Year	Won
2021	Spellemannprisen awards	Mayhem	Honorary Award (Grand Prize)	Won
