= Lords of Chaos =

Lords of Chaos may refer to:

- Lords of Chaos (book), a 1998 book by Michael J. Moynihan and Didrik Søderlind
  - Lords of Chaos (film), a 2018 film adaptation of the above book
- Lords of Chaos (criminal group), a self-styled teen militia
- Lords of Chaos (video game), a 1990 video game
- "Lords of Chaos", a song by Magnum from the 1978 album Kingdom of Madness
- "Lords of Chaos", a song by Job for a Cowboy from the 2009 album Ruination

== See also ==
- Lords of Chaos and Order, a fictional group from DC Comics
- Lord of Chaos, a 1994 novel by Robert Jordan
- "Lord of Chaos", a song by Ken Carson from More Chaos
