= Kråkstad =

Village and former municipality in Akershus, Norway

- Village and Former municipality
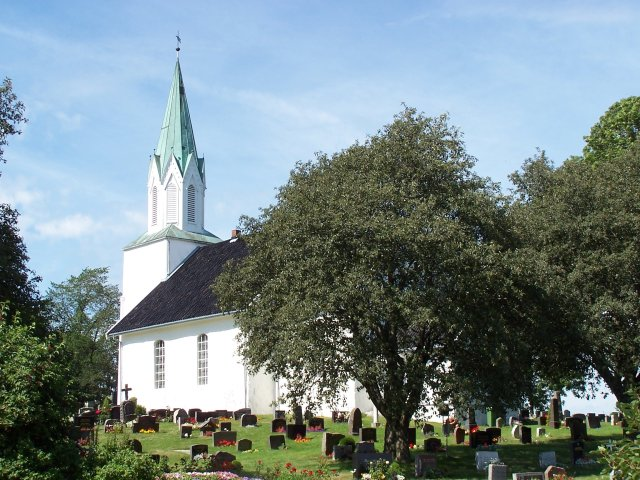
- Kråkstad Church

- Location in Akershus Kråkstad (Norway)
- Coordinates: 59°41′N 10°53′E
- Country: Norway
- Region: Austlandet
- County: Akershus
- Municipality: Nordre Follo
- Time zone: UTC+01:00 (CET)
  - Summer (DST): UTC+02:00 (CEST)

Kråkstad is a village and former municipality located in Nordre Follo municipality in Akershus, Norway.

== Overview ==
The parish of Kraakstad was established as a municipality January 1, 1838 (see formannskapsdistrikt). Ski was separated from Kråkstad July 1, 1931 - and the rest of Kråkstad was merged with Ski January 1, 1964.

The village has 839 inhabitants (2006), and a train station on Indre Østfoldbanen. The Norwegian footballer Martin Andresen grew up in this village.

== Mayhem ==
Members of the black metal band Mayhem lived in a house near the village in the early 1990s, and became infamous when vocalist Dead committed suicide inside the house on 8 April 1991 by slitting his wrists and neck and then shooting himself in the forehead with a shotgun. Guitarist Euronymous then took photographs of Dead's corpse, one of which became the cover of their Dawn of the Black Hearts album. Dead's suicide was said to cause "a change in mentality" in the black metal scene and was the first in a string of infamous events carried out by its members.

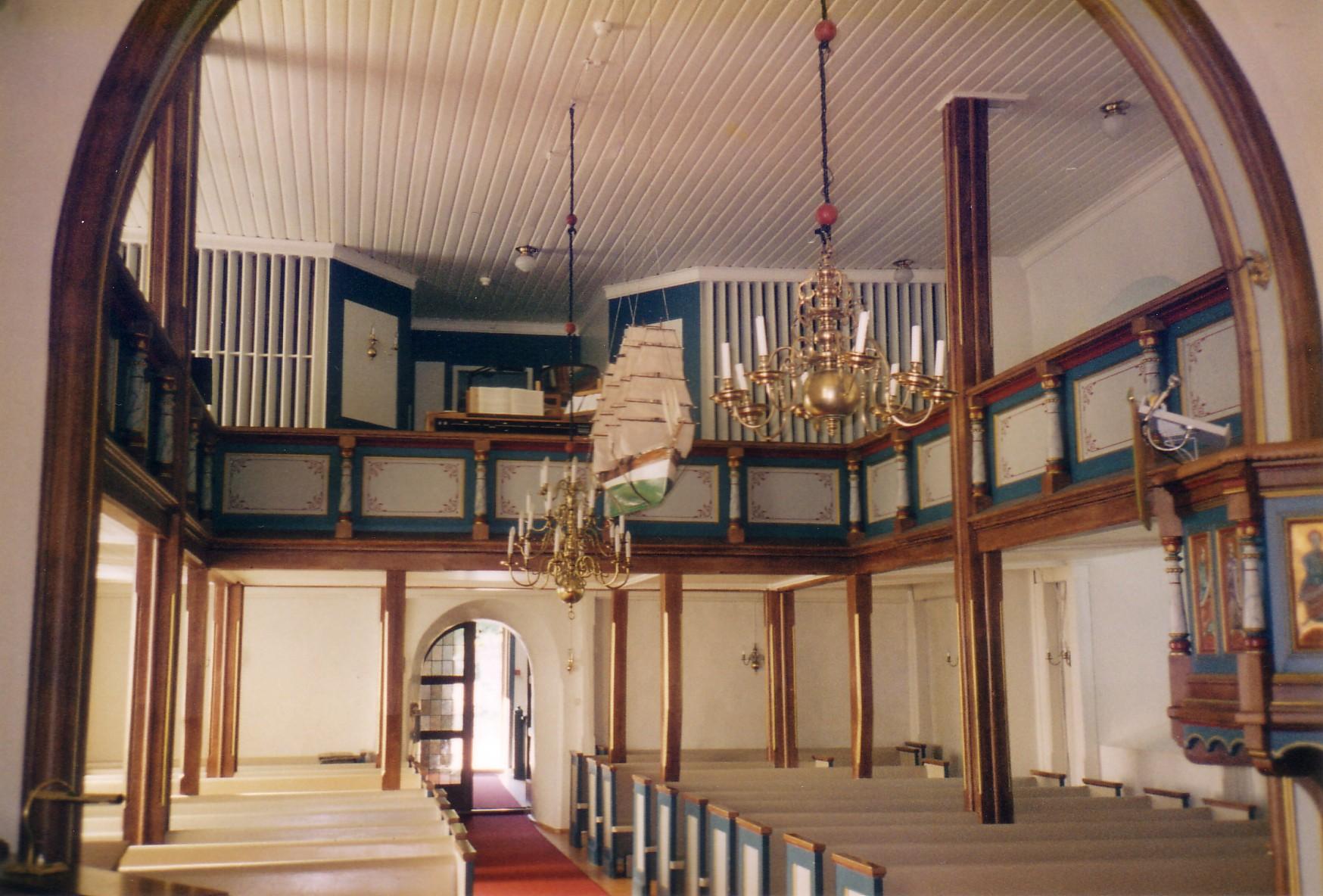
J. H. Jørgensen organ (1943)

== Kråkstad Church ==
Kråkstad Church (Kråkstad Kirke) is a parish church with its origins in the mid-1100s and has 200 seats. It was dedicated on 29 January to Saints Peter and Paul. The medieval church has a roughly square nave and narrow, short chorus. The structure is built from stones of uniform size and good cleavage. After a lightning strike and fire in 1801, only the walls remained and were badly damaged. The church was rebuilt with internal walls of smooth plaster. The timbered west tower was also built in 1882 with two bells which were recast after the fire of 1801. Apart from parts of the altarpiece, most of the interior decor is from 1882. The church organ is from J. H. Jørgensen and dated to 1943.

There are some remains of an old hillfort in the forest above Vientjern (a small lake), a few kilometers outside Kråkstad.

== Etymology ==
The municipality (originally the parish) was named after the old farm Kråkstad (Norse Krákustaðir), since the first church was built there. The first element is an old river name (*Kráka), referring to the crow; the last element is staðir (homestead, farm). Until 1921 the name was written Kraakstad.
