= Until the Light Takes Us =

2008 film by Aaron Aites

- Theatrical release poster
- Directed by: Aaron Aites; Audrey Ewell
- Produced by: Aaron Aites; Tyler Brodie; Audrey Ewell; Gill Holland; Frederick Howard
- Starring: Gylve "Fenriz" Nagell; Varg "Count Grishnackh" Vikernes; Jan Axel "Hellhammer" Blomberg; Kjetil-Vidar "Frost" Haraldstad; Harmony Korine; Bjarne Melgaard; Kristoffer "Garm" Rygg; Bård "Faust" Eithun
- Cinematography: Audrey Ewell; Odd Reinhardt Nicolaysen
- Edited by: Andrew Ford
- Production companies: Artists Public Domain; Field Pictures; The Group Entertainment
- Distributed by: Variance Films
- Release dates: October 31, 2008 (AFI Film Festival); December 4, 2009 (United States)
- Running time: 93 minutes
- Country: United States
- Language: English

Until the Light Takes Us is a 2008 American documentary film about early Norwegian black metal, directed by Aaron Aites and Audrey Ewell. The film premiered at the AFI Film Festival in 2008, a year before it was released in theaters.

== Featured interviewees ==
- Gylve "Fenriz" Nagell (Darkthrone)
- Varg "Count Grishnackh" Vikernes (Burzum, Mayhem)
- Jan Axel "Hellhammer" Blomberg (Mayhem)
- Olve "Abbath" Eikemo (Immortal)
- Harald "Demonaz" Nævdal (Immortal)
- Bjarne Melgaard (visual artist)
- Kristoffer "Garm" Rygg (Ulver, Arcturus)
- Kjetil "Frost" Haraldstad (Satyricon, 1349, Keep of Kalessin)
- Bård "Faust" Eithun (Emperor) – Eithun chose to appear as a silhouette, with his voice distorted

Archival footage

- Øystein "Euronymous" Aarseth (died in 1993) (Mayhem)
- Per "Dead" Ohlin (died in 1991) (Mayhem)
- Snorre "Blackthorn" Ruch (Thorns, Mayhem)

== Release ==
Variance Films acquired the theatrical rights to the film in the U.S. and released it in New York City on December 4, 2009. The film grossed $7,246 on a single screen in its first week, the second highest per-screen gross of any debuting film at the time (behind Up in the Air).

=== Reception ===
Until the Light Takes Us received a 54 out of 100 score on Metacritic and a 46% approval rating on Rotten Tomatoes.

Andrew O'Hehir of Salon.com called the film "crafty and compelling". Nick Pinkerton of The Village Voice wrote, "The filmmakers seem cowed into obeisance by their subjects. Varg's last onscreen appearance is accompanied by a montage fitting a schoolyard crush, and the film's title is the translation of Burzum's fourth album, Hvis lyset tar oss. [...] [the film] arrives a decade too late to add much."

== See also ==
- Lords of Chaos: The Bloody Rise of the Satanic Metal Underground brings into focus the church burning and murders that occurred around 1993.
- Lords of Chaos, a dramatization of some events in the Norwegian black metal scene.
- Metal: A Headbanger's Journey, a documentary film discussing the traits and originators of some of metal's many subgenres, including Norwegian black metal.
