= Early Norwegian black metal scene =

Norwegian music scene

Norwegian black metal
- Stylistic origins: First-wave black metal, punk rock, Berlin school, gothic rock
- Cultural origins: Early 1990s, Norway

Subgenres
- Symphonic black metal

Other topics
- List of musicians

The early Norwegian black metal scene of the 1990s is credited with shaping the modern black metal genre and producing some of the most acclaimed and influential artists in extreme metal.

The scene had a distinct ethos, and its core members referred to themselves as "The Black Circle" or "Black Metal Inner Circle." This group consisted of men who congregated at the record shop Helvete ("Hell") in Oslo. In interviews, they expressed anti-Christian and misanthropic views, presenting themselves as a cult-like group of militant Satanists intent on spreading terror, hatred, and evil. They adopted pseudonyms and appeared in photographs adorned with "corpse paint" and wielding medieval weaponry. The scene was exclusive, creating boundaries around itself and incorporating only those it deemed "true" or committed. Musical integrity was paramount, and artists sought to maintain black metal's underground status.

In August 1993, several of its members were arrested, and in May 1994, they were convicted of arson, murder, assault, and possession of explosives, most notably Varg Vikernes for the murder of Euronymous. Most showed no remorse for their actions at the time. Some Norwegian media referred to them as "Satanic terrorists," and one Norwegian TV channel interviewed a woman who claimed that Satanists had sacrificed her child and killed her dog. The early Norwegian black metal scene has since been the subject of numerous books and documentaries.

== Ideology ==
The Norwegian black metal scene was vehemently opposed to Christianity and organized religion as a whole. In interviews during the early 1990s, Euronymous and other members of the scene portrayed themselves as militant misanthropic devil worshippers who sought to spread hatred, sorrow, and evil. They criticized the Church of Satan for being too "humane." The theistic Satanism they advocated was an inversion of Christianity. Euronymous was the key figure behind this ideology. He professed to support totalitarianism and to oppose compassion, peace, happiness, and fun. When asked why such statements were made to the press, Ihsahn of Emperor stated, "I think that was very much to create fear among people." He added that the scene "wanted to be in opposition to society" and "tried to concentrate more on just being 'evil' than having a real Satanic philosophy." Vikernes claimed that the reason they professed to advocate "evil" was to provoke.

According to the book Lords of Chaos, many who knew Euronymous claim that "the extreme Satanic image he projected was, in fact, just that – a projection which bore little resemblance to his real personality." Those making this assertion include Necrobutcher, Kjetil Manheim, Vikernes, and Blackthorn (the latter two were convicted for his murder). Faust stated that with Euronymous, "there was a lot of smoke but not so much fire." Mortiis, however, asserted that Euronymous "was such a devil worshipper you wouldn't believe it," while Metalion, who had known Euronymous since 1985 and considered him his best friend, remarked that Euronymous "was always telling what he thought... worshipping death and being extreme." Regarding other members of the scene, Samuel Fridh suggests that there is no evidence to support their early claims of being devil worshippers, and Leif A. Lier, who led the police investigation following Euronymous's death, stated that he and his team had not encountered a single Satanist. Faust remarked that "for some people it [Satanism] was bloody serious, but to a lot of them it was all a big hype."

In retrospect, Metalion reflected, "In the past, people just wrote about Satan, but now people meant it. I believe it was serious—maybe not all the Satanism, but definitely the approach to the music and the lifestyle. It was certainly more destructive than metal had been in the past." Tenebris from the Misanthropic Luciferian Order, a Swedish Satanic order, noted that the Norwegian scene "meant a lot as long as it lasted. Back then, in 1991, things mainly concerned black metal and ideological Satanism (not so much practical Satanism, but anyway...)... It grew quickly to become a sort of black metal army... and kind of stood and fell with Euronymous and his shop. Therefore, it vanished with his death in '93... Sadly enough, many people involved at the time betrayed their ideals and lost their interest when things fell apart. Like it was nothing more than a hype of temporary nature."

Regarding the term "black metal," Euronymous stated that it applies to any heavy metal band that identifies as theistic Satanists and writes Satanic lyrics. Such notions were echoed by other members of the scene, including Faust. At the time, bands with a style akin to Norwegian black metal but lacking Satanic lyrics tended to use alternative terms to describe their music.

Some bands within the scene were intrigued by pre-Christian Norway and its traditions, and there was an undercurrent of romantic nationalism present. Additionally, some scene members engaged with Nazi imagery, primarily as a means of provocation. In a private letter written in the early 1990s, Euronymous asserted that "almost all" Norwegian black metal bands at the time were "more or less Nazis." He expressed an interest in totalitarian communist states, claiming he wished to see people "rot under communist dictatorship."

== Origins ==
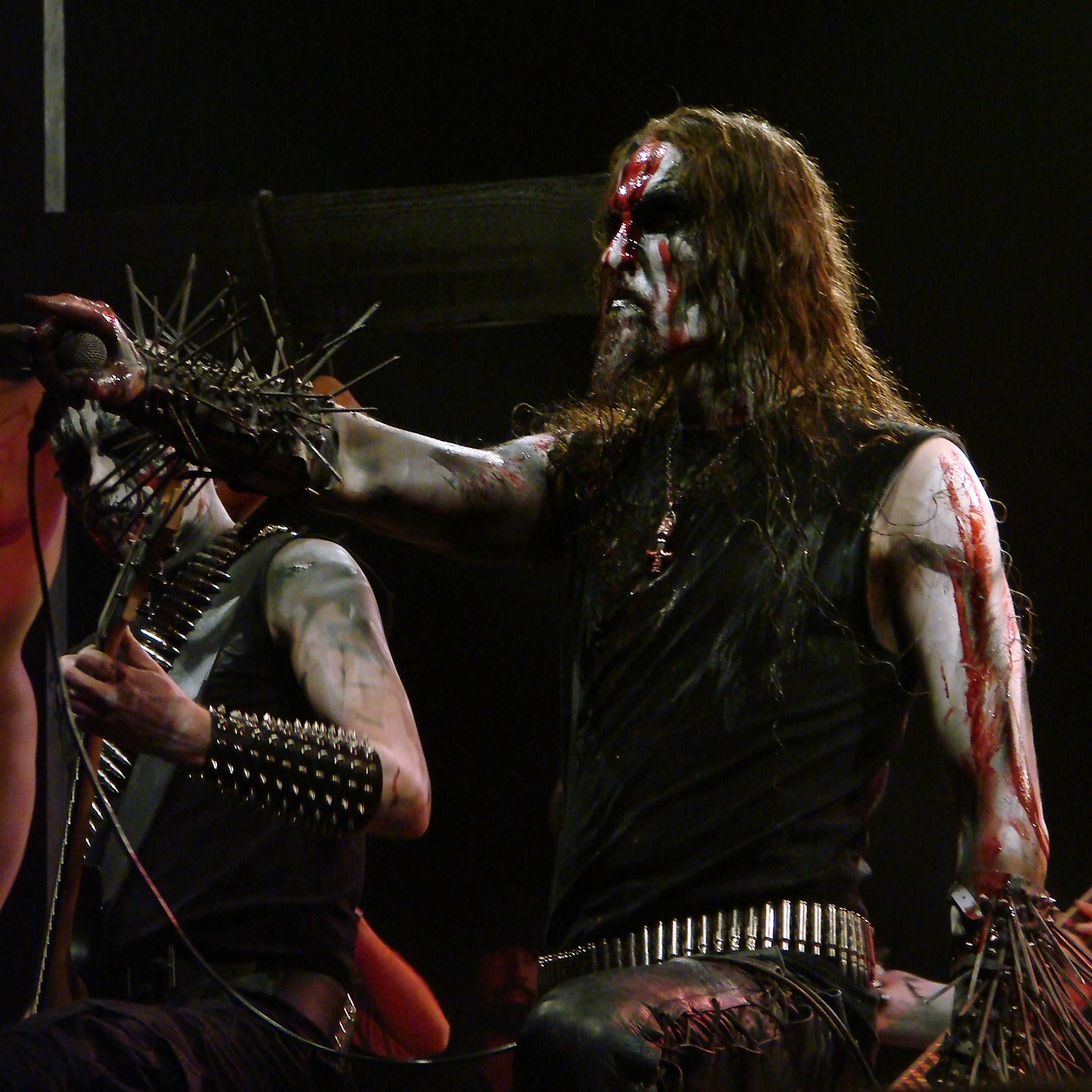
Norwegian black metal singer Gaahl wearing corpse paint

During the 1980s, black metal was a loose collective of a few heavy metal bands that shared Satanic lyrics; however, most of the "first wave" bands employed Satanism primarily for shock value.

Mayhem's debut EP Deathcrush (1987) was one of the most influential releases from the first wave of black metal, largely founding the early Norwegian black metal scene. The band drew on the influence of the first wave of black metal such as Hellhammer, Venom and Bathory, the punk of Amebix, GBH, Discharge and the Misfits, as well as more experimental groups like Tangerine Dream and Pink Floyd. In the book Lords of Chaos, Mayhem were credited as the band who combined the influence of the disparate styles of black metal's first wave and created the style that is understood as black metal today.

In 1988, the band hired vocalist Per "Dead" Ohlin of the Swedish band Morbid. Dead wore corpse paint, black and white makeup meant to achieve a ghastly appearance. According to Mayhem bassist Necrobutcher, "it wasn't anything to do with the way Kiss and Alice Cooper used makeup. Dead actually wanted to look like a corpse. He didn't do it to look cool." This would go on to become a hallmark of the Norwegian black metal scene. Dead would also bury his stage clothes and dig them up to wear on concert nights.

Other first wave Norwegian black metal bands included Old Funeral (formed in 1988), Stigma Diabolicum (formed in 1989 and later changed their name to Thorns) and Mortem (formed in 1989). Mayhem guitarist Øystein "Euronymous" Aarseth and Snorre "Blackthorn" Ruch of Thorns developed a style of riffing where guitarists played full chords utilising all the strings of the guitar instead of relying on power chords, which typically use only two or three strings, which would become a key element of the subsequent waves of black metal.

== Dead's suicide ==
On 8 April 1991, Mayhem vocalist and lyricist Per Yngve Ohlin, known by the stage name "Dead," committed suicide with a shotgun while alone in a house shared by the band. Fellow musicians described Dead as odd, introverted, and depressed. For performances, he made himself look like a corpse and engaged in self-harm while performing. Dead was discovered by Mayhem guitarist Euronymous with his wrists and throat slit and a gunshot wound to his forehead. Before calling the police, Euronymous took a camera and photographed the body after rearranging some items. One of these photographs was later used as the cover of a bootleg live album: Dawn of the Black Hearts.

Euronymous exploited Dead's suicide to enhance Mayhem's "evil" image, claiming that Dead had killed himself because black metal had become "trendy" and commercialized. He created necklaces purportedly made from fragments of Dead's skull and distributed them to musicians he considered worthy. Metal Hammer writer Enrico Ahlig cited the notoriety of the event as beginning the second wave of black metal. Mayhem bassist Jørn 'Necrobutcher' Stubberud noted, "people became more aware of the black metal scene after Dead had shot himself [...]; I think it was Dead's suicide that really changed the scene." The suicide caused a rift between Euronymous and some of his friends, particularly Necrobutcher, who were disgusted by his attitude towards Dead. Some claimed Euronymous "went into a fantasy world" and "tried to be as extreme as he had talked about."

The months following the event saw the formation of Norwegian black metal bands Arcturus, Burzum, Carpathian Forest, Emperor, Enslaved, Immortal, Mysticum, Satyricon, Hades Almighty and Gorgoroth. Many of the musicians in these acts had previously been members of death metal bands, while other bands such as Darkthrone instead changed their sound from death metal to black metal.

Two other members of the scene would later commit suicide: Erik 'Grim' Brødreskift (of Immortal, Borknagar, Gorgoroth) in 1999 and Espen 'Storm' Andersen (of Strid) in 2001.

== Helvete and the "Black Circle" ==
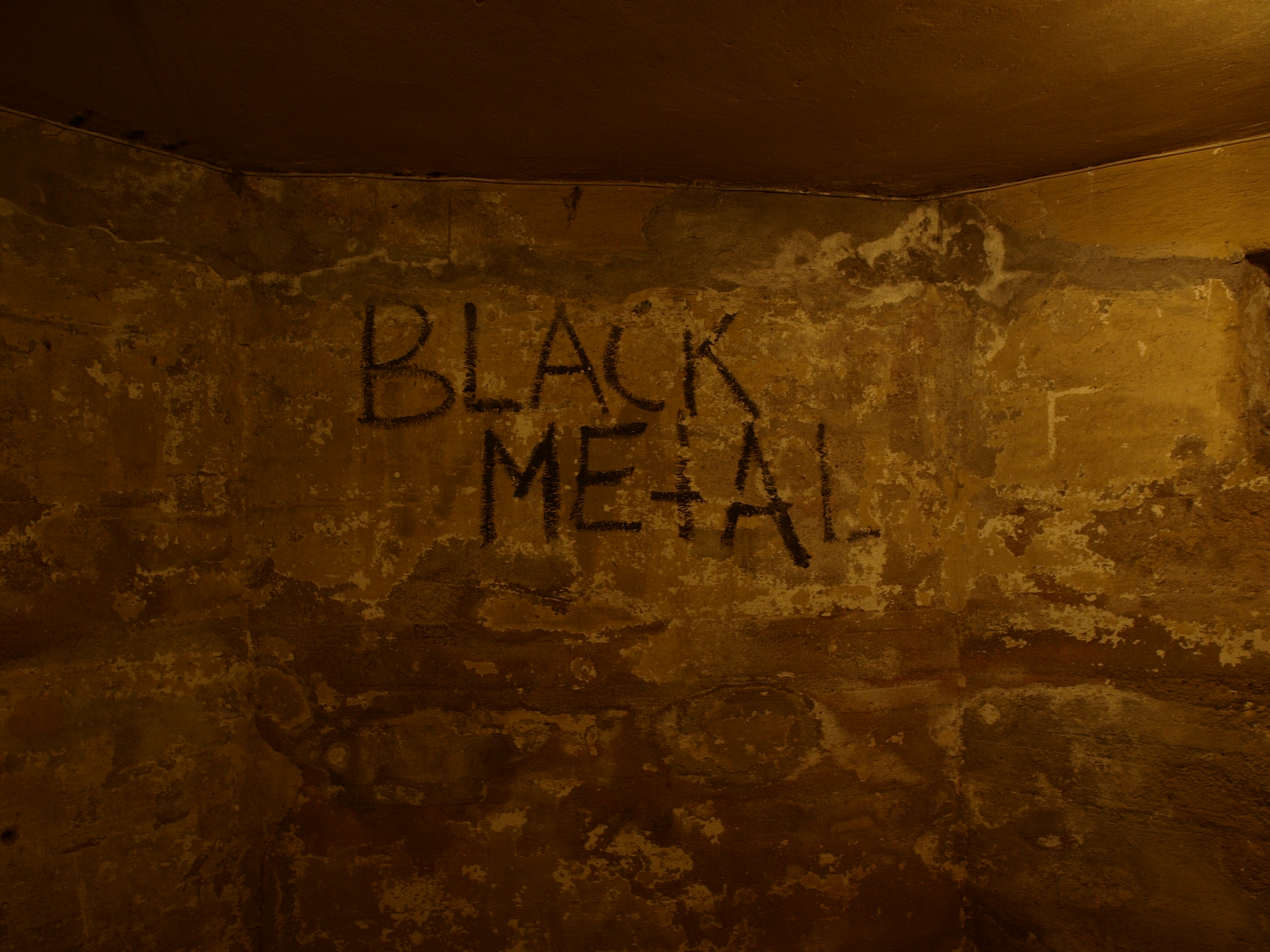
The basement of Helvete

Mayhem guitarist Euronymous was "the central figure involved in the formation of the Norwegian black metal scene," which he "almost single-handedly founded." During May–June 1991, he opened a record shop called Helvete (Norwegian for "Hell"). The shop was located at Schweigaards gate 56 in Oslo. Norwegian black metal musicians often gathered at the shop and in its basement. These included members of Mayhem, members of Emperor, Varg "Count Grishnackh" Vikernes of Burzum, and "Blackthorn" of Thorns. Euronymous also established an independent record label called Deathlike Silence Productions, which was based at Helvete. This label released albums by Norwegian bands Mayhem and Burzum, Swedish bands Merciless and Abruptum, and Japanese band Sigh. Euronymous, Varg, and Emperor guitarist Tomas "Samoth" Haugen lived in the shop at various times. Emperor drummer Bård "Faust" Eithun also lived and worked there. The shop's walls were painted black and adorned with medieval weapons, posters of bands, and picture discs, while its window featured a polystyrene tombstone.

During its operation, Helvete served as the focal point of the Norwegian black metal scene. Jon "Metalion" Kristiansen, the writer of the fanzine Slayer, stated that the opening of Helvete marked "the creation of the whole Norwegian Black Metal scene." Daniel Ekeroth noted in 2008:

Within just a few months [of Helvete opening], many young musicians had become obsessed with Euronymous and his ideas, and soon a lot of Norwegian death metal bands transformed into black metal bands. Amputation became Immortal, Thou Shalt Suffer turned into Emperor, and Darkthrone swapped their Swedish-inspired death metal for primitive black metal. Most notoriously, Old Funeral's guitar player Varg Vikernes had already left the band to form his own creation, Burzum.

The individuals who gathered at Helvete have been referred to as the "Black Circle" or "Black Metal Inner Circle," a term allegedly coined by Euronymous. Euronymous portrayed the "Black Circle" as an organized, cult-like group of militant Satanists, with activities funded by his record shop. A 1993 article in Kerrang! described them as "Satanic terrorists." Faust later remarked that it was "just a name that was invented for the people who hung around the shop... there wasn't anything like members and membership cards and official meetings." Similarly, in his review of Lucifer Rising, Varg Vikernes claimed, "The so-called 'Black Circle' was something Euronymous made up because he wanted to make people believe there was such a thing, but it was nonsense and never existed. The media, on the other hand, believed it existed for a while, but quickly stopped talking about it when they understood it was a fake rumor."

According to Stian "Occultus" Johansen, the space that Euronymous rented "was far too big and the rent was too high. That's the reason why it never did well." Only a small part of the building was utilized for the shop itself. Euronymous closed Helvete in early 1993 when it began to attract the attention of the police and media. The store has since reopened under the name Neseblod Records, in the same location but with significantly less floor space. ('Neseblod' is Norwegian for 'nosebleed'.) Many of the original artifacts still remain, and the store also identifies as a "black metal museum."

The site was damaged by fire on 9 April 2024, resulting in the evacuation of nearby residences.

== Church arsons and attempts ==
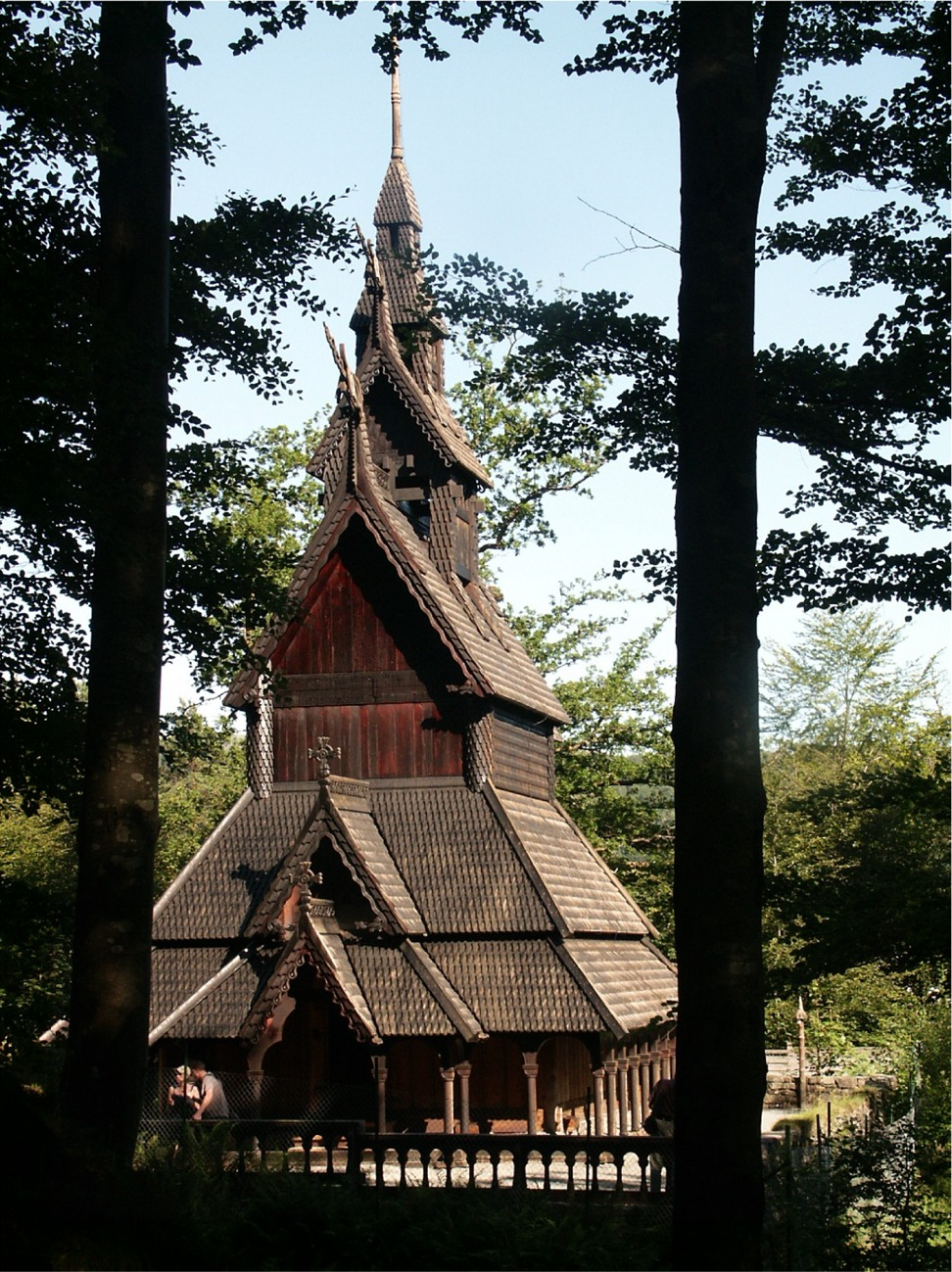
The Fantoft Stave Church, restored in 1997.

In 1992, members of the Norwegian black metal scene initiated a wave of arson attacks on Christian churches. By 1996, there had been at least 50 attacks in Norway; in every case that was solved, those responsible were identified as black metal fans. Some of the targeted buildings were hundreds of years old and regarded as significant historical landmarks. The first was Norway's Fantoft Stave Church, which was reduced to ashes in June 1992. Authorities believe Varg Vikernes of Burzum was responsible, and the cover of Burzum's EP Aske ("ashes") features a photograph of the destroyed church. On 16 May 1994, Vikernes was found guilty of burning down the Holmenkollen Chapel, Skjold Church, and Åsane Church. Additionally, he was convicted of an attempted arson of a fourth church and for the theft and storage of 150 kg of explosives. Members of the Swedish black metal scene began burning churches as well in 1993.

To coincide with the release of Mayhem's De Mysteriis Dom Sathanas, Vikernes and Euronymous allegedly plotted to bomb the Nidaros Cathedral, which appears on the album cover. The musicians Faust, Samoth, (both of Emperor), and Jørn Inge Tunsberg (of Hades Almighty) were also convicted of church arsons. Those convicted of church burnings expressed no remorse and described their actions as a symbolic "retaliation" against Christianity in Norway. Mayhem drummer Hellhammer stated he had called for attacks on mosques and Hindu temples, arguing that they were more foreign. Today, opinions regarding the church burnings vary within the black metal community. Many musicians, singers, and songwriters from the early Norwegian black metal scene, such as Infernus and Gaahl of Gorgoroth, continue to praise the church burnings, with the latter asserting, "there should have been more of them, and there will be more of them." Conversely, others, such as Necrobutcher and Kjetil Manheim of Mayhem and Abbath of Immortal, view the church burnings as ultimately futile. Manheim claimed that many arsons were "just people trying to gain acceptance" within the black metal scene. Watain vocalist Erik Danielsson acknowledged respect for the attacks but commented on those responsible: "the only Christianity they defeated was the last piece of Christianity within themselves. Which is a very good beginning, of course."

The following is a partial list of church arsons:

1992

- 23 May: attempted burning of Storetveit Church in Bergen Municipality.
- 6 June: burning of Fantoft Stave Church in Bergen Municipality – Varg Vikernes is strongly suspected as the culprit but was not convicted.
- 1 August: burning of Revheim Church in Stavanger Municipality.
- 21 August: burning of Holmenkollen Chapel in Oslo Municipality – Varg Vikernes and Faust were convicted for this; Euronymous also participated but was murdered in August 1993.
- 1 September: burning of Ormøya Church in Oslo Municipality.
- 13 September: burning of Skjold Church in Vindafjord Municipality – Varg Vikernes and Samoth were convicted for this.
- 3 October: burning of Hauketo Church in Oslo Municipality.
- 24 December: burning of Åsane Church in Bergen Municipality – Varg Vikernes and Jørn Inge Tunsberg were convicted for this.
- 25 December: burning of a Methodist church in Sarpsborg Municipality – a firefighter was killed while fighting this fire.

1993

- 7 February: burning of Lundby New Church in Gothenburg, Sweden.

1994

- 13 March: burning of Sund Church in Sund Municipality.
- 27 March: burning of Seegård Church in Gjøvik Municipality.
- 16 May: attempted burning of Gol Stave Church in Gol Municipality, Buskerud.
- 17 May: attempted burning of Åmodt Chapel in Buskerud.
- 4 June: burning of Frogn Church in Drøbak.
- 19 June: attempted burning of Heni Church in Gjerdrum Municipality.
- 7 July: burning of a church in Jeløy Municipality.
- 21 July: attempted burning of Odda Church in Odda Municipality.
- 13 August: attempted burning of Loop Chapel in Meldal Municipality.
- 10 December: attempted burning of Åkra Church in Karmøy Municipality.
- 22 December: attempted burning of Askim Church in Askim Municipality.
- 26 December: attempted burning of Klemetsrud Church in Oslo Municipality.

1995

- 13 May: burning of Lord Church in Telemark.
- 25 May: burning of Såner Church in Vestby Municipality.
- 14 June: burning of Moe Church in Sandefjord Municipality.
- 21 July: attempted burning of a church college in Porsgrunn Municipality.
- 3 September: attempted burning of Vågsbygd Church college in Kristiansand Municipality.
- 3 November: burning of Innset Church in Rennebu Municipality.

== Murder of Magne Andreassen ==
On 21 August 1992, Bård "Faust" Eithun murdered Magne Andreassen, a gay man, in Lillehammer. According to Faust, while walking home at night, a man made a sexual advance toward him, and Faust agreed to walk with him to the Olympic park. Once in the woods, Faust stabbed Andreassen 37 times, then proceeded to kick him in the head repeatedly as he laid on the ground.

Faust claimed that he felt no remorse at the time. In the late 1990s, he reflected on the murder, stating, "I was outside, just waiting to get out some aggression. It's not easy to describe why it happened. It was meant to happen, and if it was this man or another man, that's not really important." Ihsahn, his bandmate in Emperor, remarked that Faust "had been very fascinated by serial killers for a long time, and I guess he wanted to know what it's like to kill a person."

Initially, the police had no suspects, and Faust remained free for approximately a year. However, he confided in Euronymous, Vikernes, and a few others about his crime. The day following the stabbing, he returned to Oslo and allegedly burned down Holmenkollen Chapel with Vikernes and Euronymous. After the murder of Euronymous in August 1993, Faust was arrested and confessed to Andreassen's murder. In 1994, he was sentenced to 14 years in prison but was released in 2003.

== Bergens Tidende article ==
In January 1993, an article in one of Norway's largest newspapers, Bergens Tidende (BT), brought the black metal scene into the media spotlight. Two friends of Vikernes interviewed him and submitted the interview to the newspaper, hoping for publication. In the anonymous interview, "Count Grishnackh" (Vikernes) claimed to have burned churches and killed a man in Lillehammer. BT journalist Finn Bjørn Tønder arranged a meeting with "Count Grishnackh." The journalists were summoned to an apartment and were allegedly warned they would be shot if they called the police. There, Vikernes and his companions told the journalists that they had burned the churches or knew who had done it and warned that the attacks would continue. They claimed to be devil worshippers and stated, "Our intention is to spread fear and evil."

They provided the journalists with details about the arsons that had not yet been released to the press, prompting BT to consult with the police before publication, who confirmed these details. The article was published on 20 January as the front page of BT, headlined "Vi tente på kirkene" ("We set the churches on fire"), and included a photo of Vikernes, his face mostly obscured, holding two large knives. However, by the time the article was printed, Vikernes had already been arrested. The police allegedly tracked him down by visiting an address listed on a Burzum flyer, although Vikernes believes that Tønder betrayed him.

According to Vikernes, the anonymous interview was orchestrated by him and Euronymous with the aim of spreading fear, promoting black metal, and attracting more customers to Helvete. Vikernes remarked on the interview, "I exaggerated a lot and when the journalist left we... had a good laugh, because he didn't seem to understand that I was pulling his leg." He added that the interview disclosed nothing that could prove his involvement in any crime. Vikernes claims that, after his arrest, "the journalist edited the interview and... published an insane version of it the following day, without even letting me read through it." Some other members of the scene were also arrested and questioned, but all were released due to a lack of evidence.

Euronymous decided to close Helvete as it began to attract the attention of the police and media. Vikernes criticized Euronymous for shutting down the shop instead of capitalizing on the publicity, stating, "by doing so he also made all my efforts more or less pointless. I spent six weeks in custody because of that." Norwegian magazine Rock Furore published an interview with Vikernes in February 1993. In it, he commented on the prison system, saying, "It's much too nice here. It's not hell at all. In this country prisoners get a bed, toilet, and shower. It's completely ridiculous. I asked the police to throw me in a real dungeon, and also encouraged them to use violence." He was released in March due to a lack of evidence.

Shortly after this incident, the Oslo police dispatched its Church Fire Group to Bergen, establishing a makeshift headquarters in the Hotel Norge. According to Lords of Chaos, citing a police report, Vikernes knocked on their door and "virtually forced his way into the suite." He was "dressed in chain mail, carrying two large knives in his belt, and flanked by two young men who apparently behaved as if they were his bodyguards or henchmen." Vikernes "stated that he was fed up with being harassed by the authorities, and that the police investigation into the Black Metal scene should be stopped." When police informed him that he had no right to issue orders, Vikernes "took one step back and raised his right arm in a Roman salute."

== Murder of Euronymous ==
Murder of Euronymous
- Location: Oslo, Norway
- Date: 10 August 1993; 33 years ago
- Target: Øystein Aarseth, a.k.a. Euronymous
- Attack type: Murder by stabbing
- Deaths: 1 (Øystein "Euronymous" Aarseth, aged 25)
- Perpetrator: Kristian "Varg" Vikernes
- Motive: Unclear
- Verdict: Guilty
- Convictions: First-degree murder
- Sentence: 21 years in prison

In early 1993, tensions escalated between Euronymous and Vikernes. On the night of 10 August 1993, Vikernes and Snorre 'Blackthorn' Ruch traveled from Bergen to Euronymous' apartment in Oslo. Upon their arrival, a confrontation ensued, during which Vikernes fatally stabbed Euronymous. His body was discovered outside the apartment, bearing 23 stab wounds—two to the head, five to the neck, and 16 to the back.

Speculation surrounding the murder suggests it stemmed from a power struggle, a financial dispute over Burzum records, or an attempt to "outdo" a previous stabbing incident in Lillehammer. Vikernes, however, refutes these claims, asserting he killed Euronymous in self-defense. He contends that Euronymous had devised a plan to incapacitate him with an electroshock weapon, bind him, and torture him to death while filming the event, using a meeting regarding an unsigned contract as a ruse to ambush him. Vikernes claims he intended to present Euronymous with the signed contract that night and "tell him to fuck off," but that Euronymous panicked and attacked him first. According to Vikernes, the altercation began when Euronymous kicked him in the chest, after which a scuffle ensued and Euronymous attempted to obtain a knife from the kitchen and Vikernes used his own knife to attack Euronymous in self-defense. Vikernes has also claimed that Euronymous's initial injuries happened because he broke a lamp and, as a result "he was swimming in glass fragments with only his underwear, so he was rather bloody".

Faust expressed skepticism regarding the self-defense narrative, while Necrobutcher believes Vikernes killed Euronymous due to the frequent death threats Euronymous made to Vikernes and others. Necrobutcher later claimed that he had also intended to murder Euronymous himself due to his tasteless exploitation of Dead's suicide.

Vikernes was apprehended on 19 August 1993, and many other individuals within the scene were questioned around the same time. Some confessed to their crimes and implicated others. In May 1994, Vikernes was sentenced to 21 years in prison (Norway's maximum penalty) for the murder of Euronymous, the arson of four churches, and possession of 150 kg of explosives. Two churches were set ablaze on the day he was sentenced, "presumably as a statement of symbolic support." Blackthorn received an eight-year prison sentence for his role as an accomplice in the murder. That month saw the release of the Mayhem album De Mysteriis Dom Sathanas, featuring Euronymous on guitar and Vikernes on bass guitar. Euronymous's family had requested that Mayhem's drummer, Hellhammer, remove the bass tracks recorded by Vikernes, but Hellhammer stated, "I thought it was appropriate that the murderer and victim were on the same record." Vikernes was released from prison in 2009.

== Conflict with other music scenes ==
A strong rivalry existed between the Norwegian black metal and Swedish death metal scenes. Fenriz and Tchort noted that Norwegian black metal musicians had become "fed up with the whole death metal scene" and that "death metal was very uncool in Oslo" at that time. On multiple occasions, Euronymous sent death threats to some of the more 'mainstream' death metal bands in Europe. Allegedly, a group of Norwegian black metal fans even plotted to kidnap and murder certain Swedish death metal musicians.

Rivalry also emerged between Norwegian and Finnish black metal bands. Impaled Nazarene printed "No orders from Norway accepted" and "Kuolema Norjan kusipäille!" (Death to the arseholes of Norway!) on early pressings of their first album, while innuendos and snarky comments were exchanged in fanzines. Beherit's vocalist, Nuclear Holocausto, utilized the rivalry to execute a series of telephone pranks on Mika Luttinen (of Impaled Nazarene), during which he would call him in the dead of night and play nursery rhymes at high speed on a cassette recorder. At that time, Luttinen claimed that the messages were threats from Norwegian black metallers. The Finnish band Black Crucifixion criticized the Norwegian band Darkthrone as "trendies" because Darkthrone had originally been a death metal band before transitioning to black metal.

== List of music releases ==
The following is a partial list of notable black metal recordings and releases by the aforementioned bands released during 1987–1993. Releases in bold are albums, while the rest are demos and extended plays.

| Date | Band | Title | Notes |
|---|---|---|---|
| March 1987 | Mayhem | Deathcrush | recorded in February/March 1987 at Creative Studios and released in August 1987 |
| December 1989 | Stigma Diabolicum | Luna De Nocturnus | |
| March 1990 | Stigma Diabolicum | Lacus De Luna | |
| April 1990 | Mayhem | Freezing Moon and Carnage | these songs feature Dead as vocalist and appeared on the 1991 Projections of a Stained Mind compilation |
| November 1990 | Mayhem | Live in Leipzig | recorded live on 26 November 1990 but not released officially until July 1993 |
| | | **1991** | |
| March 1991 | Arcturus | My Angel | recorded in March 1991 at Studio S and released in July 1991 |
| April 1991 | Thou Shalt Suffer | Open the Mysteries of Your Creation | recorded in April 1991 at Notodden Lydstudio and released in July 1991 |
| June 1991 | Thorns | Grymyrk | recorded on 3 June 1991 |
| July 1991 | Enthrone | Black Winds | |
| July 1991 | Burzum | Burzum Demo I | |
| August 1991 | Darkthrone | **A Blaze in the Northern Sky** | recorded in August 1991 at Creative Studios but not released until February 1992 |
| October 1991 | Immortal | Immortal | |
| October 1991 | Thou Shalt Suffer | Into the Woods of Belial | recorded in October 1991 at Notodden Lydstudio |
| November 1991 | Burzum | Burzum Demo II | |
| December 1991 | Enslaved | Nema | recorded on 6–7 December 1991 at Slakten Lydstudio |
| 1991 | Malfeitor | Malfeitor | |
| | | **1992** | |
| January 1992 | Burzum | **Burzum** | recorded in January 1992 at Grieghallen Studio and released in March 1992 |
| February 1992 | Ildjarn | Unknown Truths | |
| April 1992 | Beelzebub | Apotheosis | recorded on 4–5 April 1992 at SIFA Lydstudio |
| April 1992 | Burzum | **Det som engang var** | recorded in April 1992 at Grieghallen Studio but not released until August 1993 |
| April 1992 | Immortal | **Diabolical Fullmoon Mysticism** | recorded in April 1992 at Grieghallen Studio and released in July 1992 |
| May 1992 | Emperor | Wrath of the Tyrant | recorded on 8–11 May 1992 |
| June 1992 | Satyricon | All Evil | recorded on 21–22 June 1992 |
| June 1992 | Enslaved | Yggdrasill | recorded on 28–29 June 1992 at Micro Music |
| June 1992 | Darkthrone | **Under a Funeral Moon** | recorded in June 1992 at Creative Studios but not released until June 1993 |
| August 1992 | Burzum | Aske | recorded in August 1992 at Grieghallen Studio but not released until March 1993 |
| September 1992 | Carpathian Forest | Bloodlust & Perversion | recorded in September 1992 at Star Studio |
| September 1992 | Burzum | **Hvis lyset tar oss** | recorded in September 1992 at Grieghallen Studio but not released until April 1994 |
| September 1992 – sometime in 1993 | Mayhem | **De Mysteriis Dom Sathanas** | recorded in September 1992 (Vocals in 1993) at Grieghallen Studio but not released until May 1994 |
| October 1992 | Enslaved | Hordanes Land | recorded in September–October 1992 at Lydloftet and released in May 1993 |
| December 1992 | Fimbulwinter | Rehearsal Demo | recorded in October–December 1992, re-released as a full-length album, Servants of Sorcery, in 1994 |
| December 1992 | Emperor | Emperor; As the Shadows Rise | recorded together in December 1992 but released separately in May 1993 and August 1994 respectively |
| December 1992 | Sabazios | Wintermass | recorded in December 1992 at Rolf's Cellar and released in January 1993 |
| 1992 | Thorns | Trøndertun | |
| 1992 | Malfeitor | Pandemonium | |
| 1992 | Incarnator | Nordic Holocaust | |
| 1992 | Ice Wind | The Call of the Ice Wind | |
| 1992 | Massemord | Efest | recorded in fall 1992 and released on 1 June 1993 |
| | | **1993** | |
| January 1993 | Ildjarn | Ildjarn | |
| January 1993 | Storm | Wintermoon | recorded in January 1993 |
| February 1993 | In the Woods ... | Rehearsal / Demo 02.93 | recorded in February 1993 and released in March 1993 |
| March 1993 | Burzum | **Filosofem** | recorded in March 1993 at Grieghallen Studio but not released until January 1996 |
| March 1993 | Necrohell | Necrohell | recorded in March 1993 |
| April 1993 | Darkthrone | **Transilvanian Hunger** | recorded in April 1993 at Creative Studios |
| May 1993 | Nehemah | Wages of Sin | recorded in May 1993 |
| June 1993 | Darkthrone | **Under a Funeral Moon** | recorded in June 1992 but not released until June 1993 |
| July 1993 | Darkthrone | Goatlord | recorded in 1993 but not released until 1996 |
| 1993 | Massemord | Doomsday | |
| 1993 | Enslaved | Hordanes Land | |
| 1993 | Fimbulwinter | Rehearsal Demo | |

== Documentaries and films ==
- Det svarte alvor (1994), aired on Norwegian TV by the Norwegian Broadcasting Corporation (NRK).
- Satan rir Media (English: Satan Rides the Media) (1999).
- Norsk Black Metal (2003), aired on Norwegian TV by the Norwegian Broadcasting Corporation (NRK).
- Metal: A Headbanger's Journey (2005) touches on black metal in the early 1990s and includes an extensive 25-minute feature on the DVD release.
- Black Metal: A Documentary (2006), produced by Bill Zebub.
- Murder Music: A History of Black Metal (2007).
- Once Upon a Time in Norway (2007).
- Pure Fucking Mayhem (2008).
- Black Metal: The Norwegian Legacy (2008), produced by Bill Zebub.
- Until the Light Takes Us (2009).
- Black Metal: The Music of Satan (2010), produced by Bill Zebub.
- Lords of Chaos (2018), directed by Jonas Åkerlund.
- Helvete – historien om norsk black metal (2020).

== See also ==
- List of musicians in the early Norwegian black metal scene
- National Socialist black metal – Subgenre of black metal promoting Nazism
- Norwegian black metal

== Bibliography ==
- Dyrendal, Asbjørn (2016). "Satanism in Norway". In Bogdan, Henrik; Hammer, Olav (eds.). Western Esotericism in Scandinavia. Brill Esotericism Reference Library. Leiden: Brill Publishers. pp. 481–488. doi:10.1163/9789004325968_062. ISBN 978-90-04-30241-9. ISSN 2468-3566.
- Introvigne, Massimo (2016). "Satan the Musician: Black Metal and Satanism". Satanism: A Social History. Leiden: Brill Publishers. pp. 462–501. ISBN 978-90-04-28828-7.
- Moynihan, Michael; Søderlind, Didrik (2003) [1998]. Lords of Chaos: The Bloody Rise of the Satanic Metal Underground (Revised and expanded ed.). Port Townsend, Washington: Feral House. ISBN 0-922915-94-6.
- Petersen, Jesper Aagaard (2004). "Modern Satanism: Dark Doctrines and Black Flames". In Lewis, James R.; Petersen, Jesper Aagaard (eds.). Controversial New Religions (1st ed.). New York: Oxford University Press. ISBN 978-0-19-515682-9.
- Petersen, Jesper Aagaard, ed. (2016) [2009]. Contemporary Religious Satanism: A Critical Anthology. Abingdon, Oxford: Routledge. ISBN 978-0-7546-5286-1.
- van Luijk, Ruben (2016). "Adolescent Satanism, Metal Satanism, Cyber-Satanism". Children of Lucifer: The Origins of Modern Religious Satanism. Oxford Studies in Western Esotericism. New York: Oxford University Press. pp. 381–385. ISBN 978-0-19-027512-9.
- Williams, Thomas J. T. (May 2012). "A Blaze in the Northern Sky: Black Metal and Crimes Against Culture". Public Archaeology. 11 (2). Maney Publishing: 59–72. doi:10.1179/1465518712Z.0000000006. S2CID 145058950.
