= Lords of Chaos (film) =

2018 film directed by Jonas Åkerlund

- British theatrical release poster
- Directed by: Jonas Åkerlund
- Screenplay by: Dennis Magnusson; Jonas Åkerlund
- Based on: Lords of Chaos by: Michael Moynihan; Didrik Søderlind
- Produced by: Kwesi Dickson; Danny Gabai; Jim Czarnecki; Erik Gordon; Jack Arbuthnott; Kō Mori
- Starring: Rory Culkin; Emory Cohen; Jack Kilmer; Sky Ferreira
- Cinematography: Pär M. Ekberg
- Edited by: Rickard Krantz
- Music by: Sigur Rós
- Production companies: Gunpowder & Sky; 20th Century Fox; Vice Films; Insurgent Media; Scott Free Films; RSA Films; Eleven Arts
- Distributed by: Arrow Films (United Kingdom); Gunpowder & Sky (United States); Nordisk Film (Sweden)
- Release dates: 23 January 2018 (Sundance); 8 February 2019 (United States); 29 March 2019 (United Kingdom); 5 April 2019 (Sweden)
- Running time: 118 minutes
- Countries: United Kingdom; Sweden; United States
- Language: English
- Box office: $343,402

Lords of Chaos is a 2018 biographical horror film directed and co-written by Jonas Åkerlund. Adapted from the 1998 book of the same name, the film is a fictionalized account of the early 1990s Norwegian black metal scene told from the perspective of musician Øystein "Euronymous" Aarseth who co-founded the influential group Mayhem. The film stars Rory Culkin as Euronymous, Emory Cohen as Varg Vikernes, Jack Kilmer as Per “Dead” Ohlin, and Sky Ferreira as Ann-Marit.

The film premiered at the Sundance Film Festival on 23 January 2018. It was released in the United States on 8 February 2019 by Gunpowder & Sky, in the United Kingdom on 29 March 2019 by Arrow Films and in Sweden on 5 April 2019 by Nordisk Film. Critical reception for Lords of Chaos was mostly positive, but fans of metal music were sharply polarized and the musicians depicted in the film had mixed feelings.

== Plot ==
In 1984, young guitarist Euronymous forms black metal band Mayhem, the first of the genre in their country of Norway, with Necrobutcher on bass and Manheim on drums. Manheim leaves and is soon replaced by new drummer Hellhammer, and they recruit a vocalist from Sweden called Dead. Dead exhibits self-destructive behavior; during their live shows, he cuts himself, bleeds on the audience, and throws pig heads at the "posers". At a show filmed by their friend Metalion, the band meets a timid fan named Kristian, whom Euronymous initially undermines and patronizes. Euronymous also meets Ann-Marit, a girl from the metal community, and is instantly attracted to her.

While home alone, Dead slits his wrists and throat with a knife, then uses Euronymous' shotgun to shoot himself in the forehead, leaving behind a suicide note. Euronymous returns to find Dead's body; instead of calling the police, he repositions and takes photos of the corpse. After Dead's body is taken to the morgue, Euronymous makes necklaces out of pieces of Dead's skull and gives them to the other members. Horrified and disgusted at Euronymous' flippant response to their friend's death, Necrobutcher leaves the band.

Soon after, Euronymous starts his own black metal record label and opens a record shop called Helvete ("Hell"), which becomes a social hub for black metal fans, including Kristian, who is now calling himself Varg Vikernes. They become known as the "Black Circle". After being mocked by Euronymous, Varg burns down a local church. When challenged by Varg regarding his status as the leader of the Black Circle, Euronymous burns down a church with Faust and Varg accompanying. Not long after, Ann-Marit and Euronymous enter a relationship.

Euronymous recruits Varg as bassist, along with a guitarist called Blackthorn and Hungarian vocalist Attila Csihar, to record Mayhem's first album, De Mysteriis Dom Sathanas. A power struggle between Varg and Euronymous soon arises.

After a wave of church burnings and the murder of a gay man by Faust, police begin to link members of the local black metal scene to the crimes, sending Euronymous into paranoia. Helvete is shut down, and Varg is arrested as prime suspect after an interview with a Bergen newspaper in which he boasts about his responsibility for the crimes, though he is soon released due to a lack of evidence. Afterwards, Varg tells Euronymous that he is leaving Mayhem with plans to start his own record label. In the ensuing conversation, Euronymous admits that the skull piece necklaces were fake and that his violent, anti-authority mindset is merely a persona he adopted for the sake of promoting the band, which angers Varg.

While packing up the shop, Euronymous angrily rants to a peer about Varg, blaming Varg for the deterioration of the black metal community and expressing a desire to kill him in retaliation. After taking advice from Ann-Marit, Euronymous calms down, sends Varg a contract releasing Burzum's music rights to him, and decides to continue with Mayhem.

When Varg hears of Euronymous' death threats, he travels to Oslo to confront him. He convinces Euronymous to let him enter the apartment by stating he wants to sign the contract. However, once inside, Varg stabs him after a brief conversation. Varg chases Euronymous to the stairwell outside, where he stabs him to death, ignoring him as he pleads for his life. News of Euronymous' murder spreads throughout Norway and Varg is soon arrested. He is convicted of both the murder of Euronymous and the burning of several churches and sentenced to a maximum of 21 years in prison. In a voice-over, Euronymous tells the audience not to mourn his death, as he lived a successful life and accomplished many things.

== Cast ==
- Rory Culkin as Øystein "Euronymous" Aarseth
- Emory Cohen as Kristian "Varg" Vikernes (Note: This is how the character is credited in the film, despite the fact that Varg no longer uses the "Kristian" name.)
- Jack Kilmer as Pelle "Dead" Ohlin (Note: Although Dead's real first name was "Per", the film credit uses his nickname "Pelle" and the name "Per" is not mentioned once in the film, only "Pelle" and "Dead", therefore "Pelle" is the correct term for the cast listing.)
- Anthony De La Torre as Jan Axel "Hellhammer" Blomberg
- Sky Ferreira as Ann-Marit
- Valter Skarsgård as Bård Guldvik "Faust" Eithun
- Sam Coleman as Jon "Metalion" Kristiansen
- Jonathan Barnwell as Jørn "Necrobutcher" Stubberud
- Wilson Gonzalez Ochsenknecht as Varg's Driver (Note: Credited as "Varg's Driver" for legal reasons and not named at any point in the film. The correct credit is "Varg's Driver", not "Blackthorn".)
- Gustaf Hammarsten as Finn Tender
- Lucian Charles Collier as Stian "Occultus" Johannsen
- Anette Martinsen as Norwegian Newscaster
- Andrew Lavelle as Gylve "Fenriz" Nagell
- James Edwin as Kjetil Manheim
- Arion Csihar as Attila Csihar
- Jon Øigarden as Magne Andreassen
- Jason Arnopp as himself

== Production ==
Lords of Chaos is based on Michael Moynihan and Didrik Søderlind's 1998 book Lords of Chaos, published by Feral House. Originally, Japanese director Sion Sono was set to direct a film based on the book, with Jackson Rathbone starring as Varg Vikernes. It would have been Sono's first English-language film. The screenplay was written by Hans Fjellestad (who was earlier reported to be the film's director as well), Ryan Page, Adam Parfrey (the book's publisher), and Sono. In July 2009, Sono stated that filming (in Norway) would begin in August or September and end in December. The film was set to be released in 2010. It was later announced that Rathbone would no longer be playing Vikernes due to scheduling conflicts.

In May 2015, it was announced that former Bathory drummer and film director Jonas Åkerlund would direct the film. The film was set to shoot in the fall of 2015 in Norway, but for unknown reasons, filming did not begin until 2016. Rory Culkin said that he had lost faith in the film coming out in the years between the first announcement and even cut his hair he had grown for the role, only for two weeks later to get confirmation on production starting. Hungarian black metal band Bornholm served as consultants for the film, helping teach Culkin and the other actors the techniques for their playing to look believable.

The film was shot in Oslo, Norway, with live performance scenes shot in Budapest, Hungary. The live sequences shoot also included filming for the Metallica music video "ManUNkind", starring the cast of the film. The burning churches, which were in a scale of half the size of the originals, were built out of the wood from the sets of Blade Runner 2049, which was also filming in Budapest.

Vikernes, who had already expressed criticisms against the book, stated in a video uploaded to his YouTube channel in 2016 that when approached by the filmmakers, he, along with Mayhem and Darkthrone, denied the rights for their music to be used in the film. In a 2018 interview, Åkerlund said that they had in fact secured the rights to Mayhem's music.

== Historical accuracy ==
Åkerlund described the film as "about truth and lies". In an interview for Dazed, it was reported that Åkerlund consulted "original band merch ... was granted access to key police reports as well as detailed photos of Euronymous's record store Helvete, and the house the band camped out in. ... Åkerlund even used real locations for exterior shots of, among others, Euronymous's flat and a rebuilt church that Vikernes burnt down in Holmenkollen."

Culkin said that he prepared for his role by consulting several associates of Euronymous: "They almost always compared him to a mythological creature: one person said he was kind of like a gnome and another said he was like an evil elf. Because he was [a] small dude but confident in himself and he has this clan around him, people really embellished and lionised him."

In one scene from the film, Dead anachronistically declares, "We are Lords of Chaos." The name actually originates from the unrelated American criminal group whose name was adopted for the book Lords of Chaos. The book's scope was not focused solely on the Norwegian black metal scene.

Jack Kilmer's performance as the band's frontman Dead has received praise for being the most accurate portrayal in the film, with the exception of one scene where he has a cat hanging from his room. The real Dead never killed any cats but did chase them off for fun. Some criticisms were made that the Live in Jessheim scene jumps to Dead's suicide, given a whole year had passed between both events and Dead and Euronymous' subsequent falling out and animosity was never portrayed apart from one scene in which Euronymous mockingly waves a shotgun in front of Dead and suggests he shoots himself. The time Varg claims Dead stabbed Euronymous was never portrayed in the film.

It is also suggested throughout the film that Dead and Euronymous had a close friendship, when in fact Dead was much closer to Necrobutcher.

== Release and reception ==
The first screening on Lords of Chaos was held at the Sundance Film Festival on 23 January 2018 in Park City, Utah. In October 2018, a first-quarter 2019 release window for the United States was announced, with Arrow Films securing the distribution rights in the United Kingdom, where it was released on 29 March 2019. The film was released in the US in theaters on 8 February 2019 and via video on demand on 22 February 2019 by Gunpowder & Sky. In Sweden, it was released on 5 April 2019 by Nordisk Film.

=== Critical reception ===
On the review aggregator website Rotten Tomatoes, 73% of 75 critics' reviews are positive, with an average rating of 6.7/10. The website's consensus reads: "Lords of Chaos presents a grimly compelling dramatization of a real-life music scene whose aggressively nihilistic aesthetic spilled over into fatal acts of violence." On Metacritic, the film has a weighted average score of 48 out of 100, based on 17 critics, indicating "mixed or average" reviews.

In his review for The Hollywood Reporter, Justin Lowe praised Lords of Chaos as a "vibrant biopic" that "provokes both awe and repulsion". Amy Nicholson of Variety wrote, "Despite Åkerlund's refusal to lionize these immature kids, Lords of Chaos is tremendous fun. ... he can also get great performances out of a young cast". IndieWire's Michael Nordine awarded the film a B rating and wrote "Lords of Chaos is frequently unpleasant but oddly compelling—not least because Åkerlund ensures that the film never takes itself as seriously as its subjects did."

Conversely, The A.V. Club's Katie Rife decried that "Åkerlund's understanding [of the Norwegian black metal scene] is more like contempt". Kory Grow of Rolling Stone wrote: "perhaps the film's worst sin is its tone ... It's not fun. It's not sad. A lot of the time, it's not even all that interesting." Robert Ham of Consequence wrote that "Instead of courting [the black metal] audience, or trying to find some middle ground where [Åkerlund] celebrates the music while rightfully disparaging the actions of some of its worst figureheads, he punches down with a smirk and dismisses the birth of a genre as the product of misspent youth."

The New York Times' Manohla Dargis criticised the film for "never establish[ing] a coherent or interesting point of view. The tone unproductively veers from the goofy to the creepy, which creates a sense that [Åkerlund] was still figuring it out in the editing." Robert Abele of the Los Angeles Times summarized, "Ultimately it all adds up to a hodgepodge of styles and attitudes with hardly any insight into what made this corrosive clique so magnetic to its adherents."

=== Reactions from the depicted ===
Attila Csihar, in a January 2019 interview, stated that the official opinion of the current Mayhem members regarding the film and its creators is a "big fuck you". He pointed out that the film was based on a book and only focused on Mayhem during the 1990s, not the whole black metal scene at the time. He confirmed that some Tormentor songs appear in the film and that he himself is played by his son, Arion Csihar. Attila himself was present during the shooting of the church burning scenes. In a later interview in May 2019, he offered a more nuanced critique of the film, saying that while the film is based on reality, he disagrees with how the story was presented, and that the characters were portrayed as "idiots".

Vikernes harshly criticised the film as "made-up crap", objecting to being portrayed by a Jewish actor and to plot elements, calling the depiction "character murder".

Necrobutcher has provided ambivalent reactions after viewing the film: he praised the production values and the wardrobe accuracy, but noted that the movie was "sad" and "not a good movie", and that viewing the murder scenes had an emotional effect on him. He also addressed Mayhem's initial negative reaction to the announcement of the film, and explained that their intense negative reaction was largely because the band had only been approached after production on the film had started, and that he gave permission to use Mayhem's music in the film after seeing a rough cut. Ultimately, he noted that the film had very little impact on the band.

== See also ==
- Until the Light Takes Us, 2008 documentary film about the Norwegian black metal scene
- Murder of Euronymous
