= List of musicians in the early Norwegian black metal scene =

This is a list of Norwegian artists that released black metal music from 1987–1993 during the early Norwegian black metal scene. The scene of which they were part is credited with creating the modern black metal genre and produced some of the most acclaimed and influential artists in extreme metal. It attracted massive media attention when it was revealed that its members had been responsible for two murders and a wave of church burnings in Norway.

The scene had an ethos and the core members referred to themselves as "The Black Circle" or "Black Metal Inner Circle". It consisted primarily of young men, many of whom gathered at the record shop Helvete ("Hell") in Oslo. In interviews, they voiced extreme anti-Christian and misanthropic views, presenting themselves as a cult-like group of militant Satanists who wanted to spread terror, hatred and evil. They adopted pseudonyms and appeared in photographs wearing "corpse paint" and wielding medieval weaponry. The scene was exclusive and created boundaries around itself, incorporating only those it deemed to be "trve" or committed. Musical integrity was highly important and artists wanted black metal to remain underground and uncorrupted.

== List ==
Band	Formed	From
Ancient	1992	Bergen
Arcturus	1991	Oslo
Burzum	1991	Bergen
Carpathian Forest (a.k.a. Enthrone)	1990	Sandnes, Rogaland
Darkthrone	1986	Kolbotn
Dimmu Borgir	1993	Oslo
Emperor	1991	Notodden, Telemark
Enslaved	1991	Haugesund, Rogaland
Fimbulwinter	1992	Oslo
Fleurety	1991	Enebakk
Gehenna	1993	Stavanger, Rogaland
Gorgoroth	1992	Bergen
Hades/Hades Almighty	1992	Bergen
Ildjarn	1991	Bø, Telemark
Immortal	1991	Bergen
In the Woods...	1991	Kristiansand
Manes (a.k.a. Perifa)	1991	Trondheim
Mayhem	1984	Oslo
Myrkskog	1993	Drammen
Satyricon	1991	Oslo
Strid (a.k.a. Malfeitor)	1991	Askim
Taake (as Thule)	1993	Bergen
Thorns (a.k.a. Stigma Diabolicum)	1989	Trondheim
Thou Shalt Suffer	1991	Notodden, Telemark
Tsjuder	1993	Oslo
Tulus	1993	Oslo
Ulver	1993	Oslo
