= Lords of Chaos (book) =

1998 music history book

Lords of Chaos: The Bloody Rise of the Satanic Metal Underground
- Author: Michael J. Moynihan, Didrik Søderlind
- Language: English
- Genre: Music, history
- Publisher: Feral House
- Publication date: 1998 (orig.); 2003 (rev.)
- Publication place: United States
- ISBN: 0-922915-48-2 (orig.); ISBN 0-922915-94-6 (rev.)
- OCLC: 39151590
- Dewey Decimal: 133.4/22/09481 21
- LC Class: ML3534 .M73 1998

Lords of Chaos: The Bloody Rise of the Satanic Metal Underground is a book by Michael J. Moynihan and Didrik Søderlind. It is an account of the early Norwegian black metal scene, with a focus on the string of church burnings and murders that occurred in the country around 1993. A film adaptation of the book was directed by Swedish director Jonas Åkerlund in 2018. The book has been the subject of controversy over the alleged far-right political leanings of author Michael Moynihan, though he denies these allegations.

== Publication history ==
Lords of Chaos was originally published by Feral House in 1998 (ISBN 0-922915-48-2). A second, revised edition was released in 2003 and expands the original book by fifty pages (ISBN 0-922915-94-6). A German edition was published in 2002 with a respective revised edition following in 2005 (ISBN 3-936878-00-5).

== Summary ==
The book focuses on the scene surrounding the extreme heavy metal subgenre black metal in Norway between 1990 and 1993. The first few chapters give an outline of the progression of heavy metal from bands such as Black Sabbath, Coven and Black Widow to proto-black metal bands such as Bathory, Mercyful Fate, Celtic Frost, Sarcófago, Hellhammer and Venom, and finally to the early Norwegian black metal band Mayhem.

The book then details the April 1991 suicide of Mayhem frontman Per Yngve "Dead" Ohlin and the formation of a radicalized "inner circle" around Øystein "Euronymous" Aarseth, based out of his small black metal retail shop Helvete (Norwegian for "hell") in Oslo, Norway.

In 1992 and 1993, members of the group became connected with a series of crimes, starting with the arson of the Fantoft stave church on June 6, 1992, although the book mentions that there had previously been a "small, ineffectual fire at Storeveit Church". Church arsons continued but with a steady decline up until 1995. (The cover of Lords of Chaos shows a "19th-century Swedish church in flames".)

An interview in a Norwegian newspaper given by Burzum founder Varg "Count Grishnackh" Vikernes, also a member of the Helvete group, leads to a media outrage condemning the arsons as acts of Satanism. On August 21, 1992, Bård "Faust" Eithun of the band Emperor murdered a homosexual man in the Olympic Park in Lillehammer. He was subsequently convicted of this crime and sentenced to 14 years in prison (of which he served nine before being released in 2003). On August 10, 1993, Aarseth was murdered by Vikernes, who received a 21-year sentence for the murder and several cases of arson related to the church burnings.

The book also mentions other cases of "Satanic" murderers, such as that of Sandro Beyer by members of the German National Socialist black metal band Absurd and Caleb Fairley in the USA. It also devotes several pages to the case of a self-styled teen militia named "Lords of Chaos" that perpetrated murder and arson in Fort Myers, Florida, in April 1996.

Interview passages with Varg Vikernes are spread out through several sections of the book. On Burzum.org Vikernes has said he would not use the term "Nazi" any longer as self-descriptor; however, the statement is ambiguous.

An interview with Vikernes about Nasjonal Samling founder Vidkun Quisling, executed in 1945 for high treason by the Norwegian government after the end of the occupation of Norway by Nazi Germany, is the main proof of Vikernes' admiration of him, and the proof of the rumor that Quisling had some influence on certain extreme strains of Norwegian black metal.

The book presents other interviews with Anton LaVey, founder of the Church of Satan, Tomas "Samoth" Haugen of Emperor, and Dani Filth of Cradle of Filth. Filth discussed the existence of a "Satanic Gestapo", when he recounts an incident where he was apparently attacked on stage with a knife (which he states may have been a prop) during a concert in Germany.

The authors put forward their own thesis about the reason behind the extreme music, the arsons and the cases of murder, interpreting these events as the appearance of an odinic archetype. Within this scope, the psychologist Carl Jung is quoted and also a study Pathological firesetting from 1951.

Satanism and the heathenism from which it ultimately descends are themselves the products of the archetypes and differentiated psyches of nations and peoples, and they therefore spring from the same "occult" or mystical sources as nationalism itself. Nationalism is the political manifestation of a folk's unconscious; heathenism/Satanism is the spiritual manifestation.

The book goes on to compare the state sought by the commission of these violent acts with the apocalyptic Norse tale Ragnarök, but states that neither radicalized black metallers nor "their occasional allies, the right-wing revolutionaries" may have found "the fuse on the powderkeg of alienated resentment which lies behind the façade of 20th-century civilisation", yet that such a "powderkeg" exists nonetheless.

== Critical reaction ==
Reviews of Lords of Chaos have been mixed, with several critics praising the book for offering an informative or at least interesting view on a relatively obscure subculture, and the book won a 1998 Firecracker Alternative Book Award. The publication was sometimes criticized for a perceived lack of distance towards its subject matter. This was considered especially alarming to groups and figures that had accused Moynihan of right-wing sympathies, charges he has denied.

German online magazine Telepolis questioned Moynihan's neutrality towards the ideologies portrayed in the book, as it leaves several far-right and racist statements by interviewees such as Vikernes uncommented on and uncriticized. The author's questions during these interviews are noted to resemble "cue-giving" at times.

While a reviewer for the left-oriented German newspaper Die Tageszeitung did not appreciate Moynihan earning royalties from the sales of Lords of Chaos, he still called it "the most thrilling non-fiction book since the Old Testament". Televangelist Bob Larson stated that he and Moynihan were "poles apart spiritually and philosophically", but that he respected the book as an "exhaustive resource regarding the seamy and Satanic side of pop music and culture".

Journalist Kevin Coogan wrote an essay titled "How Black Is Black Metal?", in which he discusses several of the ideas purported in Lords of Chaos. Coogan considers Moynihan's personal political beliefs to be "at work just below the surface of a text ostensibly devoted solely to analyzing an extremist musical sub-culture" and ultimately counters the book's apocalyptic thesis with the conclusion that the black metal/fascism connection hangs largely "on a thin evidentiary thread", namely Varg Vikernes, who had shown extremist tendencies well before entering the scene. Coogan states that Moynihan is "an extreme rightist whose fusion of politics and aesthetic violence shapes a not-so-hidden sub current that runs throughout LoC". Coogan writes that the book itself:

...is not a "fascist" tract in the strict sense of the term, in part because Moynihan co-wrote the book with Didrik Søderlind, a former music critic for a mainstream Norwegian paper who is now (as of 2005) an editor at Playboy. Moreover, Feral House editor Adam Parfrey clearly wanted to publish a popular book on the strange universe of black metal rather than a political polemic.

Moynihan, in turn, has denied Coogan's allegations.

Varg Vikernes, a primary focal point of the book, has criticized the book. Vikernes states that the authors of Lords of Chaos have no "insight into or even good knowledge about the subjects discussed" and "don't understand one bit what Black Metal was about in 1991 and 1992", and that they "have managed to fill the heads of a generation of metal fans with lies".

== Adaptation ==
A 2018 feature film adaptation directed by Jonas Åkerlund premiered at the 2018 Sundance Film Festival on January 23, 2018, in Park City, Utah. It stars Rory Culkin and Emory Cohen in the roles of Euronymous and Varg Vikernes respectively. Jack Kilmer, Anthony De La Torre and Jonathan Barnwell portray Dead, Hellhammer and Necrobutcher of the band Mayhem. The cast also includes Sky Ferreira, Valter Skarsgård and Lucian Charles Collier.

== See also ==
- Until the Light Takes Us
- Black Sun
- Gods of the Blood
- Satan rir media
- Fascist satanism
