= Thorns (Thorns album) =

Studio album by Thorns
- Released: 2001
- Recorded: 1998–2000
- Genres: Black metal, industrial metal
- Length: 48:02
- Label: Moonfog
- Producers: Snorre W. Ruch, Satyr

Thorns chronology
Thorns vs. Emperor (1999)	Thorns (2001)	Stigma Diabolicum (2007)

Professional ratings
Review scores
Source	Rating
AllMusic	4/5 stars
Chronicles of Chaos	9/10

Thorns is the debut studio album by Norwegian black metal band Thorns. It was released in 2001 through Moonfog Productions.

The album features guest appearances from Satyr (of Satyricon), Aldrahn (of Dødheimsgard) and Hellhammer (of Mayhem).

In 2013, Decibel ranked it at number 43 on its list of the Top 100 Black Metal Albums of All Time.

== Track listing ==
All music is composed by Snorre Ruch.

No.	Title	Lyrics	Length
1.	"Existence"	Ruch	4:11
2.	"World Playground Deceit"	Satyr	7:07
3.	"Shifting Channels"	Aldrahn	6:16
4.	"Stellar Master Elite"	Ruch	3:52
5.	"Underneath the Universe 1" (instrumental)		7:47
6.	"Underneath the Universe 2"	Aldrahn	7:29
7.	"Interface to God"	Ruch	4:35
8.	"Vortex"	Ruch	6:45

== Personnel ==
- Aldrahn (Bjørn Dencker) – vocals (tracks 1, 3, 6)
- Satyr (Sigurd Wongraven) – vocals, production, mixing, mastering (tracks 2, 4, 6, 7)
- Snorre W. Ruch – guitar, bass guitar, keyboards, programming, vocals on the song "Vortex", production, mixing, mastering
- Hellhammer (Jan Axel Blomberg) – drums

Production

- Mike Hartung – recording, engineering, mixing, mastering
- Morten Lund – mastering
