= Satan rir media =

1999 Norwegian documentary film

Satan rir media (Satan Rides the Media) is a 1999 Norwegian documentary by Torstein Grude. The film covers the controversy that surrounded black metal musician Varg Vikernes in the early 1990s, who not only has been tied to a series of church arsons in Norway, but received widespread media attention for the murder of Mayhem band member Øystein "Euronymous" Aarseth.

== Summary ==
According to Satan rir media, two (unnamed) trainee journalists had approached the Bergens Tidende (BT), a major Norwegian newspaper, with a story they had done with Vikernes. This story mentioned the torching of churches and a murder which attracted the interest of Finn Bjørn Tønder, a crime journalist. He persuaded the two to show him the man and eventually met Vikernes, describing him in the documentary as the "weirdest person I think I have ever met in my life". Tønder conducted an interview with Vikernes and promised him full anonymity. According to Vikernes Tønder claimed he needed a photo of Vikernes in order to prove to his colleagues that the interview was real, but that this photo would never be used in the newspaper. The night before the article was published in the newspaper, Vikernes was arrested.

Tønder then went to see if he could confirm the facts independently with hospital and law enforcement. While making several phone calls, he insists he protected the anonymity of his source. However, Vikernes was convinced that the journalist gave information to the police and misrepresented his words in the published article. In the film Svein Erik Krogvold, the main police investigator in the case, said that police got the name directly from Tønder and thus could initiate an arrest of Vikernes. Vikernes was arrested the day the article was printed.

The documentary also shows the development of the early Norwegian black metal scene, the inspiration for it, prevailing thoughts and attitudes and ultimately how the Norwegian media contributed to making the scene known worldwide by hyping the Satanist angle and thus inspiring copycat arsons.
