= Lords of Chaos (criminal group) =

1996 teen criminal group

- Founded: April 13, 1996
- Founded by: Kevin Foster, Pete Magnotti, Chris Black
- Founding location: Fort Myers, Florida
- Years active: April 13 – May 3, 1996
- Membership (est.): 8
- Criminal activities: Arson, murder

Kevin Foster
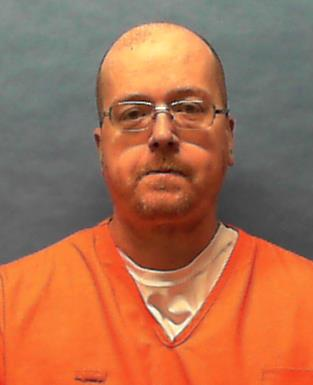
- Mug shot of Kevin Foster circa 2023
- Born: Kevin Donald Bates; June 16, 1977 (age 49); Amarillo, Texas, U.S.
- Parents: Ruby Foster (mother); John Bates (father)
- Status: Incarcerated at Union Correctional Institution
- Convictions: First-degree murder, attempted murder, arson, armed robbery
- Penalty: Death

The Lords of Chaos was a self-styled teen militia formed on April 13, 1996, in Fort Myers, Florida, United States. It was led by Kevin Donald Foster (born Kevin Donald Bates; June 16, 1977). The group gained notoriety for a crime spree that ended on April 30, 1996, with the murder of one of the boys' teachers, Mark Schwebes, the Riverdale High School's band director.

The case has been documented most extensively in Jim Greenhill's true crime book Someone Has to Die Tonight. It is also the subject of a Dateline NBC special, When a Killer Calls, as well as being mentioned in Lords of Chaos: The Bloody Rise of the Satanic Metal Underground by Michael Moynihan and Didrik Søderlind, with the book borrowing the group's name.

== Formation of the Lords of Chaos ==
Kevin "God" Foster, Pete "Fried" Magnotti, Chris "Slim" Black, and Derek "Mob" Shields made up the core members of the Lords of Chaos. The group also included lesser associates, Chris "Red" Burnett, Thomas "Dog" Torrone, Brad Young, and Craig Lesh.

On April 12, 1996, in Fort Myers, Florida, Kevin Foster, Pete Magnotti, and Chris Black went on a vandalism and arson spree. Florida juvenile records show Kevin Foster, the group’s ringleader, was the only member with prior arrests or criminal history, consisting primarily of driving violations. The first spree was quickly followed by a second that included an attempt to burn a church bus and the burning of a bird cage containing two macaws, killing one.

Foster eventually decided they should form a militia dedicated to terrorizing the community. The creation of the group's symbol ( (Ø) ) came from an in-joke involving a question Foster missed on a math test. The symbol for the null or empty set is either { } or Ø. On the test, Foster wrote ( Ø ) as the answer to a question whose answer was not set, marking it incorrect.

== Escalation ==
In an East Lee Tribune article titled "Hell Raising in Buckingham," a local reporter lashed out at the unknown culprits, calling them "obviously pea-brained vandals" and "person(s) of less than average intelligence and a cretin's personality."

On April 17, 1996, the group wrote a document entitled "Declaration of War: Formal Introduction of Lords of Chaos," which they planned to mail to the Lee County Clerk/Traffic Violations Bureau but ultimately did not. The manifesto warned:

Lee County is dealing with a formidable foe, with high caliber intelligence, balls of titanium alloy, and a wicked, destructive streak. . . Be prepared for destruction of biblical proportions, for this is the coming of a NEW GOD, whose fiery hand shall lay waste to the populous [sic]. THE GAMES HAVE JUST BEGUN, AND TERROR SHALL ENSUE. . . .

In the early morning of April 20, 1996, the group escalated their terror campaign by destroying a historic 12,300-square-foot (1,140 m^{2}) two-story brick Coca-Cola bottling plant in Fort Myers. Foster's original plan had been to destroy the building on April 19 to emulate the Oklahoma City bombing on its one year anniversary. Like Timothy McVeigh, he saw his actions as a retaliation against the government for the Waco Siege, which had occurred on April 19, 1993.

Foster used a Pepsi can filled with gunpowder and fitted with a 25 ft (7.6 m) firework fuse to destroy the historic building. While the other boys arranged stolen propane tanks around the building, Foster ignited the fuse of the homemade bomb. The boys then retreated to a picnic table across the street where they could view the destruction. About 13 minutes later, an intense explosion ripped through the building, causing an estimated $100,000 in damage.

On April 26, Kevin Foster and Peter Magnotti robbed and carjacked Emory Lewis, Derek Shields's landlord and the owner of the local Alva Country Diner. Shields had hated Lewis since he had heard him call his mother a "bitch" and "poor white trash." Lewis was uninjured in the attack.

== Murder of Mark Schwebes ==
On April 30, the group decided to steal clothes at a local Dillard's store for an upcoming "Grad Nite" at Walt Disney World, where Foster planned to steal one of the character's costumes to use as a disguise to shoot minorities at the amusement park. As part of their diversion, Foster rigged a smoke grenade, which he had purchased at an Army-Navy store, with fishing wire. The plan was to stack up the clothes they wanted and run out when the grenade went off; however, the grenade proved to be a dud.

The boys decided to vandalize Riverdale High School's auditorium. They stole latex gloves, a fire extinguisher, two staplers, and a bag of canned peaches. Foster rigged a Clorox bleach bottle full of gasoline with a lit rag and threw it through the auditorium window.

Mark Schwebes, 32, the band director at Riverdale, caught members of the group loitering on the school grounds and confiscated the peaches, staplers, and fire extinguisher. He recognized Black and Torrone, telling the boys not to be surprised to get a visit from the police in the morning. After Schwebes left, Black angrily stated, "This has to be fixed tonight because tomorrow's a school day. So, he's gotta die tonight."

Although Schwebes had an unlisted telephone number, the boys could procure his address through local directory assistance. Most of the other boys went home, leaving only Kevin Foster, Chris Black, Pete Magnotti, and Derek Shields, the group's core members. It was decided that Foster would do the actual shooting. Black would act as getaway driver, Shields would knock on the door, and Magnotti would stay in the car and act as a lookout. On the way to the killing, Foster sang a parody of "Santa Claus Is Coming to Town":

He sees you when you're sleeping,
He knows when you're awake.
He knows if you've been bad or good,
So be good for goodness' sake!
O! You better watch out!
You better not cry,
Better shut up
And prepare to die.
Kevin Foster's coming to your house.

At approximately 11:30 pm, Foster and the others went to Mark Schwebes home and knocked on the front door. When Schwebes opened the door, Foster shot him in the face with a Mossberg 12-gauge shotgun. Authorities believe he died instantly. Foster shot him a second time, in the buttocks, because he perceived Schwebes as homosexual. Mistakenly believing it was impossible to trace shells back to his shotgun because it was a smooth bore weapon, Foster left the two spent shotgun shells at the scene.

== Arrest and trial ==
At first, lead detectives on the case focused on a love triangle they believed Mark Schwebes had been involved in. However, members of the group soon began bragging about the killing. On May 2, Craig Lesh, a hanger-on of the group, bragged to his ex-girlfriend Julie Schuchard that the Lords of Chaos killed Mark Schwebes. He told her that he had been present and was the one who had knocked on the door. On May 3, after a restless night, Schuchard decided that she had to tell the authorities what she knew.

From Schuchard, detectives learned not only of Schwebes's murder, but of the group's plans to commit armed robbery at a Hardee's restaurant where Magnotti and Shields worked. The detectives then questioned Craig Lesh. They learned he had not actually been present during the murder. Detectives also learned the group was responsible for the Coca-Cola bottling-plant bombing. This led to the arrests of the group's key members on their way to committing the Hardee's robbery.

Brad Young and Craig Lesh were released with no charges filed against them. Chris Burnett worked out a deal with prosecutors. He would plead guilty to second-degree arson and armed robbery, and turn state's evidence against the Lords of Chaos. In return he would serve two years in jail and receive ten years' probation. Tom Torrone also turned state evidence, and was allowed to plead no contest to second-degree arson. Torrone would serve one year in jail with ten years probation. In March 1997, Magnotti pleaded guilty to conspiracy to commit first-degree murder, was sentenced to 32 years and agreed to testify. Two weeks before his trial began, Shields pleaded guilty to first-degree murder, followed in October by Black. Both received life imprisonment. Three other members of the Lords of Chaos pleaded guilty in exchange for their testimony. Only Kevin Foster went to trial.

Lee County prosecutors Marshall King Hall, Bob Lee, and Randy McGruther offered Foster life without the possibility of parole. He turned this offer down. Foster told his attorneys, Bob Jacobs and Marquin Rinard, that he considered this fate worse than going to "Old Sparky," Florida's electric chair.

Jury selection for the trial began on March 3, 1998, presided over by Judge Isaac Anderson. During the trial Foster's mother testified that he was home during the murder of Schwebes. Though members of the Lords of Chaos took the stand and each stated that not only had Foster been there, he had been the ringleader of the plot.

On March 11, closing arguments were given, and the jury retired to deliberate. After 2 hours and 16 minutes, the jury reached a verdict of guilty. On April 9, 1998, the penalty phase of the trial began. The jury would decide if Foster received the death penalty or life without parole. By a vote of 9 to 3, the jury recommended the death penalty. On June 17, 1998, Judge Anderson agreed with the jury's recommendation and sentenced Foster to death.

== Subsequent events ==
In 2000, Foster's case reached the Florida Supreme Court, and his appeal was denied.

=== Retaliation murder conspiracy ===
Foster and his mother were later convicted of conspiracy to murder, planning retaliation murders against the members of the Lords of Chaos who testified against him in the original trial. They were charged with the crime in 2000 after having approached author Jim Greenhill for help in the plan. Instead, Greenhill reported it to the police. His mother was given five years in prison, and he was given an additional sentence concurrent with his death penalty.

=== Later appeals ===
In 2011 in Lee County, Florida, Foster sought a new trial or a new penalty phase based on a theory of inadequate representation, claiming counsel at the time of trial had not made a sufficient presentation on the issue of mental defects. The court denied relief.

In 2010 Shields requested clemency and was supported by former Lee County Sheriff, John McDougall, the sheriff who had arrested him. McDougall pointed out that Shields had been under duress at the time of the murder. Shields pointed out that he was not the trigger-man. The request was denied.

In 2017, Foster sought to have his death penalty removed based on a 2017 law signed by Florida Governor Rick Scott that required a unanimous jury verdict to recommend a death sentence. The jury in Foster's case voted 9–3 in favor of a death sentence.

In 2018, the Florida Supreme Court denied Foster's appeal. He remains on death row at Union Correctional Institution as of 2026.

Magnotti was released from prison in July 2023.

== Media attention ==
- The case was the subject of a 2006 episode of Dateline NBC.
- It was also the subject of the book Someone Has to Die Tonight by Jim Greenhill.
- The case is also the subject of season 1, episode 4 named "Lords of Chaos" on the television series The 1990s: The Deadliest Decade.
- The case was also the subject of an episode of Arrest & Trial called "Lords of Chaos" on November 21, 2000.
- It was mentioned in Criminal Minds Season 3, Episode 12, "3rd Life".

== See also ==
- Capital punishment in Florida
- List of death row inmates in the United States § Florida

== Sources ==
- Moynihan, Michael; Søderlind, Didrik (1998). Lords of Chaos: The Bloody Rise of the Satanic Metal Underground. Vennice, CA: Feral House. ISBN 978-0-922915-48-4.
- "When a Killer Calls". Dateline NBC. 2002. NBC Universal.
