= Euronymous =

Norwegian black metal musician (1968–1993)

- Euronymous (right) with Dead

Background information
- Also known as: Destructor
- Born: Øystein Aarseth; 22 March 1968; Surnadal Municipality, Norway
- Died: 10 August 1993 (aged 25) Oslo, Norway
- Cause of death: Murder (stab wounds)
- Genre: Black metal
- Occupation: Guitarist
- Years active: 1984–1993
- Label: Deathlike Silence Productions
- Formerly of: Mayhem

Øystein Aarseth (22 March 1968 – 10 August 1993), better known by his stage name Euronymous, was a Norwegian musician and a founder of and central figure in the early Norwegian black metal scene. He was a co-founder and guitarist of the Norwegian black metal band Mayhem and was the only constant member from the band's formation in 1984 until his murder in 1993. He was also founder and owner of the extreme metal record label Deathlike Silence Productions and record shop Helvete.

Euronymous professed to being a theistic Satanist and was known for making extreme misanthropic statements. He presented himself as leading a militant cult-like group known as the "Black Metal Inner Circle".

In August 1993, he was murdered by fellow musician and former bandmate Varg Vikernes.

== Biography ==
=== 1984–1991 ===
Aarseth formed Mayhem in 1984 along with bassist Necrobutcher (Jørn Stubberud) and drummer Kjetil Manheim. At the time he was going by the stage name Destructor but later changed his name to Euronymous, derived from the demon Eurynomos which inspired the Hellhammer song of the same name.

In summer 1986, Euronymous, Necrobutcher and Jon "Metalion" Kristiansen visited the German thrash metal band Assassin and recorded the Metalion in the Park demo under the name Checker Patrol, Metalion contributing background vocals to the title song "Metalion in the Park".

In 1988, Per "Dead" Ohlin became Mayhem's vocalist and Jan Axel "Hellhammer" Blomberg became its drummer. By 1991, Dead, Euronymous and Hellhammer were living in a house in the woods near Kråkstad, which was used as a place for the band to rehearse. Mayhem bassist Necrobutcher said that, after living together for a while, Dead and Euronymous "got on each other's nerves a lot" and "weren't really friends at the end". Hellhammer recalls that Dead once went outside to sleep in the woods because Euronymous was playing synth music that Dead hated. Euronymous then went outside and began shooting into the air with a shotgun. Varg Vikernes claims that Dead once stabbed Euronymous with a knife.

On 8 April 1991, Dead was found deceased by Euronymous at his home with slit wrists and a shotgun wound to the head. His death was considered suicide. Before calling the police, Euronymous went to a shop and bought a disposable camera with which he photographed the body, after rearranging some items. One of these photographs was later used as the cover of a bootleg live album: The Dawn of the Black Hearts. Necrobutcher recalls how Euronymous told him of the suicide:

Øystein called me up the next day ... and says, "Dead has done something really cool! He killed himself". I thought, have you lost it? What do you mean cool? He says, "Relax, I have photos of everything". I was in shock and grief. He was just thinking how to exploit it. So I told him, "OK. Don't even fucking call me before you destroy those pictures".

Euronymous used Dead's suicide to foster Mayhem's "evil" image and claimed Dead had killed himself because black metal had become "trendy" and commercialized. In time, rumors spread that Euronymous had made a stew with bits of Dead's brain and had made necklaces with bits of his skull. The band later denied the former rumor but confirmed that the latter was true. Moreover, Euronymous claimed to have given these necklaces to musicians he deemed worthy, which was confirmed by several other members of the scene, like Bård "Faust" Eithun, and Metalion. Morgan Steinmeyer Håkansson of Marduk also confirmed this and that he also owns a piece of Dead's brain matter as well as lead from the shotgun shot, all which were gifted to him by Euronymous.

Necrobutcher later speculated that taking the photographs and forcing others to see them was a way for Euronymous to cope with the shock of seeing his friend dead. He claimed that Euronymous "went into a fantasy world". Faust of Emperor believes that Dead's suicide "marked the point at which, under Euronymous' direction, the black metal scene began its obsession with all things satanic and evil". Kjetil Manheim said that, after the suicide, Euronymous "tried to be as extreme as he had talked about". The suicide caused a rift between Euronymous and some of his friends, who were disgusted by his attitude towards Dead before the suicide, and his behavior afterwards. Thus, after the suicide, Mayhem was left with only two members: guitarist Euronymous and drummer Hellhammer. Stian "Occultus" Johannsen was recruited as Mayhem's new singer and bassist. However, this was short-lived; he left the band after receiving a death threat from Euronymous.

=== 1991–1993 ===
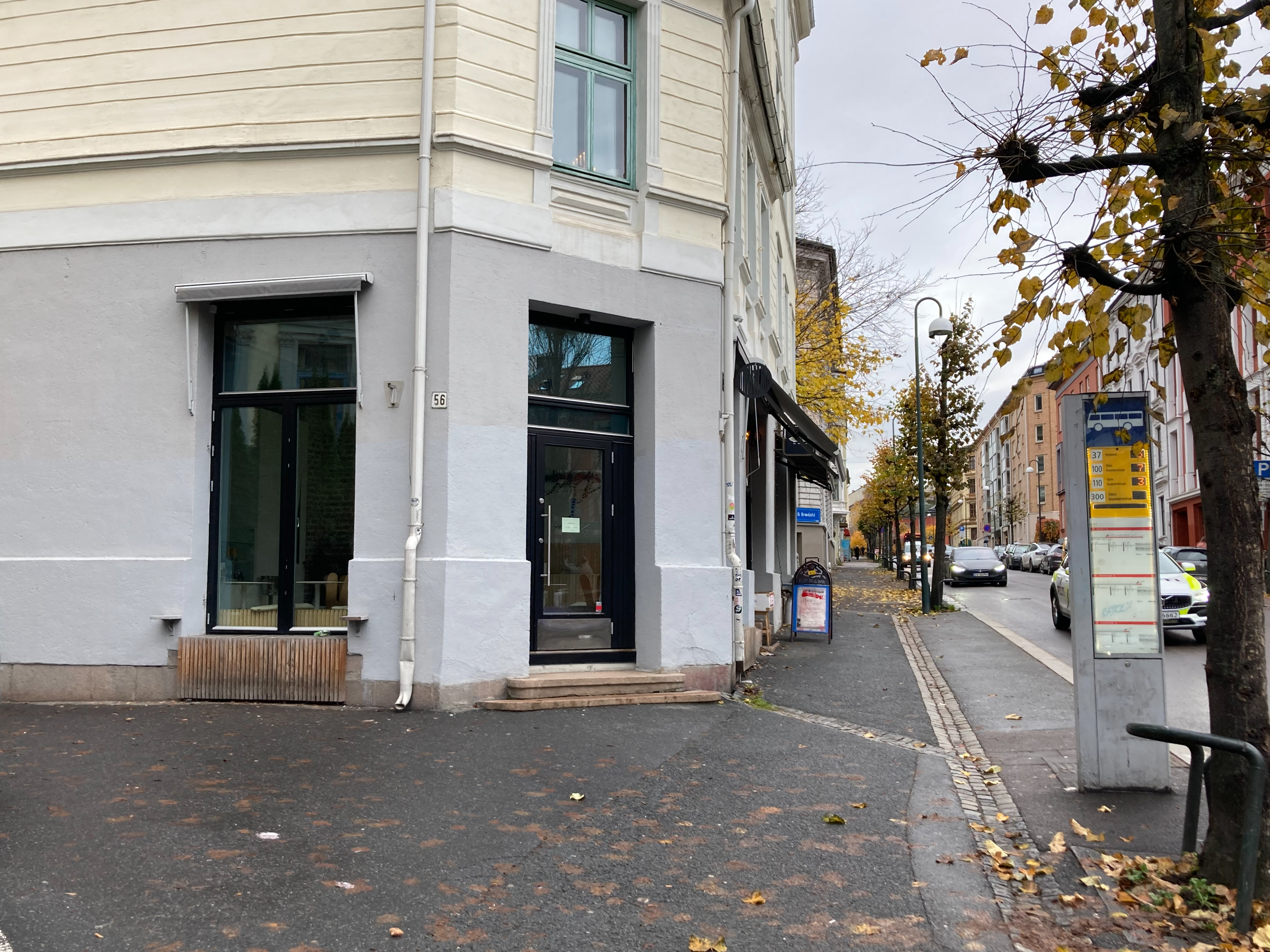
More recent photograph of the location of Helvete, now called Neseblod Records, at Schweigaards Gate 56, Oslo, Norway.

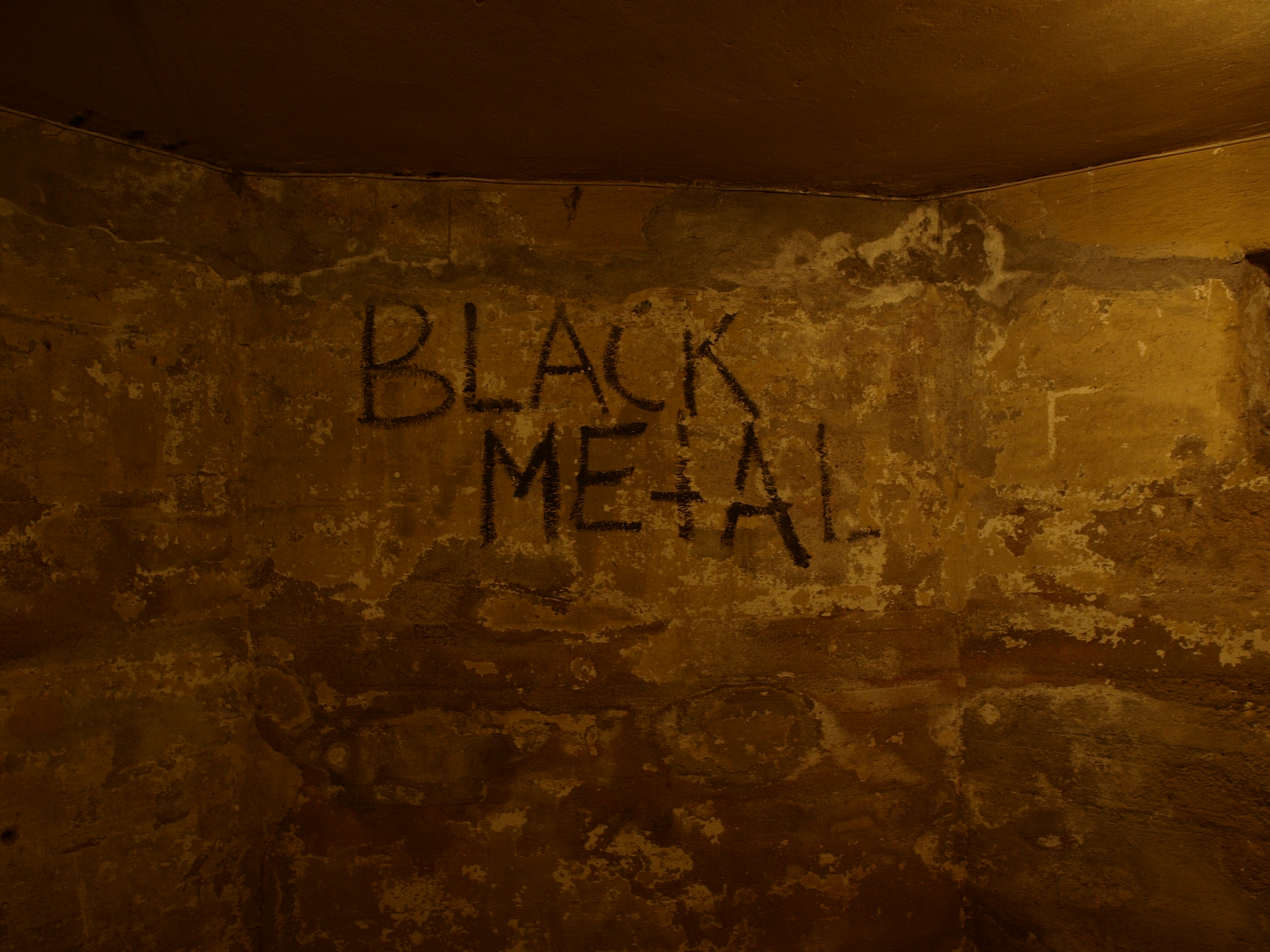
The basement of Euronymous' former record shop, showing graffiti from the early 1990s

During May–June 1991, Euronymous opened a record shop named "Helvete" (Norwegian for "hell") at Schweigaards gate 56 in Oslo. Norwegian black metal musicians often met in the shop's basement, including the two members of Mayhem, the members of Emperor, Varg "Count Grishnackh" Vikernes of Burzum, and Snorre "Blackthorn" Ruch of Thorns. Euronymous also started an independent record label called Deathlike Silence Productions, which was based at Helvete. It released albums by Norwegian bands Mayhem and Burzum, and Swedish bands Merciless and Abruptum. Euronymous, Varg and Emperor guitarist Tomas "Samoth" Haugen all lived at Helvete at various times. Emperor drummer Faust also lived and worked there. The shop's walls were painted black and bedecked with medieval weapons, posters of bands and picture discs, while its window featured a polystyrene tombstone.

According to Occultus, the space that Euronymous rented "was far too big and the rent was too high. That's the reason why it never did well". Only a small part of the building was used for the shop itself. Nevertheless, it became the focal point of the Norwegian black metal scene. Metalion, writer of the fanzine Slayer, said that the opening of Helvete was "the creation of the whole Norwegian Black Metal scene". Daniel Ekeroth wrote in 2008,

Within just a few months [of Helvete opening], many young musicians had become obsessed with Euronymous and his ideas, and soon a lot of Norwegian death metal bands transformed into black metal bands. Amputation became Immortal, Thou Shalt Suffer turned into Emperor, and Darkthrone swapped their Swedish-inspired death metal for primitive black metal. Most notoriously, Old Funeral's guitar player Kristian (later renamed as Varg) Vikernes had already left the band to form his own creation, Burzum.

Euronymous helped many younger bands in the scene, especially Emperor and Enslaved, both of whom he recommended to Candlelight Records. Ihsahn of Emperor said that "if you were trusted, if they knew you were serious in your views, you were accepted" by the Helvete scene. Euronymous took Vikernes, who was five years younger than him, under his wing: inviting him to play bass with Mayhem and offering to release his music as Burzum. However, it has been claimed that their friendship turned to rivalry. Looking back, Faust said: "It sounds really silly, but I think there was a little bit of a contest between them to see who could be more evil. It created a very difficult situation, especially for Euronymous, who wanted the glamour and the showbiz. With him, there was a lot of smoke but not so much fire".

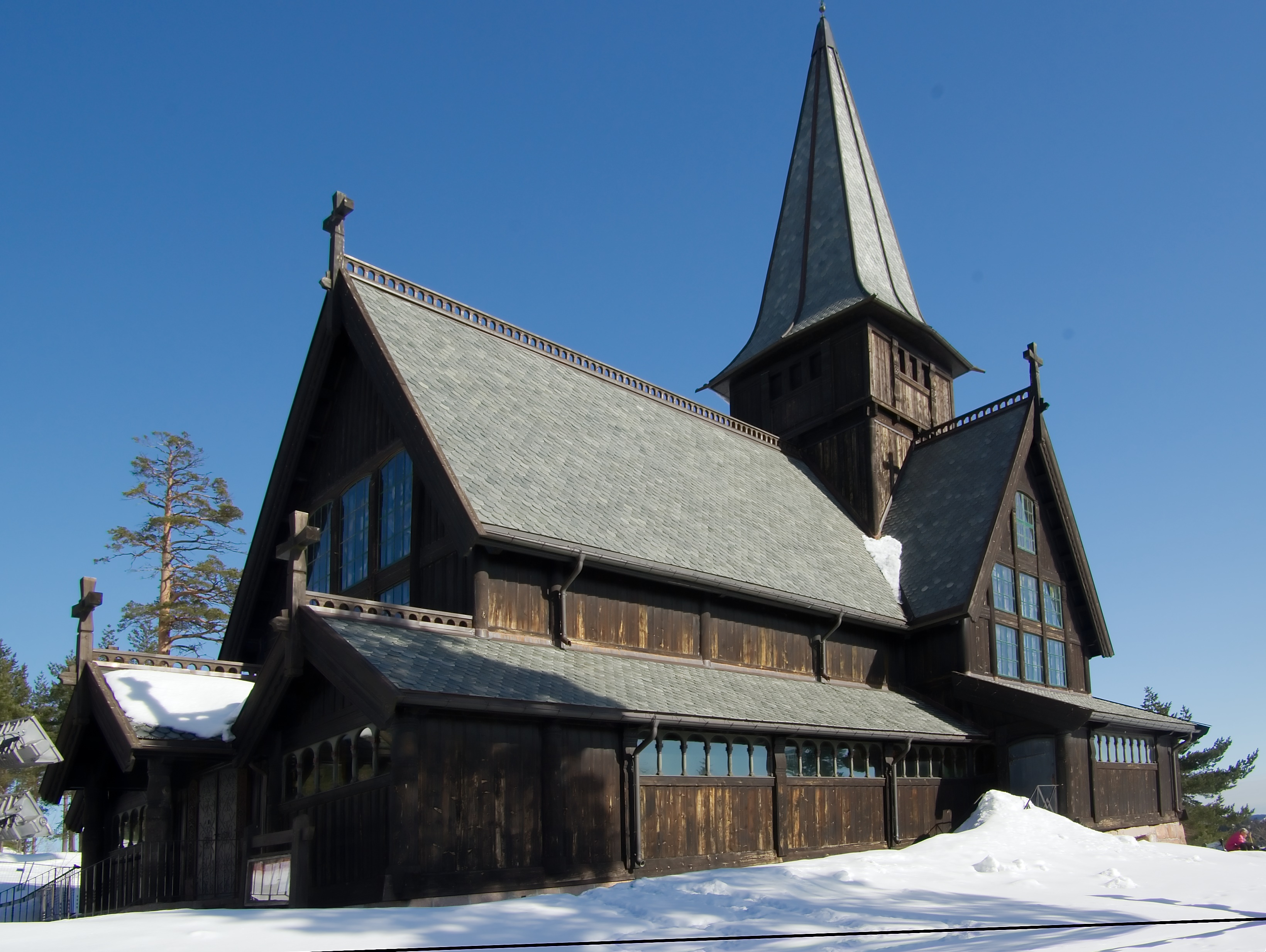
Euronymous took part in the burning of Holmenkollen Chapel (pictured)

On 6 June 1992, the Fantoft Stave Church in Bergen was destroyed by arson. Vikernes was strongly suspected as the culprit but was never convicted. There followed a wave of church burnings across Norway perpetrated by musicians and fans of the Norwegian black metal scene. Euronymous was present at the burning of Holmenkollen Chapel together with Vikernes and Faust, who were convicted for the arson after Euronymous was dead. Faust says he believes that Euronymous got involved because he "felt he had to prove that he could be a part of it and not just in the background". To coincide with the release of Mayhem's De Mysteriis Dom Sathanas, Vikernes and Euronymous had allegedly plotted to bomb Nidaros Cathedral, which appears on the album cover. Euronymous' death in August 1993 put an end to this plan and stalled the album's release. In a 1993 interview on a Swedish radio show, Euronymous said of the church burnings:

They [Christians] must feel that there is a dark, evil power present that they have to fight, which…will make them more extreme. We also believe that when a church burns it's not only Christians who suffer, but people in general. Imagine a beautiful old stave church...what happens when it burns? The Christians feel despair, God's house is destroyed and ordinary people will suffer from grief because something beautiful was destroyed. So you end up spreading grief and despair, which is a good thing.

In January 1993, an article in one of Norway's biggest newspapers, Bergens Tidende, brought the black metal scene into the media spotlight. Varg Vikernes (using his pseudonym Count Grishnackh) gave an anonymous interview to a journalist from the newspaper, in which he claimed to have burnt the churches and killed a man in Lillehammer. According to Vikernes, the anonymous interview was planned by himself and Euronymous. The goal, he says, was to scare people, promote black metal and get more customers for Helvete. He added that the interview revealed nothing that could prove his involvement in any crime. However, by the time the article was printed, Vikernes had already been arrested. Some of the other scene members were also arrested and questioned, but all were released for lack of evidence. Vikernes himself was released in March 1993, also for lack of evidence. That month, Kerrang! published an article about the Norwegian black metal scene. In it, Euronymous and Vikernes presented themselves as leaders of a militant, cult-like group of "Satanic terrorists". Euronymous claimed that Helvete helps fund its activities, but said that he is not directly involved in its crimes, because if he were caught the organization would fall apart.

After the Bergens Tidende episode, Euronymous decided to shut Helvete as it began to draw the attention of the police and media. Vikernes and the authors of Lords of Chaos claim that Euronymous' parents pressured him into shutting Helvete.

=== Murder ===
In early 1993, animosity arose between Euronymous and Vikernes, as well as between Euronymous and some members of the Swedish black metal scene.

On the night of 10 August 1993, Vikernes stabbed Euronymous to death at his apartment in Oslo. The murder was initially blamed on Swedish black metallers by the media. It has been speculated that the murder was the result of a power struggle, a financial dispute over Burzum records (Euronymous owed Vikernes a large sum of royalty payments), or an attempt at "outdoing" the stabbing in Lillehammer. Vikernes claims that he killed Euronymous in self-defense. He says that Euronymous had plotted to stun him with an electroshock weapon, tie him up, and torture him to death while videotaping the event. Vikernes explains: "If he was talking about it to everybody and anybody I wouldn't have taken it seriously. But he just told a select group of friends, and one of them told me". He said Euronymous planned to use a meeting about an unsigned contract to ambush him.

On the night of the murder, Vikernes and Snorre "Blackthorn" Ruch drove from Bergen to Euronymous' apartment at Tøyengata in Oslo. Blackthorn stood outside smoking while Vikernes climbed the stairs to Euronymous' apartment on the fourth floor. Vikernes said he met Euronymous at the door to hand him the signed contract, but when he stepped forward and confronted Euronymous, Euronymous "panicked" and kicked him in the chest. Vikernes claims Euronymous ran into the kitchen to fetch a knife. The two got into a struggle and Vikernes stabbed Euronymous to death. His body was found in the stairwell on the first floor with 23 stab wounds—two to the head, five to the neck, and 16 to the back. Vikernes contends that most of Euronymous' wounds were caused by broken glass he had fallen on during the struggle. After the murder, Vikernes and Blackthorn drove back to Bergen. On the way, they stopped at a lake where Vikernes disposed of his bloodstained clothes. This claim of self-defense is doubted by Faust, while Necrobutcher believes Vikernes killed Euronymous due to the death threats he received from him. Necrobutcher has claimed that he also intended to murder Euronymous himself due to him tastelessly capitalizing on Dead's suicide.

Blackthorn claims Vikernes planned to murder Euronymous and pressured him into coming along. He claims that, in the summer of 1993, he was almost committed to a mental hospital but fled to Bergen and stayed with Vikernes. Blackthorn said of the murder, "I was neither for nor against it. I didn't give a shit about Øystein". Vikernes, however, claims that he had not planned the killing and that Blackthorn came along to show Euronymous some new guitar riffs.

==== Aftermath ====
Vikernes was arrested on 19 August 1993 in Bergen. Many other members of the scene, including Blackthorn and Faust, were also taken in for questioning. The trial began on 2 May 1994. At the trial, it was claimed that Vikernes, Blackthorn, and another friend had planned the murder. The third person stayed at the apartment in Bergen as an alibi. To make it look like they never left Bergen, he was to rent films, play them in the apartment, and withdraw money from Vikernes' credit card. On 16 May 1994, Vikernes was sentenced to 21 years in prison (Norway's maximum penalty) for the murder of Euronymous, the arson of three churches, the attempted arson of a fourth church, and for the theft and storage of 150 kg of explosives. However, he only confessed to the latter. Two churches were burnt the day he was sentenced, "presumably as a statement of symbolic support". Blackthorn was sentenced to 8 years in prison for being an accomplice. Vikernes was released from prison on parole in 2009.

At Euronymous' funeral, Hellhammer (Mayhem's drummer) and Necrobutcher (Mayhem's former bassist) decided to continue with the band and worked on releasing the De Mysteriis Dom Sathanas album. Before the release, Euronymous' family asked Hellhammer to remove the bass tracks recorded by Vikernes. Hellhammer said: "I thought it was appropriate that the murderer and victim were on the same record. I put word out that I was rerecording the bass parts, but I never did". The album, which has Euronymous on electric guitar and Vikernes on bass guitar, was finally released in May 1994.

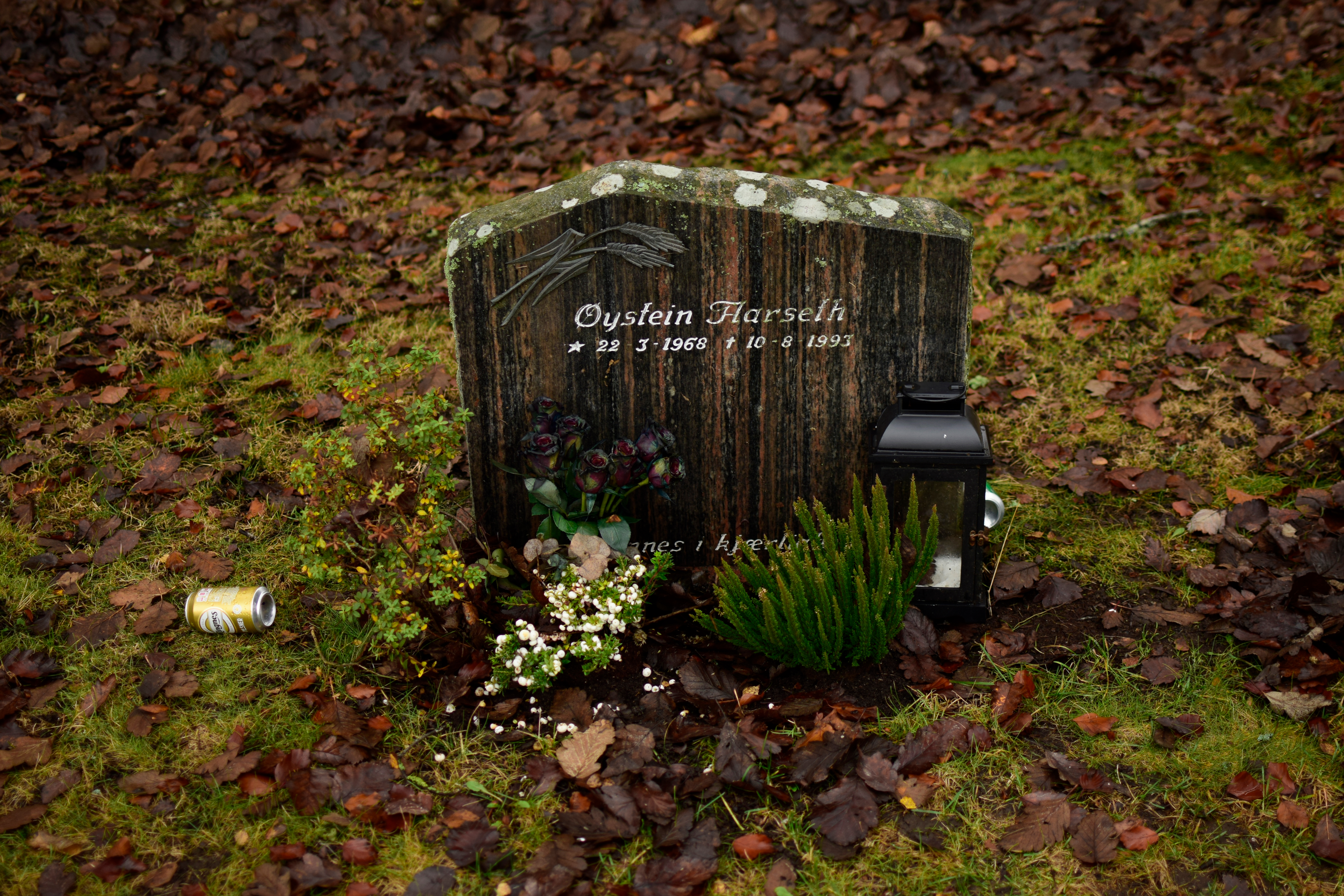
Euronymous' grave in Ski Kirkegaard, Norway.

A part of the Norwegian scene considered Vikernes a traitor for murdering Euronymous and turning his back on Satanism in favor of nationalism and Odinism, although Vikernes claims he was never a Satanist and had only used Satan to provoke. They saw Euronymous' death as a significant loss to the scene, and some black metallers "have sworn to avenge Aarseth's death". A few years after the murder, Ihsahn of Emperor said, "There's no discipline in the scene anymore, like earlier on around the shop." After his death, a "cult developed around the memory of Euronymous", and he was hailed by some as "the King" or "Godfather of Black Metal."

A new generation of musicians also tried to gain credibility by riding on the back of his legacy. However, many of Euronymous' friends and bandmates "speak of the killing with a tone of indifference." Lords of Chaos remarks: "what is striking [...] is how little they care about the lives or deaths of one another." In the book, Hellhammer, Ihsahn and Samoth claim that Euronymous' death either did not affect them or did not shock them. Anders Odden (a friend of Euronymous at the time) said of the murder: "It wasn't odd that he ended up getting killed. He thought he could threaten to kill people without it having any consequences". He added: "I think many people felt relief once he was gone". Writer and musician Erlend Erichsen agreed, saying, "Nobody was there to boss them about. The 'black metal police' were gone".

== Beliefs and personality ==
The book Lords of Chaos says of Euronymous:

He was always dressed in black from head to foot, his hair dyed black for added effect. He sported long, aristocratic mustaches and wore knee-high boots. His black leather biker jacket was decorated with badges [...] When talking, he seemed stern and serious, sometimes with pomposity verging on the theatrical".

In interviews, Euronymous claimed to be against individualism, compassion, peace, happiness and fun. He claimed he wanted to spread hatred, sorrow and evil. In a 1992 interview, he said "The hardcore [punk] pigs have correctly made themselves guardians of morality, but we must kick them in the face and become guardians of anti-morality". The following year, he told Kill Yourself zine, "There is NOTHING which is too sick, evil or perverted" and claimed "I have no problem with killing someone in cold blood". Metalion (who knew Euronymous since 1985 and considered him his best friend) said Euronymous "was always telling what he thought, following his own instincts [...] worshipping death and being extreme". Euronymous' shop attracted a lot of new young fans, many of whom looked up to and even idolized him.

However, some who knew Euronymous claim that "the extreme Satanic image he projected was, in fact, just that—a projection which bore little resemblance to his real personality". They include Necrobutcher, Kjetil Manheim, Vikernes and Blackthorn. Faust said that with Euronymous, "there was a lot of smoke but not so much fire". When asked why Euronymous made such extreme statements to the press, Ihsahn said: "I think that was very much to create fear among people". He added that the scene "wanted to be in opposition to society" and "tried to concentrate more on just being 'evil' than having a real Satanic philosophy". Mayhem drummer Kjetil Manheim (Euronymous' friend from 1983 until his death) described him as "health oriented ... A nice guy, a family guy", but said that when his older friends were not around, "he could play out his role". Manheim claimed that Euronymous became "extreme" towards the end of his life: "He liked telling people that they were worthless; that he was the best. He was all 'I define black metal. Black metal is me!' ... I think he was trapped in the image of Mayhem. He became a megalomaniac". In the documentary Pure Fucking Mayhem, he said "Øystein's daily life was a total theater" that was based on the black metal "archetype" of Euronymous.

=== Religion ===
In interviews, Euronymous said he was a theistic Satanist. In an interview by Esa Lahdenperä conducted in August 1993, Euronymous stated:

I believe in a horned devil, a personified Satan. In my opinion all the other forms of Satanism are bullshit. [...] Satanism comes from religious Christianity, and there it shall stay. I'm a religious person and I will fight those who misuse His name. People are not supposed to believe in themselves and be individualists. They are supposed to OBEY, to be the SLAVES of religion.

The theistic Satanism espoused by Euronymous was an inversion of Roman Catholic dogma, and he claimed "We praise the evil and we believe blindly in a godly creature just like a Christian". On the relationship between religion and science, he said: "Scientists can't disprove [...] religion. No matter how hard you try, you can't explain the universe. You can't leave out a religious belief."

He opposed the Satanic and occultist teachings of Anton LaVey and Aleister Crowley, for unlike Euronymous, they promoted what he saw as "peace" and commercial frivolity, as well as individualism in contrast to dogma. He said he would "never accept any band which preaches Church of Satan ideas, as they are just a bunch of freedom and life-loving atheists, and they stand exactly the opposite of me". When asked what he thought of Crowley's code of "do what thou wilt shall be the whole of the law", he answered, "People shall do what WE want them to do. We're against freedom, and forced a band from Rogaland in Norway—Belsebub—to split up."

As noted earlier, some of those who knew Euronymous claim that his "extreme Satanic image" was an act. While Mortiis said that Euronymous "was such a devil worshipper you wouldn't believe it", in the black metal documentary Until the Light Takes Us, Varg Vikernes claimed that Euronymous was not a Satanist. He said: "To Aarseth everything was about image and he wanted to appear extreme. He wanted people to think of him as being extreme; the most extreme of them all. But he didn't want to be extreme and he wasn't really extreme". While Metalion, who was friends with both Vikernes and Euronymous when the latter died, and called Euronymous his best friend, wrote that "some people in our scene read a few books and considered themselves Satanists", he made no such statements about Euronymous. Tenebris (allegedly Jon Nödtveidt) from the Misanthropic Luciferian Order, a Swedish Satanic order formed in 1995, wrote that "back then, in 1991, things mainly concerned black metal and ideological Satanism [...] and kind of stood and fell with Euronymous and his shop. Therefore, it vanished with his death in '93".

Over time, some members of the Norwegian scene began to follow Paganism. Vikernes later claimed that Euronymous—"obsessed with this 'Satanist' thing"—disapproved of Vikernes promoting paganism. Euronymous showed no explicit disapproval of paganism though, and released the pagan band Enslaved's first album, Vikingligr Veldi, on Deathlike Silence Productions.

=== Black metal and death metal ===
Euronymous said that the term "black metal" can apply to any kind of metal so long as it is "Satanic" and "heavy". He said, "If a band cultivates and worships Satan, it's black metal", and that "in a way, it can be ordinary heavy metal or just noise. What's important is that it's Satanic; that's what makes it black metal". He rejected bands like Immortal being called black metal, "as they are not Satanists", but supported the band nonetheless. As noted earlier, bands who had LaVeyan beliefs were also rejected. When it was pointed out that Venom (the band that coined the term "black metal") only used Satanism as a gimmick, Euronymous said that he and the Black Circle "choose to believe otherwise".

Likewise, Euronymous said that the term death metal can apply to any kind of metal, so long as the band "cultivates and worships death". Euronymous lamented the commercialization and loss of extremity within death metal. He said "Real Death Metal should be something normal people are afraid of, not something mothers can listen to", and "Death Metal is for brutal people who are capable of killing, it's not for idiotic children who want to have [a] funny hobby after school". Shortly after Dead's suicide, he penned an open letter criticizing bands that he perceived to be not "metal enough," including, but not limited to, Deicide.

Like many others in the black metal scene, Euronymous originally believed that black metal should stay underground. However, he later changed his mind. He believed that the idea of staying underground came from hardcore punk, and said, "Those who scream most about being in 'underground' is also often those who make so bad music that they don't have a chance to get big themselves". He added: "I wouldn't mind making DSP big and earn a million, as long as I don't change my ways of thinking and being. [...] If there were one million black metal fans in the world, most of them would be jerks, but there would be really many true and brutal people as well. The bigger we get, the more we can manipulate people into thinking like us".

=== Politics ===
Euronymous was interested in totalitarian communist states such as the Soviet Union under Stalin and the People's Socialist Republic of Albania. He collected Eastern Bloc memorabilia, and in the 1980s, he was a member of the Norwegian communist youth group Rød Ungdom, which was Marxist–Leninist at the time. He left Rød Ungdom, allegedly because he came to realise that they were "just a bunch of humanists". He said "as I hate people I don't want them to have a good time, I'd like to see them rot under communist dictatorship". He had a fascination with the idea of mass surveillance, secret police and forced disappearance. Mayhem's Attila Csihar said Euronymous was not a communist "in the political sense" but was fascinated by the power communist dictators had over their people.

Hellhammer said "Euronymous wanted to be the most extreme person, and he thought that communism was very extreme", but that he later claimed to be a fascist. In a private letter written in the early 1990s, Euronymous claimed that "almost all" Norwegian black metal bands at the time were "more or less Nazis", including Mayhem. He did not, however, use the music of Mayhem to promote any kind of politics.

== Instruments ==
Euronymous' main guitar was a sunburst Gibson Les Paul Standard guitar, which he can be seen playing in many pictures. He played through a slightly modified 1981 Marshall Super Lead amplifier and used a Boss SD-1 Super Overdrive pedal, as well as a Boss HM-2 Heavy Metal pedal.

== Influences ==
He stated in various interviews that his and Mayhem's main influences were Venom, Bathory, Hellhammer, Sodom and Destruction, whilst he also liked Iron Maiden, Kiss, Celtic Frost, Dio and Metallica.

== Legacy ==
Euronymous is considered one of the creators of Norwegian black metal's guitar style, alongside Snorre "Blackthorn" Ruch of Stigma Diabolicum/Thorns. In the documentary Helvete: Historien om norsk black metal, Snorre Ruch said that Euronymous invented a new tremolo picking technique that enabled them to play the iconic black metal "Norse riff". This method involves slowly moving up and down a chord while applying tremolo picking to each string, similar to an arpeggio. He was also ranked No. 51 out of The 100 Greatest Heavy Metal Guitarists of All Time by Guitar World. In 2025, Jillian Drachman of Loudwire referred to him as "one of the movement's most important architects, crediting Aarseth for inventing the black metal style of tremolo picking and sharing it with others.

In March 2012, low-cost carrier Norwegian Air Shuttle set up a public poll asking customers to pick a famous Norwegian historic figure whose picture would decorate the aircraft's tail fin. Largely on the strength of international fans, Aarseth was leading the poll, but his name was removed from the campaign at his family's request.

The 2018 film Lords of Chaos, based on the eponymous book, is a semi-fictionalised account of the early 1990s Norwegian black metal scene told from the perspective of Euronymous. In the film Euronymous is played by Rory Culkin.

== Discography ==
Euronymous played guitar on the following albums except where noted, any additional instruments or credits in notes.

Band	Title	Recorded	Released	Notes
Mayhem	Pure Fucking Armageddon	1986	1986	
Checker Patrol	Metalion in the Park	1986	1986	
Mayhem	Deathrehearsal	1987	1987	
Mayhem	Deathcrush	1987	1987	
Mayhem	Live in Leipzig	1990	1993	
Burzum	Burzum	1992	1992	Co-producer. Guitar solo on "War" and gong on "Dungeons of Darkness" only. Only credited on original pressing.
Mayhem	Out from the Dark	1989	1996	Posthumous
Mayhem	Freezing Moon/Carnage	1990	1996	Posthumous
Mayhem	De Mysteriis Dom Sathanas	1992–1993	1994	Posthumous
Mayhem	The Dawn of the Black Hearts	1990	1995	Posthumous. Guitar and album artwork.

== Bibliography ==
- Dyrendal, Asbjørn (2016). "Satanism in Norway". In Bogdan, Henrik; Hammer, Olav (eds.). Western Esotericism in Scandinavia. Brill Esotericism Reference Library. Leiden: Brill Publishers. pp. 481–488. ISBN 978-90-04-30241-9. ISSN 2468-3566.
- Introvigne, Massimo (2016). "Satan the Musician: Black Metal and Satanism". Satanism: A Social History. Leiden: Brill Publishers. pp. 462–501. ISBN 978-90-04-28828-7.
- Kristiansen, Jon (2011). Metalion: The Slayer Mag Diaries. Bazillion Points Books. ISBN 9780979616341.
- Moynihan, Michael; Søderlind, Didrik (2003) [1998]. Lords of Chaos: The Bloody Rise of the Satanic Metal Underground (Revised and expanded ed.). Port Townsend, Washington: Feral House. ISBN 0-922915-94-6.
