= The Dawn of the Black Hearts =

- 2017 re-issue cover, under Live in Sarpsborg

Live album (bootleg) by Mayhem
- Released: February 17, 1995
- Recorded: 28 February 1990 in Sarpsborg, Norway
- Genre: Black metal
- Length: 37:57
- Label: Warmaster Records

Mayhem chronology
De Mysteriis Dom Sathanas (1994)	The Dawn of the Black Hearts (1995)	Out from the Dark (1996)

The Dawn of the Black Hearts (Note: The original pressing has "The" at the beginning of the title. Some later editions omit it.) (subtitled Live in Sarpsborg, Norway 28/2, 1990) is a bootleg live album by the Norwegian black metal band Mayhem. The title originates from a line of lyrics Fenriz of Darkthrone wrote for the band. (Note: The lyrics sheet can be found in the 2009 limited edition EP, Life Eternal.)

Despite being a bootleg, the album is sometimes listed as one of the band's most important albums, mainly due to the notoriety regarding the original cover art, which is an image of Mayhem vocalist Per "Dead" Ohlin shortly after he committed suicide. It has been called "arguably the most controversial album cover in extreme metal history."

== Background ==
The bootleg is a recording of a live show that took place on 28 February 1990 in Sarpsborg, Norway. Metalion, an early figure in the scene who helped to organise this show, claimed that there were around 300 people in attendance and the members of Darkthrone and Immortal were present as well.

== Cover ==
The album is infamous and controversial for bearing a photograph of vocalist Dead (Per Yngve Ohlin), shortly after his suicide on 8 April 1991. The photograph was taken by guitarist Euronymous (Øystein Aarseth), shortly after he entered the house the band shared and discovered the body.

Bull Metal, a penpal of Euronymous and owner of Warmaster Records, was sent a copy of one of the photos Euronymous had taken of Dead's corpse which ended up becoming the cover image. Euronymous had taken additional pictures of Dead's body in different positions (one of them with Dead "sitting half up, with the shotgun on his knee" not used as cover), but these photos were found and destroyed by Euronymous's father after he was murdered in 1993, which was two years before The Dawn of the Black Hearts was released.

== Release ==
According to Metalion, the bootleg was made and released by an individual from South America. It has been claimed that this was Mauricio "Bull Metal" Montoya from the Colombian metal scene, who is further claimed to have been a pen-pal of Euronymous at the time. The latter is said to have given Bull Metal the photographs, which were used for the first printings of the bootleg in South America. All of these claims are unsubstantiated.

Metal music historian Dayal Patterson has referred to the record as "perhaps the most bootlegged black metal release of all time." The bootleg was the gateway to discovering Dead-era Mayhem for a number of later black metal musicians, such as Black Emperor of Colombia's Supremacía Satánica, D of Indonesia's Warkvlt, and Semjaza of Greece's Thy Darkened Shade.

The Dawn of the Black Hearts was officially reissued in 2017 on vinyl under the name Live in Sarpsborg, using a photo of Necrobutcher as a new cover. This 2017 release uses improved audio from a separate master source recording of the concert.

== Track listing ==
The original track listing (recorded in 1990 with Dead as vocalist and Hellhammer as drummer):

No.	Title	Length
1.	"Deathcrush"	3:36
2.	"Necrolust"	4:19
3.	"Funeral Fog"	6:38
4.	"Freezing Moon"	6:06
5.	"Carnage"	4:18
6.	"Buried by Time and Dust"	5:46
7.	"Chainsaw Gutsfuck"	3:59
8.	"Pure Fucking Armageddon"	3:15
Total length:		37:57

Extra songs included on many reissues (recorded in 1985 with Messiah as vocalist and Manheim as drummer):

No.	Title	Length
9.	"Danse Macabre" (Celtic Frost cover)	1:10
10.	"Black Metal" (Venom cover)	3:00
11.	"Procreation of the Wicked" (Celtic Frost cover)	2:40
12.	"Welcome to Hell" (Venom cover)	3:46
Total length:		48:30

- Some of the reissues with bonus songs combine "Danse Macabre" and "Black Metal" in one track.
- Certain versions containing the bonus song mistitle "Danse Macabre" as "Dance Macabre".

== Personnel ==
Lineup on original release:

- Dead (Per Yngve Ohlin) – vocals
- Euronymous (Øystein Aarseth) – guitar
- Necrobutcher (Jørn Stubberud) – bass
- Hellhammer (Jan Axel Blomberg) – drums

Re-release bonus tracks lineup:

- Messiah (Eirik Nordheim) – vocals
- Euronymous (Øystein Aarseth) – guitar
- Necrobutcher (Jørn Stubberud) – bass
- Manheim (Kjetil Manheim) – drums

== See also ==
- Mayhem discography
