= Grymyrk =

Demo album by Thorns
- Released: June 1991
- Recorded: 3 June 1991
- Genre: Black metal
- Length: 26:06
- Label: No label (independent)
- Producer: Snorre W. Ruch

Thorns chronology
Grymyrk (1991)	Trøndertun (1992)

Professional ratings
Review scores
Source	Rating
About.com	favorable

Grymyrk is an instrumental demo released by early Norwegian black metal band Thorns. It was recorded in June 1991 and released in the same month. Ruch took some of these guitar riffs from his own ep and were given to Euronymous for Mayhems album "De Mysteriis Dom Sathanas" which was released in 1994.

== Track listing ==
No.	Title	Length
1.	"Lovely Children"	3:29
2.	"Fall"	2:20
3.	"Thule"	6:52
4.	"Fairytales"	4:02
5.	"Home"	6:43
6.	"You That Mingle May"	2:40
Total length:		26:06

Note: The track "Lovely Children" is a re-recording of "Into the Promised Land" from the Luna de Nocturnus demo. The track "Home" has a melody that was inspired by Alphaville's "A Victory of Love".

== Personnel ==
- Snorre W. Ruch – electric guitar
- Harald Eilertsen – bass guitar
