= Anthony De La Torre =

American actor

Anthony de la Torre
- Born: November 24, 1993 (age 32); Bowling Green, Ohio, U.S.
- Occupation: Actor
- Years active: 2008–present
- Spouse: Lana Condor (m. 2024)

Anthony De La Torre (born November 24, 1993) is an American actor, known for his roles as young Jack Sparrow in Pirates of the Caribbean: Dead Men Tell No Tales (2017) and Jan Axel Blomberg in Lords of Chaos (2018).

== Early life ==
De La Torre was born in Bowling Green, Ohio, to Cuban parents. His mother, Esther Garcia, is a Spanish teacher at Bowling Green High School, and also owns a cleaning business. His parents divorced shortly after De La Torre's birth. He has one older brother, Nicolas, and one older sister, Angelica. De La Torre attended St. Aloysius Elementary and Junior High School in Bowling Green, before enrolling in online schooling via Ohio Virtual Academy.

As a teen, De La Torre performed as a Justin Bieber impersonator, for which he would make between $300 and $600 an hour, and also worked for his mother's cleaning business. In 2012, he moved to Nashville, Tennessee, to work on a music project with songwriter and producer Desmond Child. The following year, he moved to Los Angeles, California.

== Career ==
De La Torre began his acting career with a voice role in Go, Diego, Go! as Willie the Whistling Duck, for which he was credited as Antonio Cabrera. He also appeared in a print advertisement for Del Monte ketchup. He had a recurring role in two episodes of Nickelodeon's 100 Things to Do Before High School, portraying a Latino actor named Anthony Del Rey.

De La Torre starred as the young Jack Sparrow in the 2017 blockbuster fantasy film Pirates of the Caribbean: Dead Men Tell No Tales, directed by Joachim Rønning and Espen Sandberg. His appearance as the character was merged with Johnny Depp's via CGI. In July 2017, he replaced Toby Rand as the frontman for The Fell, a rock band consisting of Mike Krompass, Randy Cooke, and Billy Sheehan.

He portrayed Jan Axel Blomberg / Hellhammer in Jonas Åkerlund's thriller Lords of Chaos, alongside Rory Culkin, Emory Cohen and Jack Kilmer. De La Torre also appeared as Hellhammer in the music video for Metallica's "ManUNkind". The film premiered at the 2018 Sundance Film Festival. De La Torre starred in the title role in the low budget horror film Johnny Gruesome, directed by Greg Lamberson.

== Personal life ==
Since August 2015, De La Torre has been in a relationship with actress Lana Condor. They became engaged in December 2021 while on vacation in Mexico, and were married in 2024 in an intimate ceremony in Malibu, California.

== Filmography ==
=== Film ===
Year	Title	Role	Notes
2017	Pirates of the Caribbean: Dead Men Tell No Tales	Young Jack Sparrow	
2018	Lords of Chaos	Jan Axel Blomberg	
2018	Johnny Gruesome	Johnny Grissom	

=== Television ===
Year	Title	Role	Notes
2008	Go, Diego, Go!	Willie the Whistling Duck	2 episodes
2015–2016	100 Things to Do Before High School	Anthony Del Rey	2 episodes
2018	Vida	Jackson	Episode 4
2019	Goliath	Rob	Episode: "Conscious Uncoupling"
2022	Boo, Bitch	Mo	3 episodes
2022	American Horror Stories	Chaz	Episode: "Drive"
