= Thorns (band) =

Norwegian black metal band

- Also known as: Stigma Diabolicum
- Origin: Trondheim, Norway
- Genres: Black metal; electronic
- Years active: 1989–present
- Label: Moonfog

Thorns, also known as Stigma Diabolicum, is a Norwegian black metal band that formed in 1989 and was part of the early Norwegian black metal scene. They made two highly influential demos in the early 1990s, Grymyrk and Trøndertun, but have only released one full-length album.

== History ==
In 1989, Snorre Westvold Ruch (born January 21, 1972), also known under the stage name Blackthorn, and Marius Vold formed the band Stigma Diabolicum and recorded one demo. In 1990, bass player Harald Eilertsen and drummer Bård "Faust" Eithun joined. As the use of Latin within black metal "had escalated" (according to the Stigma Diabolicum re-release booklet), the name was changed to Thorns in 1991. The same year, Eilertsen and Ruch recorded the Grymyrk demo, which had a great impact on the black metal scene and, together with Mayhem guitarist Euronymous, coined the Norwegian black metal riffing, as Darkthrone drummer Fenriz points out. As the band members were "spread far across Norway", they could rarely rehearse; some of the rehearsals were recorded on tape. In 1992, the Trøndertun demo was recorded. The same year, Ruch became Mayhem's second guitarist and disbanded Thorns for a few months.

In 1994, Ruch was sentenced to 8 years in prison for admitting to being an accomplice in the murder of Euronymous. However, according to Euronymous's murderer, Varg Vikernes, Ruch was merely "in the wrong place at the wrong time".

After a long period of silence due to Ruch's imprisonment, Thorns reappeared in 1999 with the split album Thorns vs. Emperor, consisting mainly of old Thorns songs performed by Emperor and vice versa. Then, in 2001, the debut album Thorns was released, with Hellhammer on drums and vocals by Satyr and Dødheimsgard's Aldrahn.

In October 2007, Greek label Kyrck Productions released the Stigma Diabolicum compilation, which featured both the Grymyrk and Trøndertun demos, as well as material from the Stigma Diabolicum demos Lacus de Luna and Luna de Nocturnus and two tracks ("Thule" and "Fall") from a 1991 Thorns rehearsal.

A follow-up to the 2001 debut was announced in September 2008.

The lineup of Thorns has undergone significant changes since the 2001 album. Snorre is still involved as a guitarist, and Aldrahn has continued to serve as a vocalist. Bassist Jon Wesseltoft, guitarist Christian Broholt, and drummer Kenneth Kapstad have joined the band.

== Members ==
- Snorre Ruch – guitars/keyboards/programming
- Jon Wesseltoft – bass/baritone guitar
- Aldrahn – vocals
- Christian Broholt – guitars
- Kenneth Kapstad – drums

=== Former members ===
- Bård G. Eithun – drums
- Marius Vold – vocals, bass
- Harald Eilertsen – bass on Grymyrk
- Terje Kråbøl – drums on Trøndertun
- Ronny K. Prize – bass on Trøndertun
- Satyr – vocals on Thorns
- Aldrahn – vocals on Thorns
- Hellhammer – drums on Thorns

== Discography ==
Studio albums

- Thorns (2001)

Demos

- Luna De Nocturnus (1989) (as Stigma Diabolicum)
- Lacus De Luna (1990) (as Stigma Diabolicum)
- Grymyrk (1991)
- Trøndertun (1992)
- Thule (1992)

Other releases

- Thorns vs. Emperor (1999) (split with Emperor)
- Stigma Diabolicum (2007) (compilation)

== Related bands ==
Thorns Ltd. is an experimental/drone/art-circuit offshoot of Thorns. The project was started in 2003 by Finn Olav Holthe (of The 3rd and the Mortal), Jon Wesseltoft and Snorre Ruch to explore the aesthetics of sound and its influence on the listener, using multichannel playback systems and various audio preparations.

The band first produced sound for Norwegian visual artist Bjarne Melgaard's works displayed at the Playlist exhibition at the Palais de Tokyo in Paris in 2004. Ruch and Holthe had previously contributed sound to Melgaard's Interface to God exhibition at Kunsthalle zu Kiel in 2002. Thorns Ltd. has later contributed sound to works by New York artist Banks Violette and others.

Holthe left the band in 2006. Ruch and Wesseltoft have continued as Thorns Ltd. in addition to their work in Thorns.

=== See also ===
- Mayhem – band in which Snorre played guitars for a short while. He also wrote some of the riffs on De Mysteriis Dom Sathanas. Also Hellhammer's main band.
- Satyricon – Satyr's primary band.
- Dødheimsgard – band for which Aldrahn performs vocals.
- Burzum – solo project of Varg Vikernes who was imprisoned along with Snorre for the murder of Euronymous.
