= Didrik Søderlind =

Norwegian skeptic (born 1971)

Didrik Schjerven Søderlind (born March 13, 1971) is a Norwegian secular humanist and skeptic who works as a journalist and author. He works as an advisor for the Norwegian Humanist Association and has previously been a journalist for forskning.no with science, religion, and culture as primary areas of interest. He has published monographs of his own as well as contributed to anthologies, especially about lifestance and skepticism.

In 2015, Søderlind together with the priest Stian Kilde Aarebrot published the book Presten og ateisten (The Priest and the Atheist) in which the two through correspondence discuss faith and doubt through the perspectives of their different lifestances.

== Published literature ==
- (with Michael J. Moynihan) Lords of Chaos: The Bloody Rise of the Satanic Metal Underground, 1998 ISBN 0922915482 — winner of a 1999 Firecracker Alternative Book Award
- Kristen-Norge. En oppdagelsesreise, 2010 ISBN 978-82-430-0458-0
- (with Stian Kilde Aarebrot) Presten og ateisten, 2015 ISBN 978-82-828-2104-9
