= Fallen (Burzum album) =

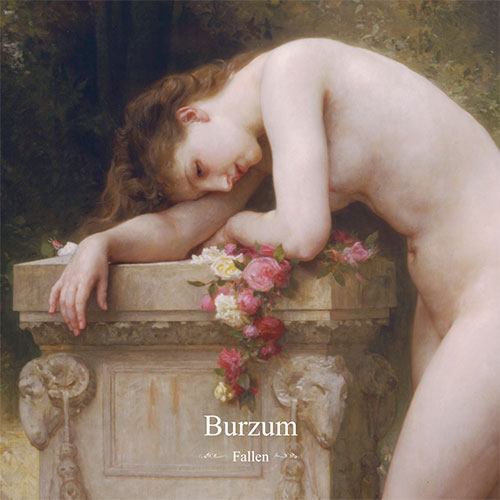

Studio album by Burzum
- Released: 7 March 2011
- Recorded: November 2010
- Genre: Black metal
- Length: 47:41
- Label: Byelobog Productions

Burzum chronology
Belus (2010)	Fallen (2011)	From the Depths of Darkness (2011)

Fallen is the eighth studio album by the Norwegian artist Burzum, released on 7 March 2011 through Byelobog Productions.

The cover art is taken from the painting Elegy (1899) by French painter William-Adolphe Bouguereau.

== Recording ==
Fallen was recorded and mixed during two weeks in Grieghallen studios, using a Spector bass with alembic electronics on a Vox AC50 amp from 1965, a Ludwig drum kit (with a 26-inch kick) from 1975, a Neumann M149 microphone and stereo Schoeps CMTS 501 U microphones for vocals, an OBH Nordica Harmony 6487, a custom Stig instrument and a Peavey 23 guitar on a Peavey 6505 (120 Watt) amp.

== Music and lyrics ==
According to Varg Vikernes himself, "Musically Fallen is like a cross between Belus and something new, inspired more by the debut album and Det som engang var than by Hvis lyset tar oss or Filosofem. The sound is more dynamic – we mastered the album as if it was classical music – and I was more experimental than I was on Belus in all respects. Lyricwise it is similar to the debut album, in the way that it is more personal and focuses on existential issues, but the mythological undertone known from Belus is still there. I have also included some ambient tracks – a short introduction and a longer conclusion".

== Reception ==
Professional ratings
Review scores
Source	Rating
About.com	3.5/5 stars
AllMusic	3/5 stars
The Boston Phoenix	3.5/4 stars

About.com critic Dave Schalek wrote: "Though Fallen is harsh, the viciousness of classic Burzum prior to Vikernes’ incarceration is absent." Schalek also concluded that the record "is probably best viewed as a lateral move from Burzum, and not much more." AllMusic's Eduardo Rivadavia thought that the album's "combination of staying the course and failing to impress when risks are taken ultimately gives it something of a leftover taste and suggests that Varg might want to invest a little more time in conjuring Burzum's next opus." Janssen McCormick of The Boston Phoenix described the album "a feral bookend to another enthralling Burzum album as forward-looking, but far more mature, than Vikernes's pre-incarceration output."

== Track listing ==
All tracks are written by Varg Vikernes

No.	Title	Translation (by Varg Vikernes)	Length
1.	"Fra verdenstreet"	From the World Tree	1:03
2.	"Jeg faller"	I Am Falling	7:50
3.	"Valen"	Fallen	9:21
4.	"Vanvidd"	Madness	7:05
5.	"Enhver til sitt"	Each Man to His Own	6:16
6.	"Budstikken"	The Message	10:09
7.	"Til Hel og tilbake igjen"	To Hel and Back Again	5:57
Total length:			47:41

== Personnel ==
- Varg Vikernes – vocals, all instruments, production
- Pytten – production

== Charts ==
Chart (2011)	Peak position
Finnish Albums (Suomen virallinen lista)	10
Norwegian Albums (VG-lista)	27
