= Belus (album) =

2010 studio album by Burzum

Studio album by Burzum
- Released: 8 March 2010
- Recorded: Late 2009 – early 2010
- Studio: Grieg Hall, Bergen
- Genre: Black metal
- Length: 52:16
- Language: Norwegian
- Label: Byelobog Productions
- Producer: Burzum, Pytten

Burzum chronology
Hliðskjálf (1999)	Belus (2010)	Fallen (2011)

Belus is the seventh full-length album by the Norwegian one-man band Burzum. Released on 8 March 2010 through Byelobog Productions, it is the first Burzum studio album to be recorded after a near 11-year hiatus.

== Background ==
Belus was the first album to be recorded and released after Varg Vikernes' May 2009 parole from prison. He had served almost 16 years of a 21-year murder sentence. The album was originally called "The Return of Baldur", but Vikernes announced the album in November 2009 as Den Hvite Guden ("The White God" in Norwegian). In December 2009, he announced that the name was being changed to Belus because some in the media speculated that the album might have racist undertones. He stated that the former name had nothing to do with skin colour or racism, but that it was merely a common name for the Norse god Baldr.

Vikernes suggests that Belus is the oldest known (Proto-Indo-European) name of the life-death-rebirth deity that is reflected in the Norse Baldr, the Greek Apollo, the Gaulish Belenus and the Slavic Belobog (itself meaning "White God"), among others.

The other Proto-Indo-European theonyms used in the lyrics are "Lukan" (equivalent to the god Loki), "Kaimadalthas" (equivalent to the gods Heimdallr and Hermóðr, which Vikernes believes were initially the same god, Haimaþellar) and "Kelio" (equivalent to the underworld Hel).

== Music ==
The album is just over 50 minutes long. It originally contained nine metal tracks (though this was later reduced to only six metal tracks) and an ambient intro and outro. The song names "Besøk til Kelio", "Alvenes dans" and "Alvegavene" were removed from the track list, as the original was only a "working track list". The album endeavours to explore the ancient European myths about Belus: his death, his journey through the underworld and his return. Although he described modern black metal culture as a "tasteless, low-brow parody" of the early Norwegian black metal scene, Vikernes did not change the style of his music for Belus and likened it to Hvis lyset tar oss and Filosofem. Nevertheless, he claimed to have "evolved" over time. Belus includes two reworked songs: "Total Destruction" from the unreleased Uruk-Hai from 1988–1989 (with lyrics and title changed to fit the album's theme), which became "Sverddans", and "Dauði Baldrs" (which appears on the album of the same name as an ambient song), which became "Belus' død". The album's lyrics are wholly in Norwegian and were uploaded to the official Burzum website.

== Critical reception ==
Professional ratings
Review scores
Source	Rating
AllMusic	3.5/5 stars
Metal Storm	6.9/10

The album garnered mainly mixed/average reviews. AllMusic gave Belus 3.5 stars out of 5. The AllMusic reviewer noted that the album was "defiled by intentionally lo-fi production standards that still barely try to mask the sophisticated compositional foundations supporting excellent songs" and named "Glemselens elv" as a highlight. Metal Storm called Belus a "disappointment". While they praised the instrumentation, they heavily criticized Vikernes' change of vocal style when compared to earlier albums; "His wolf-esque howls have been replaced with mediocre, wholly unimpressive run-off-the-mill shrieks". They gave the album 6.9 out of 10.

== Track listing ==
All tracks are written by Burzum

No.	Title	Translation (by Varg Vikernes)	Length
1.	"Leukes renkespill (Introduksjon)"	Leuke's Plot (Introduction)	0:33
2.	"Belus' doed"	Belus' Death	6:23
3.	"Glemselens elv"	River of Forgetfulness	11:54
4.	"Kaimadalthas nedstigning"	Kaimadalthas' Descent	6:43
5.	"Sverddans"	Sword Dance	2:27
6.	"Keliohesten"	The Kelio Horse	5:45
7.	"Morgenroede"	Dawn	8:54
8.	"Belus' tilbakekomst (Konklusjon)"	Belus' Return (Conclusion)	9:37
Total length:			52:16

== Credits ==
- Varg Vikernes – vocals, guitar, keyboard, bass, drums, mixing, production
- Davide Bertolini – mixing
- Tim Turan – mastering
- Pytten – production

== Charts ==
Chart (2010)	Peak position
Finnish Albums Chart	8
Norwegian Albums Chart	23
