= Hades Almighty =

Norwegian band

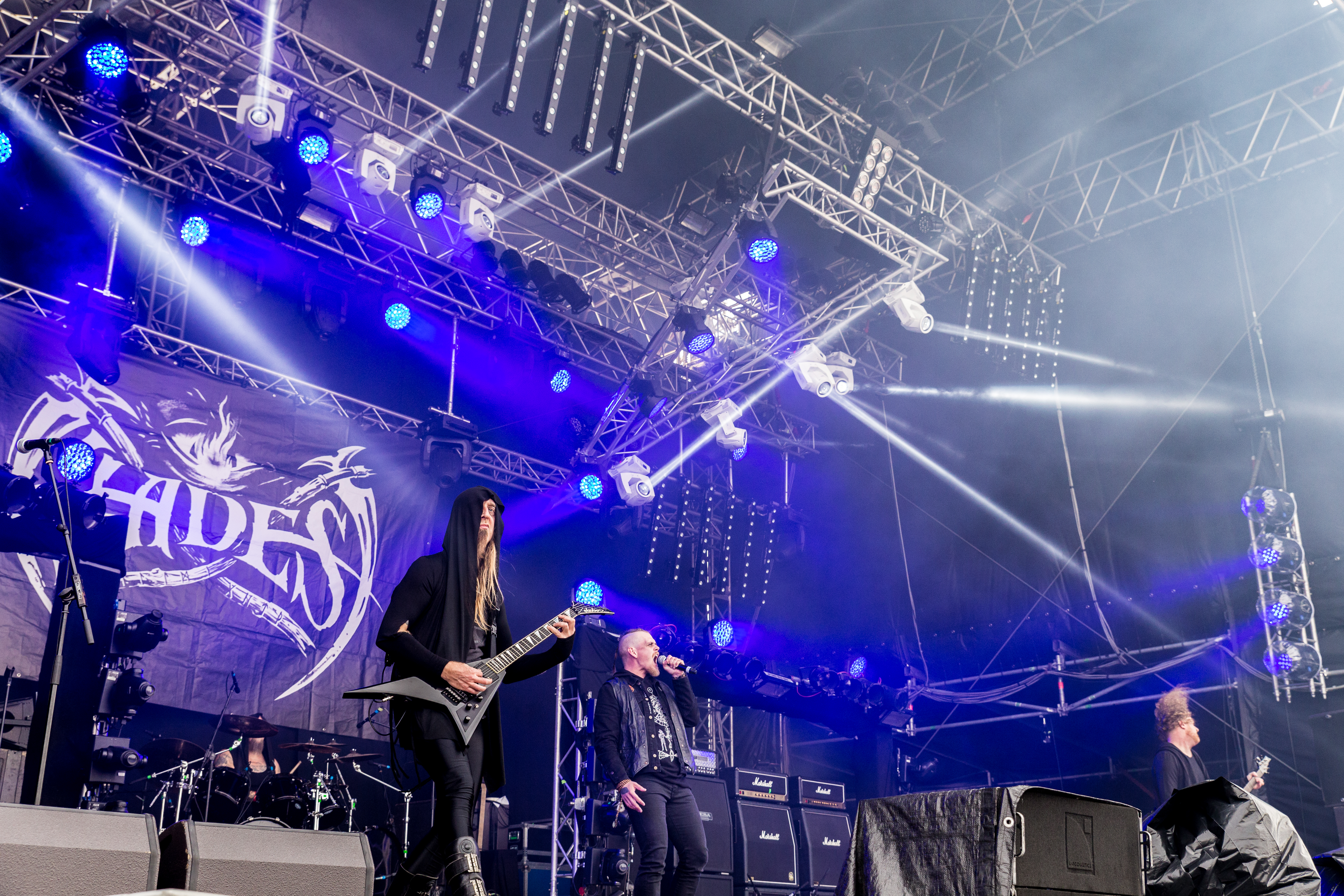
- Hades Almighty at Party.San Metal Open Air 2017

Background information
- Also known as: Hades (1992–1998)
- Origin: Bergen, Norway
- Genres: Black metal, Viking metal
- Years active: 1992–present
- Labels: Dark Essence, Full Moon Productions, Hammerheart, Mystic Production, Nuclear Blast, Psycho Bitch, Wounded Love
- Members: Jørn Inge Tunsberg; Remi Andersen; Ask Ty Arctander; Therese Tofting
- Past members: Jan Otto Garmanslund; Wilhelm Nagel; Stig Hagenes

Hades Almighty is a Norwegian black metal band from Bergen, formed in 1992 as Hades. The band changed their name to Hades Almighty in 1998, following complaints from an American band with a prior claim to the name. Hades Almighty has released four studio albums.

== History ==
Ex-Immortal guitarist Jørn Inge Tunsberg and ex-Dark drummer Remi Andersen formed Hades in Bergen, Norway, in 1992. Vocalist and bassist Jan Otto "Janto" Garmannslund and second guitarist Wilhelm Nagel joined them later. Hades recorded their first demo, Alone Walkyng, in June 1993 at Grieghallen, produced by Pytten. In 1993, Tunsberg and Varg Vikernes of Burzum were convicted and sentenced to prison for burning a church in Åsane. Following Alone Walkyng, the band signed with Full Moon Productions and recorded their first album, ...Again Shall Be, in 1994 at Grieghallen. Guitarist Nagel left the band that year and Stig Hagenes replaced him.

Hades released Dawn of the Dying Sun in 1997, recorded at Grieghallen. The band supported the release with extensive touring throughout Europe and America. In 1998, the band changed their name to Hades Almighty due to complaints from an American band with a prior claim to the name. Following the name-change, the band worked on their next album and as played at Wacken Open Air.

In 1999, the band released Millenium Nocturne, recorded in Prolog Studios in Dortmund. Hades Almighty toured Europe to support the album with Immortal and Benediction, and a separate set of shows in the Benelux region with Mayhem and Primordial. Hades Almighty released Pulse of Decay in 2001. The band signed with management company Khaoz Productions in 2003, and with Dark Essence Records in 2004. The label re-released Pulse of Decay in 2004 with bonus tracks produced by Pytten, including a cover of Manowar's "Each Dawn I Die", and a music video for "Submission Equals Suicide".

In 2014, frontman Janto left Hades Almighty after 22 years for personal reasons, and was replaced with Ask Ty Arctander (of Kampfar). The new line-up released the EP Pyre Era, Black! in 2015. In 2018, bassist Therese Tofting of Fairy joined the band.

== Members ==
=== Current line-up ===
- Ask Ty Arctander - lead vocals (2014–present)
- Jørn Inge Tunsberg - lead guitar, keyboards (1992–present)
- Therese Tofting - bass guitar, backing vocals (2018–present)
- Remi Andersen - drums (1992–present)

=== Past members ===
- Jan Otto "Janto" Garmannslund - lead vocals, bass guitar, keyboards (1992–2014)
- Wilhelm Nagel - guitar (1993–1994)
- Stig Hagenes - guitar (1994–1999)

== Discography ==
=== As Hades ===
Studio albums

- ...Again Shall Be (1994)
- Dawn of the Dying Sun (1997)

Demos

- Alone Walkyng (1993)

=== As Hades Almighty ===
Studio albums

- Millennium Nocturne (1999)
- The Pulse of Decay (2001)

EPs

- Pyre Era, Black! (EP, 2015)
