= Umskiptar =

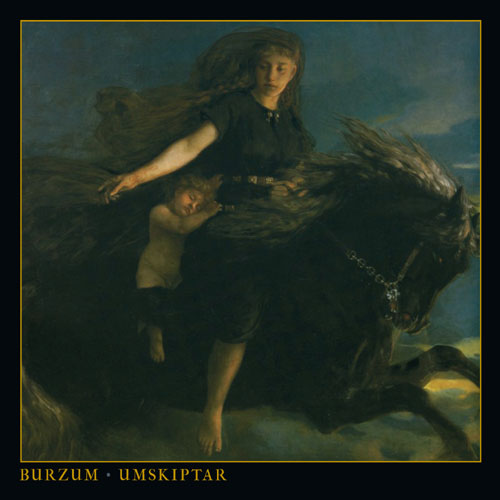

Studio album by Burzum
- Released: 21 May 2012
- Recorded: September 2011 at Grieg Hall in Bergen, Norway
- Genres: Black metal; viking metal
- Length: 66:16
- Label: Byelobog Productions
- Producers: Varg Vikernes; Pytten; Davide Bertolini

Burzum chronology
| From the Depths of Darkness (2011) | Umskiptar (2012) | Sôl austan, Mâni vestan (2013) |

Umskiptar (Old Norse for Metamorphosis) is the ninth studio album by the Norwegian one-man band Burzum, released on 21 May 2012 through Byelobog Productions. It has been described by Varg Vikernes as a "return to the roots", with a priority on atmosphere. The album's lyrics are taken from an Old Norse poem entitled Völuspá. The album was leaked two months before its release date, due, according to Vikernes, a former PR agent of his having "sent promotional copies of the entire album to left wing extremist magazines" without his knowledge or consent.

The cover art is taken from the painting Nótt by Norwegian painter Peter Nicolai Arbo. It was Vikernes' final heavy metal album until 2024's The Land of Thule.

== Music ==
Despite featuring "a stripped-down" viking metal sound that "pays homage" to the likes of Bathory and early Enslaved, Umskiptar retains "the fuzzy riffing and low production values" of Burzum's previous black metal releases. SputnikMusic's Kyle Ward described the album's style as "an odd bastardization of the usual black metal sound". The album also rarely features harsh vocals.

The track "Alfadanz" features a "submerged" piano intro and repeating simple riffs. "Gullaldr" is a ten-minute-long spoken word track, overlaid with guitar plucking. "Níðhöggr" finds Vikernes whispering over field recordings, a bass drum and a "distant, wobbly tone". The vocals are buried "between sheets of black-metal guitar screech" on the track "Heiðr", while "Valgaldr" is described as "an eight-minute bog in which he wraps ghoulish harmonies around distorted riffs", with a sound compared to "Iron Maiden on Thorazine".

== Critical reception ==
Professional ratings
Review scores
| Source | Rating |
|---|---|
| Metal Storm | 3.0/10 |
| Pitchfork | 3.3/10 |

The album generally received negative reviews from music critics. Metal Storm's staff critic Troy Killjoy wrote: "Rather than beautifully composed epic melodious black metal anthems, encouraging atmospheric tales of fantasy and historical wars, or even the traditional grim and frostbitten stylings of the second wave (of which Burzum was a significant part), Varg presents the world with his least imaginative work to date – even taking Dauði Baldrs into consideration".

== Track listing ==
| No. | Title | Translation (by Varg Vikernes) | Length |
|---|---|---|---|
| 1. | "Blóðstokkinn" | Soaked in Blood | 1:10 |
| 2. | "Jóln" | Deities | 5:46 |
| 3. | "Alfadanz" | Elven Dance | 9:34 |
| 4. | "Hit helga Tré" | The Sacred Tree | 6:47 |
| 5. | "Æra" | Honour | 3:54 |
| 6. | "Heiðr" | Esteem | 2:57 |
| 7. | "Valgaldr" | Song of the Fallen | 7:57 |
| 8. | "Galgviðr" | Gallow Forest | 7:12 |
| 9. | "Surtr Sunnan" | Black from the South | 4:11 |
| 10. | "Gullaldr" | Golden Age | 10:14 |
| 11. | "Níðhöggr" | Attack from Below | 4:59 |
| Total length: | | | 66:16 |

== Personnel ==
Album personnel as adapted from official Burzum website.

- Varg Vikernes – vocals, all instruments, production, design, layout
- Pytten – production, mixing
- Davide Bertolini – production
- Naweed – mastering
- Dan Capp – design, layout
