= Det som engang var =

Studio album by Burzum
- Released: August 1993
- Recorded: April 1992
- Studio: Grieg Hall, Bergen, Norway
- Genre: Black metal; dark ambient
- Length: 39:49
- Language: English, Norwegian
- Label: Cymophane
- Producer: Count Grishnackh, Pytten

Burzum chronology
Aske (1993)	Det som engang var (1993)	Hvis lyset tar oss (1994)

Det som engang var (Norwegian for What Once Was) is the second studio album by the Norwegian black metal solo project Burzum. It was recorded in April 1992 and released in August 1993 through Burzum's own label, Cymophane Productions.

== Background ==
Varg Vikernes recorded the first four Burzum albums between January 1992 and March 1993 at the Grieg Hall in Bergen. However, the releases were spread out, with many months between the recording and the release of each album.

The album was initially named På svarte troner (Norwegian for "On Black Thrones") but was renamed shortly before its release. The song "Det som en gang var" (with a slightly different spelling) would appear on the next album, Hvis lyset tar oss.

The album cover is visually inspired by the Advanced Dungeons & Dragons (1st edition) module The Temple of Elemental Evil. At the bottom of the artwork is a depiction of the "reaper" and the tree shown on Burzum's first album. The album cover was drawn by Jannicke Wiese-Hansen, who also drew the cover for the first Burzum album.

== Release ==
Det som engang var was released on CD in August 1993 through Vikernes' own record label, Cymophane Productions, which he created so he could leave Deathlike Silence Productions, which was owned by Mayhem guitarist Euronymous. Its release was limited to around 950 copies. Although the two were friends, by the time of the album's release they had fallen out. On 10 August 1993, Vikernes stabbed Euronymous to death outside his apartment in Oslo. He was arrested a few days later and, in May 1994, was sentenced to 21 years in prison for both the murder and the church arsons.

Det som engang var was reissued in 1994, by Misanthropy Records, in two formats: CD and vinyl. The vinyl release contained a Limited Edition poster of the album cover art.

After Vikernes's release from prison in 2009, he re-recorded two songs from the album—"Key to the Gate" and "Snu mikrokosmos tegn"—and released them on the album From the Depths of Darkness.

== Critical reception ==
Professional ratings
Review scores
Source	Rating
AllMusic	4/5 stars
Collector's Guide to Heavy Metal	6/10
Sputnikmusic	5/5 stars

Eduardo Rivadavia of Allmusic wrote: "Vikernes' claim to musical genius would soon be irreparably stained by his, shall we say, extra-curricular infamy, burying all of the fascinating contradictions inherent in his art under the brutally one-dimensional label of 'murderer', and, by extension, forcing complicated feelings of guilt upon all those who would dare experience this otherwise compelling music."

== Track listing ==
All tracks are written by Count Grishnackh.

No.	Title	Length
1.	"Den onde kysten" ("The Evil Coast")	2:20
2.	"Key to the Gate"	5:10
3.	"En ring til aa herske" ("One Ring to Rule")	7:09
4.	"Lost Wisdom"	4:38
5.	"Han som reiste" ("He Who Travelled")	4:50
6.	"Naar himmelen klarner" ("When the Sky Clears")	3:50
7.	"Snu mikrokosmos tegn" ("Turn the Sign of the Microcosm")	9:36
8.	"Svarte troner" ("Black Thrones")	2:16
Total length:		39:49

== Personnel ==
Burzum

- Count Grishnackh – vocals, guitar, keyboard, drums, bass, gong, production

Additional personnel

- Euronymous – gong (track 1)
- Pytten – production
- Jannicke Wiise-Hansen – album artwork (artwork is a partial re-creation of The Temple of Elemental Evil's cover art)
