= Eirik Hundvin =

Norwegian producer, musician and recording engineer

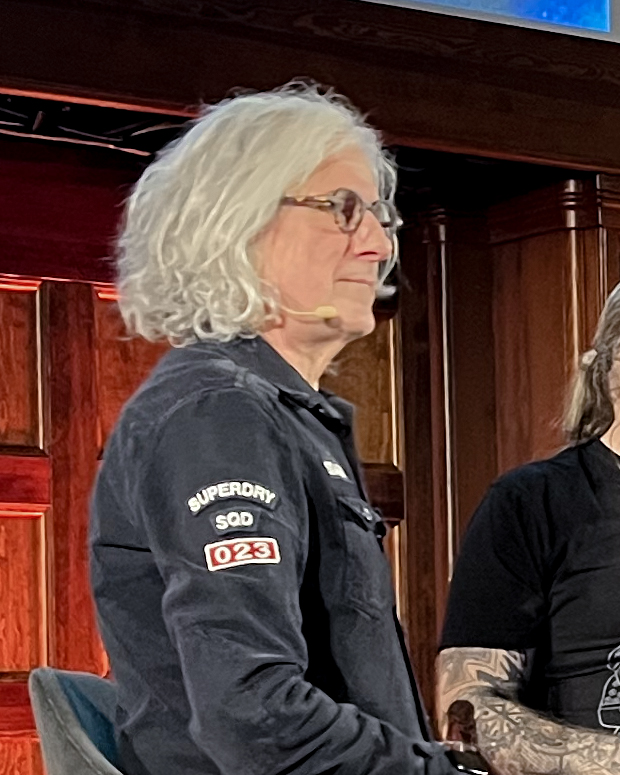
- Hundvin in 2023

Background information
- Also known as: Pytten
- Born: 8 February 1950 (age 76); Bergen, Norway
- Genres: Black metal; extreme metal; rock; pop
- Occupations: Record producer; musician; composer; engineer
- Instrument: Bass
- Years active: 1976–present
- Formerly of: Tornerose; Blind Date

Eirik Hundvin (born 8 February 1950), also known as Pytten, is a Norwegian producer, musician and recording engineer. He is widely known for producing and collaborating with influential acts in the Norwegian black metal scene, including Mayhem, Burzum, Immortal, Emperor, Satyricon, Enslaved, Gorgoroth, Borknagar and Taake. Hundvin worked out of Grieghallen Lydstudio at the Grieg Hall in Bergen from 1989 to 2013, when it was closed. He has been a member of Tornerose and Blind Date as a bassist. Hundvin is the father of handball player and media personality Mia Hundvin.

== Selected discography ==
Year	Artist	Title	Song(s)	Notes
1991	Immortal	Immortal		
1992	Burzum	Burzum		
1992	Immortal	Diabolical Fullmoon Mysticism		
1993	Burzum	Aske		
1993	Burzum	Det Som Engang Var		
1993	Immortal	Pure Holocaust		
1994	Emperor	In The Nightside Eclipse		
1994	Enslaved	Vikingligr Veldi		
1994	Burzum	Hvis Lyset Tar Oss		
1994	Mayhem	De Mysteriis Dom Sathanas		
1994	Enslaved	Frost		
1994	Gorgoroth	Pentagram		
1994	Hades	...Again Shall Be		
1995	Helheim	Jormundgand		
1995	Demonic	Lead Us Into Darkness		
1995	Immortal	Battles In The North		
1996	Burzum	Filosofem		
1996	Gorgoroth	Antichrist		
1996	Borknagar	Borknagar		
1996	Einherjer	Dragons Of The North		
1997	Emperor	Reverence		
1997	Emperor	Anthems to the Welkin at Dusk		
1997	Einherjer	Far Far North		
1997	Obtained Enslavement	Witchcraft		
1997	Enslaved	Eld		
1997	Burzum	Dauði Baldrs		
1997	Gorgoroth	Under The Sign Of Hell		
1997	Hades	The Dawn Of The Dying Sun		
1997	Helheim	Av Norrøn Ætt		
1997	Aeternus	Beyond The Wandering Moon		
1998	Gorgoroth	Destroyer		
1998	Demonic	The Empire Of Agony		
1998	Desekrator	Metal For Demons		
1998	Aeternus	...And So The Night Became		
1998	Obtained Enslavement	Soulblight		
1999	Burzum	Hliðskjálf		
1999	Taake	Nattestid ser porten vid		
1999	Aeternus	Shadows Of Old		
1999	Trelldom	Til et Annet...		
1999	Windir	Arntor		
1999	Old Funeral	The Older Ones		
2000	Gaahlskagg	Erotic Funeral		
2000	Aeternus	Burning The Shroud		
2001	Mörk Gryning	Maelstrom Chaos		
2001	Hades Almighty	The Pulse Of Decay		
2001	Enslaved	Monumension		
2001	Aeternus	Ascension Of Terror		
2002	Taake	Over Bjoergvin graater himmerik		
2003	Dark Fortress	Profane Genocidal Creations		
2003	Aeternus	A Darker Monument		
2003	Enslaved	Below The Lights		
2003	Helheim	Yersinia Pestis		
2004	Enslaved	Isa		
2005	Taake	Hordalands doedskvad		
2005	Malsain	They Never Die		
2005	Octavia Sperati	Winter Enclosure		
2006	Satyricon	Now, Diabolical		
2006	Aeternus	HeXaeon		
2006	Helheim	The Journeys and the Experiences of Death		
2007	Trelldom	Til Minne...		
2008	Gorgoroth	True Norwegian Black Metal – Live In Grieghallen		
2009	Immortal	All Shall Fall		
2010	Burzum	Belus		
2011	Burzum	Fallen		
2011	Burzum	From the Depths of Darkness		
2012	Burzum	Umskiptar		
2016	Djevel	Norske Ritualer	"Doedskraft og tri nagler"	Recorded the vocals of Hoest
2017	Arvas	Nocturno Inferno		
2020	Amputation	Slaughtered In The Arms Of God		
