= From the Depths of Darkness =

Compilation album by Burzum
- Released: 6 December 2011
- Recorded: March 2010 at the Grieg Hall in Bergen
- Genre: Black metal; dark ambient
- Length: 62:28
- Label: Byelobog Productions
- Producer: Davide Bertolini

Burzum chronology
Fallen (2011)	From the Depths of Darkness (2011)	Umskiptar (2012)

From the Depths of Darkness is a compilation album by one-man musical project Burzum, released on 6 December 2011 through Byelobog Productions. It consists of newly re-recorded tracks from Burzum's first two albums, Burzum (1992) and Det som engang var (1993), along with three new tracks.

== Track listing ==
All tracks are written by Burzum

No.	Title	Original album	Length
1.	"The Coming (Introduction)"	(new track)	0:25
2.	"Feeble Screams from Forests Unknown"	Burzum	7:48
3.	"Sassu Wunnu (Introduction)"	(new track)	0:44
4.	"Ea, Lord of the Depths"	Burzum	5:23
5.	"Spell of Destruction"	Burzum	6:47
6.	"A Lost Forgotten Sad Spirit"	Burzum	11:30
7.	"My Journey to the Stars"	Burzum	7:51
8.	"Call of the Siren (Introduction)"	(new track)	2:00
9.	"Key to the Gate"	Det som engang var	5:14
10.	"Turn the Sign of the Microcosm (Snu Mikrokosmos' Tegn)"	Det som engang var	9:50
11.	"Channeling the Power of Minds into a New God"	Burzum	4:56
Total length:			62:28

== Personnel ==
- Varg Vikernes – vocals, guitar, synthesizer, drums, bass
- Pytten – engineering
- Davide Bertolini – engineering, production
- Naweed Ahmed – mastering
- Dan Capp – cover art
