= The Pulse of Decay =

Studio album by Hades Almighty
- Released: 2001
- Recorded: March 2000
- Studios: Sound Suite Studio; Grieghallen
- Genre: Experimental black metal
- Length: 33:04
- Labels: Psycho Bitch Records; Dark Essence Records (2004 reissue)
- Producers: Hades Almighty; Terje Refsnes; Pytten

Hades Almighty chronology
Millenium Nocturne (1999)	The Pulse of Decay (2001)

Reissue cover

The Pulse of Decay is the fourth studio album by Norwegian black metal band Hades Almighty. It was released in 2001 through Psycho Bitch Records and is the last to feature long-time vocalist and bassist Jan Otto "Janto" Garmanslund. The album was recorded at Sound Suite Studio in Norway in March 2000 and produced by the band and Terje Refsnes. It was re-released on Dark Essence Records in 2004 with additional bonus tracks recorded live at Grieghallen in June 2004 and produced by Pytten.

== Track listing ==
All tracks are written by Hades Almighty, except where noted.

No.	Title	Length
1.	"216/Cataclysmic"	1:26
2.	"Submission Equals Suicide"	4:26
3.	"The Pulse of Decay"	5:35
4.	"Antichrist Inside"	4:21
5.	"Vendetta Assassination"	4:09
6.	"Apocalypse"	6:42
7.	"Razor"	6:25
Total length:		33:04

Reissue bonus tracks
No.	Title	Length
8.	"Generation Murder-Rape"	3:27
9.	"Cyber Alchemist"	2:37
10.	"Each Dawn I Die" (Manowar cover)	4:23
Total length:		43:31

== Personnel ==
- Jan Otto "Janto" Garmanslund – vocals, bass, keyboards, producer, engineer
- Jørn Inge Tunsberg – guitars, keyboards, producer,
- Remi Andersen – drums, backing vocals, producer, engineer
- Terje Refsnes – producer, engineer (tracks 1–7)
- Pytten – producer, engineer (tracks 8–10)
