= Hliðskjálf (album) =

Studio album by Burzum
- Released: 12 April 1999
- Recorded: Summer 1998 Tønsberg, Norway
- Genre: Dark ambient; ambient; neofolk; dungeon synth
- Length: 33:42
- Label: Misanthropy
- Producer: Varg Vikernes

Burzum chronology
Dauði Baldrs (1997)	Hliðskjálf (1999)	Belus (2010)

Professional ratings
Review scores
Source	Rating
Allmusic	3/5 stars

Hliðskjálf (named after the throne of the Norse god Odin) is the sixth studio album by Norwegian solo artist Burzum. This album was the second to be recorded by Varg Vikernes while he was imprisoned for murder and arson and also Burzum's second ambient album. Dauði Baldrs and Hliðskjálf were created with synthesized instruments as he was not allowed any other instruments while being imprisoned. For this album, Vikernes was allowed to have the keyboard and recording device for only one week. The first pressing of its vinyl format release was pressed on a shiny burnished color reminiscent of gold.

== Track listing ==
All music is composed by Varg Vikernes.

No.	Title	Length
1.	"Tuistos Herz" ("Tuisto's Heart")	6:13
2.	"Der Tod Wuotans" ("The Death of Wotan")	6:43
3.	"Ansuzgardaraiwô" ("Warriors of Ansuzgarda")	4:28
4.	"Die Liebe Nerþus'" ("The Love of Nerthus")	2:14
5.	"Frijôs einsames Trauern" ("Frijo's Lonely Mourning")	6:15
6.	"Einfühlungsvermögen" ("The Power of Empathy")	3:55
7.	"Frijôs goldene Tränen" ("Frijo's Golden Tears")	2:38
8.	"Der weinende Hadnur" ("The Weeping Hadnur")	1:16
Total length:		33:42

== Credits ==
- Varg Vikernes – synthesizers, audio engineering, songwriting
- Pytten – mastering

== Artwork ==
- Tania Stene – cover art
- Stephen O'Malley – design/additional art

The additional art in the booklet is taken mainly from silent films. For example, the image for "Frijôs goldene Tränen" is taken from F.W. Murnau's Faust.
