= Aske (EP) =

EP by Burzum
- Released: March 1993
- Recorded: September 1992
- Studio: Grieg Hall, Bergen, Norway
- Genre: Black metal
- Length: 20:02
- Language: Norwegian, English
- Label: Deathlike Silence
- Producer: Count Grishnackh, Pytten

Burzum chronology
Burzum (1992)	Aske (1993)	Det som engang var (1993)

Professional ratings
Review scores
Source	Rating
AllMusic	(Burzum / Aske version)

Aske (Norwegian for Ashes) is an EP by Norwegian black metal solo project Burzum. Though recorded in April and August 1992, after Det som engang var, it was released before that album in March 1993, through Deathlike Silence Productions.

== Background ==
The cover is a photograph of the Fantoft Stave Church after its arson on 6 June 1992. Varg Vikernes was strongly suspected of burning the church, and the photograph is widely believed to have been taken by Vikernes himself.

According to the official Burzum website, the cover photograph was taken by Are Mundal. In an interview, Mundal stated that Vikernes, a longtime friend, asked him to visit the site of the church shortly after the fire and take photographs, of which one became the album cover. Mundal was initially regarded as a suspect in the arson, but was cleared of all charges. Vikernes allegedly had the photos developed in Sweden in order to fend off suspicion.

Bass guitar on two of the tracks is performed by Samoth of the band Emperor.

A tape version featuring the old title of the release Inn I Drømmens Slott (Norwegian for "Into the Castle of Dreams") were made by Varg and spread by him and Samoth, the album was initially intended to be released on Varg's personal label called "Burz-Nazg Prod" (later Cymophane) before the Deathlike Silence Prod. pressing.

== Release ==
The first 1000 copies of Aske were packaged with a lighter bearing the album cover's image of Fantoft Stave Church's remains.

Aske was later re-released as Burzum / Aske alongside the songs from Burzum's debut album.

== Track listing ==
All tracks are written by Count Grishnackh

No.	Title	Length
1.	"Stemmen fra tårnet" ("The Voice from the Tower")	6:09
2.	"Dominus Sathanas" ("Master Satan")	3:02
3.	"A Lost Forgotten Sad Spirit"	10:51
Total length:		20:02

== Personnel ==
- Count Grishnackh – vocals, guitar, drums, bass (track 2), production
- Samoth – bass (tracks 1, 3)
- Pytten – production
