= Helheim (band) =

Norwegian black metal band

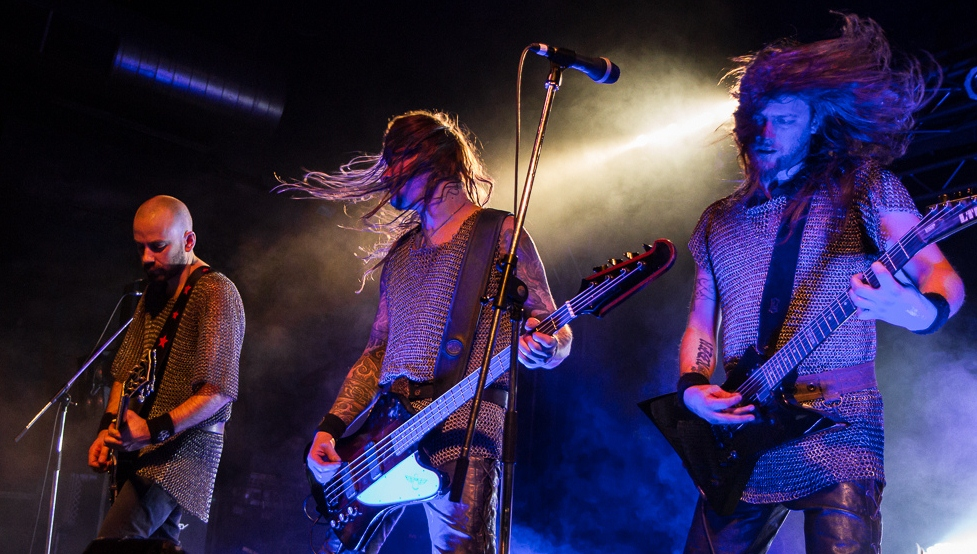
- Helheim performing in 2013

Background information
- Origin: Bergen, Norway
- Genres: Black metal, Viking metal
- Years active: 1992–present
- Labels: Solistitium, Ars Metalli, Massacre, Dark Essence
- Members: Hrymr; V'gandr; H'grimnir; Reichborn

Helheim is a Norwegian black metal band from Bergen, formed in 1992.

== History ==
Helheim was founded in 1992 by V'gandr (bass, vocals) and H'grimnir (guitar, vocals), who added drummer Hrymr. The band performed in local Bergen festivals, and, in 1993, released their debut demo, Helheim, distributed only in Norway.

Soon after the demo, the band worked on new material as a three-piece, after Nidhogg's brief stint in the band. In mid-1994, the band released second demo Nidr ok Nordr liggr Helvegr ("Netherwards and Northwards lies Helheim"). Solistitium (now Millennium Music) signed the band and released Jormundgand (named after the World Serpent, Jörmungandr), recorded in Grieghallen in 1995. In 1996, Helheim toured Europe.

After the tour, the band recorded Av Norrøn Ætt ("Of Norse Lineage"). The release of the second album fulfilled the band's contract with Solistitium Records. The band was without a label for two years. In 1999, Ars Metalli offered to sign them to a one-album contract. The band was apprehensive that an underground label would promote them adequately, but were eager to work on new material. After signing to the label, Lindheim on synthesizer and Thorbjørn on lead guitars joined them.

The band recorded the MCD Terrorveldet ("The Realm of Terror") with producer Odd Kronheim of the S.J.E.F Studio, and then another album, Blod & Ild ("Blood & Fire"). Both received acclaim from the Norwegian and international metal press, and the metal scene. The CD included their first music video, for the song "Jernskogen" ("The Ironforest"), from the Blod & Ild release. In 2001, the band attempted to publish another MCD, Helsviti ("Hell's Punishment"), but difficulties with Ars Metalli postponed this release indefinitely.

Despite these troubles, the band recorded Yersinia Pestis. Massacre Records released and distributed the album, which was well received by critics and fans. Due to a lack of promotion, the album did not reach many fans outside Norway. Massacre Records had agreed to publish the previously recorded MCD Helsviti, but this never came about.

In 2005, Lindheim left the band. In June 2006, the band released The Journeys and Experiences of Death, a concept album focusing on Viking beliefs concerning death. The first 2,000 copies were published through Dark Essence Records as a double digipack, which included Helsviti.

== Discography ==
=== Studio albums ===
- Jormundgand (CD/LP, 1995)
- Av Norrøn Ætt (CD, 1997)
- Blod og Ild (CD, 2000)
- Yersinia Pestis (CD, 2003)
- The Journeys and the Experiences of Death (CD, 2006)
- Kaoskult (CD, 2008)
- Heiðindómr ok mótgangr (CD, 2011)
- raunijaR (CD, 2015)
- landawarijaR (CD, 2017)
- Rignir (CD, 2019)
- WoduridaR (CD, 2021)
- HrabnaR / Ad vesa (CD, 2025)

=== EPs ===
- Terrorveldet (MCD, 1999)
- Åsgards Fall (MCD, 2010)

== Lineup ==
=== Current members ===
- Hrymr – drums and programming (1992-present)
- V'gandr – bass and vocals (1992-present)
- H'grimnir – rhythm guitar and vocals (1992-present)
- Noralf – lead guitar (2008-present)

=== Former members ===
- Lindheim – keyboards, synthesizers (1999–2005)
- Thorbjørn – lead guitar (1999–2008)
