= Jormundgand =

Studio album by Helheim
- Released: 1995
- Recorded: Grieghallen Studio
- Genres: Black metal, viking metal
- Length: 49:20
- Label: Solistitium Records
- Producer: Pytten

Helheim chronology
Jormundgand (1995)	Av Norrøn Ætt (1997)

Jormundgand is Helheim's debut full-length album, released in 1995. The limited LP version has alternative artwork. The CD version has a bonus track "Galder". Female vocals are performed by Mailin.

== Track listing ==
- All Lyrics By Vanargandr. All Music As Noted.
1. "Jormundgand" – 7:48 (Hrimgrimnir)
2. "Vigrids Vård " – 8:16 (Vanargandr)
3. "Nidr ok Nordr liggr Helvegr" – 4:28 (Vanargandr)
4. "Gravlagt I Eljudne" – 8:47 (Hrimgrimnir)
5. "Svart Visdom" – 9:08 (Hrimgrimnir)
6. "Jotnevandring" – 2:27 (Hrymr)
7. "Nattravnens Tokt" – 5:10 (Vanargandr)
8. "Galder" – 3:16

== Personnel ==
=== Helheim ===
- Hrimgrimnir: guitars, vocal
- Vanargandr: bass, vocals
- Hrmyr: drums, percussion, keyboards, synthesizers, programming

=== Additional musicians ===
- Knut Futhark: Jew's harp
- Thomas Krokeide: trumpet
- Mailin: female vocals
