= Jørn Inge Tunsberg =

Norwegian musician (born 1970)

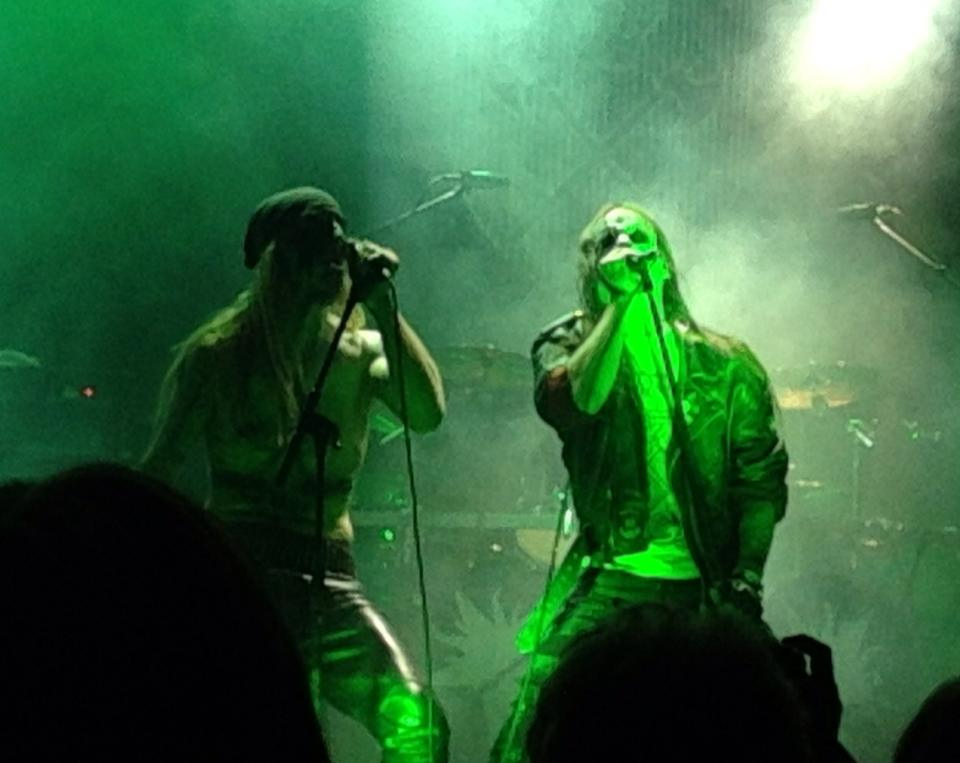

Background information
- Born: 4 December 1970 (age 55); Bergen, Norway
- Genres: Death metal, black metal
- Occupation: Musician
- Instruments: Guitar; bass; drums; keyboards
- Years active: 1989–present
- Member of: Hades Almighty; Vathr
- Formerly of: Dominanz; Immortal; Old Funeral; Amputation

Jørn Inge Tunsberg (born 4 December 1970) is a Norwegian death/black metal musician. He is best known as the founder and guitarist of Bergen-based band Hades Almighty, and a former member of Immortal, Dominanz, Old Funeral and Amputation. He formed his solo project Vathr in 2022.

== Career ==
Tunsberg started his musical career in the late 1980s as a member of metal bands Old Funeral and Amputation. He joined the first lineup of Immortal in 1991, but left after the recording of their self-titled demo later that year. Following his departure from Immortal, Tunsberg formed his own band, Hades, in 1992, which changed its name to Hades Almighty in 1998. Tunsberg was convicted for the arson of the Old Åsane Church on Christmas Eve 1992 along with Varg Vikernes and spent two years in prison. He was featured in the documentaries Satan Rides the Media in 1999 and Metal: A Headbanger's Journey in 2005. Tunsberg stated in the documentaries and in an interview with Bergensavisen that he does not regret his role in the arson. In Satan Rides the Media, Tunsberg explains that the action was a response to Christian morals and that "Norway should not be Christian", the point being "very symbolic." In an interview with Sam Dunn for Metal: A Headbanger's Journey, Tunsberg stated that: "The most important thing that happened was that the church were burnt up. So that's something I stand for, and I stood for it then, I will stand for it now and I will stand for it until I die. […] It's kind of a statement, to break down Christianity." Tunsberg was a member of metal band Dominanz from 2008 to 2015. He formed the solo project Vathr in 2022 and released the EP Dead & United later that year.

== Discography ==
=== With Hades Almighty ===
Studio albums

- ...Again Shall Be (1994)
- Dawn of the Dying Sun (1997)
- Millennium Nocturne (1999)
- The Pulse of Decay (2001)
- Studio EPs
  - Pyre Era, Black! (EP, 2015)
