= Hvis lyset tar oss =

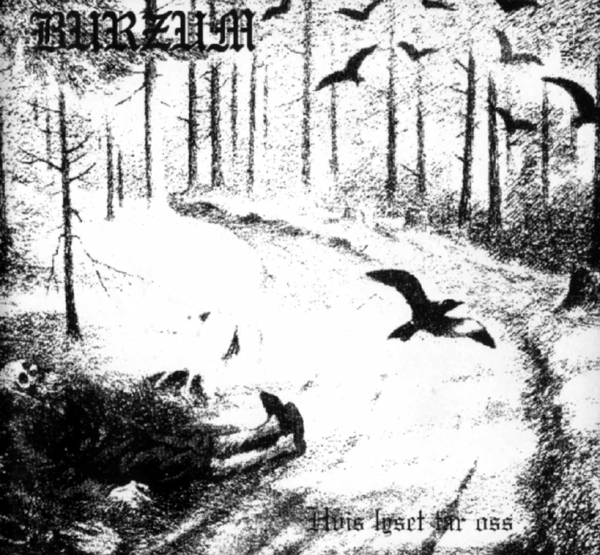
- Cover art by Theodor Kittelsen

Studio album by Burzum
- Released: April 1994
- Recorded: September 1992
- Studio: Grieg Hall in Bergen
- Genres: Black metal; dark ambient
- Length: 44:27
- Language: Norwegian
- Labels: Misanthropy, Cymophane
- Producers: Count Grishnackh, Pytten

Burzum chronology
Det som engang var (1993)	Hvis lyset tar oss (1994)	Filosofem (1996)

Professional ratings
Review scores
Source	Rating
AllMusic	4.5/5 stars

Hvis lyset tar oss (Norwegian for If the Light Takes Us) is the third studio album by Norwegian black metal solo project Burzum. It was recorded in September 1992, but not released until April 1994, through Misanthropy Records and Varg Vikernes' own record label, Cymophane Productions.

== Background ==
Varg Vikernes recorded the first four Burzum albums between January 1992 and March 1993 at the Grieg Hall in Bergen. However, the releases were spread out, with many months between the recording and the release of each album.

The album cover features an 1894–1895 drawing by Norwegian artist Theodor Kittelsen named Fattigmannen ("The Pauper"). Vikernes dedicated the album to Fenriz of fellow Norwegian black metal band Darkthrone and Demonaz from Norwegian black metal band Immortal; however, in an interview in 2010, he expressed regret for the dedication to Demonaz and claimed Demonaz was "a rat like no other". Promotional copies sent to fanzines included the song "Et hvitt lys over skogen" (Norwegian for "A White Light Over the Forest") instead of "Tomhet". "Et hvitt lys over skogen" later appeared on the 1998 compilation album Presumed Guilty.

According to Vikernes, Hvis lyset tar oss is a concept album, about:

[...] what once was, before the light took us and we rode into the castle of the dream. Into emptiness. It's something like: beware the Christian light, it will take you away into degeneracy and nothingness. What others call light I call darkness. Seek the darkness and hell and you will find nothing but evolution.

== Reception ==
Kelefa Sanneh wrote, "it starts with three long and smudgy midtempo songs, with rudimentary guitar-playing and vocals that sound like screams from down the hall; the mood is grim but also rather wistful, especially during the fourth and final track, an atmospheric keyboard piece that last fourteen minutes."

In 2013, Decibel ranked Hvis lyset tar oss at number 37 on its list of the Top 100 Black Metal Albums of All Time.

== Track listing ==
All tracks are written by Varg Vikernes.

No.	Title	Length
1.	"Det som en gang var" ("What Once Was")	14:21
2.	"Hvis lyset tar oss" ("If the Light Takes Us")	8:04
3.	"Inn i slottet fra droemmen" ("Into the Castle from the Dream")	7:51
4.	"Tomhet" ("Emptiness")	14:11
Total length:		44:27

== Personnel ==
- Count Grishnackh (Varg Vikernes) – vocals, guitar, keyboard, synthesizer, drums, bass, production
- Pytten – production
