= Filosofem =

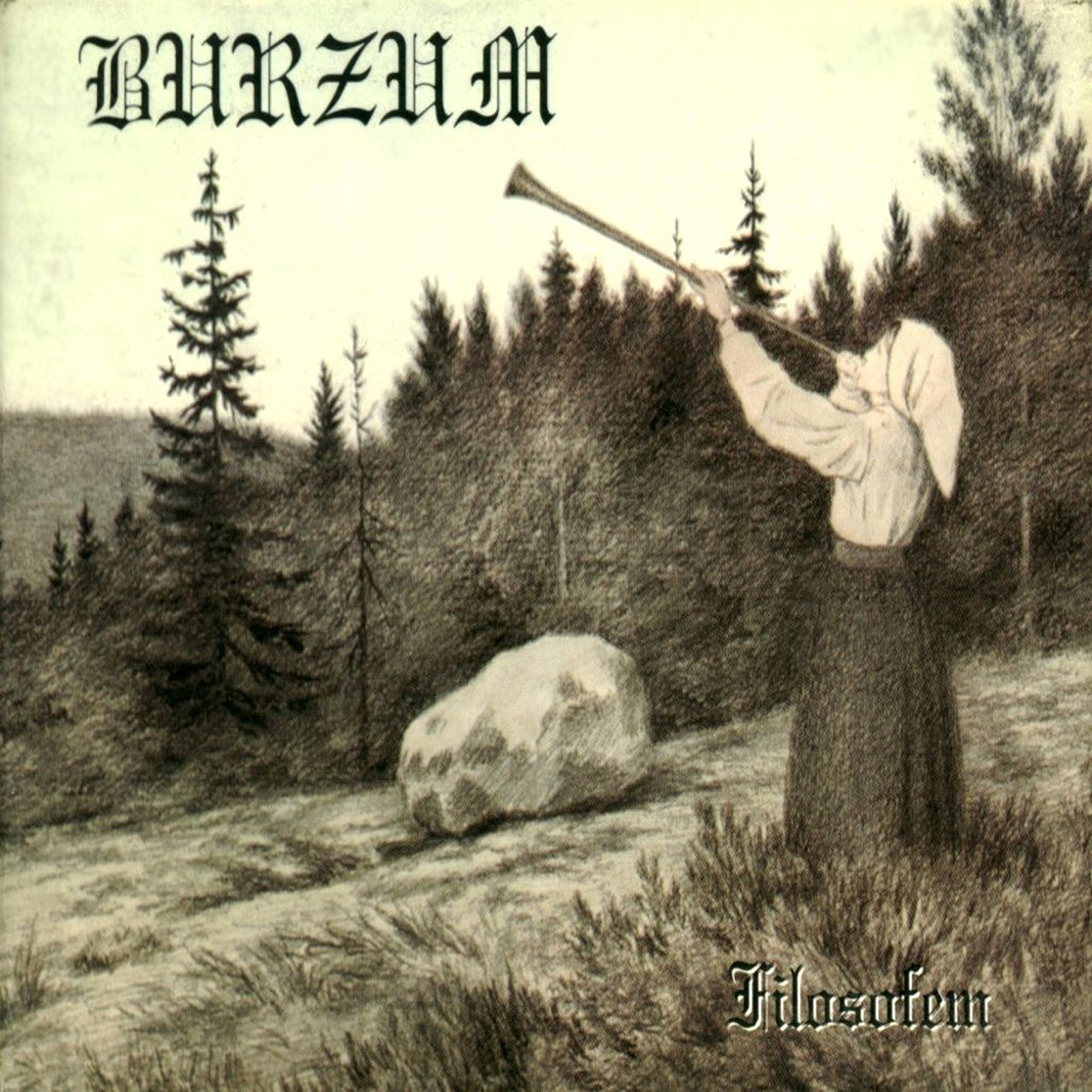

Studio album by Burzum
- Released: 31 January 1996
- Recorded: March 1993 at Breidablik Studio
- Genres: Black metal; dark ambient
- Length: 64:34
- Languages: Norwegian, English
- Labels: Misanthropy, Cymophane
- Producers: Varg Vikernes, Pytten

Burzum chronology
Hvis lyset tar oss (1994)	Filosofem (1996)	Dauði Baldrs (1997)

Professional ratings
Review scores
Source	Rating
AllMusic	4/5 stars

Filosofem (Norwegian for "Philosopheme") is the fourth studio album by Norwegian black metal solo project Burzum. It was recorded in March 1993 and was the last recording before Varg Vikernes was sentenced to prison in 1994; the album was not released until January 1996, however. It was released through Misanthropy Records and Vikernes's own record label, Cymophane Productions. A music video was made for the song "Dunkelheit" and received airtime on both MTV and VH1.

The album is noted for its experimental sound when compared to most other second wave black metal. Vikernes considers Filosofem an "anti-trend album."

In 2013, Decibel ranked Filosofem at number nine on its list of the Top 100 Black Metal Albums of All Time.

== Background ==
Varg Vikernes recorded the first four Burzum albums between January 1992 and March 1993 at the Grieg Hall in Bergen. However, the releases were spread out, with many months between the recording and the release of each album. During this time, Vikernes became a part of the early Norwegian black metal scene and met Mayhem guitarist Euronymous. He also took part in burning down four churches, along with other members of the scene. In August 1993, Vikernes stabbed Euronymous to death outside his apartment in Oslo. He was arrested nine days later and, in May 1994, was sentenced to 21 years in prison for both the murder, and for church arson.

The album's opening track, "Dunkelheit", was the first song Vikernes wrote as Burzum, with the song itself initially being named "Burzum". It had been recorded in September 1992 for the Hvis lyset tar oss album, but Vikernes was unhappy with it due to how poor the recording quality was, so it went unused. Instead he re-recorded the track six months later which is the version that appears on Filosofem. According to a statement made by Vikernes on burzum.org, the master tapes for the version of "Burzum" meant for Hvis lyset tar oss were lost by the Norwegian prison system.

Filosofem was recorded under purposefully bad conditions in order to retain a raw lo-fi sound. No guitar amplifier was used; instead Vikernes plugged his guitar into the amplifier of his brother's stereo and used old fuzz pedals. For the vocals, he asked a sound technician for the worst microphone he had, and ended up using an old helicopter headset.

== Music and artwork ==
The music of Filosofem continued Vikernes's experimentation with minimalism, repetition, and ambient music within black metal. The first three songs are in the key of E minor, and all tracks of the album are quite long in duration (the shortest being just over seven minutes), being primarily composed around very few musical motifs. For instance, "Jesu' død", a track of over eight-and-a-half minutes, is primarily based on variations of a single riff. The epic "Rundtgåing av den transcendentale egenhetens støtte", Burzum's longest ambient song to date, repeats a simple melody for nearly the entirety of the runtime, switching from a bass ostinato to a harmony ostinato midway through the piece. The song was featured in the soundtrack album of the American experimental drama film Gummo.

"Burzum" ("Dunkelheit"), the opening track, features a prominent melody played by a synthesizer that sits atop the distorted guitars and vocals. The two "Decrepitude" tracks complement each other, with ".i." featuring vocals and keeping the guitars in the foreground; while ".ii." is instrumental and instead focuses on the sound effects and keyboard melody in the background of ".i.".

The album cover and booklet contain artwork by Theodor Kittelsen. The front cover is named Op under Fjeldet toner en Lur (Norwegian for "Up in the hills a clarion call rings out").

== Track listing ==
CD, cassette and vinyl reissue pressings

All tracks are written by Varg Vikernes.

No.	Title	German version	Length
1.	"Burzum" ("Darkness")	"Dunkelheit"	7:05
2.	"Jesu død" ("Jesus' Death")	"Jesus' Tod"	8:39
3.	"Beholding the Daughters of the Firmament"	"Erblicket die Töchter des Firmaments"	7:53
4.	"Decrepitude .i."	"Gebrechlichkeit .i." ("Frailty .i.")	7:53
5.	"Rundtgåing av den transcendentale egenhetens støtte" ("Circumambulation of the Transcendental Columns of Singularity")	"Rundgang um die transzendentale Säule der Singularität"	25:11
6.	"Decrepitude .ii."	"Gebrechlichkeit .ii." ("Frailty .ii.")	7:53
Total length:			64:34

- Cassette pressings start side B with "Rundtgåing". Vinyl reissues from 2005 onward feature "Rundtgåing" on side C and "Decrepitude .ii." on side D.

Original vinyl pressing

Side A
No.	Title	German version	Length
1.	"Burzum" ("Darkness")	"Dunkelheit"	7:05
2.	"Jesu død" ("Jesus' Death")	"Jesus' Tod"	8:39
3.	"Beholding the Daughters of the Firmament"	"Erblicket die Töchter des Firmaments"	7:53
Total length:			23:37

Side B
No.	Title	German version	Length
1.	"Decrepitude .i."	"Gebrechlichkeit .i." ("Frailty .i.")	7:53
2.	"Decrepitude .ii."	"Gebrechlichkeit .ii." ("Frailty .ii.")	7:53
Total length:			15:46

Side C
No.	Title	German version	Length
1.	"Rundtgåing av den transcendentale egenhetens støtte" ("Circumambulation of the Transcendental Columns of Singularity")	"Rundgang um die transzendentale Säule der Singularität"	25:11
Total length:			25:11

== Personnel ==
- Count Grishnackh (Varg Vikernes) – vocals, guitar, bass, synthesizer, drums, sound effects, production
- Pytten – production
