= Dauði Baldrs =

1997 studio album by Burzum

Studio album by Burzum
- Released: 14 October 1997
- Recorded: 1994–1995
- Genre: Neo-classical; ambient; medieval; dungeon synth
- Length: 39:10
- Label: Misanthropy
- Producer: Varg Vikernes

Burzum chronology
Filosofem (1996)	Dauði Baldrs (1997)	Hliðskjálf (1999)

Alternative cover
- Cover of the "Balder's død" release of this album

Dauði Baldrs (Old Norse for "Baldr's Death" or "The Death of Baldr") is the fifth studio album by the Norwegian solo act Burzum. Unlike Burzum's previous work, which was mostly black metal, this is an ambient album. It was recorded using a synthesizer and a normal tape recorder by Varg Vikernes while he was in prison, as he was not allowed to have any other instruments or recording equipment. It was completed in a few months due to his limited access to synthesizers, which was also the case with the following album, Hliðskjálf.

== Music ==
Stylistically, the album is a mix of medieval music, ambient, neoclassical and minimalism, a distinct change from the raw black metal that characterized Burzum's earlier work. Some songs are very folk-driven and medieval, while some are sparse, hypnotic, ambient minimalist songs, particularly "Illa tiðandi". The album has been described by many as "dungeon synth". "Móti Ragnarokum" contains monophonic sections mixed with other thicker sections. "Illa tiðandi" is easily the most minimalist track, with only two sections being repeated over the 10:29 duration, which are both simple piano melodies, eventually accompanied by a choral chant.

"Illa tiðandi" is an alternative version of the song "Decrepitude I", while "Bálferð Baldrs" is an ambient version of the main riff from the song "Jesu død". "Moti Ragnarokum" is an extended, ambient version of the song "Mace Attack". Two of these songs appeared on Burzum's previous album Filosofem.

The song "Dauði Baldrs" was later re-arranged into a black metal style as the song "Belus død" on the 2010 album Belus, although it was composed as a black metal song in 1994 on Wotans Verhängnis, an early, unreleased prison demo tape, under the title "Oðinns Dauðr". In 2021, Wotans Verhängnis was officially released for the first time as the B-side of a compilation of early Burzum material, with the A-side being The Fighting Uruk-Hai, a tape recorded between 1989 and 1990 by Varg's pre-Burzum band Uruk-Hai.

== Name and release ==
The album was originally named Balders Død. The Misanthropy promo CD sent out before the album's release had this title, as well as a different cover. Furthermore, some copies of the album have a misprint of the Burzum logo, spelling it "Burzu". Rare original pressings of the LP include an eight-page booklet with artwork and Norwegian text as well as a set of six tarot cards. The swastika-adorned cloak worn by a man on the cover is an almost exact copy of the cloak worn by the character Thordur in When the Raven Flies.

== Reception ==
Professional ratings
Review scores
Source	Rating
AllMusic	3.5/5 stars
Sputnikmusic	1.5/5 stars

== Track listing ==
All tracks by Varg Vikernes.

No.	Title	Length
1.	"Dauði Baldrs" ("The Death of Baldr")	8:49
2.	"Hermoðr á Helferð" ("Hermóðr on a Journey to Hel")	2:41
3.	"Bálferð Baldrs" ("Baldr's Balefire")	6:05
4.	"Í heimr Heljar" ("In Hel's Home")	2:02
5.	"Illa tiðandi" ("Ill Tidings")	10:29
6.	"Móti Ragnarǫkum" ("Towards Ragnarök")	9:04
Total length:		39:10

== Credits ==
- Varg Vikernes – synthesizers, audio engineering, songwriting
- Pytten – mastering
