= Av Norrøn Ætt =

Studio album by Helheim
- Released: 1997
- Recorded: Grieghallen Studio
- Genre: Black metal, Viking metal
- Length: 55:16
- Label: Solistitium Records
- Producer: Pytten

Helheim chronology
Jormundgand (1995)	Av Norrøn Ætt (1997)	Blod og Ild (2000)

Av Norrøn Ætt is Helheim's 2nd full-length album, released in 1997.

Guest Appearance: - Haldis: Violin, Belinda: Sopran & Trumpet

== Track listing ==
1. En Forgangen Tid (A Bygone Era) – 2:54
2. Vinterdøden (The Winter-death) – 10:21
3. Fra Ginnunga-gap Til Evig Tid (From Ginnungagap To Eternal Time) – 6:49
4. Mørk, Evig Vinter (Dark, Eternal Winter) – 9:24
5. Åpenbaringens Natt (The Night of Revelation) – 7:26
6. De Eteriske Åndevesenes Skumringsdans (The Ethereal Spirit-creatures' Twilight-dance) – 8:46
7. Av Norrøn Ætt (Of Norse Lineage) – 9:36
