= Burzum (album) =

Studio album by Burzum
- Released: March 1992
- Recorded: January 1992
- Studios: Grieg Hall, Bergen, Norway
- Genres: Black metal, dark ambient
- Length: 47:05 (original); 58:06 (reissue)
- Label: Deathlike Silence
- Producers: Pytten; Count Grishnackh; Euronymous (Note: Only the original pressing credits him as "co-producer".)

Burzum chronology
Burzum (1992)	Aske (1993)

Professional ratings
Review scores
Source	Rating
AllMusic	(Burzum / Aske version)

Burzum is the debut studio album by the Norwegian black metal solo project Burzum. It was released in March 1992, through Euronymous's label Deathlike Silence Productions. Six of the songs were later re-recorded in 2010 and released on the album From the Depths of Darkness, as Varg Vikernes was dissatisfied with some of the original vocals and production.

Most reissues of the album have been released as Burzum/Aske which includes the Aske EP as the final three tracks. Only the Aske version of "A Lost Forgotten Sad Spirit" was included on this edition.

It is considered a landmark in the black metal genre.

== Music ==
Gregory Heaney of AllMusic said Burzum has a "trancelike sound that hypnotizes listeners with its buzzing guitars and ever-present blastbeats that give the music a repetitive, almost ritual-like quality."

== Legacy ==
Gregory Heaney of AllMusic gave the album four and a half stars out of five and said it was "definitely an essential listen for any black metal fan."

In 2018, Revolver wrote: "Remarkable for its militaristic severity and creepy synth ambience, Burzum remains one of black metal’s earliest masterpieces."

In 2013, Decibel ranked it at number 21 on its list of the Top 100 Black Metal Albums of All Time.

== Track listing ==
All music and lyrics by Varg Vikernes except "Ea, Lord of the Deeps", words taken from the Necronomicon.

=== Original Pressing ===
Side Hate
No.	Title	Length
1.	"Feeble Screams from Forests Unknown"	7:28
2.	"Ea, Lord of the Deeps"	4:52
3.	"Black Spell of Destruction"	5:39
4.	"Channelling the Power of Souls into a New God"	3:27

Side Winter
No.	Title	Length
5.	"War"	2:30
6.	"The Crying Orc"	0:58
7.	"A Lost Forgotten Sad Spirit"	9:11
8.	"My Journey to the Stars"	8:10
9.	"Dungeons of Darkness"	4:50
Total length:		47:05

=== Burzum/Aske ===
No.	Title	Length
1.	"Feeble Screams from Forests Unknown"	7:28
2.	"Ea, Lord of the Depths"	4:52
3.	"Spell of Destruction"	5:39
4.	"Channelling the Power of Souls into a New God"	3:27
5.	"War"	2:30
6.	"The Crying Orc"	0:58
7.	"My Journey to the Stars"	8:10
8.	"Dungeons of Darkness"	4:50
9.	"Stemmen Fra Taarnet"	6:08
10.	"Dominus Sathanas"	3:04
11.	"A Lost Forgotten Sad Spirit"	10:52
Total length:		58:06

Note: Burzum/Aske renames track 3 as "Spell of Destruction" as Vikernes claims the word "Black" was added to the title by Euronymous without his knowledge. Track 2 is also amended to "Ea, Lord of the Depths".

== Personnel ==
Burzum

- Count Grishnackh – vocals, guitar, bass guitar, drums, synthesizer, production

Additional credits

- Euronymous – guitar solo on "War", gong on "Dungeons of Darkness", production (Only the original and 2022 pressings list the "Co-Producer" credit.)
- Pytten (Eirik Hundvin) – engineering, mastering, production
- Jannicke Wiese-Hansen – album artwork (artwork is a partial re-creation of The Temple of Elemental Evil's cover art.)
