= Deathlike Silence Productions =

Norwegian independent record label

- Founded: 1987 (as Posercorpse Music)
- Founder: Euronymous
- Defunct: 1994
- Distributor: Voices of Wonder
- Genre: Black metal
- Country of origin: Norway
- Location: Oslo

Deathlike Silence Productions (DSP) was a Norwegian independent record label founded in Oslo in 1987 (initially as Posercorpse Music) that focused on black metal. DSP supported the Norwegian black metal scene in the early 1990s. Helvete was the headquarters of DSP.

== History ==
The label was founded in 1987 by Øystein Aarseth, also known as Euronymous, who operated the label until his murder in 1993. The name was derived from the Sodom song "Deathlike Silence" (from their 1986 release Obsessed by Cruelty).

At first, the label mainly signed Norwegian acts, but as early as 1990 Aarseth had desired to establish a Swedish branch with Morgan Håkansson of Marduk, and towards its final years its also released an album by Japanese artist Sigh. Aarseth was considering signing Rotting Christ, Masacre (Colombia) and Hadez (Peru) before his death.

Before the label's demise in 1994, it was planned to release Monumentum's debut album In Absentia Christi. Darkthrone had threatened to release their second album A Blaze in the Northern Sky through Deathlike Silence when Peaceville Records would not due to their sudden change in genre. Voices of Wonder "took over Deathlike Silence Productions after the death of Euronymous."

== Releases on DSP ==
- Anti-Mosh 001: Merciless – The Awakening (1990)
- Anti-Mosh 002: Burzum – Burzum (1992)
- Anti-Mosh 003: Mayhem – Deathcrush (1993) (Note: Re-release of the original Deathcrush from 1987.)
- Anti-Mosh 004: Abruptum – Obscuritatem Advoco Amplectére Me (1993) (Note: Latin for The Call of Darkness Embraces Me.)
- Anti-Mosh 005: Burzum – Aske (1993)
- Anti-Mosh 006: Mayhem – De Mysteriis Dom Sathanas (1994)
- Anti-Mosh 007: Sigh – Scorn Defeat (1993)
- Anti-Mosh 008: Enslaved – Vikingligr Veldi (1994)
- Anti-Mosh 009: Abruptum – In Umbra Malitiae Ambulabo, in Aeternum in Triumpho Tenebraum (1994) (Note: Latin for In the Shadow of Evil I Will Walk, Forever in Dark Triumph.)

== See also ==
- Lists of record labels
