= Varg Vikernes =

Norwegian musician and murderer (born 1973)

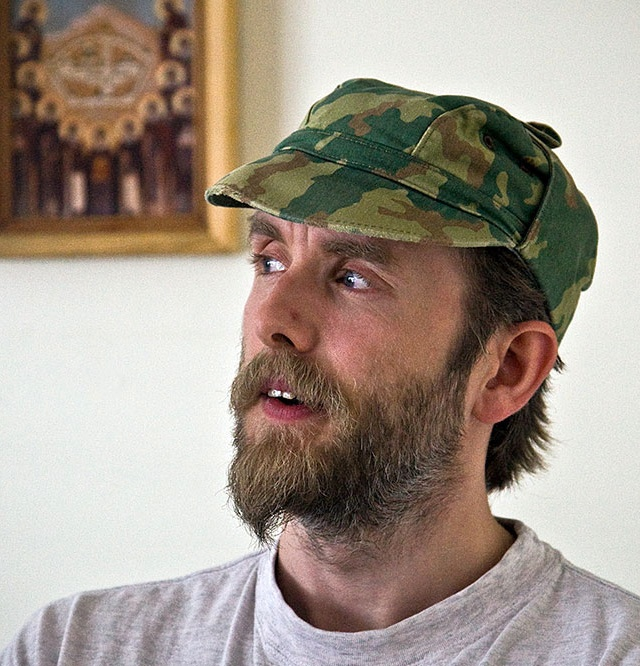
- Vikernes in prison, 2008
- Born: Kristian Vikernes; 11 February 1973 (age 53); Fana, Bergen, Norway
- Other names: Count Grishnackh; Greven; Louis Cachet
- Occupations: Musician; author; game designer
- Years active: 1988–present
- Known for: Early Norwegian black metal scene; church arson; murder of Euronymous
- Spouse: Marie Cachet (m. 2007)
- Children: 8
- Musical career
- Genres: Black metal; dark ambient; folk
- Instruments: Guitar; bass; drums; synthesizer; vocals
- Member of: Burzum; Hyperborea Rising
- Formerly of: Uruk-Hai; Old Funeral; Satanel; Mayhem
- Criminal information
- Criminal charges: First-degree murder, arson, and possession of 150 kg of explosives (1994); inciting racial hatred (2013)
- Penalty: 21 years in prison (1994); 6 months probation and a €8,000 fine (2013)
- Website: thuleanperspective.com; burzum.org

Louis Cachet (born Kristian Vikernes; (Note: Written as "Christian" in some sources.) 11 February 1973), better known as Varg Vikernes (Norwegian: [ˈvɑrɡ ˈvìːkəɳeːs]), is a Norwegian musician, neo-Nazi, convicted murderer and serial arsonist. He released five albums under the name Burzum between 1992 and 1996, making him an influential figure in the early Norwegian black metal scene and its offshoot National Socialist black metal (NSBM). In May 1994, Vikernes was convicted of first-degree murder for the fatal stabbing of guitarist Øystein "Euronymous" Aarseth. He was also convicted of arson for the burning of four Christian churches in Norway. Vikernes was sentenced to 21 years in prison, and was released after having served 15 years.

A native of Fana in Bergen Municipality, Vikernes went on to join the band Old Funeral, in which he played guitar from 1989 until his departure in 1991. He recorded multiple tracks with the band, which were featured on the Devoured Carcass EP, as well as various compilation albums released years later. In 1992–1993, he also recorded bass for Mayhem's debut studio album De Mysteriis Dom Sathanas (1994).

In 1992, Vikernes, along with other members of the scene, was suspected of burning down four Christian churches in Norway. In August 1993, he fatally stabbed Mayhem guitarist Aarseth during an altercation at the latter's apartment, and was arrested shortly after. In May 1994, Vikernes was convicted of first-degree murder, church arson and possession of explosives. Vikernes has always maintained the killing was self-defense, and unsuccessfully argued for the charge to be reduced to voluntary manslaughter. He has denied committing the arsons, though he supported them. He was sentenced to 21 years in prison, the maximum penalty under Norwegian law. During his incarceration, Vikernes launched the neo-Nazi organisation Norsk Hedensk Front ('Norwegian Heathen Front'), had two books published, and released two ambient albums as Burzum. In 2009, he was released on parole. Afterwards, he moved to a small farm in Corrèze, France, with his wife and changed his name to Louis Cachet. In 2014, he was found guilty by a French court of inciting racial hatred against Jews and Muslims on his YouTube channel, Thulean Perspective, and sentenced to six months' probation.

Described by Sam Dunn as "the most notorious metal musician of all time", Vikernes remains controversial for his crimes as well as his political and religious views. He promoted views which combined Odinism and Esoteric Nazism, and openly embraced Nazism during the mid-to-late 1990s. He has continued to be associated with far-right politics.

== Biography ==
=== Background and childhood ===
Vikernes was born on 11 February 1973 in Bergen. In the interviews printed in the 1998 book Lords of Chaos, Vikernes discusses his background and childhood. Lords of Chaos also includes an interview with his mother, Helene Bore (the book and a newspaper depicted there refer to her with the given name Lene). In a 2004 interview, Vikernes said his mother was "working in a large oil company". His father is an electronics engineer, and his older brother is a civil engineer.

In the Lords of Chaos interview, Vikernes recalls that when he was 6 years old, the family moved for about a year to Baghdad, Iraq, because Vikernes' "father was working for Saddam Hussein" developing a computer program. Since there were no places available in the English school in Baghdad, the young Vikernes went to an Iraqi elementary school during this time. According to his interview, Vikernes here became "aware of racial matters". Corporal punishment was very common in the school, and on one occasion, Vikernes had a "quarrel" with a teacher and called him "a monkey" – but, as Vikernes perceived it, the teachers "didn't dare to hit me because I was white". Vikernes' mother also recalls that "the other children in his class would get slapped by their teachers; he would not". She mentions that this created problems, but generally she "has no good explanation" of how Varg developed his views.

When asked about his father, Vikernes states that he was hysterical that his son "had a swastika flag at home". Vikernes feels that his father was a hypocrite because he was worried about Vikernes "being a Nazi", whereas he too was "pissed about all the colored people he saw in town". About his mother, Vikernes states that she was "very race-conscious", in the sense that she was afraid that Vikernes "was going to come home with a black girl[!]". At the time of the 1995 Lords of Chaos interview, Vikernes still had a positive relationship with his mother but "very little contact" with his father. He also stated that his parents are divorced; Vikernes' father is said to have "left about 10 years ago", which would have been 1985, when Vikernes was 11 or 12.

According to the Encyclopedia of White Power and historian Nicholas Goodrick-Clarke, Vikernes was part of the neo-Nazi skinhead culture as an adolescent. When asked in the Lords of Chaos interview whether he hung out with skinheads in Bergen, Vikernes said that "there were no skinheads in Bergen".

Vikernes discovered other metal bands whose sound would be influential on his own band, such as Kreator, Sodom, Celtic Frost, Bathory, Destruction, Slayer, Pestilence, Deicide and Von. Although Venom are widely considered the primary influence on black metal, Vikernes has always denied to be influenced by them, as well as defining the band as "a joke". He once wore a T-shirt of Venom's Black Metal to promote the genre but stated he later regretted doing that.

=== Early musical career ===
Vikernes started playing guitar at the age of 14. When he was 17, Vikernes came into contact with members of Old Funeral. He played guitar with them during 1990–1991 and performed on their Devoured Carcass EP before he began his solo musical project, Burzum, and quickly became involved with the early Norwegian black metal scene. During 1992–1993, he recorded four albums as Burzum.

On Hvis lyset tar oss, he also borrowed Hellhammer's drum kit, the same one Hellhammer used to record De Mysteriis Dom Sathanas by Mayhem. In 1992, Vikernes joined the black metal band Mayhem, a year after band member Dead committed suicide on 8 April 1991.

=== Arson of churches ===
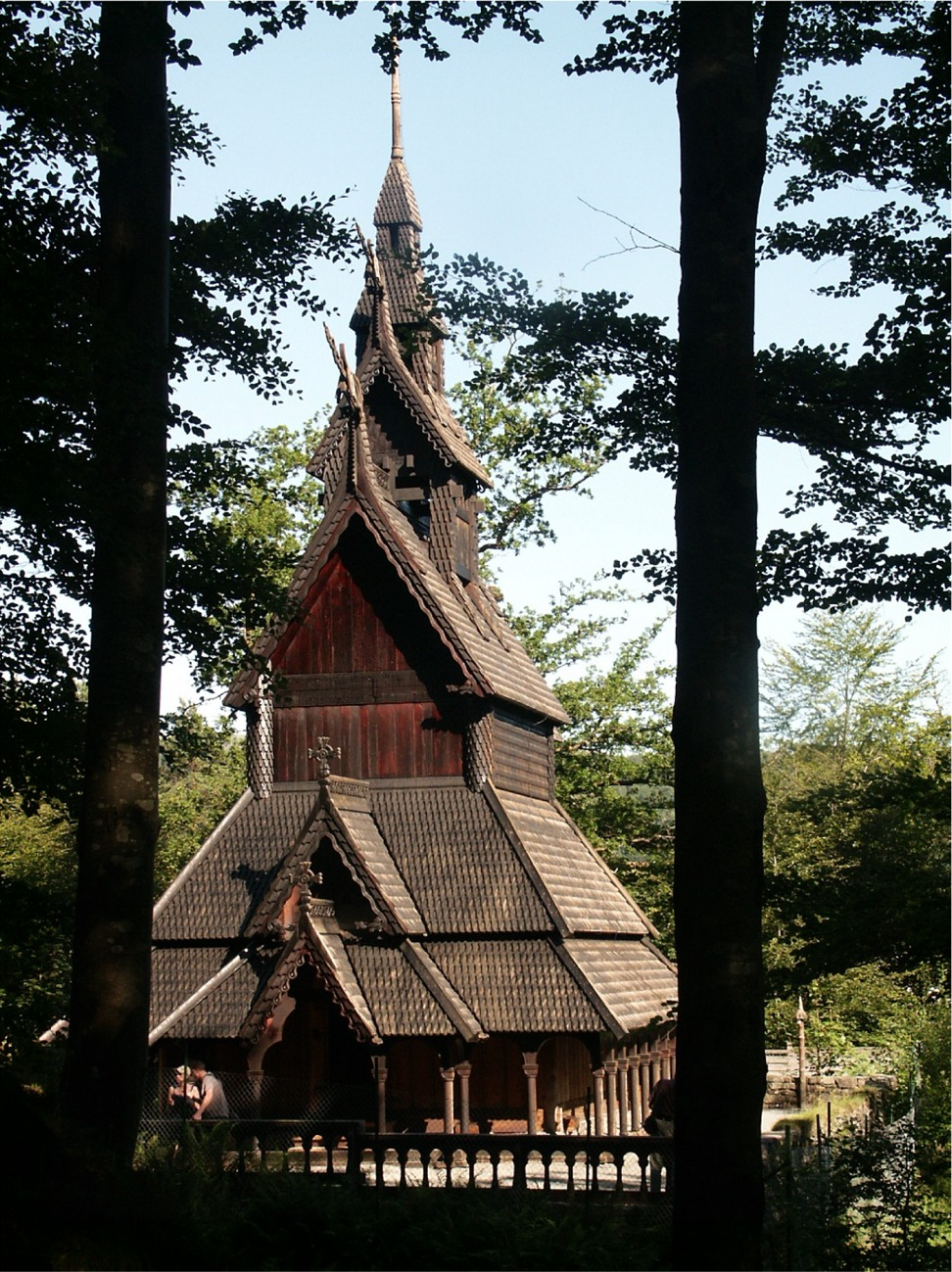
The Fantoft Stave Church, restored in 1997

On 6 June 1992, the Fantoft Stave Church, dating from the 12th century and considered architecturally significant, was burned to the ground by arson. The cover of Burzum's EP Aske ("ashes") is a photograph of the destroyed church. By January 1993, arson attacks had occurred on at least seven other major stave churches, including one on Christmas Eve of 1992. Vikernes was found guilty of several of these cases: the arson and attempted arson of Åsane Church and Storetveit Church in Bergen Municipality, the arson of Skjold Church in Vindafjord Municipality, and the arson of Holmenkollen Chapel in Oslo Municipality. He was also charged with the arson of Fantoft Stave Church, although the jurors found him not guilty.

At the time, media outlets reported that Vikernes was associated with theistic Satanism. In later interviews Vikernes, while not accepting responsibility for the arsons, said that they were not Satanic, but instead "revenge" for the Christian desecration of Viking graves and temples. According to Vikernes, the arsons were on the anniversary of the Lindisfarne Viking raid. Vikernes claimed that all the burnings, except for the one at Stavanger, were done by one person. His arsons inspired similar attacks on churches in other countries over many years.

==== Bergens Tidende article ====
In January 1993, an article in one of Norway's biggest newspapers, Bergens Tidende, brought the black metal scene into the media spotlight. Two friends of Vikernes interviewed him and brought the interview to the newspaper, hoping they would print it. In the anonymous interview, "Count Grishnackh" (Vikernes) claimed to have burnt the churches and killed a man in Lillehammer. BT journalist Finn Bjørn Tønder set up a meeting with Count Grishnackh with help from the friends. The journalists were summoned to an apartment and reportedly warned that they would be shot if the police were called. There, Vikernes and his companions told the journalists that they had burnt the churches, or knew who had done it, and said that the attacks would continue. They claimed to be devil worshippers and said: "Our intention is to spread fear and devilry [...] that is why we are telling this to Bergens Tidende." They gave the journalists details about the arsons that hadn't been released to the press, so BT spoke with the police before publishing it, who confirmed these details.

The article was published on 20 January as the front page of the BT. It was headlined "We Lit the Fires" and included a photo of Vikernes, his face mostly hidden, holding two large knives. However, by the time the article was printed, Vikernes had already been arrested. The police found him by going to an address printed on a Burzum flyer.

At the time, Burzum was about to release the Aske mini-album. Some of the other scene members were also arrested and questioned, but all were released for lack of evidence. Jørn Inge Tunsberg of Hades said that the interview had "grave consequences" for the rest of the scene and that they did not know he was going to talk to the press, as "he had said nothing". He added that they became "bloody angry" and he, Tunsberg, was "pissed off".

Norwegian magazine Rock Furore published an interview with Vikernes in February 1993. In it, he said of the prison system: "It's much too nice here. It's not hell at all. In this country prisoners get a bed, toilet and shower. It's completely ridiculous. I asked the police to throw me in a real dungeon, and also encouraged them to use violence". He was released in March for lack of evidence.

=== Murder of Euronymous ===
In early 1993, animosity arose between Euronymous and Vikernes. After the Bergens Tidende episode, Euronymous decided to shut Helvete down as it began to draw the attention of the police and media.

On the night of 10 August 1993, Vikernes stabbed Euronymous to death at his apartment in Oslo. The murder was initially blamed on Swedish black metallers by the media. It has been speculated that the murder was the result of a power struggle, a financial dispute over Burzum records (Euronymous owed Vikernes a large sum of royalty payments), or an attempt at "outdoing" a recent stabbing in Lillehammer committed by Emperor drummer Faust. Vikernes claims that he killed Euronymous in self-defense. He says that Euronymous had plotted to stun him with an electroshock weapon, tie him up, and torture him to death while videotaping the event. Vikernes explains: "If he was talking about it to everybody and anybody I wouldn't have taken it seriously. But he just told a select group of friends, and one of them told me". He said Euronymous planned to use a meeting about an unsigned contract to ambush him.

On the night of the murder, Vikernes and Snorre "Blackthorn" Ruch drove from Bergen to Euronymous' apartment at Tøyengata in Oslo. Blackthorn allegedly stood in the stairwell smoking while Vikernes went to Euronymous' apartment on the fourth floor. Vikernes said he met Euronymous at the door to hand him the signed contract, but when he stepped forward and confronted Euronymous, Euronymous "panicked" and kicked him in the chest. Vikernes claims Euronymous ran into the kitchen to fetch a knife. The two got into a struggle and Vikernes stabbed Euronymous to death. His body was found in the stairwell on the first floor with 23 stab wounds—two to the head, five to the neck, and 16 to the back. Vikernes contended that most of Euronymous' wounds were caused by broken glass he had fallen on during the struggle. After the murder, Vikernes and Blackthorn drove back to Bergen. On the way, they stopped at a lake where Vikernes disposed of his bloodstained clothes. This claim of self-defense is doubted by Emperor drummer Faust, but Mayhem bassist Necrobutcher believed Vikernes did kill Euronymous due to the aforementioned death threats.

Blackthorn claimed Vikernes planned to murder Euronymous and pressured him into coming along. He claimed that, in the summer of 1993, he was almost committed to a mental hospital but fled to Bergen and stayed with Vikernes. Blackthorn said of the murder, "I was neither for nor against it. I didn't give a shit about Øystein". Vikernes, however, claims that he had not planned the killing and that Blackthorn came along to show Euronymous some new guitar riffs.

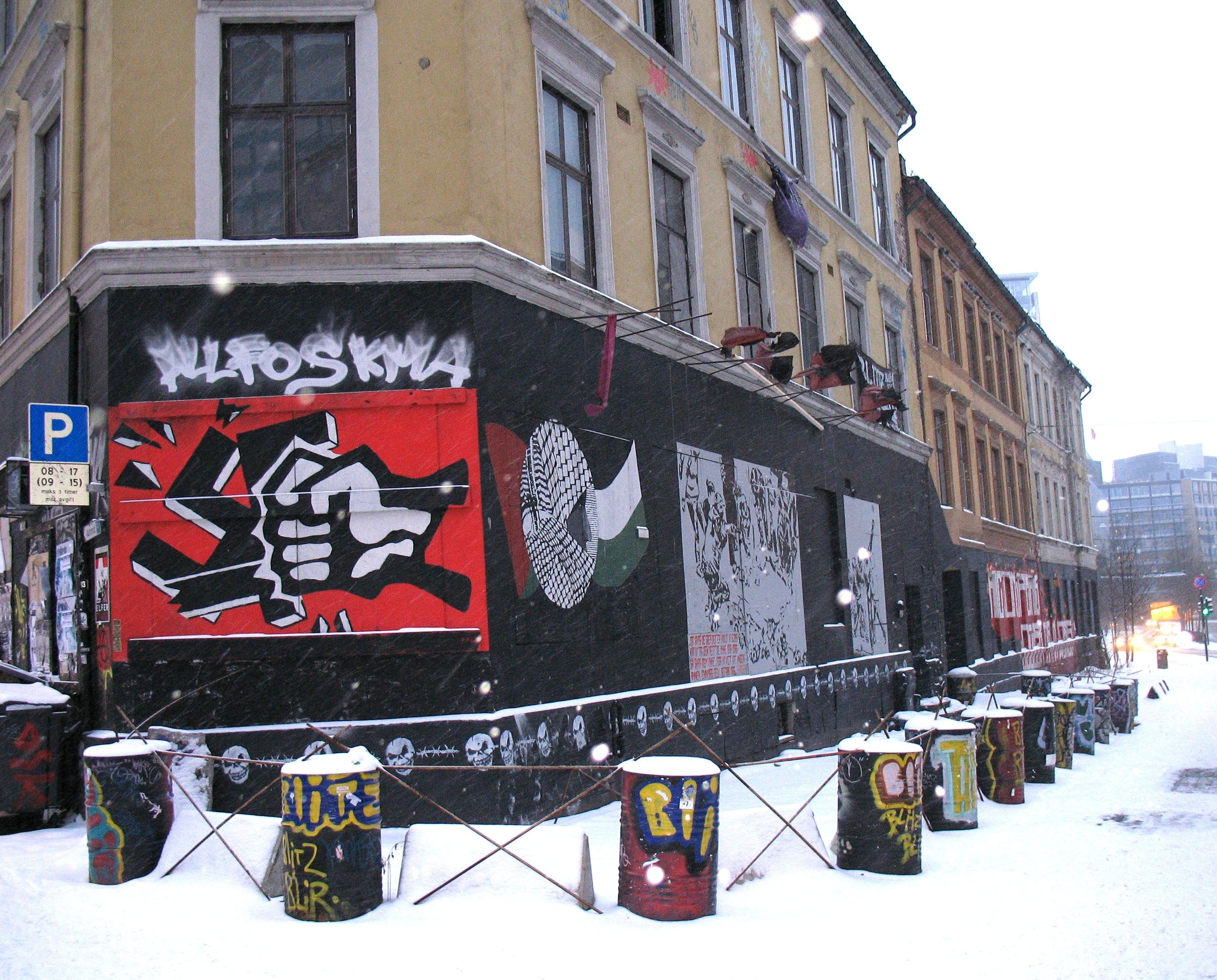
The Blitz House, which Vikernes allegedly planned to blow up in 1993.

Vikernes was arrested on 19 August 1993 in Bergen. The police found 150 kg of explosives and 3,000 rounds of ammunition in his home. According to the Encyclopedia of White Power, Vikernes "intended to blow up Blitz House, the radical leftist and anarchist enclave in Oslo", a plan that "was reportedly on the verge of execution." In an article originally published in 1999, Kevin Coogan also mentioned Vikernes' alleged intent to "destroy an Oslo-based punk anti-fascist squat called Blitz House", and stated "Vikernes may have felt that he had no choice but to kill Euronymous before bombing Blitz House because 'the Communist' would almost certainly have opposed such an act." Vikernes denied these claims in a 2009 interview, saying he was collecting explosives and ammunition "in order to defend Norway if we were attacked any time."

==== Trial ====
Vikernes' trial began on 2 May 1994; he was represented by the lawyer Stein-Erik Mattsson. Many other members of the scene, including Blackthorn and Faust, were put on trial around the same time. Some of them confessed to their crimes and implicated others. According to Lords of Chaos, "Vikernes is disgusted by the fact that, while he held fast to a code of silence, others confessed."

During the trial, the media made Vikernes "the nation's first real bogeyman in fifty years". At the trial it was claimed that he, Blackthorn, and another friend had planned the murder. The court alleged that this third person stayed at the apartment in Bergen as an alibi; to make it look like they never left Bergen, he was to rent films, play them in the apartment, and withdraw money from Vikernes' credit card.

On 16 May 1994, Vikernes was sentenced to 21 years in prison (Norway's maximum penalty) for the murder of Euronymous, the arson of three churches, the attempted arson of a fourth church, and for the theft and storage of 150 kg of explosives. Though Vikernes only confessed to the theft and storage of the explosives, two churches were set on fire the day he was sentenced, "presumably as a statement of symbolic support". Blackthorn, who hadn't taken part in the murder as he had gone down the condominium's stairs to smoke, was sentenced to 8 years in prison for being an accomplice.

May 1994 also saw the release of Mayhem's album De Mysteriis Dom Sathanas, which has Euronymous on electric guitar and Vikernes on bass guitar. Before the release, Euronymous' family had asked Mayhem's drummer, Hellhammer, to remove the bass tracks recorded by Vikernes. Hellhammer said "I thought it was appropriate that the murderer and victim were on the same record. I put word out that I was re-recording the bass parts, but I never did."

=== Imprisonment ===
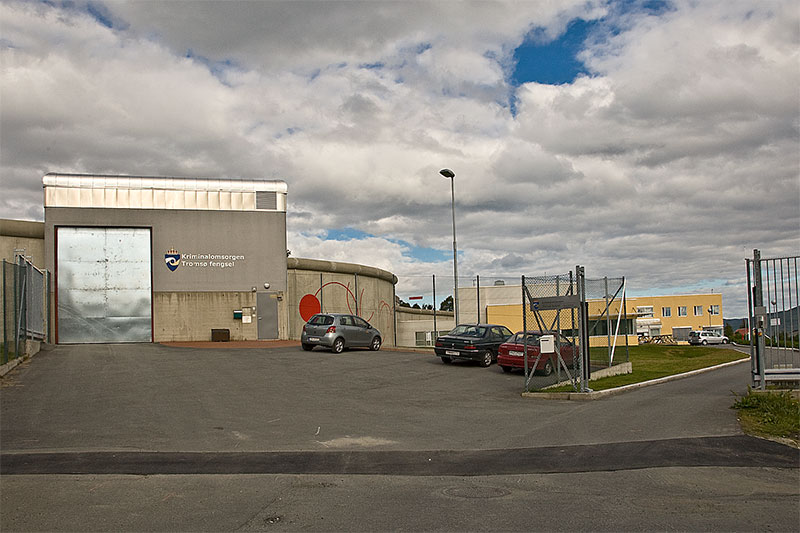
Tromsø Prison, where Vikernes served the last part of his sentence

Vikernes served his sentence at in Bergen, Tønsberg, Ullersmo, Ila, Ringerike, Trondheim, and Tromsø prisons.

Vikernes launched the Norsk Hedensk Front ('Norwegian Heathen Front') during his early years in prison. This was a neo-pagan, neo-Nazi group that grew into the Allgermanische Heidnische Front or 'Pan-Germanic Heathen Front' (AHF) with chapters in Denmark, Norway, the Netherlands, Russia, England, the Baltic countries, and the United States. Vikernes was its self-proclaimed leader, describing himself as "Chieftain" of the Norwegian Heathen Front in his self-published manifesto, Vargsmål ('Wolf Speak').

The Heathen Front officially denied that Vikernes was in charge, despite having the same postal address as Vikernes' in prison. According to Lords of Chaos, this may have been to protect him, as Norwegian prisoners were prohibited from leading political groups. The book states it would have been "very hard for [Vikernes] to do an effective job" at leading the organization, as all letters would have been screened by the prison personnel. Vikernes said "I have never formed or been a member of such organizations. The only organization I am a member of is Riksmålsforbundet" (The Society for the Preservation of Traditional Standard Norwegian). However, Vikernes did come into contact with the neo-Nazi group Zorn 88, and wrote articles in its magazine Gjallarhorn. One of the group's leading members, esotericist Jan Erik Kvamsdahl, helped Vikernes publish Vargsmål and set up the Heathen Front according to the Monitor organization.

On 8 April 1997, Norwegian police arrested five neo-Nazis in Hemnes Municipality. According to police, the young men were part of a self-styled "Einsatzgruppe" and were plotting attacks on political and religious figures in Norway. They also had plans to break Vikernes out of prison. The group "had all the trappings of a paramilitary unit", including guns, explosives, bulletproof vests, steel helmets and balaclavas. One of its members, Tom Eiternes, had befriended Vikernes in prison before escaping while on leave. Vikernes' mother, Lene Bore, was arrested for supplying the group with 100,000 kroner. She confessed, but claimed she did not know they were "right-wing extremists" and said her son was being attacked by fellow inmates. In late 1996, his jaw had reportedly been broken in a fight with another inmate. However, the prison director said her claims were unfounded, and police suspected that the money came from Vikernes himself. Lords of Chaos says that Vikernes adopted a "skinhead" look and wore a belt buckle with SS insignia around this time. Despite her confession, Bore was not convicted, and in 1998 the case against the "Einsatzgruppe" was dropped.

During his time in prison, Vikernes recorded two albums made up wholly of ambient and neofolk music. The first, Dauði Baldrs, was recorded in 1994–1995 and released in October 1997. The second, Hliðskjálf, was recorded in 1998 and released in April 1999. In the early 2000s Vikernes regularly wrote articles in the magazine of the neopagan neo-Nazi group Vigrid.

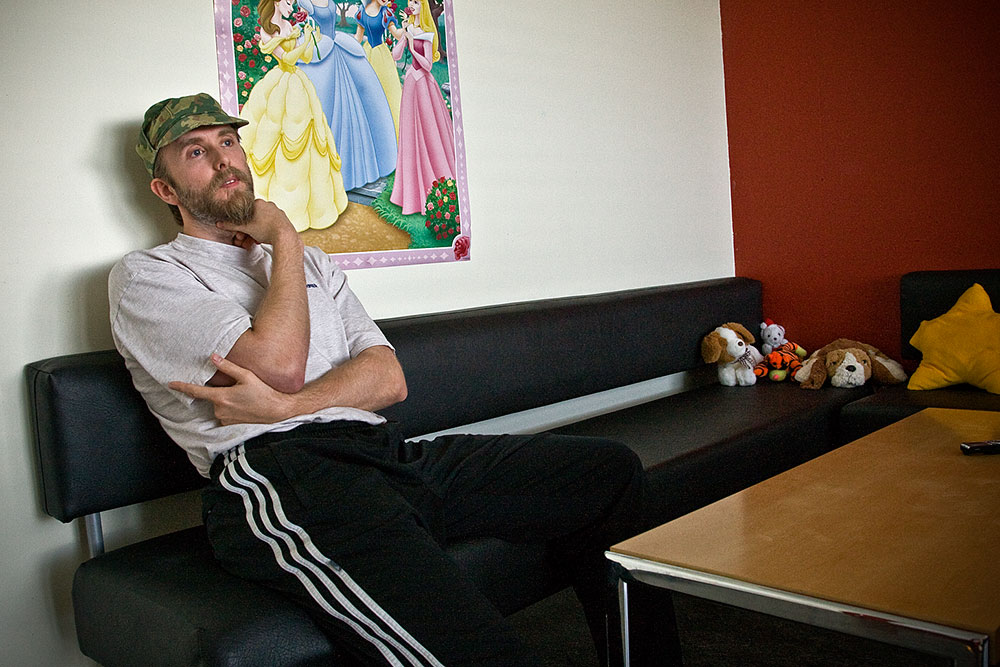
Vikernes in a family visiting room in prison, August 2008

In August 2003, Vikernes was transferred from a maximum-security prison in Bergen to the low-security prison in Tønsberg. On 15 October, the local paper, Tønsbergs Blad, published an article that criticised Vikernes. On 26 October, Vikernes went on the run after being granted a short leave. He stopped a car in Numedal. Inside it was a family of three, who said that he hijacked the car at gunpoint. About 19 hours later, police stopped the car in Romerike and arrested him. The car contained knives, a gas mask, camouflage clothing, a portable GPS navigator, maps, a compass, a laptop and a mobile phone. Police also found a handgun and a G3 automatic rifle in a cabin in Rollag Municipality, where Vikernes had hidden during his escape. They concluded that his escape "was well planned and involved assistance from several people on the outside". Before the escape, Vikernes gave his mother a letter. In it, he wrote that he had received death threats and another inmate had tried to strangle him shortly after the newspaper article was published. For his actions, thirteen months were added to Vikernes' sentence and he was moved to a prison in Ringerike. In July 2004, he was moved to a maximum-security prison in Trondheim. The last three years of his sentence were spent in Tromsø Prison.

When Vikernes was convicted, it was possible to be released on parole after serving 12 years of a 21-year sentence, but in 2002, before he became eligible, the Norwegian Parliament had extended this to 14 years. In June 2006, after serving 12 years, Vikernes was denied parole by the Department of Criminal Justice for this reason. His lawyer, John Christian Elden, has complained that the policy change is a form of retroactive legislation. Article 97 of the Norwegian constitution forbids any law being given retroactive force. Vikernes was denied parole again in June 2008, although he was allowed to leave Tromsø Prison for short periods to visit his family. His full sentence would run for another seven years. In March 2009, however, his parole was announced. He had then served nearly 15 years of his 21-year sentence. On 22 May 2009, he confirmed that he had been released from prison on probation.

=== Life after prison ===
Vikernes came to the attention of French authorities after receiving a copy of far-right terrorist Anders Behring Breivik's manifesto, which Breivik sent out before launching the 2011 Norway attacks, killing 77 people. Vikernes wrote on his blog that he agreed with many of Breivik's views, but that he suspected Breivik was actually part of a Jewish conspiracy.

Vikernes and his wife, a French national, were arrested at their home in Corrèze, France, on suspicion of planning acts of terrorism after his wife bought four rifles. Officials later stated that Vikernes' wife had a legal firearms permit to buy the rifles. The two were later released without charge after police failed to identify any terrorist plans or targets. Vikernes was instead charged by French authorities with inciting racial hatred against Jews and Muslims. This was due to posts on his blog, Thulean Perspective, some of which were taken down following the charges. Vikernes claimed he had not written the posts, although the blog attributed all posts to him. On 8 July 2014, Vikernes was convicted of inciting racial hatred and sentenced to six months of probation and a fine of €8,000.

In June 2018, Vikernes commented that he had "moved on" from Burzum on his YouTube channel, saying "bye bye" to the project. That same year, YouTube removed Vikernes's channel, Thulean Perspective, from the platform, coinciding with a new policy of prohibiting hate speech and content that promotes or justifies Nazi ideology. YouTube announced that it would be more aggressive in removing "videos alleging that a group is superior in order to justify discrimination, segregation or exclusion". In 2019, Vikernes said a new album was on the way. The 12th Burzum album, Thulêan Mysteries, was released in 2020.

== Writing ==
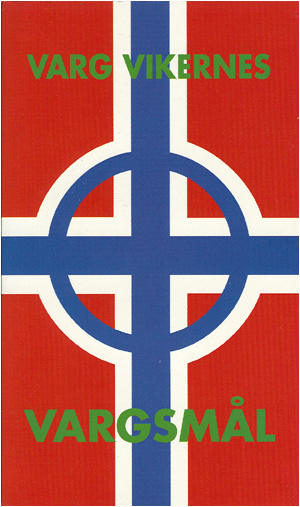
Vargsmål, written by Vikernes in 1994

In late 1994, while in prison, Vikernes wrote a Norwegian-language book called Vargsmål ('Varg's Speech'). Vikernes has said he wrote Vargsmål to defend himself against the media. According to Lords of Chaos, Vargsmål became available on the Internet for some time in 1996 but not in a printed form. In 1997, a Norwegian publisher released a paperback edition of the book; its publication was financed by Vikernes's mother, Helene Bore. As of 1999, Vargsmål was being sold by the Nazi organization Heathen Front via its website.

In 2011, Abstract Sounds Books published Vikernes's English book entitled Sorcery and Religion in Ancient Scandinavia. According to a review from the music blog Heathen Harvest, the book rejects accepted academic theories, instead focusing on "Vikernes's speculation and personalized story-telling".

Vikernes has self-published a tabletop role-playing game named MYFAROG (Mythic Fantasy Role-playing Game). In 2019, he announced that the upcoming ambient album of Burzum, Thulêan Mysteries, was also intended as background music for the game. The game has been criticized for its overcomplicated rule set as well as racist references; there are multiple nonplayable enemy races collectively referred to as Koparmenn ("copper men") who are described as filthy and animalistic, and presumably represent non-Europeans.

== Views ==
In Metal: A Headbanger's Journey, director Sam Dunn described Vikernes as "the most notorious metal musician of all time" due to his crimes as well as his political and religious views. While in prison, Vikernes promoted views which combined Odinism and Esoteric Nazism. Scholar of religion Egil Asprem characterized Vikernes as "an idol for skinheads with an inclination towards Paganism and for contemporary Pagans with an inclination towards National Socialism". He described himself as a Neo-Nazi following his 1994 conviction.

Vikernes wrote a blog post sympathetic to some of the views of Anders Behring Breivik, but said he suspected Breivik carried out his terrorist attack as part of a Jewish conspiracy. He condemned Breivik for killing innocent Norwegians and called him a "Christian loser", saying the only way to "save Europe" is to "cast aside all Christian and other international nonsense and embrace only the European (i.e. Pagan) values and ideals". Breivik has later in fact stated that he identifies as an Odinist, and that he wants Vikernes to be one of the leaders of a new Nazi party in Norway.

Rapper Kanye West has drawn scrutiny for his ties to Vikernes, which have included sampling Burzum's 1996 song "Rundgang um die transzendentale säule der singularität" in Gucci Mane's "Pussy Print", posing in a Burzum T-shirt, and allegedly modeling his Vultures album cover after one of Burzum's own albums. When asked about this, Vikernes expressed apathy toward West, writing "I know very little about him or what he says or does, and I kind of have very little incentive to 'find out'. it is better to spend time on something more fruitful." He later praised West for his support, saying, "I think it shows courage to publicly wear a Burzum shirt, like he has done. You risk the wrath (including boycott) of an entire music industry, completely under the control of… 'a certain group.' So kudos to him for that."

In August 2020, Vikernes posted a list on Twitter of countries he hates the most. The list is Israel, United States, India, Saudi Arabia, Sub-Saharan Africa, Thailand, Poland, Turkey, Brazil, and Iran. He also classified the Norwegian city of Oslo in 11th and declared he wanted to see Brazil depopulated. He suffered a vampetaço and as an answer called Brazilians Untermenschen. He received so many nudes of Vampeta that his profile was put on private afterwards. André Honorato, lead singer from Ossos Cruzados, created a political cartoon about the event that was reposted by João Gordo, lead singer from Ratos de Porão.

== Personal life ==
Vikernes and his French wife, Marie Cachet, have a son together who was born in 2007. The couple married the same year. In a 2008 interview, he said he and his wife were expecting a second child together (her second and his third). After his release from prison, he settled with his family on a small farm in Bø before they moved to Salon-la-Tour in France. Vikernes changed his legal name to Louis Cachet, still using the name Varg Vikernes in daily life and as a musician and writer.

== Lords of Chaos ==
The 1998 book Lords of Chaos covers the early Norwegian black metal scene. Michael Moynihan, one of the book's authors, was sympathetic with Vikernes and his extremist politics. Moynihan disputed being a Nazi or white supremacist. Vikernes was played by Emory Cohen in the 2018 film adaptation, which he criticized for factual inaccuracies and casting a "fat Jewish actor" in his role.

== Works ==
=== Discography ===
==== As Burzum ====
- 1992 – Burzum (recorded January 1992)
- 1993 – Aske (recorded August 1992)
- 1993 – Det som engang var (recorded April 1992)
- 1994 – Hvis lyset tar oss (recorded September 1992)
- 1996 – Filosofem (recorded March 1993)
- 1997 – Dauði Baldrs (recorded in prison 1994–1995)
- 1999 – Hliðskjálf (recorded in prison 1998)
- 2010 – Belus (recorded in 2009)
- 2011 – Fallen (recorded November 2010)
- 2011 – From the Depths of Darkness (recorded March 2010)
- 2012 – Umskiptar (recorded September 2011)
- 2013 – Sôl austan, Mâni vestan (recorded throughout 2012)
- 2014 – The Ways of Yore (recorded throughout 2013)
- 2020 – Thulêan Mysteries (recorded 2015–2020)
- 2023 – The Reincarnation of Ódinn (non-album single)
- 2024 – The Land of Thulê

==== Other appearances ====
- 1994 – Darkthrone – Transilvanian Hunger (wrote lyrics for four songs)
- 1995 – Darkthrone – Panzerfaust (wrote lyrics for one song)
- 1994 – Mayhem – De Mysteriis Dom Sathanas (performed bass guitar)
- 1993 – Mayhem – Life Eternal (EP, performed bass guitar)
- 1991 – Old Funeral – Devoured Carcass (EP, performed electric guitar)
- 1999 – Old Funeral – Join the Funeral Procession (compilation album, performed electric guitar)
- 1999 – Old Funeral – The Older Ones (compilation album, performed electric guitar)
- 2002 – Old Funeral – Grim Reaping Norway (live album, performed electric guitar)
- 2025 – Hyperborea Rising – Reconquest (AI album by Vikernes)
- 2026 – Hyperborea Rising – The Elf Queen (AI album by Vikernes)
- 2026 – Hyperborea Rising – The Elf Queen's Daughter (AI album by Vikernes)
- 2026 – Hyperborea Rising – Halls of Stone (AI album by Vikernes)

=== Bibliography ===
- 1997 – Vargsmål
- 2000 – Germansk mytologi og verdensanskuelse
- 2001 – Guide to the Norse Gods and Their Names
- 2002 – Irminsûl
- 2011 – Sorcery and Religion in Ancient Scandinavia
- 2015 – Reflections on European Mythology and Polytheism
- 2017 – Paganism Explained, part I: Þrymskviða
- 2017 – Paganism Explained, Part II: Little Red Riding Hood & Jack and the Beanstalk
- 2018 – Paganism Explained, Part III: The Cult of Mithra & Hymiskviða
- 2018 – Paganism Explained, Part IV: Valhöll & Odinn in Yggdrasill
- 2019 – Paganism Explained, Part V: Ásgardr, Vanaheimr & the Nine Worlds of Hel
- 2024 – To Hell and Back Again: Part I: My Black Metal Story
- 2024 – To Hell and Back Again: Part II: My Childhood Story
- 2024 – To Hell and Back Again: Part III: My Prison Story
- 2024 – To Hell and Back Again: Part IV: My Burzum Story
- 2024 – To Hell and Back Again: Part V: My Survival Story
- 2025 – To Hell and Back Again: My Complete Story

=== Filmography ===
- 1998 – Satan rir media (himself)
- 2007 – Metal: A Headbanger's Journey (archive footage)
- 2008 – Pure Fucking Mayhem (archive footage)
- 2009 – Until the Light Takes Us (himself)
- 2013 – ForeBears (himself)
