= Burzum =

Norwegian black metal project

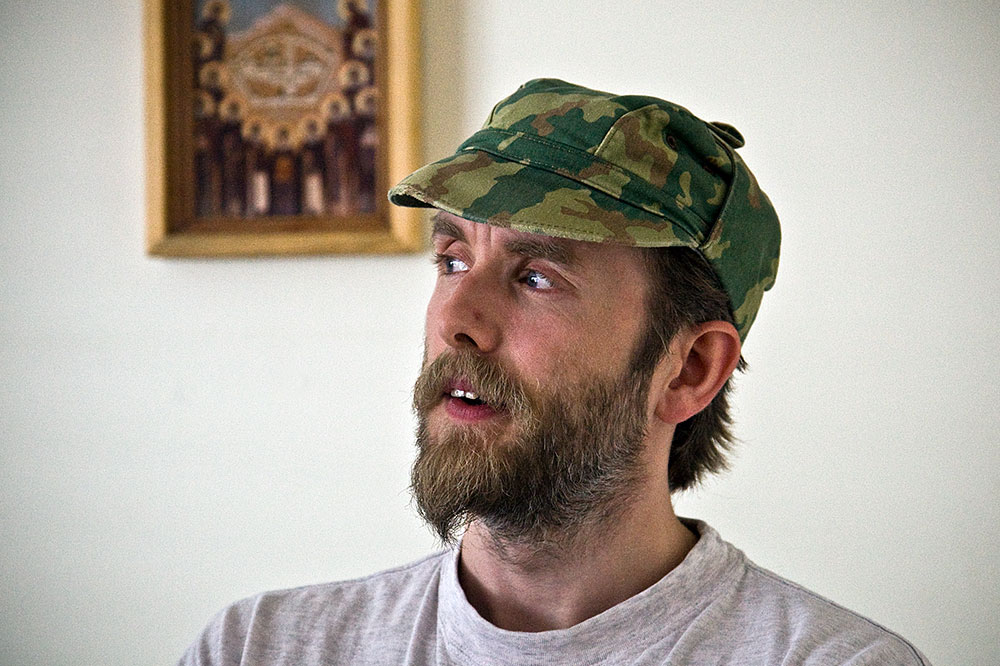
- Burzum founder Varg Vikernes photographed in prison, 2008

Background information
- Origin: Bergen, Norway
- Genres: Black metal; dark ambient; neofolk; neo-medieval music
- Years active: 1991–1999; 2009–2018; 2025–present
- Labels: Deathlike Silence; Cymophane; Misanthropy; Byelobog
- Members: Varg Vikernes
- Website: burzum.org

Burzum (/ˈbɜːrzəm/; Norwegian: [ˈbʉ̀rtsʉm]) is a Norwegian music project founded by Kristian "Varg" Vikernes in 1991. Although Burzum never played live performances, it became a key member of the early Norwegian black metal scene and is considered one of the most influential acts in the history of black metal and its offshoot National Socialist black metal (NSBM). The word "burzum" means "darkness" in the Black Speech, a fictional language crafted by The Lord of the Rings writer J. R. R. Tolkien. Burzum's lyrics and imagery are often inspired by fantasy and Norse mythology.

Vikernes founded Burzum in 1991 and recorded the first four Burzum albums between January 1992 and March 1993. From 1994 to 2009, Vikernes was imprisoned for the murder of Mayhem guitarist Øystein "Euronymous" Aarseth and the arson of three churches. While imprisoned, he recorded two dark ambient albums using only synthesizers, as he had no access to drums, guitar, or bass.

Since his release from prison in 2009, he has recorded several more albums, including those in the dark ambient and neofolk genres. Vikernes ended the Burzum project in 2020 before announcing a new album in 2024.

== History ==
=== Early years (1988–1992) ===
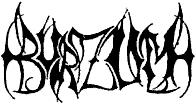
Original Burzum logo used only in 1991

Varg Vikernes began making music in 1988 with the band Kalashnikov. The following year, the name was changed to Uruk-Hai, after the creatures from J. R. R. Tolkien's The Lord of the Rings. In 1990 and 1991, Vikernes played guitar for the death metal band Old Funeral, which also consisted of members who would later form the band Immortal. He appears on the Old Funeral EP Devoured Carcass. Vikernes left Old Funeral in 1991 to concentrate on creating his own musical visions. He had a short-lived project called Satanel, along with Abbath Doom Occulta. He then began a solo project under the name Burzum. The word "burzum" means "darkness" in the Black Speech, a language crafted by Tolkien. Soon after recording two demo tapes, he became part of the Norwegian black metal scene. With his demo tapes, he had attracted attention from Øystein "Euronymous" Aarseth of Mayhem, who had just recently formed Deathlike Silence Productions. Aarseth then signed Burzum to the label, and shortly after, Vikernes―under the pseudonym of Count Grishnackh (another name adapted from The Lord of the Rings)―began to record Burzum's self-titled debut album. According to Vikernes' autobiography on his website, he had intended to record the album in the worst recording quality possible (due to this being a typical trademark of the early Norwegian black metal scene), while still making it sound acceptable. Burzum's eponymous debut album was released in 1992, being the second album released on Deathlike Silence Productions. The song "War" from this album had a guest appearance from Euronymous, playing a guitar solo "just for fun", according to Vikernes.

=== Imprisonment (1993–2009) ===
Burzum logo used between 1994 and 2009

May 1994 saw the release of Hvis lyset tar oss, a new album of previously recorded material from 1992. Burzum remained as a solo project until 1994, when Vikernes was arrested for the murder of Euronymous and the burnings of several churches in Norway. During his time in prison, Vikernes released his next album, titled Filosofem, on 1 January 1996. Recorded in March 1993, Filosofem was the last recording Vikernes made before his imprisonment. Burzum / Aske, a compilation comprising the Burzum album and Aske EP, was released in 1995. While imprisoned, Vikernes managed to record two other albums in a dark ambient style. They were released as Dauði Baldrs (1997) and Hliðskjálf (1999). Both of these albums were created with a synthesizer, as Vikernes was prohibited from using any other instruments in prison.

In 1998, all Burzum albums released up to that point were re-released as vinyl picture discs in a special box set called 1992–1997; however Filosofem did not contain "Rundtgåing av den transcendentale egenhetens støtte" due to its length. The regular vinyl issue of Filosofem on Misanthropy was a double album, containing tracks 1–3 on the A-side, the "Decrepitude" tracks on side 2 and "Rundtgåing av den transcendentale egenhetens støtte" on side 3, with an etched D-side.

=== Post-imprisonment and retirement (2009–2020) ===
Burzum logo used on the 2010 album Belus, set in the typeface Ruritania

Soon after being released, Vikernes started writing new tracks (nine metal tracks and an ambient intro and outro) for an upcoming Burzum album. According to Vikernes' recounts, several record companies were interested in releasing his first album in eleven years. He stated about the new album, "I want to take my time, and make it the way I want it. It will be metal, and the fans can expect genuine Burzum."

The album was going to be originally titled Den hvite guden (The White God).

After a period of inactivity, Vikernes posted a video on his YouTube account in June 2018 announcing that "[he had] moved on [from Burzum]", saying "bye bye" to the project.

In July 2018, a YouTube user named Hermann posted unreleased materials of Uruk-Hai from 1988 to 1990 and Burzum's Bergen prison recordings from 1994, which he received from Tiziana Stupia.

== Musical style and influences ==
Burzum's music includes both straightforward black metal as well as dark ambient, neofolk and neo-medieval music. It is often minimalist and dark, with repetition and simple song structures.

Burzum's lyrics and imagery are often inspired by fantasy and Norse mythology, and do not explicitly feature the far-right political views Vikernes is known for. In a 2010 interview, Vikernes said: "Burzum is not a political or religious band, or even an anti-religious band. Burzum is music; art if you like, and the interpretation of art lies in the eye of the beholder. I might be Nordic, heterosexual and have a Pagan ideology myself, but why would I expect the fans of my music to be just like me?". Burzum is included on Meta's Dangerous Individuals and Organizations list.

Other non-metal artists he has cited as influence include the Cure, Depeche Mode and New Order. In 2011, Vikernes said that he no longer kept up with new black metal bands and listened mostly to the Cure instead.

== Legacy ==
Burzum is widely considered to be one of the most influential acts in the history of black metal and its offshoot National Socialist black metal (NSBM). Bands that have listed Burzum as an influence include Deafheaven, Liturgy, Wolves in the Throne Room and Altar of Plagues. The project has also inspired musicians from other genres, including Chelsea Wolfe, Mount Eerie, Thurston Moore and Vision Eternel.

== Discography ==
Main releases

- Burzum (1992)
- Det som engang var (1993)
- Hvis lyset tar oss (1994)
- Filosofem (1996)
- Dauði Baldrs (1997)
- Hliðskjálf (1999)
- Belus (2010)
- Fallen (2011)
- Umskiptar (2012)
- Sôl austan, Mâni vestan (2013)
- The Ways of Yore (2014)
- Thulêan Mysteries (2020)
- The Land of Thulê (2024)

EPs

- Aske (1993)

Singles

- "Mythic Dawn" (2015)
- "Forgotten Realms" (2015)
- "Thulean Mysteries" (2015)
- "The Reincarnation of Ódinn" (2023)
- "The Magic of the Grave" (2024)
- "The Hidden Name" (2024)
- "The Nature of the Gods" (2024)
- "The Call of the Kraken" (2024)
- "Beyond the Gate" (2024)
- "Winds of the Vanished Realm" (2024)
- "Memories in the Mist" (2024)
- "What Will Come" (2025)
- "Elfland" (2025)
- "Beneath the Barrow" (2025)
- "The Mound of Fire" (2025)

Demos and promos

- Burzum Demo (1991)
- Reh/Demo 91 (1991)
- Burzum Promo (1992)
- Promo Tape (with Uruk-Hai) (1994)

Music videos

- "Dunkelheit" (1996)

Compilation albums

- Burzum / Aske (1995)
- Burzum Anthology (2002) (bootleg)
- Draugen – Rarities (2005) (bootleg, mistakenly featuring an Ildjarn track)
- Burzum Anthology (2008)
- From the Depths of Darkness (2011)
- Foreldra (2019)
- Thulê (2019)
- Unreleased Material 1988–1994 (2021) (Note: On the cassette provided by Tiziana Stupia it was titled The Fighting Uruk-Hai / Wotans Verhängnis.)

Box sets

- Burzum 1992–1997 (1998)
- Burzum 1992–1999 (2010)
- XIII (2018)
- In the Arms of Darkness (2019)

Other appearances

- Presumed Guilty (1998) (contributed "Et hvitt lys over skogen")
- Gummo soundtrack (1998) (contributed "Rundtgåing av den transcendentale egenhetens støtte")
- Fenriz Presents... The Best of Old-School Black Metal (2004) (contributed "Ea, Lord of the Depths")

== See also ==
- List of ambient music artists
