= Misanthropy Records =

Record label

- Founded: 1993
- Founder: Tiziana Stupia
- Defunct: 2000
- Status: Inactive
- Genre: Black metal, avant-garde metal, doom metal, progressive metal
- Country of origin: United Kingdom

Misanthropy Records was a British heavy metal record label.

== History ==
The label was founded in 1993 by Tiziana Stupia, originally solely to release an album by Burzum. The background to the founding of the company was that after Varg Vikernes was arrested in August 1993 for the murder of Mayhem guitarist Øystein Aarseth, no record company wanted anything to do with him. He tried to release Burzum's next album himself, but found that running a worldwide distribution from a prison cell was very difficult. Stupia, a fan of Burzum, was upset when she heard this. She contacted several record companies in an attempt to persuade them to release the album, but to no avail. As a result, one of the companies she wrote to replied to her, stating, "If it is so important to you to have these Burzum albums released, why don't you do it yourself?". Stupia then decided to do just that, and started Misanthropy Records.

A contract with Vikernes was signed, and soon afterwards, Misanthropy's first record was released. The response was so positive that Stupia decided to continue the company. Two more albums by Burzum were released, and then the company started signing other bands, including Fleurety, In the Woods..., and Ved Buens Ende. All releases from Misanthropy Records were within various heavy metal subgenres. Jeff Wagner in Mean Deviation writes that Misanthropy, along with The End Records, helped usher in a new wave of avant-garde metal music.

The company closed down in 2000, as Stupia was tired of the metal scene and wanted to pursue other areas of life, including studying psychology and goddess mythology. She is now called "Srila Devi", works as a yoga teacher and author, and wrote a book entitled Meeting Shiva. Parts of the company's catalogue was licensed to Candlelight.

== Roster ==
- Arcturus
- Beyond Dawn
- Burzum
- Fleurety
- In the Woods...
- Katatonia
- Madder Mortem
- Mayhem
- Monumentum
- Primordial
- Solstice
- Ved Buens Ende
