= Grieg Hall =

Grieghallen
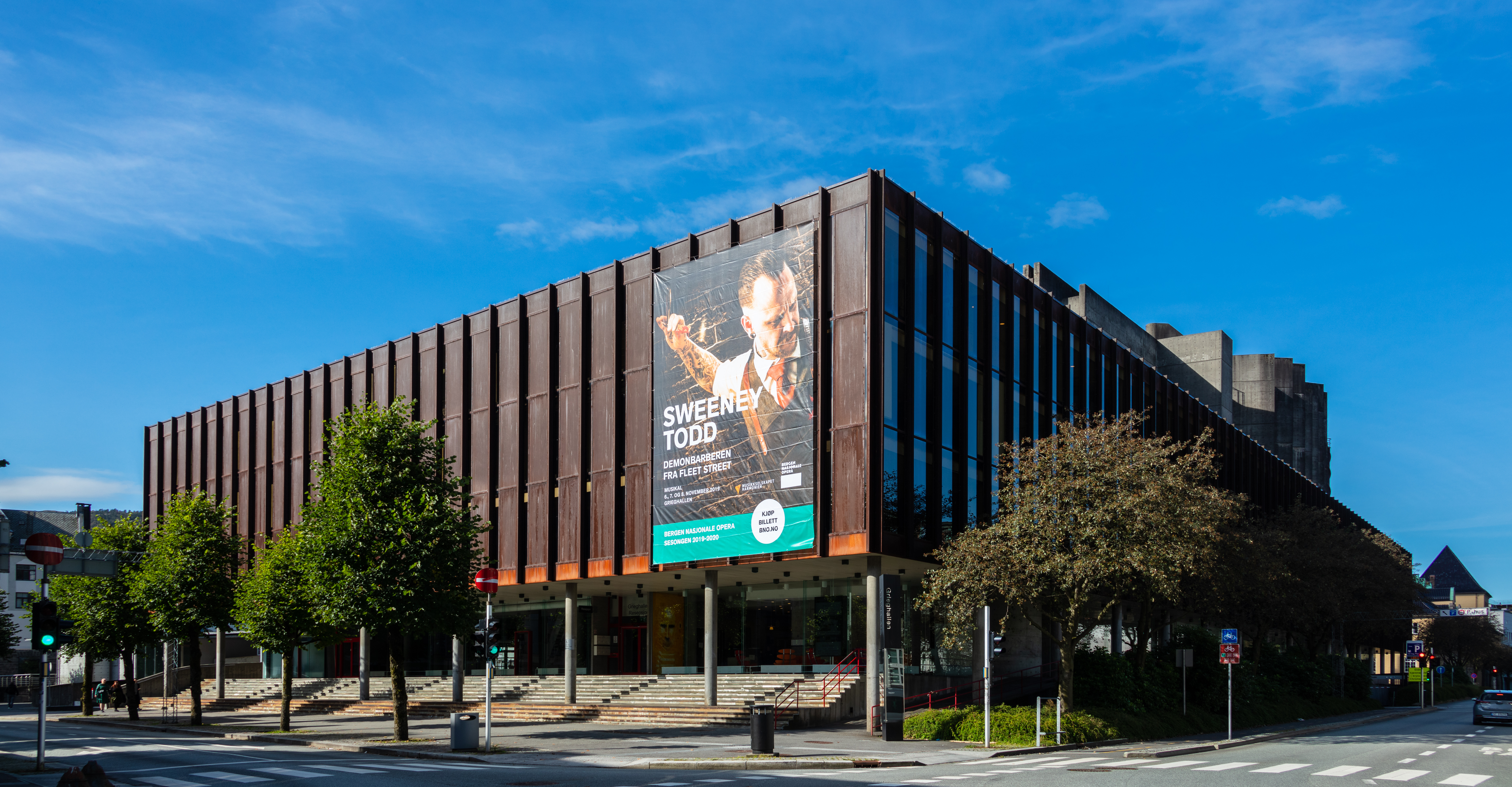
- The concert hall in September 2019
- Interactive map of the Grieghallen area

General information
- Location: Bergen, Norway
- Coordinates: 60°23′19.89″N 5°19′41.57″E
- Construction started: 1967
- Completed: 1978
- Inaugurated: 23 May 1978

Design and construction
- Architect: Knud Munk

Other information
- Seating capacity: 1,500

Grieg Hall (Norwegian: Grieghallen) is a 1,500-seat concert hall located on Edvard Griegs plass (square) in Bergen, Norway.

Grieghallen was named in honor of Bergen-born composer Edvard Grieg, who served as music director of the Bergen Philharmonic Orchestra from 1880 until 1882. It serves as the home of the Bergen Philharmonic Orchestra. The building was designed in a modernist architecture style by the Danish architect Knud Munk. Construction began in 1967 and was finished by May 1978.

== Events ==
Grieghallen is used each year for a series of concerts, ballet and opera performances. The facility has featured symphonic, choir, jazz and pop music. Grieghallen is also a conference and exhibition center. Grieghallen has hosted seminars and lectures as well as national and international congresses.

It hosted the Eurovision Song Contest in 1986, the Eurovision Young Musicians in 2000, and is the host of the annual Norwegian Brass Band Championship competition, which occurs in mid-winter. The recording studio is also known within the black metal community, as several of the more popular Norwegian black metal albums were recorded there, with Eirik Hundvin as sound technician.

== Gallery ==
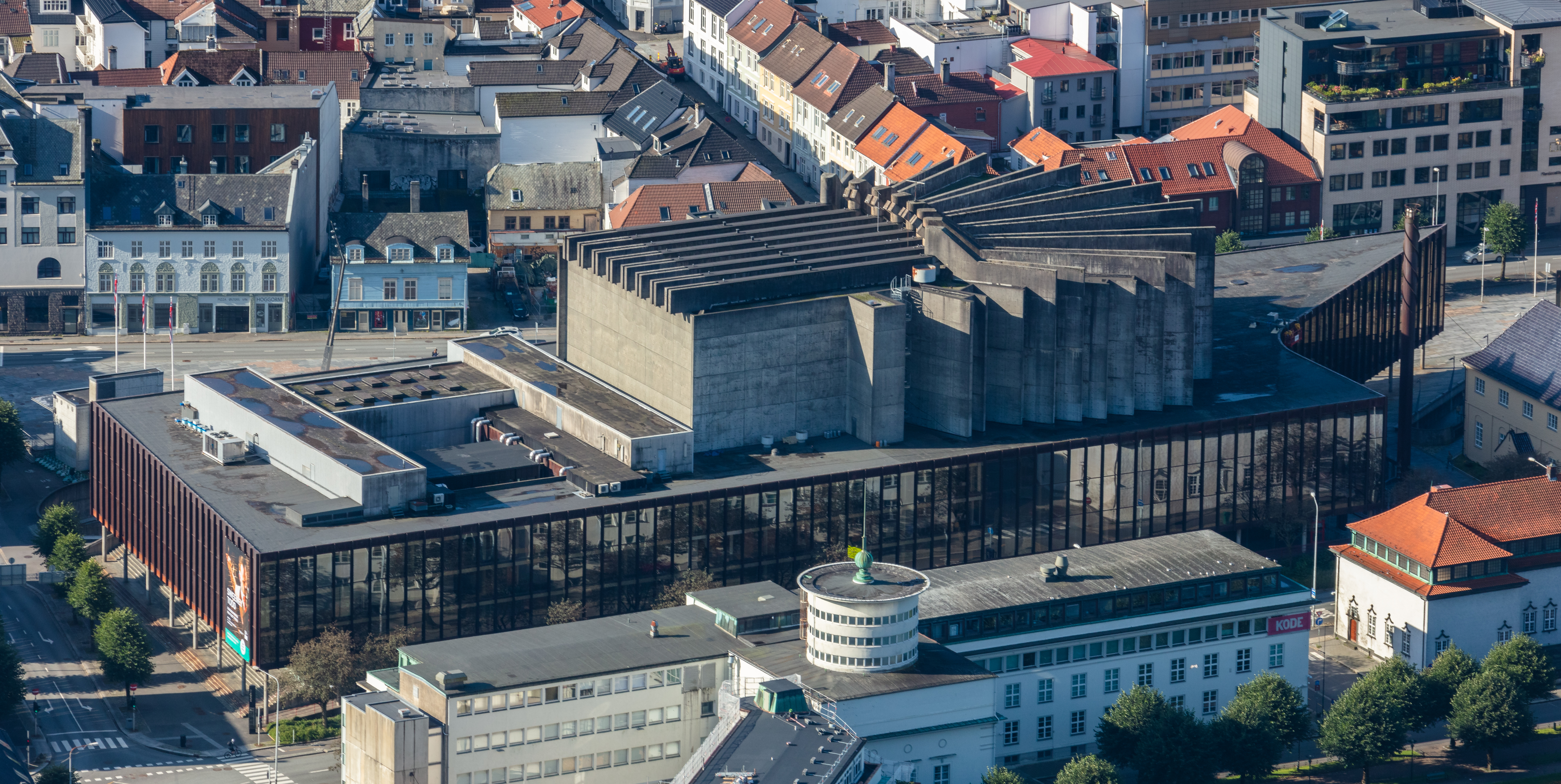
View of Grieghallen from Mount Fløyen

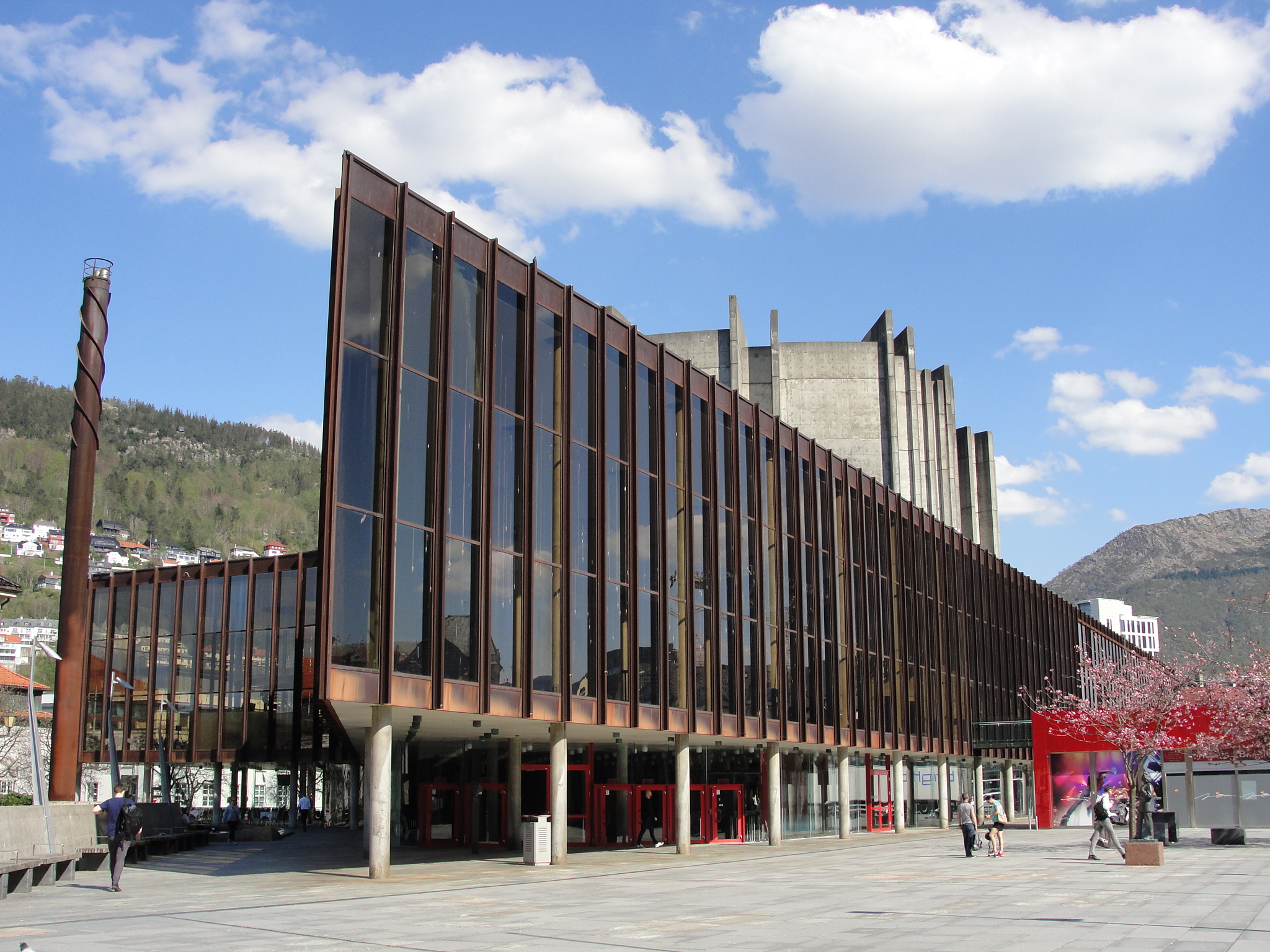

Preceded by Scandinavium; Gothenburg	Eurovision Song Contest; Venue; 1986	Succeeded by Palais du Centenaire; Brussels
