= 2004 in heavy metal music =

This is a timeline documenting the events of heavy metal in the year 2004.

== Newly formed bands ==
- A Dozen Furies
- A Hero A Fake
- Abigail Williams
- Adept
- After The Burial
- Age of Silence
- The Agonist (as The Tempest)
- Ahab
- Alestorm
- Alter Bridge
- Amaseffer
- Amesoeurs
- Architects
- Art of Dying
- Baptized In Blood
- Be'lakor
- Beneath the Massacre
- Beneath the Sky
- Big Business
- Binary Code
- Black Tide
- Black Mountain
- Blackthorn
- Blood Tsunami
- Bloodbound
- Bring Me the Horizon
- Catalepsy
- Celestiial
- Cellador
- Chrome Division
- Claim the Throne
- Coldseed
- Cor Scorpii
- Dark Empire
- Dead Congregation
- Devil Sold His Soul
- Enforcer
- Escape the Fate
- The Faceless
- Finsterforst
- Genghis Tron
- Gnaw Their Tongues
- Havok
- The Human Abstract
- Intronaut
- Kayser
- Lich King
- Massacration
- myGRAIN
- Royal Thunder
- Russian Circles
- Savage Circus
- Saving Abel
- Scale the Summit
- Scar Symmetry
- Skiltron
- Sons of Butcher
- Sturm und Drang
- To-Mera
- Torche
- Tribulation
- Triosphere
- Veil of Maya
- Vreid
- Warbringer
- Wolfmother

== Reformed bands ==
- Extreme (for a few shows)
- Glyder
- Megadeth
- Mötley Crüe

== Albums ==
- 3 Inches of Blood – Advance and Vanquish
- 36 Crazyfists – A Snow Capped Romance
- The Acacia Strain – 3750
- Aerosmith – Honkin' on Bobo
- After Forever – Invisible Circles
- Age of Silence – Acceleration
- Alabama Thunderpussy – Fulton Hill
- All That Remains – This Darkened Heart
- Alter Bridge – One Day Remains
- Amon Amarth – Fate of Norns
- Angra – Temple of Shadows
- Annihilator – All for You
- Anvil – Back to Basics
- Atreyu – The Curse
- Ayreon – The Human Equation
- Behemoth – Demigod
- Beseech – Drama
- Black Label Society – Hangover Music Vol. VI
- Bon Jovi – 100,000,000 Bon Jovi Fans Can't Be Wrong (box set)
- Breaking Benjamin – We Are Not Alone
- Bring Me the Horizon – This Is What the Edge of Your Seat Was Made For
- Cannibal Corpse – The Wretched Spawn
- The Chariot – Everything Is Alive, Everything Is Breathing, Nothing Is Dead, and Nothing Is Bleeding
- Chevelle – This Type of Thinking (Could Do Us In)
- Cradle of Filth – Nymphetamine
- Crossfade – Crossfade
- Damageplan – New Found Power
- Danzig – Circle of Snakes
- Dead Poetic - New Medicines
- Decapitated – The Negation
- Def Leppard – Best of Def Leppard (compilation)
- Deicide – Scars of the Crucifix
- Demon Hunter – Summer of Darkness
- The Dillinger Escape Plan – Miss Machine
- Dio – Master of the Moon
- Dokken – Hell to Pay
- Downset. – Universal
- DragonForce – Sonic Firestorm
- Dream Evil – The Book of Heavy Metal
- Dream Theater – Live at Budokan (live)
- Drowning Pool – Desensitized
- Edguy – Hellfire Club
- Electric Wizard – We Live
- Elis – Dark Clouds in a Perfect Sky
- Enslaved – Isa
- Exodus – Tempo of the Damned
- Fall of the Leafe – Volvere
- Fates Warning – FWX
- Fear Factory – Archetype
- Finntroll – Nattfödd
- God Forbid – Gone Forever
- Grip Inc. – Incorporated
- Gwar – War Party
- Haste the Day - Burning Bridges (Haste the Day album)
- Heaven Shall Burn – Antigone
- Helmet – Size Matters
- Helmet – Unsung: The Best of Helmet (1991–1997) (compilation)
- Hirax – The New Age of Terror
- Hypocrisy – The Arrival
- Iced Earth – The Glorious Burden
- In Flames – Soundtrack to Your Escape
- IRA (MX) - Gesta Heróica
- Isis – Panopticon
- Jag Panzer – Casting the Stones
- Killswitch Engage – The End of Heartache
- Kittie – Until the End
- Kill the Noize – Play with the Devil
- Kronos – Colossal Titan Strife
- Kutless – Sea of Faces
- Lamb of God – Ashes of the Wake
- Lordi – The Monsterican Dream
- Leaves' Eyes – Lovelorn
- Marilyn Manson – Lest We Forget: The Best Of (compilation)
- Marduk – Plague Angel
- Mastodon – Leviathan
- Mayhem – Chimera
- Megadeth – The System Has Failed
- Mercenary – 11 Dreams
- Meshuggah – I
- Metal Church – The Weight of the World
- Metalium – As One – Chapter Four
- Ministry – Houses of the Molé
- Misanthrope – Misanthro-Thérapie (15 Années d'Analyse) (compilation)
- Mnemic – The Audio Injected Soul
- Monster Magnet – Monolithic Baby!
- Motörhead – Inferno
- My Dying Bride – Songs of Darkness, Words of Light
- Necrophagist – Epitaph
- Neurosis – The Eye of Every Storm
- Nightwish – Once
- No-Big-Silence – Kuidas kuningas kuu peale kippus
- Oomph! – Wahrheit oder Pflicht
- Orange Goblin – Thieving from the House of God
- Otep – House of Secrets
- Papa Roach – Getting Away with Murder
- Pentagram – Show 'Em How
- Pig Destroyer – Painter of Dead Girls (compilation)
- Pig Destroyer – Terrifyer
- Power Quest – Neverworld
- Primal Fear – Devil's Ground
- Pro-Pain – Fistful of Hate
- Probot – Probot
- Rammstein – Reise, Reise
- Raunchy – Confusion Bay
- Rhapsody – Symphony of Enchanted Lands II – The Dark Secret
- Rotting Christ – Sanctus Diavolos
- Saxon – Lionheart
- Scars of Tomorrow – Rope Tied to the Trigger
- Scarve – Irradiant
- Scorpions – Unbreakable
- Senses Fail – Let It Enfold You
- Shadows Fall – The War Within
- Slipknot – Vol. 3: (The Subliminal Verses)
- Sonata Arctica – Reckoning Night
- Soulfly – Prophecy
- Static-X – Beneath... Between... Beyond... (compilation)
- Stryper – 7 Weeks: Live in America, 2003 (live)
- Suffocation – Souls to Deny
- Terror – One with the Underdogs
- The Crest – Vain City Chronicles
- The Haunted – Revolver
- Therion – Lemuria
- Therion – Sirius B
- U.D.O. – Thunderball
- Underoath – They're Only Chasing Safety
- Unearth – The Oncoming Storm
- Vader – The Beast
- Van Halen – The Best of Both Worlds (compilation)
- Velvet Revolver – Contraband
- Vintersorg – The Focusing Blur
- Visions of Atlantis – Cast Away
- WarCry – Alea Jacta Est
- Winds – The Imaginary Direction of Time
- Wintersun – Wintersun
- Within Temptation – The Silent Force
- Xandria – Ravenheart

== Bands disbanded ==
- Bathory
- Creed
- Damageplan
- Memento
- Nothingface (reformed in 2005)
- Prayer for Cleansing
- SugarComa
- Windir

== Events ==
- Brian "Head" Welch announced his departure from Korn after converting to Christianity.
- Bassist Tim Gaines announced his departure from Stryper after 10 complete years. He was replaced by Tracy Ferrie.
- Jason Jones was announced as Drowning Pool's new lead singer and joined them on the album Desensitized.
- Supergroup Velvet Revolver releases their debut album Contraband which debuts at No. 1 on the Billboard 200 and goes double platinum.
- After an eight-year hiatus, Extreme briefly returns for a short tour and a few concerts in Japan.
- Van Halen reunites with Sammy Hagar for a summer tour.
- Anal Cunt vocalist Seth Putnam slips into a coma after consuming a large amount of drugs.
- Aerosmith returns to a raw hard rock sound with their blues cover album Honkin' on Bobo
- Terry Balsamo leaves Cold and joins Evanescence as their new guitarist.
- Guitarist Lisa Marx joins Kittie as a session member, replacing Jeff Phillips.
- Maniac leaves Mayhem and is replaced by the band's former singer, Attila Csihar.
- Dave Mustaine reforms Megadeth with 3 session musicians, former and original Megadeth guitarist Chris Poland, bassist Jimmie Lee Sloas and drummer Vinnie Colaiuta to record The System Has Failed, then tour the album with full-time members Glen Drover on guitar, James MacDonough on bass and Shawn Drover on drums.
- Ex-Judas Priest drummer Dave Holland is sentenced to eight years in prison for attempted rape against a then 17-year-old boy.

== Deaths ==
- 14 January – Terje "Valfar" Bakken, founder, vocalist and multi-instrumentalist of Windir, died from hypothermia after being caught in a snow storm. He was 25.
- 3 June – Thomas Börje "Quorthon" Forsberg, founder, vocalist and multi-instrumentalist of Bathory, died from heart failure at the age of 38.
- 17 August – Dennis "D-Roc" Miles, guitarist of Body Count, died from lymphoma complications at the age of 44.
- 20 October – Flowing Tears founding members, former drummer Cristian Zimmer and former guitarist Björn Lorson, died in a car accident.
- 8 December – "Dimebag" Darrell Lance Abbott, founding member and former guitarist of Pantera and guitarist of Damageplan, was killed on stage, along with three other people, while performing with Damageplan at a nightclub in Ohio. He was 38.
- 26 December – Mieszko Andrzej Talarczyk, vocalist and guitarist of Nasum, died in the 2004 Indian Ocean earthquake at the age of 30. His body was identified on 16 February 2005.
- Piero "Sanctis Ghoram" Gori, former Death SS vocalist, died from cancer.

Preceded by 2003	Heavy Metal Timeline; 2004	Succeeded by 2005
