= Prominence and Demise =

Studio album by Winds
- Released: 4 September 2007
- Genres: Progressive metal, neoclassical metal
- Length: 55:24
- Label: The End Records

Winds chronology
The Imaginary Direction of Time (2004)	Prominence and Demise (2007)

Prominence and Demise is the third full-length album by Norwegian progressive metal band Winds, released on 4 September 2007.

== Track listing ==
1. "Universal Creation Array" – 8:20
2. "Distorted Dimensions" – 4:34
3. "The Grand Design" – 6:20
4. "When the Dream of Paradise Died" – 5:10
5. "Fall and Rise" – 7:17
6. "The Darkest Path" – 5:05
7. "Convictions and Contradictions" – 3:39
8. "Where the Cold Winds Blow" – 6:52
9. "The Last Line" – 8:09

== Personnel ==
=== Personnel ===
- Lars E. Si (Age of Silence, ex-Khold, Tulus) – vocals
- Carl August Tidemann (ex-Arcturus) – guitars
- Andy Winter (Age of Silence) – piano, keyboards
- Hellhammer (Age of Silence, Arcturus, ex-The Kovenant, Mayhem) – drums

=== Additional musicians ===
- Agnete M. Kirkevaag – soprano voices (Madder Mortem)
- Lars Nedland – alto voices (Age of Silence, Borknagar, Solefald)
- Dan Swanö – tenor voices, death growls (Edge of Sanity, Nightingale, Second Sky, ex-Bloodbath)
- Øystein Moe – bass (ex. Tritonus, Ulver)

Oslo Philharmonic Orchestra

- Andre Orvik – first violin
- Vegard Johnsen – second violin
- Dorthe Dreier – viola
- Hans Josef Groh – cello
