= The Imaginary Direction of Time =

Studio album by Winds
- Released: 26 July 2004
- Genre: Progressive metal, neoclassical metal
- Length: 48:10
- Label: The End Records

Winds chronology
Reflections of the I (2002)	The Imaginary Direction of Time (2004)	Prominence and Demise (2007)

Professional ratings
Review scores
Source	Rating
Allmusic	3/5 stars
Terrorizer	5.5/10

The Imaginary Direction of Time is the second full-length album by Norwegian progressive metal band Winds. It was released on 26 July 2004. Paul Stenning described the album in Terrorizer as lacking "any real sense of purpose. This seems like a 'concept' and 'avant garde' for the sake of it, turning the album into a mesh of clumsy comparisons and nothing of real worth...it's a none-too-daring experiment caught in the headlights of its own vision".

== Track listing ==
1. "What is Beauty?" – 5:03
2. "Sounds Like Desolation" – 0:35
3. "Theory of Relativity" – 4:47
4. "Visions of Perfection" – 5:18
5. "The Fireworks of Genesis" – 5:39
6. "Under the Stars" – 6:25
7. "A Moment For Reflection" – 5:57
8. "Time Without End" – 4:09
9. "The Final End" – 1:10
10. "Beyond Fate" – 2:52
11. "Silence in Despair" - 4:55
12. "Infinity" - 3:17

== Personnel ==
=== Line up ===
- Eikind (Age of Silence, ex-Khold, Tulus) - Vocals, Bass
- Carl August Tidemann - Guitars
- Andy Winter (Age of Silence) - Piano, keyboards
- Hellhammer (Age of Silence, Arcturus, ex-The Kovenant, Mayhem) - Drums

=== Session Members ===
- Andre Orvik - Violin
- Vegard Johnsen - Violin
- Dorthe Dreier - Viola
- Hans Josef Groh - Cello
