= Krek =

Krek may refer to:

- Krek (film), a 1968 animated film
- Krek (album), a 2005 album by Khold
- Krek (surname), a family name
