= Department of Apocalyptic Affairs =

Studio album by Fleurety
- Released: August 2000
- Recorded: 1998
- Genre: Avant-garde metal, experimental rock, black metal
- Length: 49:57
- Label: Supernal Music
- Producer: Svein Egil Hatlevik, Alexander Nordgaren and Kristoffer Rygg

Fleurety chronology
Last-Minute Lies (1999)	Department of Apocalyptic Affairs (2000)	Min Tid Skal Komme (Reissue) (2003)

Professional ratings
Review scores
Source	Rating
AllMusic	3/5 stars
Chronicles of Chaos	7/10

Department of Apocalyptic Affairs is the second album by the Norwegian avant-garde metal band Fleurety.

== Style ==
The album shows Fleurety moving away from black metal to get into a more avant-garde and experimental sound, adding trip hop, electronic, jazz, death metal, Circus music, industrial, art rock and contemporary classical elements. William York of AllMusic likened the album's sound to that of Mr. Bungle, Portishead and fellow Norwegian acts Ulver and Arcturus.

Fleurety used many guest musicians from the Norwegian music scene, including members (or former members) from Mayhem, Ulver, Head Control System, Borknagar, Arcturus, Winds, Tritonus, Beyond Dawn, Virus, Ved Buens Ende, Aura Noir and Dødheimsgard.

== Track listing ==
1. "Exterminators" – 6:50
2. "Face in a Fever" – 6:16
3. "Shotgun Blast" – 5:20
4. "Fingerprint" – 7:01
5. "Facets 2.0" – 5:14
6. "Last Minute Lies" – 7:54
7. "Barb Wire Smile (Snap Ant Version)" – 6:55
8. "Face in a Fever (Nordgaren Edit)" – 4:27
- Track 8 is unlisted.

== Credits ==
=== Fleurety ===
- Alexander Nordgaren : guitar
- Svein Egil Hatlevik : drums, synthesizer, vocals
- Per Amund Solberg : bass

=== Guest musicians ===
==== Vocals ====
- Karianne Horn (tracks 1, 4)
- Maniac (track 3)
- Heidi Gjermundsen (tracks 5, 7)
- Vilde Lockert (track 6)
- G. Playa (track 6)

==== Lead guitar ====
- Knut Magne Valle (track 1)
- Carl August Tidemann (tracks 2, 4)

==== Drums ====
- Hellhammer (track 1)
- Einar Sjursø (track 2)
- Carl-Michael Eide (track 5)

==== Programming ====
- Tore Ylwizaker (tracks 3, 4, 6)
- James Morgan (track 7)

==== Miscellaneous ====
- Mari Solberg (saxophone on tracks 1, 2, 5, 7)
- Steinar "Sverd" Johnsen (synthesizer on track 2)
