= Carl August Tidemann =

Norwegian guitarist

- Born: 7 June 1971 (age 55)
- Origin: Norway
- Genres: Progressive metal, neoclassical metal
- Occupation: Guitarist
- Member of: Winds, Tritonus
- Formerly of: Arcturus

Carl August Tidemann (born 7 June 1971) is a Norwegian neoclassical metal guitarist, best known for his work in progressive bands like Arcturus and Winds.

== Discography ==
=== Solo ===
1. Stylistic Changes (1996)

=== With Tritonus ===
1. Evolution Demo (1993)
2. Shadowland Demo (1994)
3. A Gathering Of 8 Norwegian Prog Metal Bands Compilation (1997)
4. Prison Of Light (2007)

=== With Arcturus ===
1. Aspera Hiems Symfonia (1995)
2. La Masquerade Infernale (guest) (1997)

=== With Winds ===
1. Of Entity and Mind EP (2001)
2. Reflections of the I (2002)
3. The Imaginary Direction of Time (2004)
4. Prominence and Demise (2007)
5. Into Transgressions of Thought (2015)

=== With Fleurety ===
1. Department of Apocalyptic Affairs (guest) (2000)

=== With Diabla ===
1. Everything Passes (studio session work) (2001)
