= Mørke gravers kammer =

Studio album by Khold
- Released: 20 April 2004
- Recorded: August–October 2003 at Sub Sonic Society Studio, Oslo, Norway
- Genre: Black metal
- Length: 45:41
- Label: Candlelight

Khold chronology
Phantom (2002)	Mørke gravers kammer (2004)	Krek (2005)

Mørke gravers kammer is the third studio album by the Norwegian black metal band Khold. It was released on 20 April 2004, through Candlelight Records.

== Background ==
Mørke gravers kammer was the band's first release on the Candlelight record label, after leaving Moonfog Productions.

== Track listing ==
All lyrics are written by Hildr; all music is composed by Khold

No.	Title	Length
1.	"Åtselgraver"	3:49
2.	"Død"	3:49
3.	"Niflheimr"	2:53
4.	"Hevnerske"	3:58
5.	"Med Nebb Og Klør"	3:37
6.	"Mørke Gravers Kammer"	4:29
7.	"Opera Seria"	3:53
8.	"Sjeleskjender"	4:32
9.	"Vardøger"	3:31
10.	"Kamp"	4:02

Enhanced bonus track
No.	Title	Length
11.	"Død" (video)

== Release ==
A music video was released for the track "Død". It was directed by Marcel Lelienhof, and produced by Andreas Rønning. The video was included as enhanced content for the original CD release.

=== Critical reception ===
Professional ratings
Review scores
Source	Rating
AllMusic	3/5 stars

AllMusic's review was generally favorable, writing, "This CD isn't groundbreaking by 2004 standards [...] Nonetheless, Mørke gravers kammer is an appealing example of the more musical and intricate side of Nordic death metal/black metal."

=== Re-issue ===
Mørke gravers kammer was re-issued on 16 July 2012, by Peaceville Records, featuring a bonus, previously unreleased track from the band's 2000 demo.

== Personnel ==
Khold

- Gard – vocals, guitar
- Rinn – guitar
- Grimd – bass guitar
- Sarke – drums

Additional personnel

- Lars Klokkerhaug – engineering, mixing
- Adrian Wear – sleeve layout and artwork
- Espen Berg – mastering
- Marcel Lelienhof – sleeve photography
