= The Spear of the Lily Is Aureoled =

Studio album by Sculptured
- Released: March 1998
- Genre: Progressive death metal
- Length: 40:26
- Label: The End Records

Sculptured chronology
The Spear of the Lily Is Aureoled (1998)	Apollo Ends (2000)

The Spear of the Lily Is Aureoled is the debut album by the American progressive death metal band Sculptured.

== Track listing ==
All songs written by Don Anderson.

1. "Together with the Seasons" - 5:08
2. "Almond Beauty" - 5:50
3. "Lit by the Light of Morning" - 6:19
4. "Fashioned by Blood & Tears" - 6:18
5. "Fulfillment in Tragedy for Cello & Flute" - 1:00
6. "Her Silence" - 9:06
7. "Our Illuminated Tomb" - 7:25

== Personnel ==
- Don Anderson - guitars, vocals
- Jason William Walton - bass
- Andy Winter - keyboards
- David Murray - drums
- Thomas Walling - lead vocals
