= Reflections of the I =

Studio album by Winds
- Released: September 7, 2002
- Genre: Progressive metal; neoclassical metal
- Length: 38:38
- Label: The End Records
- Producer: Andy Winter

Winds chronology
Of Entity and Mind (2001)	Reflections of the I (2002)	The Imaginary Direction of Time (2004)

Professional ratings
Review scores
Source	Rating
Allmusic	link

Reflections of the I is the first full-length album by Norwegian progressive metal band Winds. It was released on September 7, 2002.

== Track listing ==
No.	Title	Length
0.	"Eerie Untitled Pregap"	9:01
1.	"Clarity"	2:15
2.	"Realization"	4:53
3.	"Of Divine Nature"	4:37
4.	"Transition"	1:16
5.	"Passion's Quest"	4:51
6.	"Reason's Desire"	5:11
7.	"Premonition"	1:59
8.	"Remnants of Beauty"	5:37
9.	"Existence"	3:48
10.	"Continuance""	3:26
11.	"Predominance"	0:45
Total length:		38:38

== Personnel ==
Winds

- Eikind – vocals, bass
- Carl August Tidemann – guitars
- Andy Winter – keyboards, production
- Hellhammer – drums

Additional personnel

- Hans Josef Groh – cello
- Stig Ove Ore – viola
- Vegard Johnsen – violin
- Drajevolitch – backing vocals
- Travis Smith – artwork
- Tom Kvålsvoll – mastering
- Børge Finstad, Winds – mixing
