= Skywards – A Sylphe's Ascension =

Skywards - A Sylphe's Ascension

Studio album by Fragments of Unbecoming
- Released: February 10, 2004
- Recorded: 2003 at Stellwerk Studio
- Genre: Melodic death metal
- Length: 46:55
- Label: Metal Blade Records
- Producer: Stefan "Joe" Hanbuch; Fragments of Unbecoming

Fragments of Unbecoming chronology
Bloodred Tales - Chapter I – The Crimson Season (2002)	Skywards - A Sylphe's Ascension (2004)	Sterling Black Icon - Chapter III - Black But Shining (2006)

Skywards – A Sylphe's Ascension is the second album by the German melodic death metal band, Fragments of Unbecoming. Skywards was the first album released under their new label Metal Blade Records on February 10, 2004. The album artwork is dedicated to Anna-Lena. The European release is sold with an extra cardboard-box and the booklet and inlay are a five-color-print.

== Album quote ==
"The artwork shall be dedicated to Anna-Lena for being the precious lightsource of my inspiration in this turn of the tide..."-Stefan Weimar

== Track list ==
1. "Up From the Blackest of Soil [Ascension Theme]" − 1:25
2. "The Seventh Sunray Enlights My Pathway" − 5:07
3. "Shapes of the Pursuers" − 5:07
4. "Skywards | A Sylphe's Ascension" − 5:37
5. "Mesmerized" − 0:43
6. "Entangled Whispers in the Depth" − 4:49
7. "Scattered to the Four Winds" − 4:09
8. "On a Scar's Edge to Infinity" − 3:57
9. "Lour Pulse" − 1:44
10. "Fear My Hatred" − 3:36
11. "Insane Chaosphere" − 4:41
12. "Life's Last Embers [Farewell Theme]" − 0:38

== Credits ==
=== Band ===
- Stefan Weimar – Death Vocals, Guitar
- Sascha Ehrich – Guitar, Acoustic guitars
- Wolle Schellenberg – Guitar
- Ingo Maier – Drums

=== Production and other ===
- Produced, engineered, mixed and mastered in autumn 2003 by Stefan Hanbuch and Fragments of Unbecoming.
- All lyrics and musical arrangements by Fragments of Unbecoming.
- Band photography by Bernd Siebold.
- Cover artwork "Skywards", booklet design and Fragments of Unbecoming logotype by Sascha Ehrich.
