= Phantom (Khold album) =

Studio album by Khold
- Released: April 15th, 2002
- Recorded: December 2001, January 2002 at Livingroom Studio, Oslo, Norway
- Genre: Black metal
- Length: 33:52
- Label: Moonfog

Khold chronology
Masterpiss of Pain (2001)	Phantom (2002)	Mørke gravers kammer (2004)

Phantom is the second studio album by Norwegian black metal band Khold. It was released on 15 April 2002, through Moonfog Productions. It’s the only album with former Tulus bassist, Sir Graanug (Victor Borge), who replaced Lars Eikind during the recording sessions. Just a few months later, Sir Graanug left the band and joined Grind (Thomas Arnesen).

Professional ratings
Review scores
Source	Rating
The Metal Crypt	4.2/5

== Track listing ==
All lyrics are written by Hildr; all music is composed by Khold

No.	Title	Length
1.	"Dødens Grøde"	3:57
2.	"Skjebnevette"	3:33
3.	"Hekseformular I Vev"	3:01
4.	"Phantom"	4:19
5.	"Fra Grav Til Mørke"	3:09
6.	"Døde Fuglers Sang"	4:02
7.	"Slaktereika"	3:53
8.	"Ord I Flammer"	4:23
9.	"Vandring"	3:33
Total length:		33:52

== Personnel ==
Khold

- Gard – vocals, guitar
- Rinn – guitar
- Sir Graanug – bass guitar
- Sarke – drums

Additional personnel

- Design – Bernt B. Ottem
- Edited By [Sonic Clean Up By] – Sigurd Wongraven, Svein Solberg
- Engineer [Engineered By] – Svein Solberg
- Executive Producer – Moonfog Productions
- Mastered By – Chris Sansom, Moonfog
- Photography By [Photos Taken At Nittedal By] – Lars Eithun
