= Winds (band) =

Norwegian progressive metal band

- Origin: Norway
- Genres: Progressive metal, neoclassical metal, symphonic metal
- Years active: 1998–present
- Label: The End Records
- Members: Lars Eric Si; Carl August Tidemann; Jan Axel von Blomberg; Andy Winter
- Website: winds.ws

Winds is a Norwegian progressive/neoclassical metal band formed in 1998. The music is largely influenced by classical music, with Andy Winter's piano work and Carl August Tidemann's guitar solos often the central focuses. The lyrics are written by Winter, and deal mostly with astral and existentialist philosophy.

== Members ==
=== Current members ===
- Lars Eric Si a.k.a. Eikind (Age of Silence, Before the Dawn, Khold, Tulus) – vocals, bass
- Carl August Tidemann (Arcturus, Tritonus) – guitars
- Jan Axel von Blomberg a.k.a. Hellhammer (Age of Silence, Arcturus, The Kovenant, Mayhem, Dimmu Borgir) – drums
- Andy Winter (Age of Silence, Sculptured, Subterranean Masquerade) – piano

=== Session members ===
==== Of Entity and Mind ====
- Drajevolitch – vocals
- Paul S – Bass, fretless bass
- K. Haugen – electric and acoustic guitars (Age of Silence)

==== Reflections of the I ====
- Drajevolitch – vocals
- Vegard Johnsen – violin
- Stig Ove Ore – viola
- Hans Josef Groh – cello

==== The Imaginary Direction of Time ====
- Andre Orvik – violin
- Vegard Johnsen – violin
- Dorthe Dreier – viola
- Hans Josef Groh – cello

==== Prominence and Demise ====
- Lars Nedland (Solefald, Age of Silence, Borknagar, Ásmegin) – guest appearance, vocals
- Dan Swanö (Nightingale, Edge of Sanity, Bloodbath) – guest appearance, vocals
- Oystein Moe (Tritonus) – guest appearance, bass
- Agnete M. Kirkevaag (Madder Mortem) – guest appearance, vocals
- Andre Orvik – violin
- Vegard Johnsen – violin
- Dorthe Dreier – viola
- Hans Josef Groh – cello

== Discography ==
Release date	Title	Label	Note/s
2001	Of Entity and Mind	Avantgarde Music	EP
2002	Reflections of the I	The End Records	Studio album
2004	The Imaginary Direction of Time	The End Records	Studio album
2007	Prominence and Demise	The End Records	Studio album
