= Fleurety =

Norwegian avant-garde metal band

- Origin: Ytre Enebakk, Norway
- Genres: Avant-garde metal Black metal
- Years active: 1991–present
- Labels: Aesthetic Death; Misanthropy; Supernal; Peaceville
- Members: Alexander Nordgaren; Svein Egil Hatlevik

Fleurety is a Norwegian avant-garde metal band, formed in 1991 by Svein Egil Hatlevik and Alexander Nordgaren.

== History ==
The band released their first demo, Black Snow in 1993, and the 7-inch EP A Darker Shade of Evil in 1994, via Aesthetic Death Records. Both featured traditional Norwegian black metal, although with high-pitched screaming vocals that gave the band a characteristic sound.

Their album Min Tid Skal Komme was released in 1995 on Aesthetic Death Records and Misanthropy Records. This recording featured avant-garde/psychedelic black metal with atonal harmonics, folk music, and female vocals by Norwegian pop singer Marian Aas Hansen.

The 1999 mini-album Last-Minute Lies moved further away from black metal. This recording and the following album were released by Supernal Music.

In 2000, Fleurety released their second album, Department of Apocalyptic Affairs. It showed an eclectic style, spanning metal, jazz and electronica, and featured guest musicians from the Norwegian black and avant garde metal scenes, including Kristoffer Rygg and Tore Ylwizaker from Ulver, Hellhammer and Maniac from Mayhem, Carl-Michael Eide from Aura Noir and Ved Buens Ende, Steinar Sverd Johnsen from Arcturus, and Einar Sjursø from Beyond Dawn.

The Min Tid Skal Komme album was reissued by Candlelight Records in 2003, featuring A Darker Shade of Evil and "Absence", a track recorded for the 1995 Blackend compilation. This album was re-released in 2008 as a double gatefold LP through Aesthetic Death Records, featuring the same material as the CD reissue plus the Black Snow demo.

In October 2009, Fleurety released the 7-inch vinyl EP Ingentes Atque Decorii Vexilliferi Apokalypsis, featuring remakes of the songs "Descent into Darkness", from the 1993 demo Black Snow, and "Absence". "Descent into Darkness" includes Hellhammer and Necrobutcher of Mayhem, and Runhild Gammelsæter of Thorr's Hammer as guests. This was the first of several EPs only available on vinyl and in a limited edition. The second release in the series, Evoco Bestias, was released in December 2010.

In 2013, Fleurety released the EP Et Spiritus Meus Semper Sub Sanguinantibus Stellis Habitatabit. The fourth release in the series, Fragmenta Cuinsvis Aetatis Contemporaneae, was released in 2017.

That year, the band released the compilation Inquietum, featuring all tracks from the 7-inch series.

In October 2017, Fleurety released The White Death via Peaceville Records.

== Discography ==
=== Studio albums ===
- Min Tid Skal Komme (1995)
- Department of Apocalyptic Affairs (2000)
- The White Death (2017)

=== EPs ===
- A Darker Shade of Evil (1994)
- Last-Minute Lies (1999)
- Ingentes Atque Decorii Vexilliferi Apokalypsis (2009)
- Evoco Bestias (2010)
- Et Spiritus Meus Semper Sub Sanguinantibus Stellis Habitabit (2013)
- Fragmenta Cuinsvis Aetatis Contemporaneae (2017)

=== Compilations ===
- Inquietum (2017)

=== Demos ===
- Black Snow (1993)

== Members ==
=== Current members ===
- Svein Egil Hatlevik – drums, synthesizer, vocals
- Alexander Nordgaren – bass, guitar, vocals
