= Den Saakaldte =

Norwegian black metal group

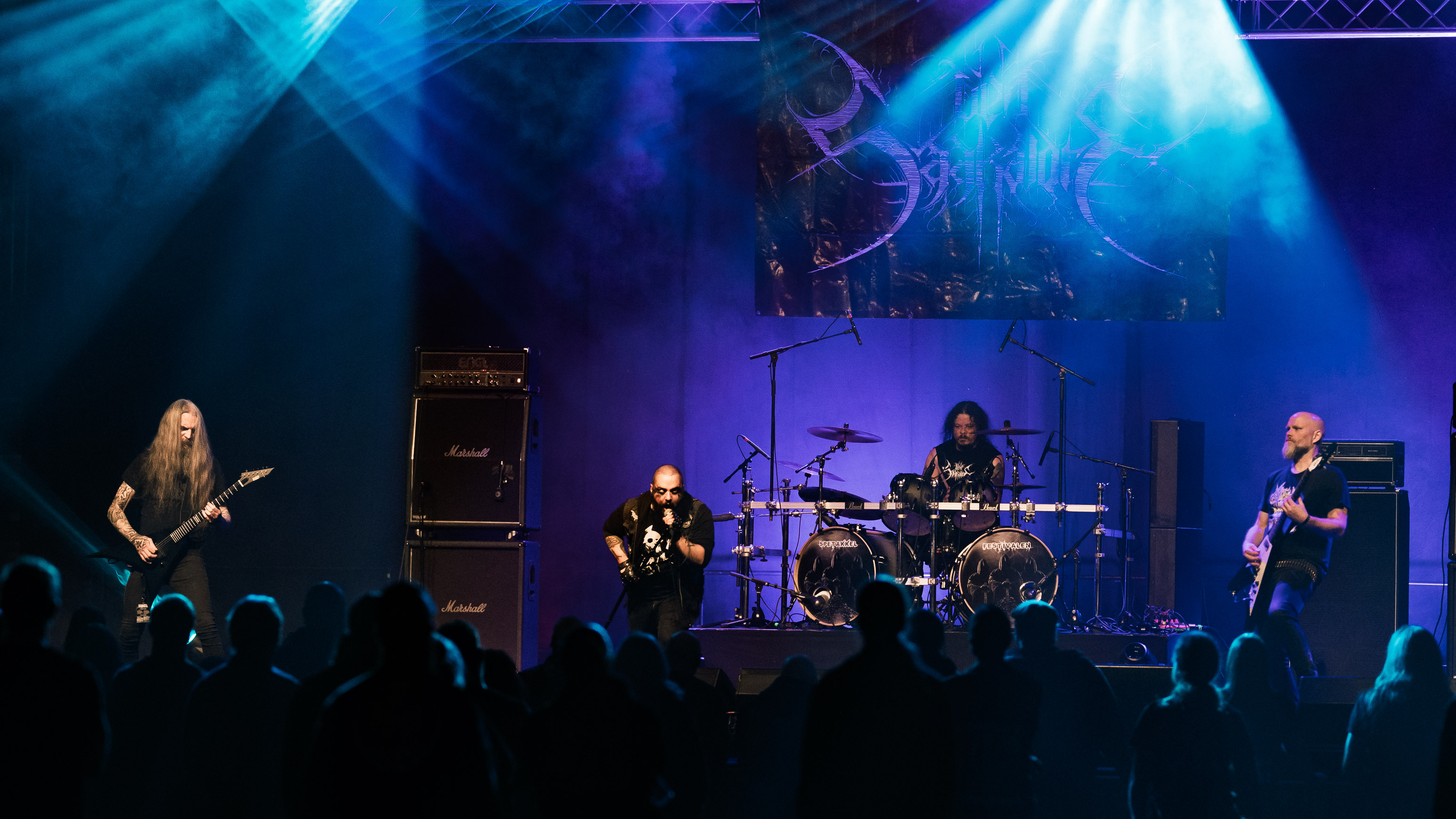
- Den Saakaldte at Spetakkelfestivalen, Larvik, Norway, 2024; Photo: Birgit Fostervold

Background information
- Origin: Oslo, Norway
- Genre: Black metal
- Years active: 2006–present
- Labels: Agonia Records, Pulverised Records, Avantgarde Music
- Members: Simon Peter "Svik" Hovind; Mikael Sykelig; Andrè Kvebek; Vidar Fineidet; Daniel "Tybalt" Theobald
- Past members: Niklas Kvarforth
- Website: www.densaakaldte.com

Den Saakaldte is a Norwegian black metal supergroup, founded in 2006 by Mikael Sykelig and featuring members of Shining, 1349 and Dødheimsgard, among others. It is named after a song by Ved Buens Ende.

== History ==
They played their first concert at Inferno Festival in 2008, headlining the John Dee stage on the second day. Reactions were positive.

Their debut album, Øl, Mørke og Depresjon, released in March 2008 through Eerie Art records, has been described as "a quite unique sounding album," as well as "there's space for aggression and brutality, but also for dark atmospheres and ancient feelings."

The band released their second album, All Hail Pessimism, on February 2, 2009.

On 27 March 2011, Niklas Kvarforth, vocalist and frontman of Den Saakaldte, announced that he would quit the band to focus on Shining.

== Members ==
=== Current ===
- Simon Peter "Svik" Hovind - lead vocals
- Mikael Sykelig - guitar
- Vidar Fineidet - guitar
- Hugh Steven James "Skoll" Mingay - bass
- Daniel "Tybalt" Theobald - drums

=== Former ===
- Niklas Kvarforth - vocals
- Jarle "Uruz" Byberg - drums
- Jan Axel "Hellhammer" Blomberg - drums
- Stian Winter - drums
- Øyvind Hægeland - vocals
- Tor Risdal "Seidemann" Stavenes - bass
- Jormundgand - keyboards, arrangements
- Jan Fredrik "Xarim" Solheim - lead vocals
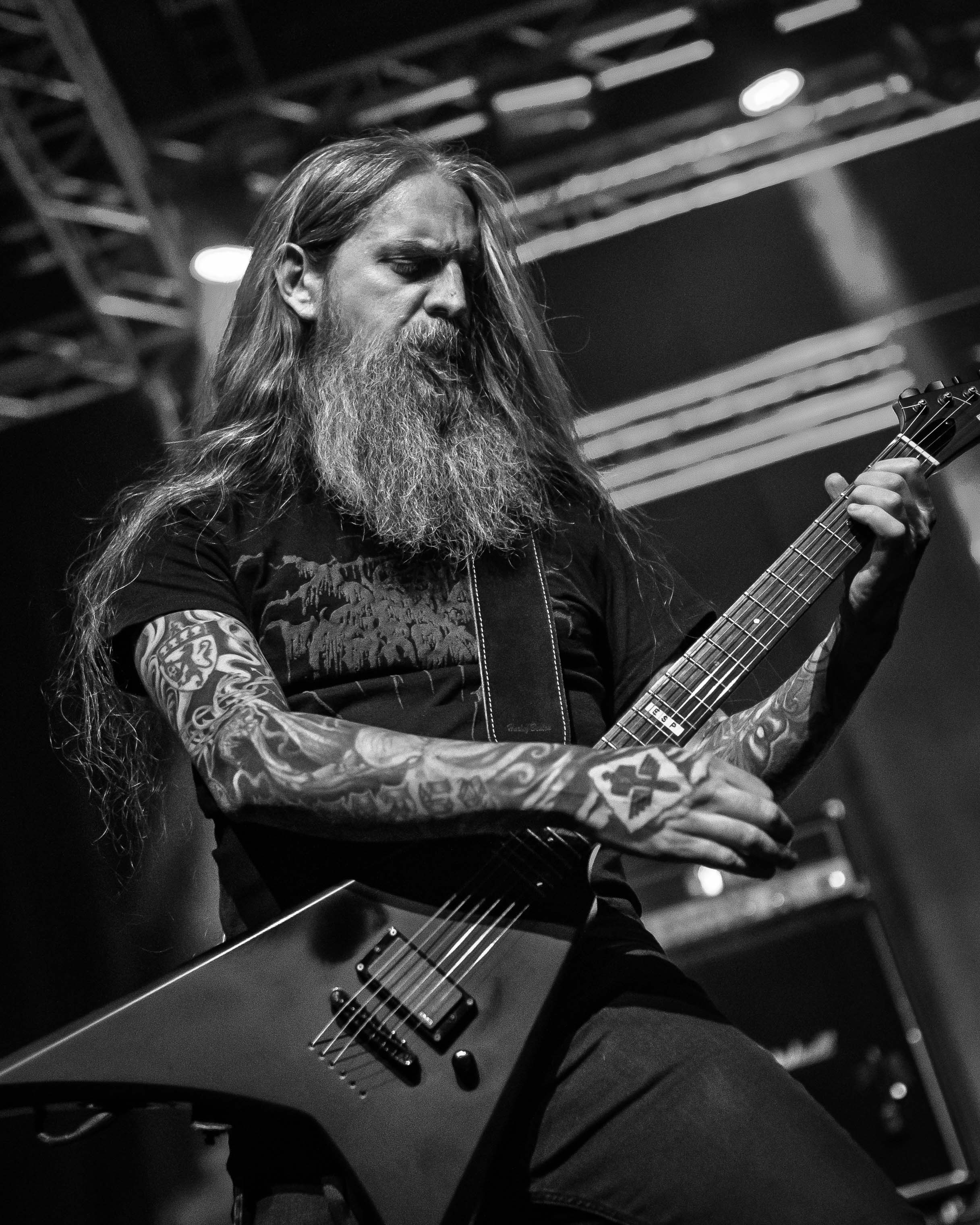
Michael «Sykelig» Siouzios (2024)

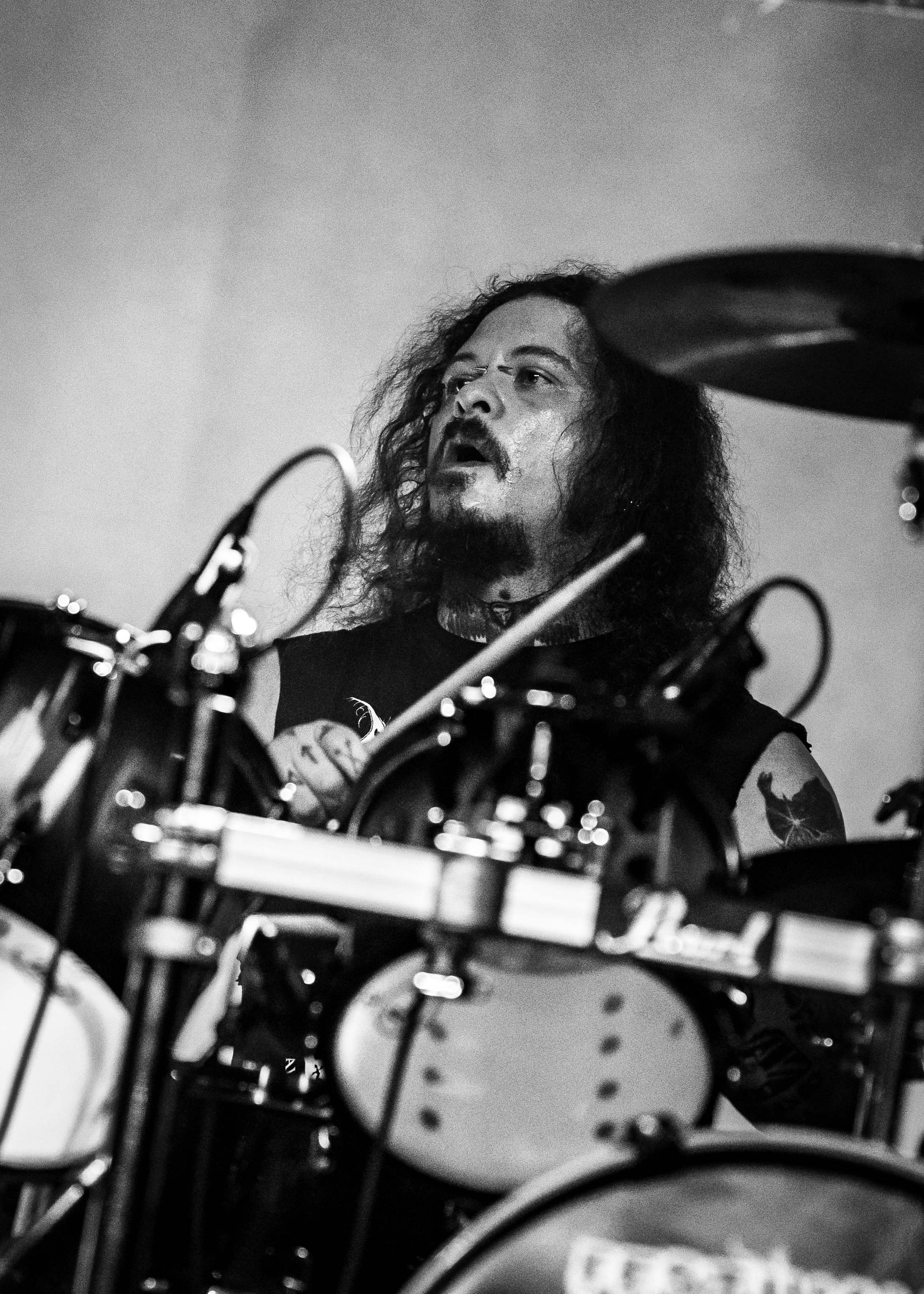
Daniel «Tybalt» Theobald (2024)

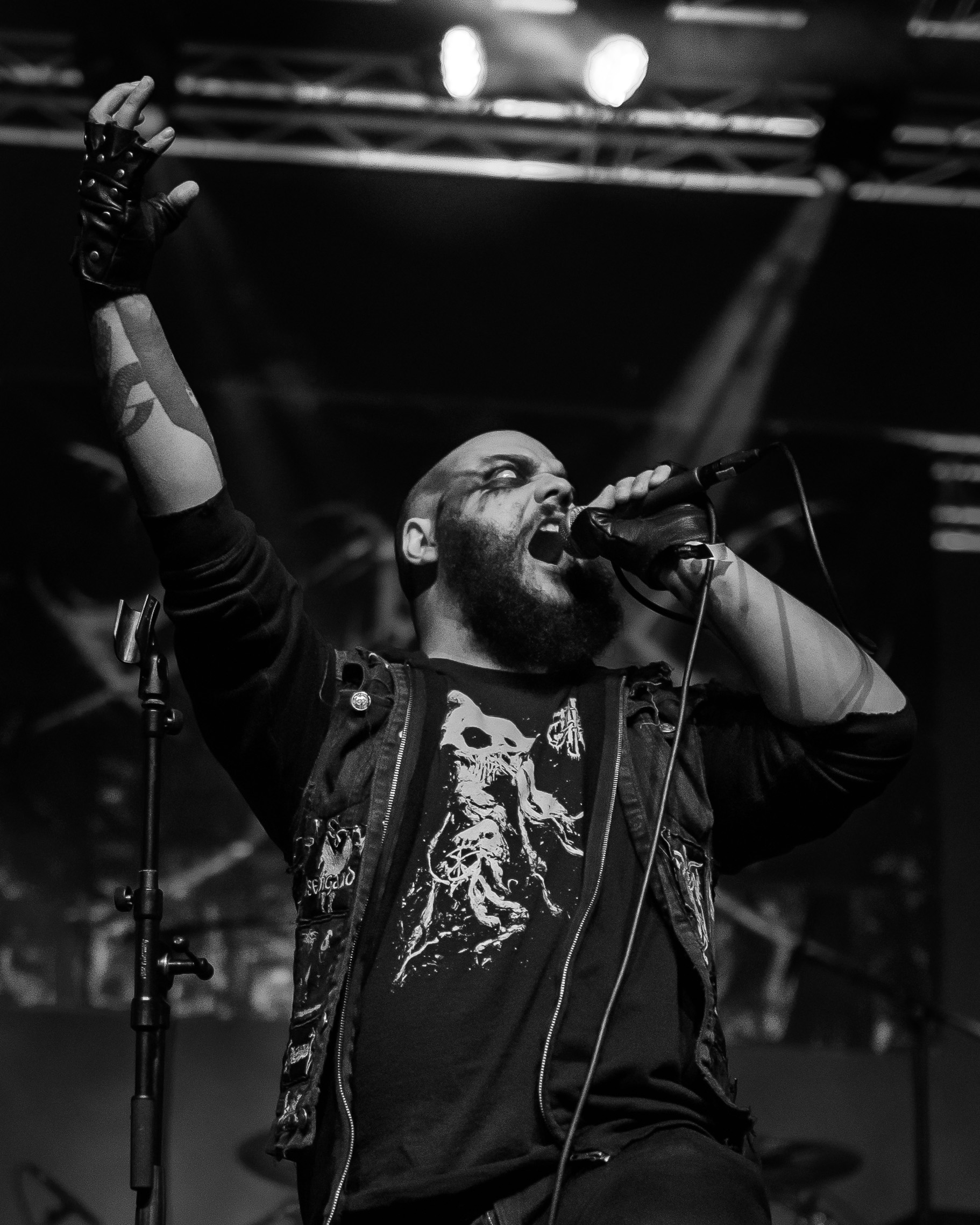
Simon Peter «Svik» Hovind (2024)

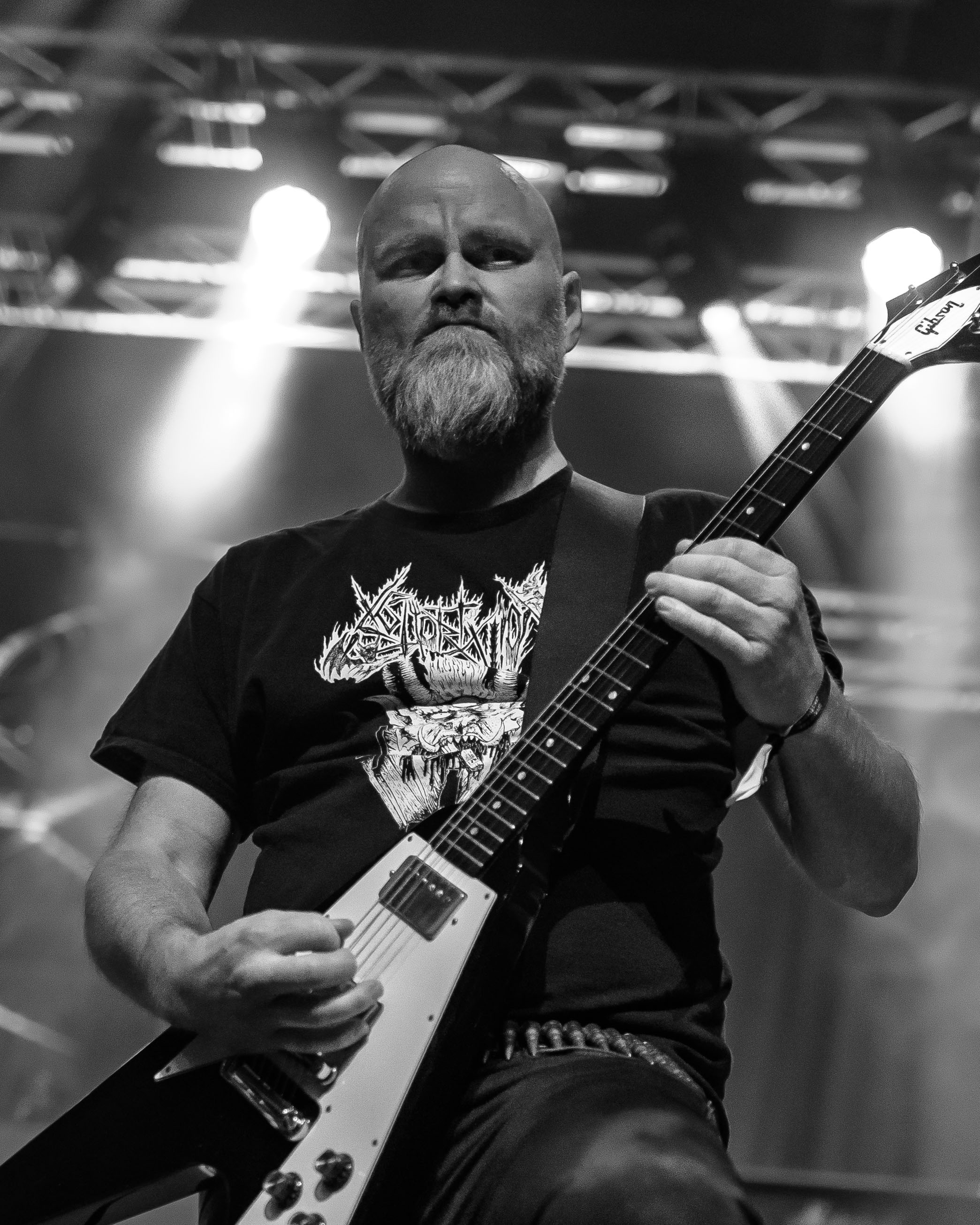
Vidar Fineidet (2024)

== Discography ==
- Øl, mørke og depresjon (2008)
- Die Hard Version (Split With Shining) (2008)
- All Hail Pessimism (2009)
- Faen i helvete (2014)
- Pesten Som Tar Over (2023)
