= Hellhammer (musician) =

Norwegian heavy metal drummer known for his work in black metal

Jan Axel Blomberg
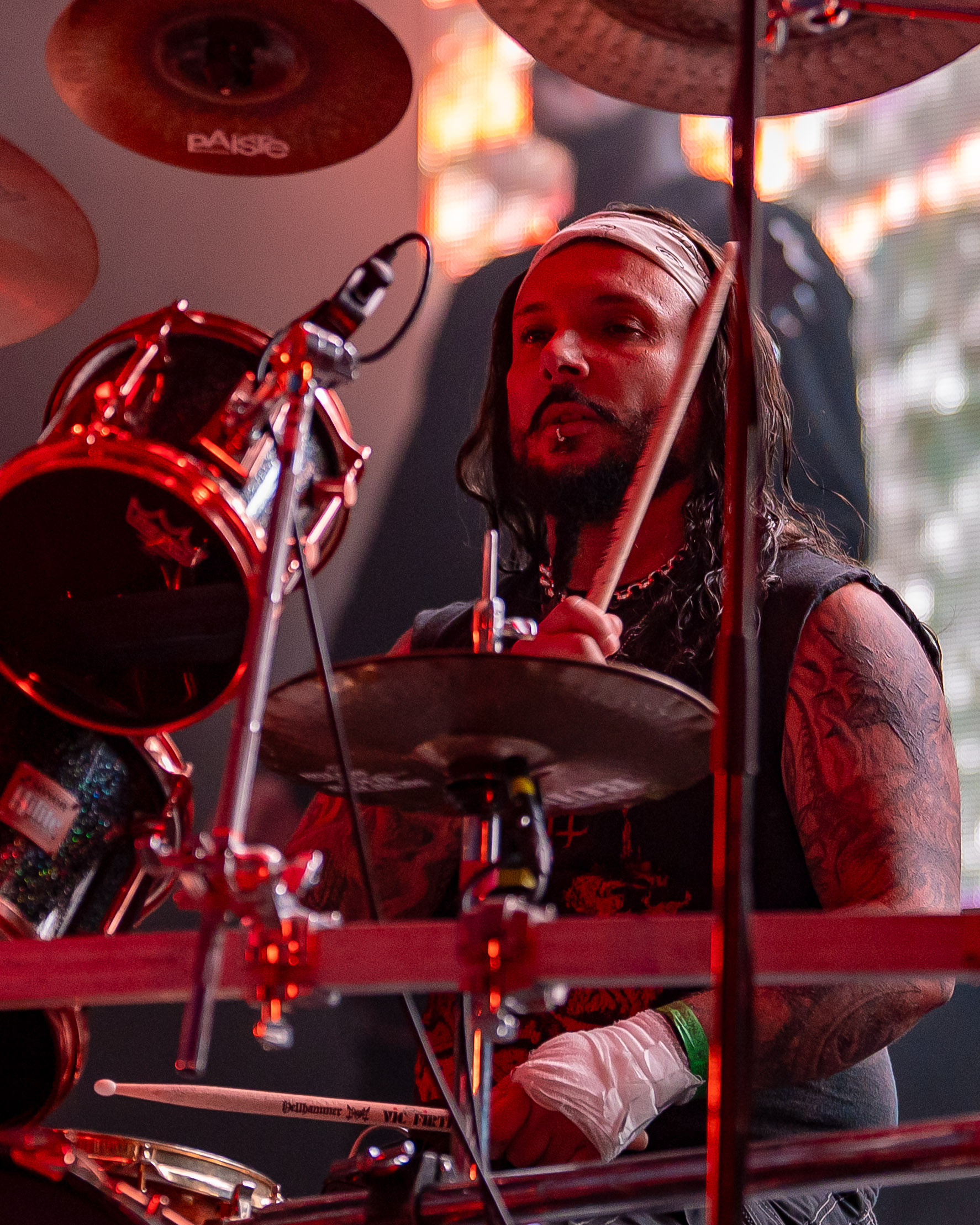
- Hellhammer at Midgardsblot 2025

Background information
- Also known as: Hellhammer
- Born: 2 August 1969 (age 57); Trysil Municipality, Norway
- Genres: Black metal; death metal; symphonic black metal; power metal; heavy metal; unblack metal
- Occupation: Drummer
- Years active: 1987–present
- Member of: Mayhem; The Kovenant; Age of Silence; Arcturus; Mezzerschmitt; Mortem; Winds
- Formerly of: Troll; Den Saakaldte; Shining; Dimmu Borgir

Jan Axel Blomberg (born 2 August 1969), better known by his stage name Hellhammer, is a Norwegian drummer known for his role as the drummer of the black metal band Mayhem, which he joined in 1988. He is the only member to have appeared on all of their studio albums. In 1987, Blomberg, alongside Steinar Sverd Johnsen and Marius Vold, formed the avant-garde black metal band Arcturus (initially under the name Mortem), which disbanded in April 2007 and reunited in 2011. He adopted his stage name in homage to the Swiss extreme metal band Hellhammer. Acclaimed as a talented musician, Blomberg is a three-time recipient of the Spellemannprisen award.

== Early life ==
As a child, Blomberg's primary interests were football and wrestling. Initially, he had no interest in drums or drumming; however, as music became increasingly appealing to him, he began to find different instruments intriguing, which eventually led to an interest in drums. His grandparents purchased his first three drum kits, the first of which was a four-piece jazz kit. He started learning to play the drums by playing along with the albums he listened to. He was influenced by heavy metal bands such as Iron Maiden, Metallica, and Slayer, as well as bands like Depeche Mode and Duran Duran. Eventually, he discovered Venom, Celtic Frost, and jazz, inspired by a previous drum teacher.

== Career ==
Before joining Mayhem, Blomberg played in various local bands, including the progressive metal band Tritonus, where he met Carl August Tidemann, who later became the guitarist for Arcturus and Winds. He also participated in live performances and was then hired by Mayhem, who needed to replace Kjetil Manheim. Blomberg secured the position and adopted the pseudonym Hellhammer.

The first recordings he completed with Mayhem were two songs for a compilation album around 1989, featuring the tracks Carnage and The Freezing Moon. The first full recording he did with Mayhem was Live in Leipzig in 1990. Following that album, Mayhem encountered lineup difficulties due to the suicide of singer Dead, the departure of Necrobutcher, and the murder of bandleader Euronymous by fellow member Varg Vikernes. During this period, he co-founded the band Arcturus with Sverd in 1991, emerging from the remnants of the band Mortem. They released the 7" My Angel in 1991, followed by the mini album Constellation.

In 1995, he joined Immortal as a session drummer during their tour that year, and appeared in their first official video, Grim and Frostbitten Kingdoms. He briefly played for Emperor during this time as well. The recording and release of Arcturus's debut album Aspera Hiems Symfonia also occurred in this year.

In 1997, Jan Axel began collaborating with Covenant, now known as The Kovenant, for the recording of their second album, Nexus Polaris. That album was released in 1998, followed by a European tour. During 1997, Arcturus also released another album, La Masquerade Infernale.

The following year, another album from The Kovenant, Animatronic, was released.

In 2000, he recorded a mini album with his new band Winds, titled Of Entity And Mind, which was released in May 2001. Winds also recorded a full-length album during the spring of 2001, Reflections of the I.

Jan Axel is a two-time Norwegian Grammy Awards winner, having received the award in 1998 for The Kovenant's Nexus Polaris and in 1999 for Animatronic. Both years, they won the prize for Best Hard Rock Album. In addition to these collaborations, Jan Axel has made numerous guest and session musician appearances on various releases.

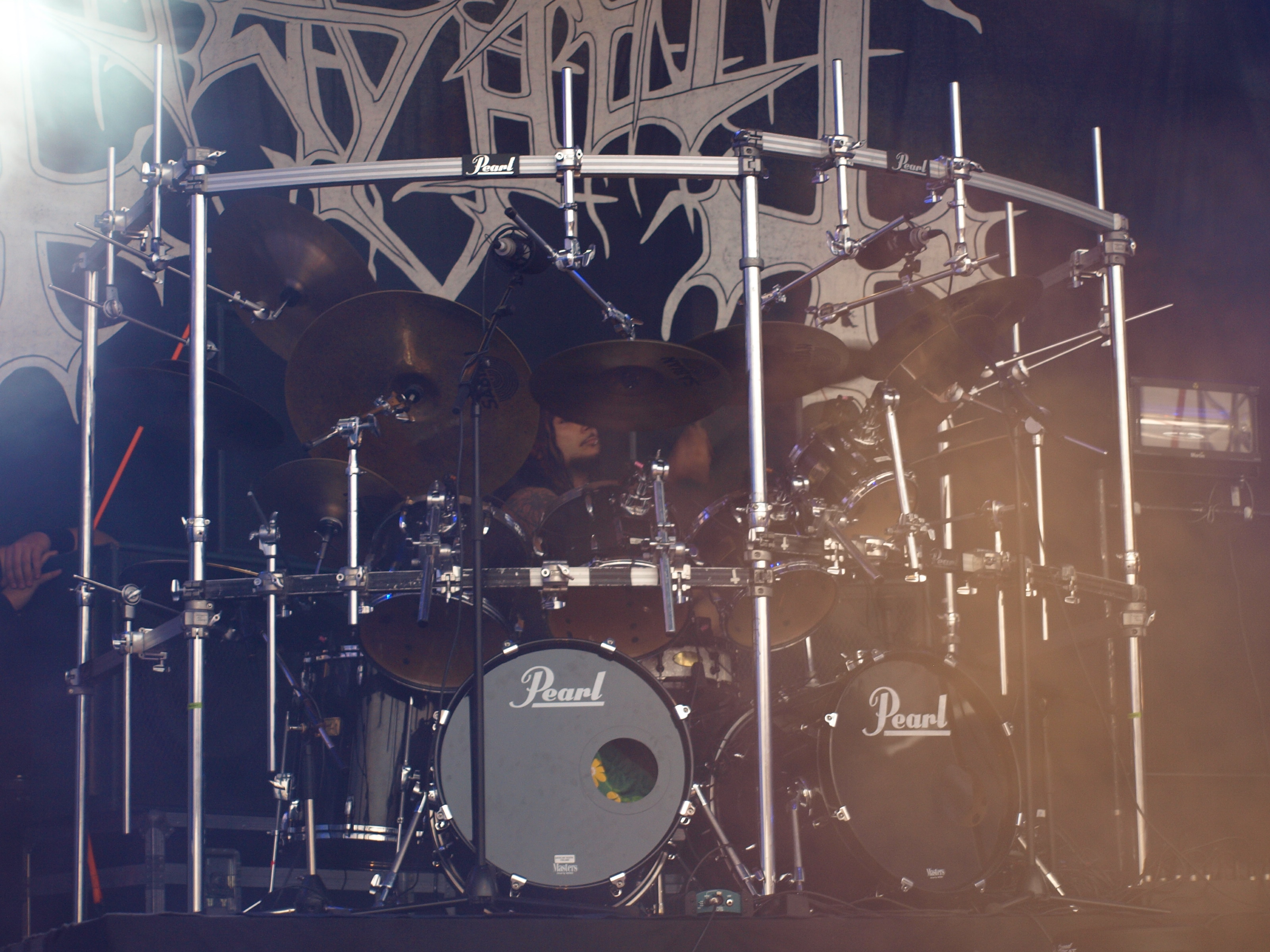
Hellhammer performing in 2008

In 2005, he was interviewed for the black metal mini-documentary included with the 2-disc DVD edition of Metal: A Headbanger's Journey, alongside other Mayhem members Necrobutcher (Jørn Stubberud) and Blasphemer (Rune Eriksen).

In 2009, Hellhammer appeared on Eyes of Noctum's album Inceptum, where he played drums on six tracks. Eyes of Noctum is a black metal band from America featuring Weston Cage, the son of Nicolas Cage, as their lead singer.

Hellhammer collaborated with keyboardist Andy Winter on one of his albums.

In 2010, he played on Nidingr's album Wolf-Father. In 2011, Arcturus reunited, including Hellhammer, and released Arcturian in 2015.

== Beliefs ==
Blomberg joined Mayhem after being introduced by mutual friends and offering his demo tape.

He, however, came to distrust the attitudes he considered "weird":

I came to his house: he was all dressed in black, and there was a knife hanging on his belt. I remember thinking, "What the hell does it mean?" Dead joined the band a few months earlier than I did. He was a Swede and didn't understand a lot of what we were talking about. Well, he was a strange guy. A very reserved person. It was impossible to discuss personal things with him.

— Hellhammer,

Soon after, Blomberg had his first contact with Satanism. Initially, driven by youthful curiosity and having read various books on occultism that described different rituals, Blomberg soon realized that he was entering a dangerous path:

Soon after, we got into everything connected with death, the dark side of life, and Satanism. I always liked those things, despite being born into a Christian family. Only years later did I realize how weird and harmful it was for us. But I was too young to resist my temptation for Darkness. I found some books where various rituals were described. Later on, we applied our knowledge to real life... Euronymous was the most involved. He was our teacher. Now I know he went too far—too far. And Dead followed in his footsteps.

— Hellhammer,

=== Session of Antestor ===
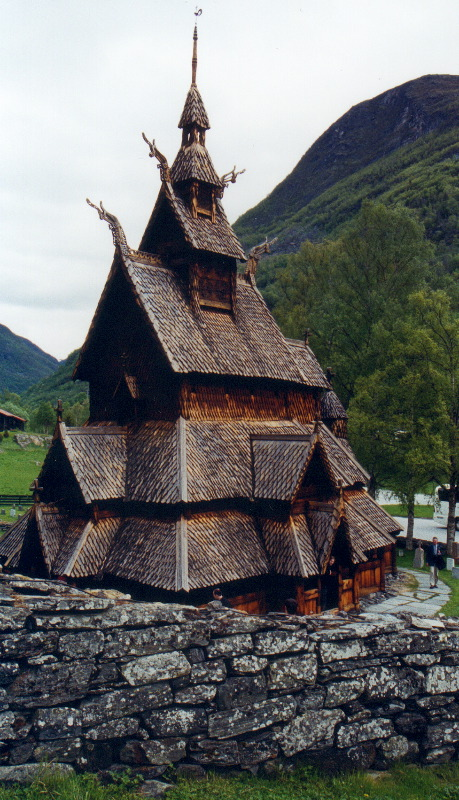
Borgund stave church is depicted in the cover art of the Det tapte liv EP.

Blomberg served as the session drummer for the Christian black metal band Antestor, contributing to the EP Det tapte liv and subsequently to the album The Forsaken, which also featured vocalist Ann-Mari Edvardsen.

Hellhammer's involvement occurred despite the adversarial relationship between Antestor and Mayhem during the former's "Crush Evil" era, characterized by Mayhem's guitarist, Euronymous, attempting to force the band to disband.

Hellhammer's appearance on the recordings elicited a polarized reception within the metal scene. In an interview with the Russian metal site Metal Library on 7 January 2007, Blomberg stated:

To be honest, it [playing for Antestor] was a big 'fuck off!' to them all [Mayhem colleagues and record company]. I will repeat again that I decide what I do and I play not only in black metal groups.

— Jan Axel Blomberg (Hellhammer), Metal Library

The vocalist Ronny Hansen knew Hellhammer personally and invited him to play for the band. The members of Antestor provided Hellhammer with the demos for the songs in person; however, according to Blomberg, he never met the Antestor members in the studio due to producer Børge Finstad's preference for working with each musician individually to achieve better and more productive results. The band also asked Hellhammer to perform live with them, but Blomberg declined. It was not a matter of their beliefs, as Hellhammer explains: "In my opinion, black metal today is just music. I will tell you that neither I nor other members of Mayhem were ever really against religion or anything else. We are primarily interested in music." Additionally, Hellhammer stated that no member of the new lineup was a Satanist, and that the "Satanic stuff […] isn't what I feel Mayhem is about today. […] Mayhem's music is still dark, but I wouldn't say that it's Satanic." Antestor vocalist Ronny Hansen remarked on Blomberg's contribution:

First of all, Jan Axel "Hellhammer" is a total professional. He started up together with the secular scene and worse (laughs), but he doesn't care if it's secular or Christian. He knew from the start what Antestor stands for. And maybe if we get the chance, we are more than willing to use him again. Because his drumming is outstanding. I think that he is the very best drummer in the scene, and we are just very lucky to have borrowed his brilliance.

— Ronny Hansen (Vrede), Jesus Metal

== Drums/techniques ==
=== Equipment (2012) ===
- Sonor Drums: Black Nickel Hardware – White Marine Pearl (Outer), Blue Stratawood (Inner)
- Bass Drums: 20x20 – Remo Powerstroke 3 – Medium Maple
- Snare Drum: 13x4.25 – Remo Coated Ambassador – Heavy Beech – Pearl Masterworks Snare, Pearl CZX Snare
- Toms: 8x10, 10x12, 12x13, 13x14, 16x18 – Thin Maple (Remo Smooth white Emperor)
- Cymbals: Paiste Rude (some custom-made)
- Pedals: Axis A Short-boards – Variable Drive: Lowest – Springs: Highest
- Sticks: Vic Firth Rock Nylon tip

=== Techniques ===
- Hands: French grip with the Moeller method.

== Discography ==
=== As a member ===
==== Mortem ====
- Slow Death (Demo) – (1989)
- Ravnsvart – (2019)

==== Arcturus ====
- Promo 90 (Demo) – (1990)
- My Angel (EP) – (1991)
- Constellation MCD/MLP – (1994)
- Aspera Hiems Symfonia – (1996)
- Constellation – (1997)
- La Masquerade Infernale – (1997)
- Disguised Masters – (1999)
- Aspera Hiems Symfonia/Constellation/My Angel re-release – (2001)
- The Sham Mirrors – (2002)
- Sideshow Symphonies – (2005)
- Shipwrecked in Oslo – (2006)
- Arcturian – (2015)

==== Mayhem ====
- Live in Leipzig – (1993)
- De Mysteriis Dom Sathanas – (1994)
- Out from the Dark – (1996)
- Wolf's Lair Abyss – (1997)
- Ancient Skin / Necrolust – (1997)
- Mediolanum Capta Est – (1999)
- Necrolust / Total Warfare (Split with Zyklon-B) – (1999)
- Grand Declaration of War – (2000)
- Live in Marseille 2000 – (2001)
- European Legions – (2001)
- U.S. Legions – (2001)
- The Studio Experience (Box Set) – (2002)
- Freezing Moon/Jihad (Split with Meads of Asphodel) – (2002)
- Legions of War – (2003)
- Chimera – (2004)
- Ordo Ad Chao – (2007)
- Esoteric Warfare – (2014)
- Daemon – (2019)
- Liturgy of Death - (2026)

==== Covenant/The Kovenant ====
- Nexus Polaris – (1998)
- Animatronic – (1999)
- SETI – (2003)

==== Troll ====
- The Last Predators – (2000)
- Universal – (2001)

==== Winds ====
- Of Entity and Mind – (2001)
- Reflections of the I – (2001)
- The Imaginary Direction of Time – (2004)
- Prominence and Demise – (2007)
- Into Transgressions of Thought – (2015)

==== Mezzerschmitt ====
- Weltherrschaft – (2002)

==== Shining ====
- Angst, Självdestruktivitetens Emissarie – (2002)
- Dolorian/Shining – (2004)
- Through Years of Oppression – (2004)
- The Darkroom Sessions – (2004)
- The Eerie Cold – (2005)

==== Age of Silence ====
- Acceleration – (2004)
- Complications - Trilogy of Intricacy – (2005)

==== Dimmu Borgir ====
- Stormblåst MMV – (2005)
- In Sorte Diaboli – (2007)

==== Carnivora ====
- Judas – (2004)

==== Umoral ====
- 7" Umoral EP – (2007)

==== Nidingr ====
- Wolf-Father – (2010)

=== As a session musician ===
==== Tritonus ====
- Live drummer

==== Emperor ====
- Live drummer – (1992)
- Moon over Kara-Shehr – on the compilation Nordic Metal: A Tribute to Euronymous – (1995)

==== Immortal ====
- Live drummer, Sons of Northern Darkness Tour Part II – (1995)
- Grim and Frostbitten Kingdoms music video – on the Masters of Nebulah Frost video cassette – (1995)

==== Jørn ====
- Worldchanger – (2001)
- The Gathering (Best of) – (2007)

==== Thorns ====
- Thorns – (2001)

==== Vidsyn ====
- On Frostbitten Path Beneath demo – (2004)
- On Frostbitten Path Beneath – (2004)

==== Antestor ====
- Det Tapte Liv – (2004)
- The Forsaken – (2005)

==== Endezzma ====
- Alone (EP) – (2007)

==== Suchthaus ====
- The Dark Side and the Bright Side – (2011)

==== Andy Winter ====
- Incomprehensible – (2013)

==== Dynasty of Darkness ====
- Empire of Pain – (2014)

==== Circle of Chaos ====
- Crossing The Line – (2014)

=== As a guest ===
==== Ulver ====
- Synen – on the compilation Souvenirs from Hell – (1997)

==== Fleurety ====
- Department of Apocalyptic Affairs (track 1) – (2000)

==== Eyes of Noctum ====
- Inceptum (tracks 2, 3, 4, 8, 10, 11) – (2009)

==== Lord Impaler ====
- Admire the Cosmos Black (all tracks) – (2011)

| Preceded by Manheim | Drummer for Mayhem since 1988 | Incumbent |
| New title | Drummer for Arcturus; 1987–2007, 2011–present | Incumbent |
| Preceded by Samoth | Drummer for Emperor Touring; 1992 | Succeeded by Faust |
| Preceded by Grim | Drummer for Immortal Touring; 1995–1996 | Succeeded by Horgh |
| Preceded by Faust | Drummer for Thorns Session; 1998–2000 | Succeeded by Kenneth Kapstad |
| New title | Drummer for Winds since 1998 | Incumbent |
| Preceded by Nagash | Drummer for The Kovenant; 1998–2003 | Succeeded by Küth |
| Preceded by Nagash | Drummer for Troll; 2000–2001 | Succeeded by Ygg |
| New title | Drummer for Mezzerschmitt since 2000 | Incumbent |
| Preceded by John Macaluso | Drummer for Jørn Session; 2001 | Succeeded by Stian Kristoffersen |
| Preceded by Impaler | Drummer for Shining; 2001–2004 | Succeeded by Ludvig Witt |
| Preceded by Armoth | Drummer for Antestor Session; 2004–2005 | Vacant |
| New title | Drummer for Age of Silence since 2004 | Incumbent |
| Preceded by Tony Laureano | Drummer for Dimmu Borgir; 2005–2007 | Succeeded by Tony Laureano |
| New title | Dynasty of Darkness; 2009–present | Incumbent |
