= Sterling Black Icon – Chapter III – Black but Shining =

Sterling Black Icon - Chapter III - Black But Shining

Studio album by Fragments of Unbecoming
- Released: March 24, 2006
- Recorded: Sept/Oct/Nov 2005 at Iguana, Sound Tunnel and PMT Studios
- Genre: Melodic death metal
- Length: 50:30
- Label: Metal Blade Records
- Producer: Christoph Brandes; Fragments of Unbecoming

Fragments of Unbecoming chronology
Skywards - A Slyphe’s Ascension (2004)	Sterling Black Icon - Chapter III - Black But Shining (2006)	Everhaunting Past - Chapter IV - A Splendid Retrospection (2008)

Sterling Black Icon - Chapter III - Black But Shining is the third full-length album by the German melodic death metal band, Fragments of Unbecoming. The European release edition for Sterling Black Icon comes with an "extra noble" cardboard-box.

== Track listing ==
1. "Carmine Preface ~{Entrance}~" − 0:52
2. "Sterling Black Icon" − 5:14
3. "Weave Their Barren Path" − 4:08
4. "Dear Floating Water" − 7:11
5. "Breathe in the Black to See" − 7:21
6. "Ride for a Fall" − 0:44
7. "A Faint Illumination" − 5:49
8. "Live for This Moment, Stay 'Til the End" − 5:59
9. "Scythe of Scarecrow" − 4:49
10. "Onward to the Finger of God" − 1:37
11. "Stand the Tempest" − 4:12
12. "Chambre Noire ~{Departure}~" − 2:30 (translated as Dark Room in French)

== Personnel ==
=== Band ===
- Sam Anetzberger - Lead Death Vocals
- Stefan Weimar - Backing Death Vocals, Guitar
- Sascha Ehrich - Guitar, Acoustic guitar
- Wolle Schellenberg - Bass
- Ingo Maier - Drums

=== Production and other ===
- The drums were recorded in PMT Studios by Tikk. Watchful assistance and engineering by Christoph Brandes.
- All guitars, bass guitars and vocals were recorded and engineered in Sound Tunnel Studios by Ingo Maier.
- Mixed and mastered by Christoph Brandes at the Iguana Studios.
- Produced by Fragments of Unbecoming and Christoph Brandes.
- All lyrics and musical arrangements by Fragments of Unbecoming, except "Chambre Noire" by Marcel Schiborr.
- Final infinite scream on "A Faint Illumination" by Todd "Brave" Collins.
- Band photography by Bernd Siebold.
- Digital band picture make-up by "Groundfrost"
- Artwork was done in cooperation by Niklas Sundin and Sascha Ehrich.
- Layout and design by Sascha Ehrich.
- "Fragments Of Unbecoming" logotype by Sascha Ehrich, courtesy of "Precious Art".
