= Embodiment: Collapsing Under the Weight of God =

Studio album by Sculptured
- Released: February 19, 2008
- Genre: Progressive death metal, avant-garde metal
- Length: 39:19
- Label: The End Records

Sculptured chronology
Apollo Ends (2000)	Embodiment: Collapsing Under the Weight of God (2008)

Embodiment: Collapsing Under the Weight of God is the third studio album by the band Sculptured. The cover artwork is designed by John Haughm; he used images borrowed with permission from the National Library of Medicine. Haughm also designed the layout for the booklet using similar imagery and the photography of Veleda Thorsson. The album also contains samples of speech from the 1981 film Possession in "Taking My Body Apart", and from the 2000 short film Camera in "Embodiment is the Purest Form of Horror".

== Track listing ==
1. "Taking My Body Apart" – 8:31
2. "The Shape of Rage" – 6:04
3. "A Moment of Uncertainty" – 6:31
4. "Bodies Without Organs" – 7:37
5. "Embodiment is the Purest Form of Horror" – 10:36

== Personnel ==
- Don Anderson - guitars, vocals
- Jason William Walton - bass
- Andy Winter - keyboards
- David Murray - drums
- Thomas Walling - lead vocals
