= Øl, mørke og depresjon =

Studio album by Den Saakaldte
- Released: April 14, 2008
- Studio: Scythe Lab Studios
- Genre: Black metal
- Length: 35:07
- Label: Eerie Art

Den Saakaldte chronology
| Øl, mørke og depresjon (2008) | All Hail Pessimism (2009) |

Øl, mørke og depresjon (Beer, Darkness and Depression) is the first album by Norwegian black metal supergroup Den Saakaldte, released on April 14, 2008 by Eerie Art Records.

== Track listing ==
| No. | Title | Length |
|---|---|---|
| 1. | "Gjenspeilingen av knuste minner" | 4:02 |
| 2. | "Drikke ens skål" | 7:29 |
| 3. | "Vandringen" | 7:28 |
| 4. | "Øde" | 3:31 |
| 5. | "Jag ar den fallna" | 11:48 |
| 6. | "Den sørgløse latterens sang" | 0:49 |
