= Bloodred Tales – Chapter I – The Crimson Season =

EP (MCD) by Fragments of Unbecoming
- Released: May 2002
- Recorded: 2000–2001 at Stellwerk Studio
- Genre: Melodic death metal
- Length: 22:15
- Label: Sylphony Creations
- Producer: Stefan "Joe" Hanbuch; Fragments of Unbecoming

Fragments of Unbecoming chronology
Bloodred Tales – Chapter I – The Crimson Season (2002)	Skywards - A Slyphe’s Ascension (2004)

Bloodred Tales – Chapter I – The Crimson Season is an EP by the German melodic death metal band, Fragments of Unbecoming released by the band's own label in May, 2002. The limited release edition is sold with an extra cardboard-box, three postcards and the promotion flyer. The entire booklet and inlay are a 5-colour-print/iso-scale plus additional silver.

== Track listing ==
1. "Invocation of Senses (Intro)" − 0:35
2. "Fragments of Unbecoming" − 3:29
3. "Reborn" − 4:02
4. "Summer Solstice" − 2:10
5. "Bloodred Tales" − 2:15
6. "An Arctic Serenade" − 5:44
7. "Opening My Heaven's Gate" (Outro) − 3:55

== Credits ==
=== Band ===
- Stefan Weimar - Death Vocals, Guitar
- Sascha Ehrich - Guitar, Acoustic guitars
- Wolle Schellenberg - Bass
- Ingo Maier - Drums

=== Production and other ===
- All music composed by Fragments of Unbecoming in a period from 2000 - 2001.
- All songs arranged by Fragments of Unbecoming in 2002.
- Lyrics by Stefan Weimar and Sascha Ehrich.
- Engineered by Fragments of Unbecoming and Stefan Hahnbuch.
- Mixed and mastered at Studio Stellwerk and Fragments of Unbecoming.
- Produced by Fragments of Unbecoming, co-produced by Stefan Hahnbuch.
- Band photos by A. Maier.
- Cover artwork "The Crimson Season" and booklet design by Sascha Ehrich.
- Fragments of Unbecoming logotype and Sylphony Creations logotype by Sascha Ehrich.
