= Fragments of Unbecoming =

German melodic death metal band

- Origin: Laudenbach, Germany
- Genre: Melodic death metal
- Years active: 2000−present
- Labels: Sylphony Creations, Metal Blade, Cyclone Empire, Apostasy Records
- Members: Sam Anetzberger; Stefan Weimar; Sascha Ehrich; Tobias Blach; Christopher Körtgen
- Past members: Wolfram Schellenberg; Ingo Maier
- Website: www.fragmentsofunbecoming.com

Fragments of Unbecoming is a melodic death metal band from Laudenbach, Germany. The band's guitarist, Sascha Ehrich, is a renowned artist in the metal world. He has designed album covers for bands such as Necrophagist. The band's name was taken from the lyrics for the Edge of Sanity song "Darkday".

== Band members ==
=== Current line up ===
- Sam Anetzberger − vocals (2004−present)
- Stefan Weimar − rhythm guitar, backing vocals (2000−present)
- Sascha Ehrich − lead guitar, acoustic guitar (2000−present)
- Tobias Blach − drums (2018−present)
- Christopher Körtgen - bass guitar (2009−present)

=== Former members ===
- Wolfram Schellenberg − bass guitar (2000−2009)
- Ingo Maier − drums (2000−2018)

== Guest appearances ==
- Todd Douglas Collins (Lord Gloom of Afterlight) − Infinite Scream on "A Faint Illumination"

== Discography ==
- Bloodred Tales – Chapter I – The Crimson Season (EP, Sylphony Creations, 2002)
- Skywards – A Sylphe's Ascension (full-length, Metal Blade, 2004)
- Sterling Black Icon – Chapter III – Black but Shining (full-length, Metal Blade, 2006)
- Everhaunting Past Chapter IV - A Splendid Retrospection (full-length, Cyclone Empire, 2009)
- The Art of Coming Apart (full-length, 2012)
- Perdition Portal - Chapter VI (full-length, 2018)
- Dawnbringer – Chapter VII / The Amber Emperor (full-length, Apostasy Records, 2025)
