= Evil 1999 =

Studio album by Tulus
- Released: 1999
- Genre: Black metal
- Length: 34:58
- Label: Hammerheart

Tulus chronology
Mysterion (1998)	Evil 1999 (1999)	Biography Obscene (2007)

Professional ratings
Review scores
Source	Rating
Chronicles of Chaos	9.5/10

Evil 1999 is the third studio album by Norwegian black metal band Tulus. It was released in 1999, through Hammerheart Records.

== Track listing ==
All lyrics are written by Hildr

No.	Title	Length
1.	"Menneskefar"	2:59
2.	"Tarantulus"	4:44
3.	"Draug"	3:01
4.	"Cyprianus"	3:23
5.	"Dokkemaker"	3:02
6.	"Salme"	5:55
7.	"Blodstrup"	2:14
8.	"Sjel"	3:17
9.	"Dårskap til Visdom"	2:37
10.	"Kviteheim"	3:46
Total length:		34:58

== Personnel ==
=== Tulus ===
- Blodstrup – vocals and guitar
- Sir Graanug – bass guitar
- Sarke – drums

=== Miscellaneous staff ===
- Neseblod – engineering and mixing
