= Age of Silence =

Norwegian avant-garde progressive metal band

- Origin: Oslo, Norway
- Genres: Progressive metal Avant-garde metal
- Years active: 2004–present
- Labels: The End Records
- Members: Lars Are Nedland; Jan Axel von Blomberg; BP M. Kirkevaag; Andy Winter
- Past members: Eikind; Extant; Kobbergaard

Age of Silence is a Norwegian avant-garde progressive metal band formed in 2004 by Andy Winter of Winds.

Exclaim! noted about the band's debut studio album, Acceleration, "As might be anticipated from the members' backgrounds, Acceleration's lyrical matter pursues a somewhat surreal philosophical course in its study of modern life, words and music achieving an uncanny synthesis of atmosphere."

== Discography ==
=== Full-lengths ===
- Acceleration (The End Records) (2004)

=== EPs ===
- Complications - Trilogy of Intricacy (The End Records) (2005)

== Band members ==
=== Current members ===
- Lars Are Nedland (Solefald, Borknagar, Ásmegin, Carpathian Forest) - vocals
- Jan Axel von Blomberg (Arcturus, Dimmu Borgir, The Kovenant, Mayhem, Shining, Winds) - drums
- BP M. Kirkevaag (Madder Mortem) - guitars
- Andy Winter (Winds, Sculptured, Subterranean Masquerade) - keyboards

=== Former members ===
- Lars Eric Si (Winds, Before the Dawn, Khold, Tulus) - bass, backing/extreme vocals
- Joacim Solheim - guitars
- Helge Haugen - guitars
