= Complications – Trilogy of Intricacy =

Complications - Trilogy of Intricacy

EP by Age of Silence
- Released: October 15, 2005
- Recorded: 2005
- Genre: Avant-garde metal, progressive metal
- Length: 16:02
- Label: The End Records
- Producer: Andy Winter

Age of Silence chronology
Acceleration (2004)	Complications - Trilogy of Intricacy (2005)

Complications – Trilogy of Intricacy is an EP by the Norwegian avant-garde progressive metal band Age of Silence. It was released on October 15, 2005. The concept of the album revolves around the opening of a shopping mall in hell.

== Track listing ==
1. "The Idea of Independence and the Reason Why it's Austere" – 6:24
2. "Mr. M, Man of Muzak" – 4:09
3. "Vouchers, Coupons and the End of a Shopping Session" – 5:29

== Line-Up ==
- Lars Are "Lazare" Nedland – vocals
- Jan Axel "Hellhammer" Blomberg – drums
- Lars "Eikind" Si – bass, backing vocals
- Joacim "Extant" Solheim – guitar
- Helge "Kobbergaard" Haugen – guitar
- Andy Winter – keyboards
