= Andy Winter (musician) =

- Also known as: Winter
- Origin: Norway
- Genres: Progressive metal, melodic death metal, neoclassical metal, avant-garde metal, classical music
- Occupation(s): Musician, composer
- Instrument: Keyboard
- Labels: The End Records
- Member of: Winds, Age of Silence, Sculptured
- Formerly of: Subterranean Masquerade

Andy Winter is a Norwegian keyboardist that is a founding member of the Norwegian bands Winds and Age of Silence and is part of the American bands Sculptured and formerly Subterranean Masquerade.

Andy Winter has a yet-unnamed musical project in the works, of which drummer and bandmate in Winds and Age of Silence Jan Axel Blomberg recorded for in 2007.

== Discography ==
=== With Winds ===
- Of Entity and Mind (EP, 2001)
- Reflections of the I (full-length, 2002)
- The Imaginary Direction of Time (full-length, 2004)
- Prominence and Demise (full-length, 2007)

=== With Age of Silence ===
- Acceleration (full-length, 2004)
- Complications - Trilogy of Intricacy (EP, 2005)

=== With Sculptured ===
- Embodiment: Collapsing Under the Weight of God (full-length, 2008)

=== With Subterranean Masquerade ===
- Temporary Psychotic State (EP, 2004)

=== Solo ===
- Shades of Light Through Black and White (EP, 2005)
- Incomprehensible (full-length, 2013)
