= Masterpiss of Pain =

Studio album by Khold
- Released: 11 December 2001
- Recorded: January–February 2001 at Panser Studios, Oslo, Norway
- Genre: Black metal
- Length: 34:41
- Label: Moonfog
- Producer: Khold

Khold chronology
Masterpiss of Pain (2001)	Phantom (2002)

Professional ratings
Review scores
Source	Rating
Chronicles of Chaos	6.5/10

Masterpiss of Pain is the debut studio album of the Norwegian black metal band Khold. It was recorded in the early part of 2001 and released in December of that year, through Moonfog Productions, the record label run by Satyricon leader Sigurd Wongraven (Satyr).

== Track listing ==
All lyrics are written by Hilde "Hildr" Nymoen; all music is composed by Khold (Sverre "Gard" Stokland, Geir "Rinn" Kildahl, Lars Eikind, Thomas "Sarke" Berglie).

No.	Title	Length
1.	"Nattpyre"	3:59
2.	"Den Store Allianse"	3:41
3.	"Norne"	2:41
4.	"Svart Hellingdom"	3:25
5.	"Rovnatt"	2:44
6.	"Kaldbleke Hender"	3:14
7.	"Bortvandring"	5:00
8.	"Mesterverk Av Smerte"	3:27
9.	"Jol"	2:33
10.	"Oyne I Arv"	3:42

== Personnel ==
=== Khold ===
- Sverre "Gard" Stokland – vocals, guitar
- Geir "Rinn" Kildahl – guitar
- Lars Eikind – bass guitar
- Thomas "Sarke" Berglie – drums, percussion

=== Additional personnel ===
- Galder – guitar on "Rovnatt"
