= Krek (surname) =

Krek is a surname. Notable people with the surname include:

- Janez Evangelist Krek (1865–1917), Slovene politician
- Miha Krek (1897–1969), Slovene politician
- Uroš Krek (1922–2008), Slovene composer
