= Binary Code (band) =

US musical group

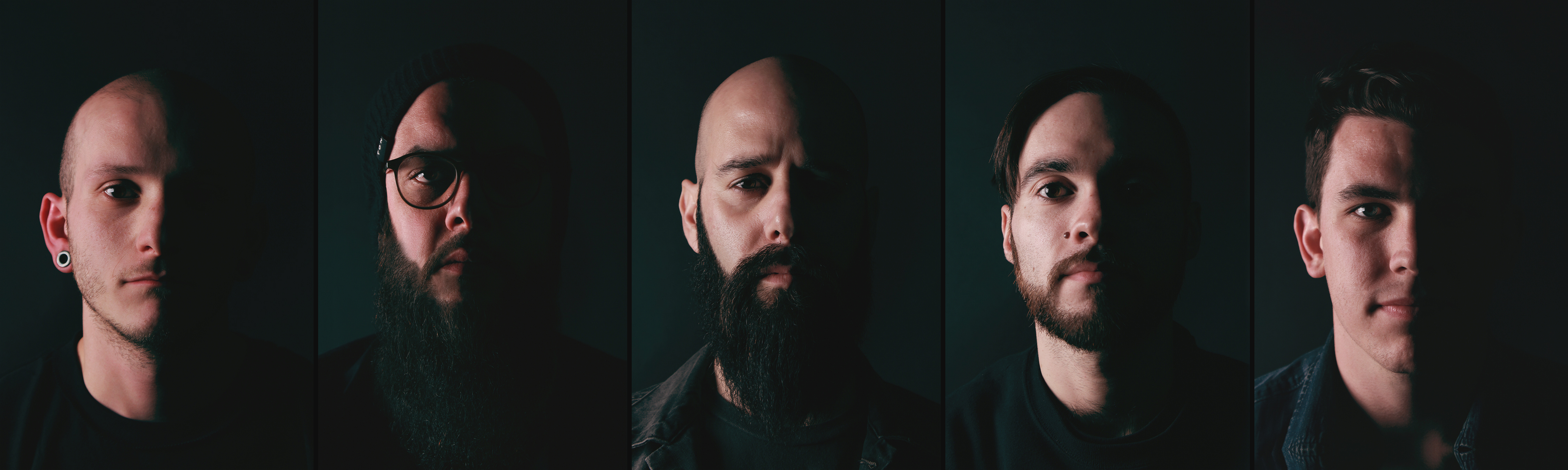
- Binary Code in 2016

Background information
- Origin: New Jersey / Brooklyn, NY
- Genres: Progressive Metal
- Years active: 2004–present
- Label: None
- Members: Jesse Zuretti; Oded Weinstock; Connor Appleton; Austin Blau; PJ Spilletti
- Website: www.facebook.com/binarycodemusic

Binary Code is an American progressive metal band formed in Bergen County, New Jersey in 2004 by founding member Jesse Zuretti.

In 2009, the band teamed up with MetalSucks.net to release their debut full-length "Suspension of Disbelief". The album was well-received by several metal and rock magazines, as well as many metal websites. After their tour with Revocation in 2010, the band wrote an EP which they self-recorded (engineered by Paul Cutri and guitarist Jesse Zuretti) entitled "Priest". This EP was similarly well received.

In 2016, Binary Code independently released "Moonsblood", and it received favorable acclaim. The album was recorded by Eyal Levi (guitarist for Dååth and recording engineer for the Black Dahlia Murder and The Contortionist) at Audiohammer Studios in Sanford, Florida. They toured the album with Norwegian progressive metal band Leprous in the United States and Canada.

Binary Code finished production of their yet-to-be-released album in late 2018, entitled "Memento Mori" to signify a tragic event the band endured in early 2017. The album was engineered by Aaron Smith (7 Horns 7 Eyes) and John Douglass (Audiohammer Studios). A teaser trailer for the studio documentary they will be releasing surfaced in February which also promotes a new song, "Filaments Dissolve".

== Personnel ==
=== Current members ===
- Oded Weinstock - vocals (2013–present)
- Jesse Zuretti - guitar (2004–present)
- PJ Spilletti - guitar (2015–present)
- Connor Appleton - bass (2015–present)
- Austin Blau - drums (2017–present)

=== Former Members ===
- Thomas Gallagher - vocals (2004)
- Sean Woodham - vocals (2007-2008)
- Michael Apprich - vocals (2008-2010)
- Rory Crumm - vocals (2010-2011)
- Joseph Spiller (System Divide, Aborted) - guitar (2004-2005)
- Dave Corring - bass (2004-2005)
- Thomas Latimer (the Banner) - bass (2005-2006)
- Christopher Hawkins (Midian) - drums (2005)
- Umar Fahim - drums (2008-2013) (Recorded drums on the "Moonsblood" album)

=== Former Touring Members ===
- Todd Stern (Abacinate, Hammerfight) - guitar (2009-2010)
- Brett Bamberger (Revocation, East of the Wall) - bass (2009-2011)

== Discography ==
- The Black Phantasma Demo (2004)
- Within Its Ocean Demo 2004 (2004)
- 2005 3 Song Demo (2005)
- Watch the Skies Collapse Demo (2006)
- Demo 2008 (2008)
- the Story (2008)
- Suspension of Disbelief (2009)
- Priest EP (2010)
- Moonsblood (2016)
- Memento Mori (2020)
