= Lars Eikind =

Norwegian musician

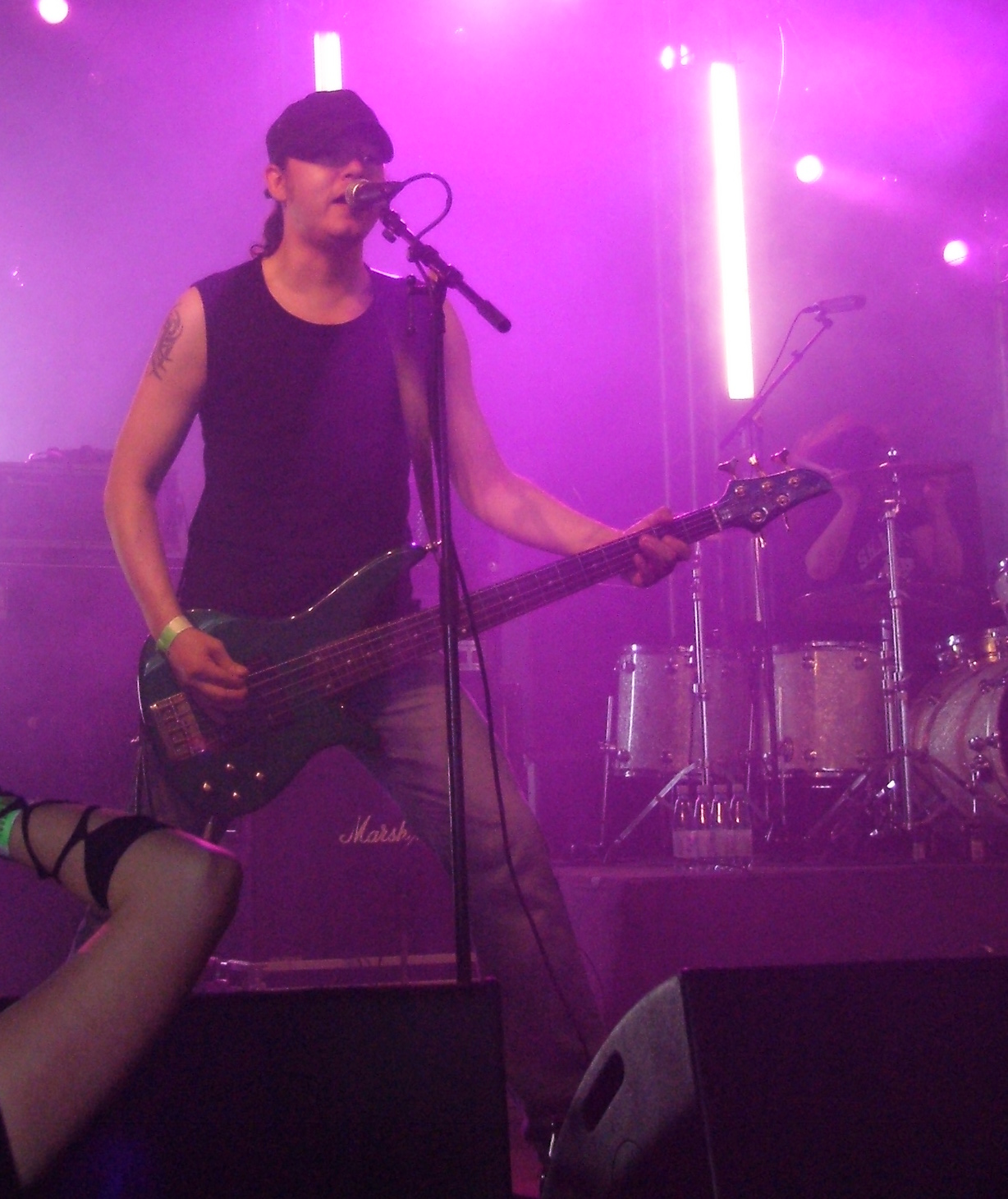
- Eikind in 2008

Background information
- Also known as: Lars Eric Si
- Born: Lars Eikind Sätheren; 4 April 1974 (age 52)
- Origin: Norway
- Genres: Black metal, progressive metal, melodic death metal, neoclassical metal, avant garde metal, heavy metal, grunge, industrial metal
- Occupations: Musician, songwriter, producer
- Instruments: Vocals, bass, guitar, keyboards
- Member of: Winds, Age of Silence
- Formerly of: Before the Dawn, Dawn of Solace

Lars Eikind Sätheren, also known as Lars Eric Si, has been a part of the Scandinavian rock/metal scene for many years both as musician and producer. He has been involved in numerous bands, either as a full-time or session member.

The first band he ever recorded with was the heavy metal/grunge group Jack in the Box, where he had the role of lead singer. He recorded one EP and one full-length album with them, before he left the band in 1995. (Jack in the Box came together again in 2010, after 15 years of silence.) After a while he became a part of the band DawG, which never released anything. Then he became the session-bassist for the black metal band Tulus.

He participated on the album "Evil 1999", and the collection "Cold Core Collection". When Tulus evolved into Khold, he became a full-time member of the band. He played on their debut album, "Masterpiss of Pain" before he left the band for personal reasons. During this time, he was also vocalist in the metal band Sensa Anima which included several members from Khold and Tulus. They won the Norwegian grammy "Spellemannsprisen" in 2001. The band only recorded one album, "SinThatic".

He formed his own black metal project named Eikind. In 2004, they released the EP "Vargtime" on Selbstmord Services. A full-length album called "Fucking Ratfest" was scheduled for release in 2006 on the same company. This, however, did not happen. Through the band's website, Eikind proclaimed that in his eyes the contract with Selbstmord Services was not valid. He also accused it for not being a serious record company. The future of the band, or if the album ever will be released, is unknown.

He joined the prog metal band Winds as bassist/vocalist. The band included several prominent musicians, including Jan Axel von Blomberg of Mayhem. In this band, he really got to show his talent as a singer. He joined also the other members in the band Age of Silence, where Lars Are Nedland handled the lead vocals. Eikind played bass and did some backing vocal parts.

He currently resides in Jyväskylä, Finland and was formerly a member of the band Before the Dawn and side-project Dawn of Solace.
