= Acceleration (album) =

Studio album by Age of Silence
- Released: September 14, 2004
- Recorded: 2004
- Genres: Avant-garde metal, progressive metal
- Length: 45:10
- Label: The End Records
- Producer: Andy Winter

Age of Silence chronology
| Acceleration (2004) | Complication - Trilogy Of Intricacy (2005) |

Professional ratings
Review scores
| Source | Rating |
|---|---|
| Allmusic | 3.5/5 stars |

Acceleration is the first full-length album by Norwegian avant-garde progressive metal band Age of Silence. It was released on September 14, 2004.

== Track listing ==
1. "Auditorium of Modern Movements" (Winter, Lazare) – 3:36
2. "Acceleration" (Winter, Lazare) – 4:30
3. "The Concept of Hate" (Winter, Lazare) – 4:09
4. "A Song for D. Incorporated" (Winter, Lazare) – 4:58
5. "The Green Office and the Dark Desk Drawer" (Winter, Lazare) – 4:17
6. "The Flow at 9:30 am" (Winter, Lazare) – 6:25
7. "Of Concrete and Glass" (Winter, Lazare) – 3:14
8. "90° Angles" (Extant, Lazare) – 7:19
9. "I No Longer Know If I Am Mad" (Extant, Kobbergaard) – 2:28
10. "Synthetic, Fabricated, Calculated" (Extant, Lazare) – 4:11

== Personnel ==
- Lars Are "Lazare" Nedland – vocals
- Jan Axel "Hellhammer" Blomberg – drums
- Lars Eikind "Si" – bass, backing vocals
- Joacim "Extant" Solheim – guitar
- Helge "Kobbergaard" Haugen – guitar, vocals on “I No Longer Know If I Am Mad”
- Andy Winter – keyboards
