= Lich King (band) =

American thrash metal band

- Origin: Amherst, Massachusetts, U.S.
- Genres: Thrash metal; comedy rock
- Years active: 2004–present
- Members: Nick Timney; Joe Nickerson; Mike Dreher; Brian Westbrook; Zachary Smith
- Website: lichkingmetal.com

Lich King is an American thrash metal band formed in 2004 in Amherst, Massachusetts.

== History ==
Tom Martin formed Lich King in 2004 as a solo project. It became a full band in 2009. The band was influenced by 1980s thrash metal and inspired by bands such as Slayer, D.R.I, and Exodus. Lich King's songs are generally humorous. Martin left the band in 2015, pronouncing "thrash metal dead" due to the instability of a touring band and the low income. The band found a new vocalist and continued performing live and releasing albums, such as The Omniclasm in 2017. The band toured Germany, Australia, and New Zealand.

== Members ==
Current members

- Tom Martin – vocals (2004–2015), songwriting (2004–present)
- Brian Westbrook – drums, percussion, songwriting (2004–present)
- Joe Nickerson – bass (2004–2010), rhythm guitar (2011–present)
- Nick Timney – bass (2013–2014), lead guitar (2015–present)
- Mike Dreher – bass (2015–present)
- Zachary Smith – vocals (2017–present)

Former members

- Erick Herrera – guitar (2004–2010)
- Kevin Taylor – guitar (2004–2010)
- Dave Hughes – bass (2011–2013)
- Rob Pellegri – lead guitar (2011–2015)
- Ryan Taylor – vocals (2015–2017)

== Discography ==
=== Studio albums ===
- Necromantic Maelstrom (2007)
- Toxic Zombie Onslaught (2008)
- World Gone Dead (2010)
- Super Retro Thrash (2011)
- Born of the Bomb (2012)
- The Omniclasm (2017)

=== Demos ===
- Necromantic Maelstrom (2006)

=== Extended plays ===
- Do-Over (2014)
