= Min Tid Skal Komme =

Studio album by Fleurety
- Released: 1995
- Recorded: Panser Studio, February 1995
- Genres: Black metal Avant-garde metal Post-black metal
- Length: 44:43
- Label: Aesthetic Death / Misanthropy Records
- Producers: Svein Egil Hatlevik and Alexander Nordgaren

Fleurety chronology
A Darker Shade of Evil (1994)	Min Tid Skal Komme (1995)	Last-Minute Lies (1999)

Professional ratings
Review scores
Source	Rating
AllMusic	3/5 stars

Min Tid Skal Komme (Norwegian for My Time Shall Come) is the debut album by the Norwegian avant-garde metal band Fleurety. The album was re-released in 2003 with the inclusion of their EP A Darker Shade of Evil by Candlelight Records. In 2008 it was re-released on vinyl in a limited edition of 600 copies through Aesthetic Death Records. In 2019 Peaceville Records remastered and re-released the album on CD and vinyl with the original artwork.

All music and lyrics are by Svein Egil Hatlevik and Alexander Nordgaren.

In 2013, Decibel ranked Min Tid Skal Komme at number 81 on its list of the Top 100 Black Metal Albums of All Time.

== Track listing ==
1. "Fragmenter Av En Fortid" – 9:37
2. "En Skikkelse I Horisonten" – 11:33
3. "Hvileløs?" – 5:24
4. "Englers Piler Har Ingen Brodd" – 12:32
5. "Fragmenter Av En Fremtid" – 5:37

== Reissue ==
1. "Fragmenter Av En Fortid" (Fragments Of A Past) – 9:30
2. "En Skikkelse I Horisonten" (A Shape In The Horizon)– 11:28
3. "Hvileløs" (Restless)– 5:21
4. "Englers Piler Har Ingen Brodd" (Angels' Arrows Have No Sting) – 12:28
5. "Fragmenter Av En Fremtid" (Fragments Of A Future)– 5:42
6. "Absence" – 5:58
7. "Profanations Beneath The Bleeding Stars" – 5:12
8. "...And The Choirs Behind Him" – 1:31
9. "My Resurrection In Eternal Hate" – 4:58

== Credits ==
- Alexander Nordgaren - Guitar, Vocals (additional)
- Svein Egil Hatlevik - Keyboards, Drums, Vocals
- Per Amund Solberg - Bass
- Marian Aas Hansen - Additional Vocals
