= Sculptured =

American experimental progressive metal band

- Origin: Portland, Oregon, United States
- Genres: Experimental metal, progressive metal, melodic death metal
- Years active: 1996–present
- Label: The End Records BMG
- Members: Don Anderson; Marius Sjoli; Jason Walton; Hunter Ginn; Andy Winter
- Past members: Tom Walling; Dave Murray; Brian Yager; Burke Harris; Clint Idsinga; Chris Maycock; John Schlegel; John Haughm; Martti Hill
- Website: Sculptured on Facebook

Sculptured is an American experimental and progressive metal band, mixing melodic and atonal segments.

== History ==
Following the dissolution of his previous band, guitarist Don Anderson formed Sculptured in 1996, initially as a one-man project. With John Schlegel on drums and Brian Yager on clean vocals, Sculptured recorded their 1996 demo Fulfillment in Tragedy. The demo secured them a deal with Poland's Mad Lion Records for their debut album The Spear of the Lily is Aureoled (1998), which was eventually licensed as the fourth release of the recently formed record label The End Records in North America. The album contained the material from Fulfillment in Tragedy alongside four new songs recorded at the same studio (Soundtracks) and with the same engineer (Ronn Chick).

Around the same time, the band recorded a cover of Iron Maiden's song "Iron Maiden" for a tribute album titled Maiden America: Iron Maiden Tribute. The band's version of the song featured a doomy and slower intro with nylon string guitars, and a jazz/swing middle part featuring trumpet.

Sculptured released their sophomore recording Apollo Ends in 2000, released worldwide through The End Records. This album expanded upon the usage of brass instruments in the debut and had a greater emphasis on atonality and dissonance. The core lineup for Apollo Ends consisted of Anderson, Yager, Jason Walton on bass, and John Haughm on drums; this lineup, minus Yager, was also the lineup for John Haughm's main project at the time, Agalloch, and the trio of Anderson, Walton and Haughm rehearsed and recorded both Apollo Ends and Agalloch's Pale Folklore, released the previous year, at the same time.

In 2001, the band (without Walton) recorded a cover of Goblin's main theme from Suspiria for an unreleased Goblin tribute album. This cover was released on The End Records' 2002 sampler Phases: the Dark Side of Music.

Sculptured's third album, Embodiment: Collapsing Under the Weight of God, was released in 2008. The lineup on this album consisted of a returning Walton, Dave Murray on drums, Andy Winter on keyboards, and Tom Walling on vocals. The album was composed predominantly with atonal and serialist techniques, using what Anderson called 4-tone row matrices.

In 2021, Sculptured released The Liminal Phase, after years of dormancy due to Anderson focusing on Agalloch. In an interview with Decibel, Anderson stated that he "had ideas going [for Sculptured] since 2010", and the songwriting for the album was wrapped up following Agalloch's 2016 breakup, with the album being recorded in the years following. The lineup for The Liminal Phase features returning members Jason Walton and Andy Winter, with the addition of drummer Martti Hill (from Barrowlands), and vocalist Marius Sjoli.

== Discography ==
=== Full-length albums ===
- The Spear of the Lily is Aureoled (1998)
- Apollo Ends (2000)
- Embodiment (2008)
- The Liminal Phase (2021)

=== Compilations ===
- Until the End of Time: An End Records Compilation (1998)
- Maiden America: Iron Maiden Tribute (1998)
- White: Nightmares in the End: An End Records Compilation (1999)
- Phases: the Dark Side of Music: An End Records Compilation (2002)

== Personnel ==
=== Current members ===
- Don Anderson − guitars, vocals (1996−present)
- Jason Walton − bass guitar (1997−present)
- Andy Winter − keyboards (2006−present)
- Marius Sjoli − vocals, guitars (2016−present)
- Hunter Ginn − drums (2022−present)

=== Past members ===
- John Schlegel − drums (1996−1998)
- Nick Wusz − guitars (1996−1998)
- Chris Black − drums (1998)
- Brian Yager − vocals (1998−2001)
- Burke Harris − trumpet (2000)
- Clint Idsinga − trombone (2000)
- John Haughm − drums, backing vocals (2000)
- Tom Walling − vocals (2006−2010)
- Dave Murray − drums (2006−2016)
- Martti Hill − drums (2016−2022)
