= Krek (album) =

Studio album by Khold
- Released: 18 October 2005
- Genre: Black metal
- Length: 33:56
- Label: Tabu

Khold chronology
De dødes tjern (2005)	Krek (2005)	Hundre år gammal (2008)

Professional ratings
Review scores
Source	Rating
AllMusic	3.5/5 stars

Krek is the fourth studio album by Norwegian black metal band Khold. It was released on 18 October 2005, through Tabu Recordings.

== Track listing ==
1. "Krek" - 2:08
2. "Blod og blek" - 3:05
3. "Innestengt i eikekiste" - 3:22
4. "Oskorei" - 3:46
5. "Byrde" - 3:37
6. "Lysets flukt" - 3:45
7. "Grepet om kniven" - 3:03
8. "Midvinterblot" - 3:52
9. "Varde" - 3:07
10. "Silur wie" - 4:15
