= Of Entity and Mind =

EP by Winds
- Released: 2001
- Genre: Progressive metal
- Length: 21:18
- Label: Avantgarde Music

Winds chronology
Of Entity and Mind (2001)	Reflections of the I (2002)

Professional ratings
Review scores
Source	Rating
AllMusic	3/5 stars

Of Entity and Mind is the first EP by the Norwegian progressive metal band Winds. It consists of an intro and 4 songs.

== Track listing ==
- 1 "Inception Perspective" (1:28)
- 2 "In All Reflections" (4:19)
- 3 "Bloodstained and Sworn" (5:46)
- 4 "Mirrored in Time" (4:58)
- 5 "An Eternity of Dreams" (4:43)
