= Khold =

Norwegian black metal band

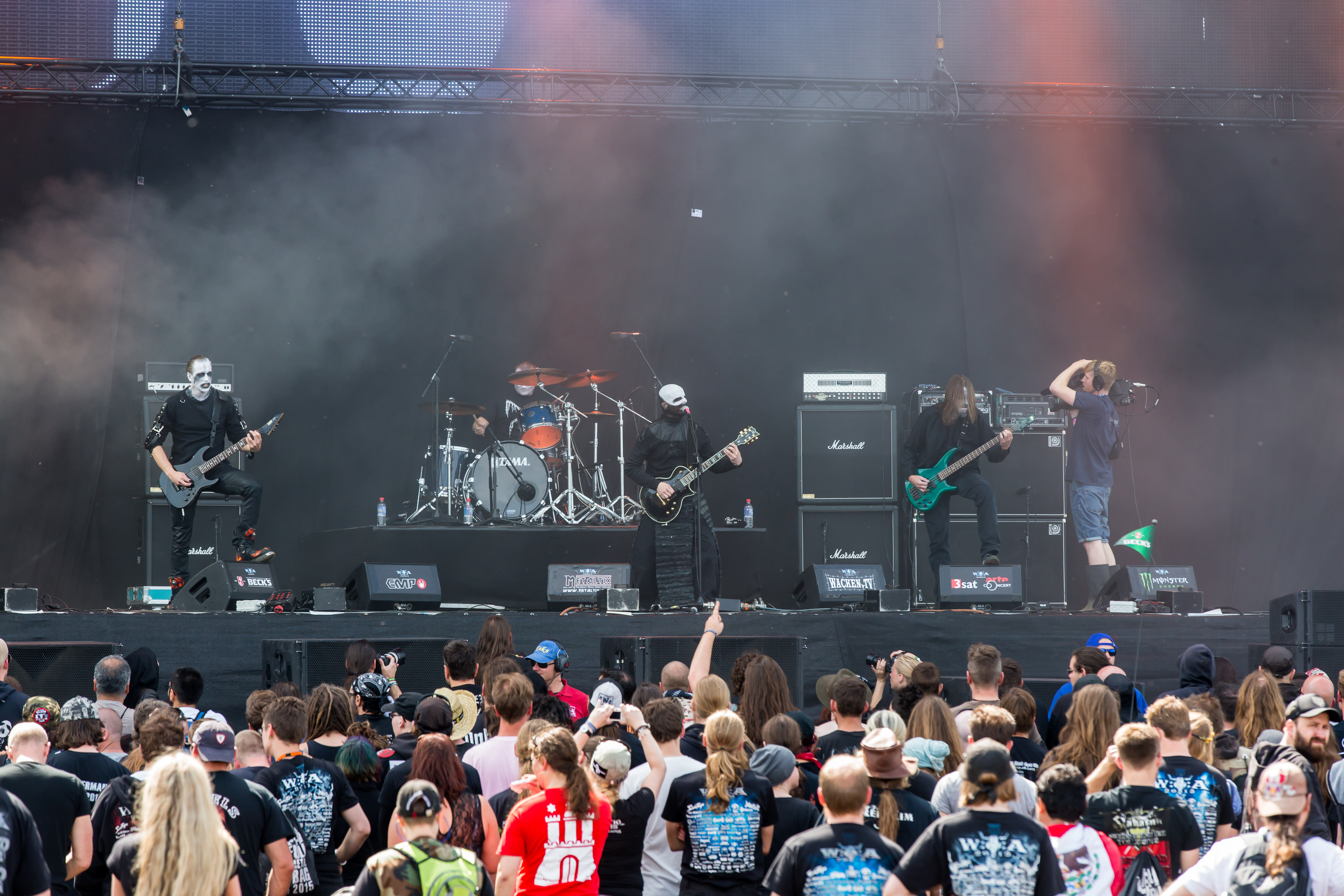
- Khold at Wacken Open Air 2015

Background information
- Origin: Oslo, Norway
- Genre: Black metal
- Years active: 2000–present
- Labels: Moonfog, Candlelight, Tabu
- Members: Gard; Rinn; Crowbel; Sarke; Hildr
- Past members: Eikind; Brandr; Sir Graanug; Grimd

Khold is a Norwegian black metal band formed in Oslo in 2000 after the split-up of Tulus. The band plays mid-paced black metal.

== History ==
Khold was formed in Oslo in 2000. They band recorded a demo in late 2000, and signed to Moonfog.

Khold released Masterpiss of Pain in 2001. Later that year, Khold toured Europe to support the album.

Khold released second album Phantom in 2002.

In late 2003, Khold recorded Mørke gravers kammer and made a music video for the song "Død". Candlelight Records released the album in 2004.

Khold went on another Norwegian tour in 2005, and recorded Krek, released on 10 October on Tabu Records.

Khold returned in 2008 with Hundre År Gammal, released on 9 June.

After returning to the live scene in 2011 at Wacken Open Air, Khold has played a couple of festivals each year.

In 2014, Khold released Til Endes and continued to perform at festivals throughout Europe and the US.

In June 2021, Khold signed to Soulseller Records and were expected to release their first album in eight years in 2022. The group released a full-length album in 2024, their first in two years.

== Style ==
=== Lyrical style ===
Drummer Sarke explained their lyrical style thus:

Our lyrics deal much about death and what surrounds death. Always the old way: sickness, mad people, ancient beliefs and so on. Hildr writes our lyrics and she does it very well. The reason we have Norwegian lyrics is because it fits our music better and gives us more inspiration to make dark, cold music.

Regarding the religious aspect often present in black metal, Sarke noted:

We are not into Jesus or whatever; we write our own stories. We can of course use the name God or Satan in our lyrics. If so, its just a part of a story. I can't understand why people still believe in that shit.

=== Musical style ===
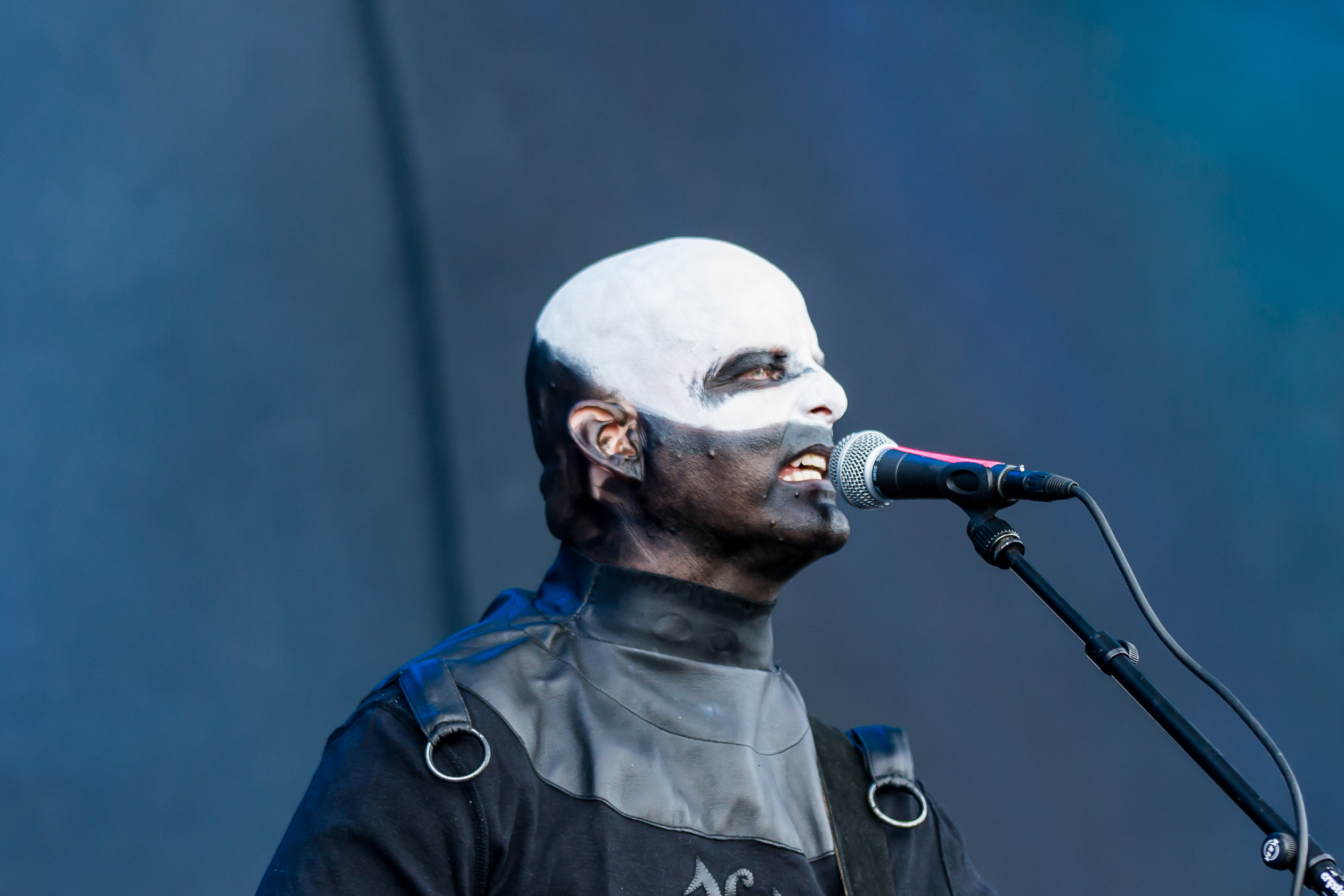
Khold at Wacken Open Air 2015

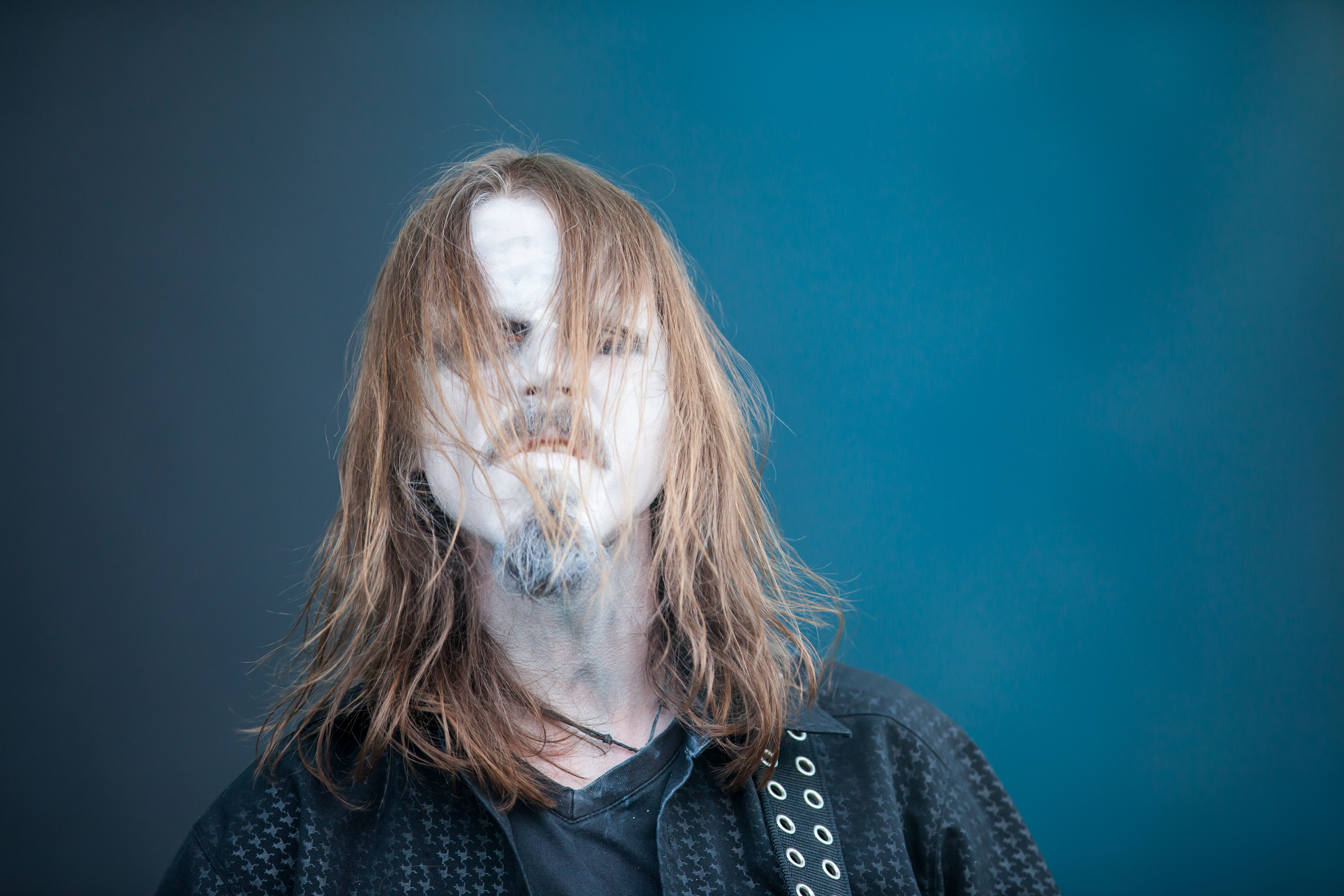
Khold at Wacken Open Air 2015

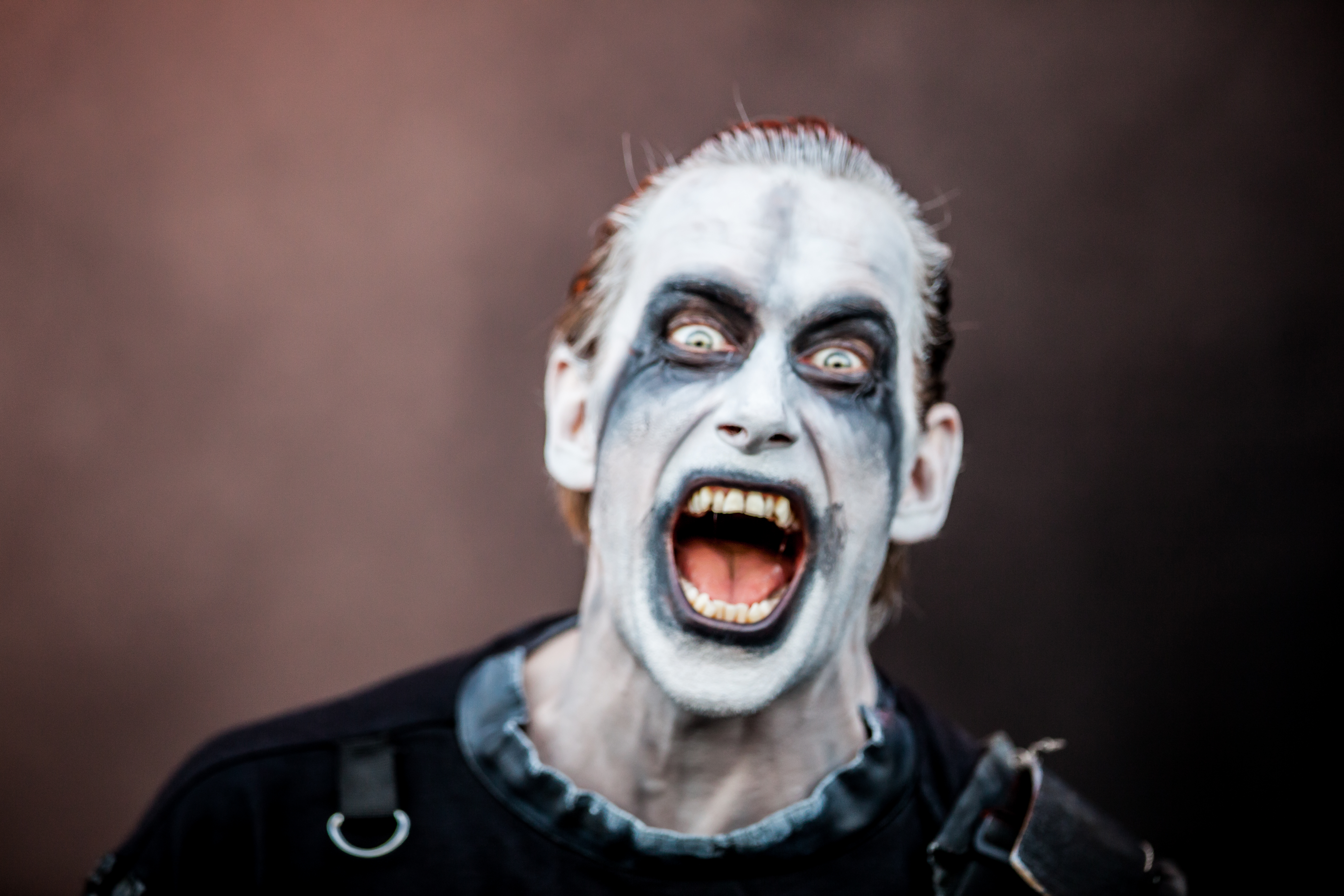
Khold at Wacken Open Air 2015

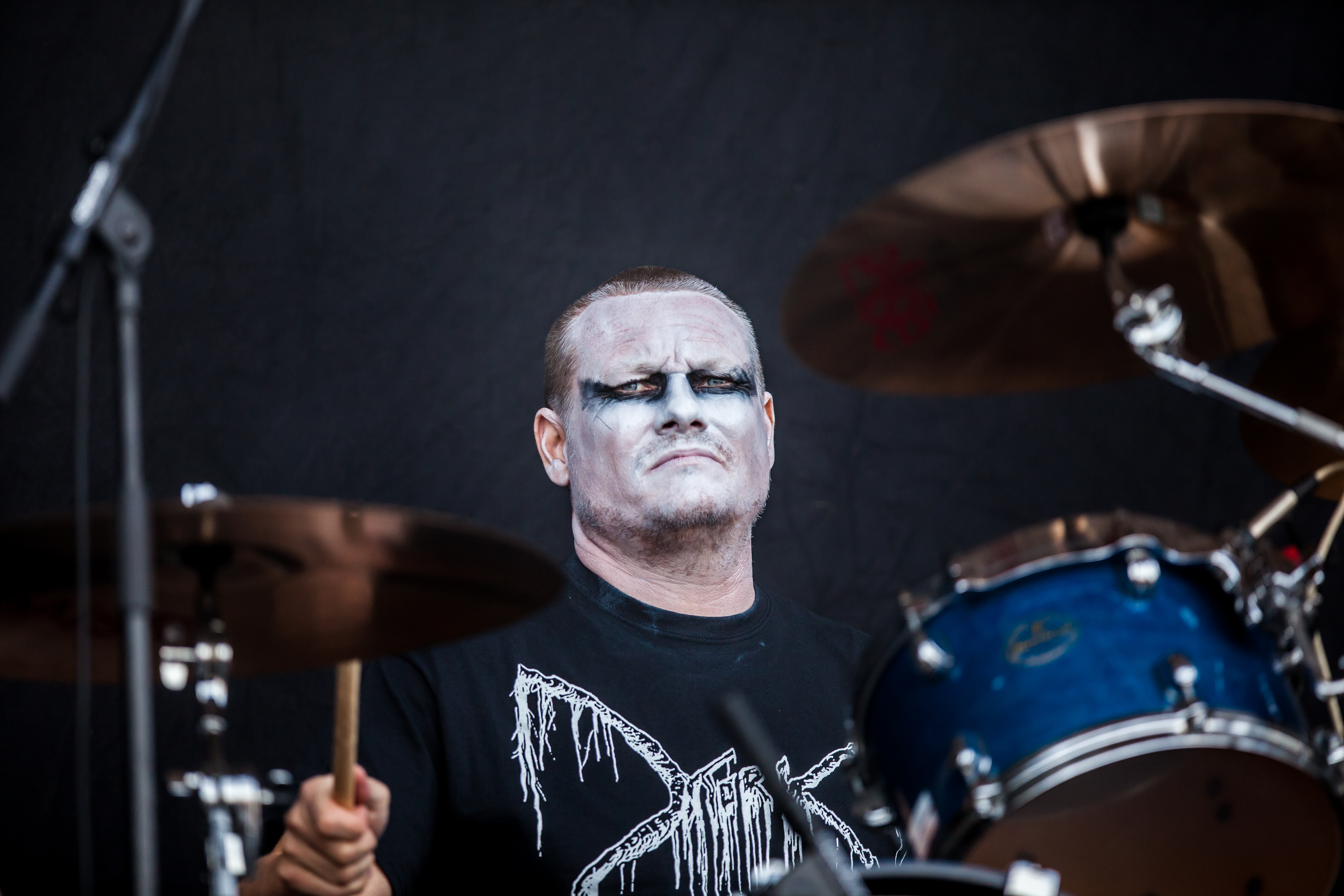
Khold at Wacken Open Air 2015

Khold play their music in a raw and primitive manner, using only guitar, bass guitar and drums. The lyrics are all written in ancient Norwegian, with the intention of enhancing the songs' concepts. Their music has been described as "black 'n' roll" by some.

== Discography ==
- Masterpiss of Pain (2001)
- Phantom (2002)
- Mørke gravers kammer (2004)
- Krek (2005)
- Hundre år gammal (2008)
- Til Endes (2014)
- Svartsyn (2022)
- Du Dømmes Til Død (2024)

== Personnel ==
=== Current line-up ===
- Gard – vocals, guitar
- Rinn – guitar
- Crowbel – bass guitar (since 2013)
- Sarke – drums
- Hildr – lyrics

=== Former members ===
- Eikind – bass guitar (2000–2002)
- Brandr – bass guitar (for a couple of gigs in 2002)
- Sir Graanug – bass guitar on the Phantom album
- Grimd – bass guitar from 2002 until 2012
