= Tulus (band) =

Norwegian black metal band

- Origin: Oslo, Norway
- Genres: Black metal
- Years active: 1993–2000, 2006–present
- Members: Blodstrup; Stian M. Kråbøl; Sarke; Hilde Nymoen
- Past members: Sir Graanug; Gottskalk; Eikind; Anders Hunstad

Tulus is a Norwegian black metal band formed in Oslo in 1991. Members of Tulus later went and formed the band Khold. After Khold went on hold in 2006, Blodstrup and Sarke resurrected Tulus. Tulus has a "fourth member": Blodstrup's wife, Hildr (Hilde Nymoen), who writes all lyrics for both Tulus and Khold.

== Discography ==
Studio albums

- Pure Black Energy (1996)
- Mysterion (1998)
- Evil 1999 (1999)
- Biography Obscene (2007)
- Olm og Bitter (2012)
- Old Old Death (2020)
- Fandens Kall (2023)

Demos

- Demo I (1993)
- Samlarens Kammer (1994)
- Midtvintermåne (1995)

Compilation albums

- Cold Core Collection (2000)

== Band members ==
=== Current members ===
- Crowbel – bass
- Sarke – drums
- Blodstrup – vocals, guitars
- Hildr – lyrics

=== Former members ===
- Sir Graanug – bass
- Gottskalk – bass
- Eikind – guitars, bass
- Anders Hunstad – keyboards

== See also ==
- Early Norwegian black metal scene
