= List of avant-garde metal artists =

This is a list of avant-garde metal artists, regional scenes, and record labels. Avant-garde metal or avant-metal, also known as experimental metal, is a subgenre of heavy metal music loosely defined by use of experimentation and characterized by the use of innovative, avant-garde elements, large-scale experimentation, and the use of non-standard and unconventional sounds, instruments, song structures, playing styles, and vocal techniques. It evolved out of progressive rock and various forms of metal, including extreme metal, particularly the extreme subgenre death metal. Some early examples are the King Crimson releases Larks' Tongues in Aspic and Red in 1973 and 1974 respectively, and the 1976 Led Zeppelin album Presence. The genre emerged in the early 1980s through the efforts of bands such as Celtic Frost and Voivod, who pioneered the genre. Other pioneers of avant-garde metal include Boris, Earth, Helmet, maudlin of the Well, Neurosis, Sunn O))), and Mr. Bungle. In the late 1990s, Misanthropy Records emerged as a promoter of Norwegian avant-garde metal until it folded in 2000, and, according to Jeff Wagner, in the late 1990s and early 2000s, a so-called "new wave of avant-garde metal" was spearheaded by The End Records. Some other record labels which promote avant-garde metal are Aurora Borealis, The Flenser, Holy Records, Hydra Head Records, Ipecac Recordings, Napalm Records, the Relapse Entertainment imprint of Relapse Records, Seventh Rule Recordings, and Southern Lord Records. In the United States, local avant-garde metal scenes have emerged in the San Francisco Bay Area, with bands such as Giant Squid, Grayceon, and Ludicra, Boston, with bands such as Isis, Kayo Dot, and maudlin of the Well and Seattle. According to the New York Times, some regional scenes that developed in the mid-1990s included the cities of Tokyo, Los Angeles, and Oslo.

== Record labels ==
- The End Records
- The Flenser
- Holy Records
- Hydra Head Records
- Ipecac Recordings
- Misanthropy Records
- Napalm Records
- Relapse Entertainment, imprint of Relapse Records
- Seventh Rule Recordings
- Southern Lord Records
- Sumerian Records

== Regional scenes ==
- Norway
  - Oslo
- Japan
  - Tokyo
- United States
  - Boston
  - Los Angeles
  - San Francisco Bay Area
  - Seattle

== Artists ==
=== 0–9 ===
- 81db

=== A ===
- Abstrakt Algebra
- Agalloch
- Age of Silence
- Ahleuchatistas
- Ai Weiwei
- Alarum
- The Algorithm
- Altera Enigma
- Amenra
- Animals as Leaders
- Antigama
- Arashk
- Arcturus
- Atheist
- Avenged Sevenfold

=== B ===
- Babymetal
- Mick Barr
- Behold the Arctopus
- Bethlehem
- Black Flag
- Blut Aus Nord
- The Body
- Boris
- Borknagar
- Boulder
- Breadwinner
- Buckethead
- Buried Inside

=== C ===
- Candiria
- Cave In
- Celtic Frost
- Cephalic Carnage
- Circle
- Cojum Dip
- Conelrad
- Coroner
- The Contortionist
- Cronian
- Chryst
- Cult of Luna
- Cynic

=== D ===
- December Wolves
- Devilish Impressions
- The Devin Townsend Project
- Devolved
- Diablo Swing Orchestra
- The Dillinger Escape Plan
- Dir En Grey
- Disharmonic Orchestra
- Dødheimsgard
- Dog Fashion Disco
- Doom
- Draconian

=== E ===
- Earth
- The End
- Envy
- Ephel Duath
- Ewigkeit
- Extol

=== F ===
- Fact
- Fantômas
- The Flying Luttenbachers
- Frantic Bleep
- From a Second Story Window

=== G ===
- The Gathering
- Genghis Tron
- Giant Squid
- Glassjaw
- God
- Godflesh
- Grayceon
- Green Carnation

=== H ===
- Hammers of Misfortune
- Hawk Eyes
- Head of David
- Hella
- Helmet
- Horse the Band
- Hortus Animae
- Hypno5e

=== I ===
- Imperial Triumphant
- Inhale Exhale
- Into Another
- Intronaut
- Jon Irabagon
- Isis
- Iwrestledabearonce

=== J ===
- Jane's Addiction
- Jesu

=== K ===
- Kayo Dot
- Kekal
- Khanate
- Khlyst
- Killing Joke
- King Crimson
- KK Null
- The Kovenant
- Krallice
- Kylesa

=== L ===
- Lengsel
- Leprous
- Liturgy
- Living Colour
- Locrian
- Ludicra

=== M ===
- Made Out of Babies
- Manes
- The Mars Volta
- Master's Hammer
- Mastodon
- Maudlin of the Well
- Mayhem
- The Meads of Asphodel
- Melvins
- Meshuggah
- Motograter
- Mr. Bungle
- Mudvayne
- Mushroomhead
- My Dying Bride

=== N ===
- Naked City
- Napalm Death
- Neurosis
- The Number Twelve Looks Like You

=== O ===
- O'Brother
- O, Majestic Winter
- The Ocean
- Old
- Opera IX
- Opeth
- Orthrelm
- Oxbow

=== P ===
- Painkiller
- Pain of Salvation
- Pan.Thy.Monium
- Mike Patton
- Peccatum
- Pelican
- Pinkly Smooth
- Pin-Up Went Down
- Planning for Burial
- James Plotkin
- Polkadot Cadaver
- Portal
- Praxis
- Primus
- Protest the Hero
- Psychofagist
- Psyopus

=== Q ===
- Queenadreena
- Queensrÿche
- Qui

=== R ===
- Ram-Zet
- Vernon Reid
- Russian Circles

=== S ===
- Saccharine Trust
- Samsas Traum
- Sculptured
- Shining (Norwegian band)
- Shining (Swedish band)
- Sigh
- Sikth
- Sleepytime Gorilla Museum
- Smohalla
- Solefald
- Sound of Urchin
- Spektr
- Stolen Babies
- stOrk
- Strapping Young Lad
- Sunn O)))
- System of a Down

=== T ===
- Talons
- Therion
- Thought Industry
- Thrones
- Thy Catafalque
- Tiamat
- Today Is the Day
- Todd Smith
- Tomahawk
- Tombs
- The Tony Danza Tapdance Extravaganza
- Tool
- Treponem Pal
- Triptykon
- Twelve Foot Ninja

=== U ===
- Ufomammut
- Ulcerate
- Ulver
- Unexpect

=== V ===
- Ved Buens Ende
- Vernon Reid
- Virgin Black
- Vintersorg
- Voivod

=== W ===
- Waltari
- Winds
- Wrench in the Works

=== Y ===
- Yakuza

=== Z ===
- Zoroaster
- Zeal & Ardor

== See also ==
- List of progressive metal bands
- List of mathcore bands
