= Ashes Against the Grain =

Studio album by Agalloch
- Released: August 8, 2006
- Recorded: December 10, 2005–January 2006
- Genres: Post-metal; folk metal; black metal; doom metal
- Length: 59:49
- Label: The End
- Producers: Agalloch, John Haughm, Ronn Chick

Agalloch chronology
The Mantle (2002)	Ashes Against the Grain (2006)	The White (2008)

Ashes Against the Grain is the third album by American metal band Agalloch, released by The End Records four years after the critically acclaimed The Mantle. Described as incorporating post-metal, folk metal and black metal, the band made an effort to expand the use of electric guitars and metal elements on the album, as opposed to The Mantle. The album has received critical acclaim since its release.

== Background ==
Following the release of The Mantle, Agalloch performed their first live shows. Due to the number of instruments and effects used on that album, the band had to make some changes to the arrangements of the songs so they could be more easily replicated when performed live. When it came time to record their next album, the band decided that a more stripped down approach was necessary, as they wanted to emulate the feeling of performing live on the new songs. Ashes Against the Grain focused more on electric guitars and metal elements, and had less of the post-rock and neofolk influence that was prominent on The Mantle.

== Recording ==
In an interview on the Silence of Forgotten Landscapes DVD, John Haughm stated that the album was recorded during a time when he had renewed his liking for metal, after taking a break from it and focusing on other musical influences during the Mantle sessions. Lyrically, Haughm took a more simplistic and abstract approach, in contrast to earlier albums.

Haughm had played drums on the previous albums, but for Ashes Against the Grain, Haughm wanted to concentrate more on his songwriting and guitar parts, and drummer Chris Greene was brought in. Greene had joined the band when they began playing live in 2003, and played drums on all the tracks except for "Falling Snow" and "Not Unlike the Waves". Greene parted ways with Agalloch following their 2006 European tour, as the band felt that he was not developing well as a live drummer. He was replaced by Ludicra drummer Aesop Dekker.

The recording process was described by the band as "hell from start to finish". A number of production problems were encountered, including a computer glitch which resulted in the Wave files being lost. Many of the songs ended up being reworked from the original demos, in particular, "Fire Above, Ice Below", about which Haughm said "something got lost in the transition from the demo recording to the album recording".

Despite the band's intention of Ashes being a more stripped-down album, Haughm has since stated that the album sounds "too polished", and that he prefers the more raw sound of their later album, Marrow of the Spirit. In a 2013 interview, he said that Ashes Against the Grain is "definitely the worst album we have made". During a 2021 interview with Metalist Magazine, however, he appeared to have softened towards the album and the production, saying, "In hindsight, it suited the songs alright."

=== Dedication ===
The album was dedicated in memory of Christoph Florian Rehse (of Escape the Day), who committed suicide in 2005.

== Release ==
Before the release, the track "Falling Snow" was made available in its entirety on the label's website and on the band's MySpace page. A pre-release review in the July 2006 issue of Toronto-based Exclaim! magazine described the new album as a "departure and an extension" from the band's previous work:

The songs tend to move with restraint, as Agalloch's characteristic threads of black metal, folk and ambient sounds coalesce with more doom and art rock.

Three versions of the album were released: a slipcase edition, a deluxe wooden box version (limited to 500 copies) and a vinyl version (limited to 1000 copies). The vinyl version was released on March 2, 2007 on The End Records' Infinite Vinyl Series. It was pressed in three different colors:

- A clear/orange splatter edition limited to 200 copies.
- A black edition limited to 400 copies.
- A clear orange edition limited to 400 copies.

All three vinyl editions included an exclusive bonus track, Scars of the Shattered Sky (Our Fortress Has Burned to the Ground).

The album artwork was done by Aslak Tolonen.

Ashes Against the Grain was the final Agalloch album released on The End Records. The band opted not to renew their contract, and chose Profound Lore Records to release their following album, Marrow of the Spirit. In a 2010 interview, Haughm said that conflicts with The End founder Andreas Katsambas (possibly having to do with the treatment of the "Not Unlike the Waves" video) led to their decision not to renew their contract, though he stated that he had nothing personal against Katsambas.

== Reception ==
Professional ratings
Review scores
Source	Rating
AllMusic	5/5 stars
AbsolutePunk	91%
Brave Words & Bloody Knuckles	8/10
Chronicles of Chaos	9/10 stars
Metal Storm	8.9/10
PopMatters	9/10
Pitchfork	8.0/10
Punknews.org	4.5/5 stars
Sputnikmusic	5/5 stars
Stylus Magazine	B+
Metal Crypt	4.75/5 stars

The album received widespread critical acclaim upon release.

Pitchfork praised its "endless amount of hooks" and proclaimed "in the process of that intense musical exploration they've become an intriguing band, regardless of genre designation."

In a five-star review, AllMusic declared that "Agalloch's unique talents for evoking a constant sense of mysterious, atmospheric, ambiance supersedes most simplistic musical pigeonholing as black, death, or any kind of metal", naming Agalloch "the greatest American black metal band ever, or at the very least, the first American black metal band that really mattered."

PopMatters wrote, "Ashes Against the Grain is the kind of bold, invigorating album progressive metal fans crave, the kind of towering statement critics love, and the kind of record that deserves to have people of every musical interest flocking toward the metal section in stores. The future of American black metal has never looked so bright."

Writing for Sputnikmusic, Kyle Ward wrote, "As much as I struggle to say it, Portland, Oregon’s genre-bending metal act Agalloch is, to put it quite bluntly, one of the most important and interesting metal bands in the world today [...] Indeed, their unique nature-themed entourages play out like a deeply depressing and rather hateful film, in which the listener is but a ghost in the background, looking onward into the flowing scene with nothing but transfixion and a calming bliss."

== "Not Unlike the Waves" music video ==
A music video was recorded for the fifth track on the album, "Not Unlike the Waves". It was filmed in the woods near Portland by cinematographer Juan Mosqueda.

Haughm has stated that he is unhappy with the final version of the video, which was very different from the original sketch filmed by Mosqueda. Mosqueda's sketch featured smooth transitions between shots and what Haughm described as "glacial imagery", which pleased the band. However, the record company insisted on using an abridged version of the song, despite strong opposition from the band, and the final version of the video was heavily edited. "Frankly I do not consider the video to be finished and I hope we will get to make the full version…with a different editor", Haughm said. "All of the gorgeous, epic slow panning stuff was cut to hell. We wanted a cinematic video and the editor instead made something which he perceived as 'hip' and 'cool'".

Mosqueda's original sketch for the video was included as a bonus feature on Agalloch's 2009 DVD, The Silence of Forgotten Landscapes, with an introduction by Mosqueda and Haughm.

== Track listing ==
All lyrics are written by John Haughm; all music is composed by Haughm, Don Anderson and Jason William Walton, except where noted.

No.	Title	Music	Length
1.	"Limbs"		9:50
2.	"Falling Snow"		9:38
3.	"This White Mountain on Which You Will Die" (Instrumental)	Chris Greene	1:39
4.	"Fire Above, Ice Below"		10:28
5.	"Not Unlike the Waves"		9:15
6.	"Our Fortress Is Burning... I" (Instrumental)		5:25
7.	"Our Fortress Is Burning... II - Bloodbirds"		6:20
8.	"Our Fortress Is Burning... III - The Grain" (Instrumental)	Greene	7:09
Total length:			59:49

Limited edition bonus track
No.	Title	Length
9.	"Scars of the Shattered Sky (Our Fortress Has Burned to the Ground)" (Instrumental)	19:38
Total length:		79:27

== Personnel ==
- John Haughm – vocals, acoustic and electric guitars, drums (on "Not Unlike the Waves" and "Falling Snow")
- Don Anderson – acoustic & electric guitars
- Jason William Walton – bass
- Chris Greene – drums (all tracks except "Not Unlike the Waves" and "Falling Snow")
- Ronn Chick – E-Bow on "Fire Above, Ice Below", piano on "Limbs" and "Our Fortress Is Burning... I", production, mixing, engineering, editing
