= John Haughm =

American singer

- Haughm at Suomenlinna in Finland, 2019

Background information
- Born: September 14, 1975 (age 51); Ellensburg, Washington
- Origin: Portland, Oregon
- Genres: Progressive metal, black metal, doom metal, death metal, post-rock, folk metal, ambient
- Occupations: Musician, songwriter, graphic designer
- Instruments: Guitar, bass, drums, keyboards, synthesizer, vocals
- Years active: 1990–present
- Labels: The End, Vendlus, Profound Lore, Eisenwald Tonschmiede, Anthem, Dammerung Arts
- Member of: Agalloch
- Formerly of: Pillorian, Sculptured
- Website: haughm.bandcamp.com

John Haughm (/hɔːm/; born September 14, 1975) is an American musician and artist. He is most known for being the founder, guitarist, and vocalist of the band Agalloch, and later Pillorian. He is also a designer who has created packaging and merchandise for several record labels and bands, including every project in which he has performed.

== Early life ==
John Haughm was born in Ellensburg, Washington, and grew up in Butte, Montana, where he played in several metal bands as a teenager.

== Career ==
=== Agalloch and Sculptured (1996–2016) ===
Haughm and Walton moved to Portland where they met Don Anderson, guitarist of Sculptured, and found that they had "tremendously similar taste in music and cinema". Haughm founded Agalloch in January 1996, and had a brief stint in Sculptured, performing as the drummer on Apollo Ends.

=== Solo work (2011-present) ===
In 2011, Haughm began releasing experimental solo work and later ambient collaborations with Daniel Menche and Mathias Grassow. In 2014 his solo aesthetic shifted to a more cinematic and surrealist Western theme, heavily inspired by Ennio Morricone, Cormac McCarthy, the “Dead Man” film and soundtrack, the desolation of the Nevada desert, and Haughm’s time growing up in Montana. Between 2015 and 2024 he released three 19th century period piece albums known collectively as his “nomad trilogy” as well as several other releases in this aesthetic. His solo live performances are heavily layered multimedia presentations including video projections showing old surreal films from the 19th and early 20th century as well as Haughm’s own visuals collected from the desert and ruins of the Old West. Additionally on stage, Haughm dresses like a nomadic outlaw character utilizing several layers of antique clothing from the late 1800s.

=== Pillorian (2016–2019) ===
After Agalloch split in 2016, Haughm formed Pillorian with Stephen Parker and Trevor Matthews. This band was much more aggressive musically and more active as a touring act than Agalloch. They released Obsidian Arc in March 2017 and performed 100 shows in support of the album, including two American and two European tours between spring 2017 and summer 2018.

In February 2019, Haughm was criticized by his most recent former Agalloch bandmates for posting a sarcastic antisemitic comment on Facebook while paying tribute to the late Swiss actor Bruno Ganz. Both Parker and Matthews left Pillorian, leaving Haughm as the band's only remaining member.

Pillorian disbanded on February 28, 2019. In his apology letter, Haughm stated that his own comment was "insensitive, juvenile, reprehensible, and thoughtless to say the least." Haughm also signaled that Pillorian, despite having a second album completely written and ready to record, was retired as a band. In January 2020, an interview with Don Anderson indicated that he and John had mended their friendship and that Haughm regretted making the comment.

=== Post-Pillorian and Agalloch's reunion (2019–present) ===
In 2023, Agalloch reformed to play a few select shows and festivals.

== Discography ==
=== With Agalloch ===
- From Which of This Oak (cassette 1997, pic disc LP 2009)
- Promo 1998 (cassette 1998)
- Pale Folklore (CD 1999, 2×LP, ltd woodsleeve 2×LP 2005, 2xpic disc LP 2013, deluxe 2xLP/cassette/2xCD hardcover book 2023)
- Of Stone, Wind and Pillor (MCD 2001, LP 2015, CD/LP/pic disc 2021)
- The Mantle (CD, cassette 2002, 2×LP 2005, deluxe 2xLP/cassette/2xCD hardcover book 2024)
- Tomorrow Will Never Come (7-inch EP 2003)
- The Grey (MCD 2004, MCD/MLP 2019)
- Agalloch / Nest (10-inch pic disc, split EP 2004)
- Ashes Against the Grain (CD, 2×LP, ltd woodbox CD 2006, deluxe 2xLP/cassette/2xCD hardcover book 2025)
- Not Unlike The Waves (music video 2006)
- The White (MCD 2008, CD 2019, LP 2019)
- The Demonstration Archive (compilation CD 2008, 3×LP boxset 2012, 2xLP 2025)
- The Silence of Forgotten Landscapes (live DVD 2009)
- The Compendium Archive (compilation 2×CD 2010)
- Marrow of the Spirit (CD, cassette, 2×LP, 2xpic disc LP, ltd CD+7" boxset 2010)
- Whitedivisiongrey (compilation 2×CD digibook, 2×LP 2011)
- Faustian Echoes (MCD, etched 12-inch LP 2012)
- The Serpent & The Sphere (CD, cassette, etched 2×LP 2014, 2xpic disc LP 2015)
- Alpha Serpentis (Unukalhai) (7-inch single 2014, art edition 7-inch 2015)
- Oddities & Rarities 2001-2004 (2xLP 2025)
- V/A Satanic Lust (cassette 1997)
- V/A White: Nightmares in The End (CD 1999)
- V/A Sol Lucet Omnibus - Tribute to Sol Invictus (3CD 2002)
- V/A At the End of Infinity (CD 2002)
- V/A Nachtzauber (CD 2003)
- V/A Phases - The Dark Side of Music (CD 2004)
- V/A Alternate Endings (CD 2006)
- V/A The Dark Psyche (CD 2006)
- V/A The End Of Music As We Know It (compilation DVD 2006)
- V/A Fall Into Darkness Festival (DVD 2009)
- V/A Oak Folk (CD 2010)
- V/A Der Wanderer Uber Dem Nebelmeer - Tribute to Caspar David Friedrich (2CD 2011)
- V/A Summer Breeze 2015 (DVD 2015)
- V/A Autumn Fires/Fragmented Rays (CD 2021)
- V/A Label Compilation MMXXIII (Eisenwald digital compilation 2023)
- V/A Prophecy Fest MMXXIII Programme (2CD book 2023)

=== Solo ===
- +46° 17' 36.30", -124° 4' 20.13" (7" EP, 2011)
- 122012 & 042911 (cassette 2012)
- +37.717364 // -117.247955: The Last Place I Remember (cassette 2015, CD 2016, LP 2025)
- 1893 demo (cassette 2018)
- 1865 // 1895: CAST.IRON.BLOOD. (CD 2020, LP 2025)
- The Scars Maketh The Man (music video 2021)
- Whiskey & Rust (cassette 2022)
- 46°59'15.9"N // 120°32'15.4"W: The Devil’s Coil (CD 2024, LP 2025)
- To Thine Barbed Wire Noose Be True (music video 2025)
- No Matter What, I Will Not Send You Into The Darkness Alone: Live in Australia (LP 2025)
- The PCC Cascade Sessions EP (MCD 2025)
- MMXV//MMXXV: Bygone Hymns (LP 2026)
- V/A Spectral Echoes (CD 2024)
- V/A Haunters Of The Silence Soundtrack (CD 2025)
- V/A A Gray Day (CD 2026)

=== Collaborations ===
- w/ Mathias Grassow - Mosaic (CD 2012, LP 2015)
- w/ Daniel Menche - Orthrus (CD+7", 2012)
- w/ Mathias Grassow - Auræ (CD 2015)
- w/ Mathias Grassow - Opalus (CD 2020)
- w/ Sutekh Hexen & Funerary Call - P:R:I:S:M (CD, cassette, 2xLP 2023)

=== Film scores ===
- OUTCALL:Initiation (film score 2021)
- Haunters Of The Silence (film score 2025)

=== With Sculptured ===
- Apollo Ends (CD 2000)
- Suspiria (single 2000)

=== With Pillorian ===
- A Stygian Pyre (7" single 2017)
- Obsidian Arc (CD, cassette, LP 2017)

=== With Art of the Black Blood ===
- Deficit Omne Quod Nasciture (cassette 2007)
- The Woodcut Demonstration (LP 2014)

=== With BEAST ===
- Gnasher (digital album 2015)
- Prey (digital album 2015)
- Ravenous (digital album 2015)
- Live At The Doug Fir Lounge, Feb 28th, 2015 (digital live album 2015)

=== With Allerseelen ===
- Terra Incognita (guitar, CD 2015)
- Venezia (guitar, LP bonus track 2018)
- Frühgeschichte I. Schwartzer Rab (guitar, cassette bonus tracks 2019)

=== With Nest ===
- Trail of the Unwary (guest vocals, CD 2007, 2xLP 2026)
- Within A Decade (guest vocals, 3CD 2014)

=== With Nothing ===
- Nondescript: Ouroborus Vermiform (guest vocals, CD 1999)

=== With Nostalgia ===
- Echoes from the Borderland (guitar, CD 2010)

=== With Obsidian Tongue ===
- A Nest of Ravens in the Throat of Time (lead vocals on track 6, CD 2013)

=== With Andy Winter ===
- Incomprehensible (lead vocals on track 2, CD 2013)
