= The Grey (EP) =

EP by Agalloch
- Released: February 29, 2004
- Recorded: July 2003, August 2003
- Studio: Jackpot Studios, Portland, Oregon; Perfection of Silence, Portland, Oregon
- Genre: Post-rock; noise
- Length: 20:59
- Label: Vendlus
- Producer: Larry Crane; Jason William Walton

Agalloch chronology
Tomorrow Will Never Come (2003)	The Grey (2004)	Ashes Against the Grain (2006)

Professional ratings
Review scores
Source	Rating
Chronicles of Chaos	5.5/10

The Grey is the third EP by American metal band Agalloch. It was released by Vendlus Records on February 29, 2004, in a limited run of 1,000 copies. The two songs on The Grey are reinterpretations of two tracks from The Mantle album. This EP is part of a dichotomy, completed by The White EP.

== Track listing ==
No.	Title	Length
1.	"The Lodge (Dismantled)"	13:12
2.	"Odal" (Nothing Remix)	7:47
Total length:		20:59

Reissue bonus track
No.	Title	Length
3.	"ShadowDub (How Beautiful Is a Funeral)"	6:49
Total length:		27:47

== Personnel ==
Agalloch

- John Haughm – guitar, drums, artwork, layout
- Don Anderson – guitars, piano
- Chris Greene – drums
- Jason William Walton – bass, remix/recording (track 2)

Additional

- Larry Crane – recording, production (track 1)
- Ronn Chick – mixing
- Veleda Church – photography
