= The White (Agalloch EP) =

EP by Agalloch
- Released: February 29, 2008
- Recorded: 2004–2007
- Genres: Neofolk, dark ambient
- Length: 32:32
- Label: Vendlus
- Producers: John Haughm, Veleda Thorsson, Ronn Chick

Agalloch chronology
Ashes Against the Grain (2006)	The White (2008)	The Demonstration Archive 1996 - 1998 (2008)

Professional ratings
Review scores
Source	Rating
Allmusic	3.5/5 stars

The White is an EP by American metal band Agalloch, released on February 29, 2008. A follow-up to Agalloch's 2004 EP The Grey, it completed a dichotomy of releases for Vendlus Records. The White contained seven neofolk and dark ambient tracks written and recorded between 2004 and 2007. The release was limited to 2,000 copies.

The song "Sowilo Rune" (referencing the Sowilo rune) was posted on the band's official Myspace page on January 4. The songs "The Isle of Summer," "Summerisle Reprise," and "Sowilo Rune" contained samples from the 1973 film The Wicker Man. "Birch White" featured vocalist John Haughm reciting the poem "Birch Tree" by A. S. J. Tessimond in a style comparable to English neofolk band Death in June.

On November 29, 2019, Dämmerung Arts issued a remastered version of The White, including a bonus track from Marrow of the Spirit sessions.

== Track listing ==
No.	Title	Lyrics	Music	Length
1.	"The Isle of Summer"		Don Anderson	3:58
2.	"Birch Black"		Anderson	2:40
3.	"Hollow Stone"		Chuck Greene	4:15
4.	"Pantheist"		John Haughm	7:17
5.	"Birch White"	A. S. J. Tessimond	Anderson, Ty Brubaker	3:44
6.	"Sowilo Rune"	Anderson	Haughm	5:40
7.	"Summerisle Reprise"		Anderson	4:55
Total length:				32:32

2019 remastered edition bonus track
No.	Title	Lyrics	Music	Length
8.	"Where Shade Once Was"	Haughm	Haughm	5:14
Total length:				37:46

== Personnel ==
Agalloch

- John Haughm – acoustic guitar, electric guitar, bass guitar, baritone guitar, e-Bow, field recordings, vocals, production
- Don Anderson – acoustic guitar, electric guitar, piano

Additional personnel

- Chris Greene – synthesizer
- Ty Brubaker – accordion
- Markus Wolff – percussion
- Andrea Victoria Knippschild – background vocals
- Uta Plotkin – viola ("Where Shade Once Was")
- Veleda Thorsson – Jew's harp, Peruvian ceremonial horn, goat horn, production
- Ronn Chick – piano, synthesizer, mixing, mastering, production
