= The Demonstration Archive =

The Demonstration Archive 1996 - 1998

Compilation album by Agalloch
- Released: August 4, 2008
- Recorded: 1996–1998
- Genre: Folk metal, black metal, doom metal
- Length: 62:20
- Label: Licht von Dämmerung Arthouse, Eisenwald Tonschmiede

Agalloch chronology
The White (2008)	The Demonstration Archive 1996 - 1998 (2008)	The Silence of Forgotten Landscapes (2009)

The Demonstration Archive 1996 - 1998 is a compilation album by Agalloch featuring music from the band's unsigned years from 1996 to 1998. Tracks 1 through 3 were taken from Agalloch's first demo from 1997, From Which of This Oak; tracks 4 through 6 were from an unreleased 7" vinyl EP recorded in autumn 1998 called Of Stone, Wind and Pillor (later released as a limited-edition CD with bonus tracks by The End Records); and tracks 7 and 8 came from Agalloch's second demo Promo 1998.

All of the material was taken from the original DAT tapes and analog reels. Aside from some slight mastering to keep the songs at an even volume, nothing was edited or polished. The collection included a 12-page booklet with notes, contemporary artwork, and 1998 photos.

The recordings of "Hallways of Enchanted Ebony" and "The Melancholy Spirit" are not the same versions that appeared on the studio album Pale Folklore.

The Demonstration Archive 1996 - 1998 was released by Licht von Dämmerung Arthouse in 2008, and reissued as a box set in 2012 by Eisenwald Tonschmiede.

== Track listing ==
No.	Title	Length
1.	"The Wilderness"	11:18
2.	"As Embers Dress the Sky"	8:00
3.	"This Old Cabin"	13:18
4.	"Of Stone, Wind, and Pillor"	7:01
5.	"Foliorum Viridium"	2:41
6.	"Haunting Birds"	3:45
7.	"Hallways of Enchanted Ebony"	7:30
8.	"The Melancholy Spirit"	8:42
Total length:		62:20

== Personnel ==
- John Haughm - guitar, percussion, vocals
- Don Anderson - guitar
- Jason William Walton - bass
- Shane Breyer - keyboards

=== Production ===
- Michael Lastra - engineer (1 to 6)
- Ronn Chick - engineer (7 & 8)
- Gustave Doré - artwork
- Albrecht Dürer - artwork
- John Haughm - design
- Ronn Chick - compiler
- John Haughm - compiler
