= The Serpent & the Sphere =

Studio album by Agalloch
- Released: May 13, 2014
- Studios: Cloud City Sound, Portland, Oregon; Everything Hz, Portland, Oregon
- Genres: Black metal, doom metal, folk metal
- Length: 59:44
- Label: Profound Lore
- Producers: Agalloch, Billy Anderson

Agalloch chronology
Faustian Echoes (2012)	The Serpent & the Sphere (2014)	""Alpha Serpentis (Unukalhai)" single (2014)

The Serpent & the Sphere is the fifth and final studio album by American heavy metal band Agalloch. It was released on May 13, 2014 in the U.S., followed by releases on May 16 in Germany and May 19 in Europe.

== Reception ==
Professional ratings
Aggregate scores
Source	Rating
Metacritic	84/100
Review scores
Source	Rating
AbsolutePunk	8/10
AllMusic	3.5/5 stars
The Austin Chronicle	4/5 stars
Exclaim!	10/10
Metal Hammer	6/7
Metal Storm	8,3/10
Pitchfork	8.3/10
Slant Magazine	4/5 stars
Spin	8/10
Sputnikmusic	2/5

The album received mostly positive reviews. Michael Toland of The Austin Chronicle described the album as "one boot in balmy progressive folk and the other in frigid black metal" with "some of its prettiest, most haunted acoustic textures and heaviest, raspiest roars". Kim Kelly of Spin stated that the band's "blackened sound" is "more pronounced than ever" while describing the production as "impeccable: Agalloch have never sounded so rich, so full".

== Track listing ==
The Serpent & the Sphere track listing
No.	Title	Length
1.	"Birth and Death of the Pillars of Creation"	10:28
2.	"(serpens caput)"	3:06
3.	"The Astral Dialogue"	5:11
4.	"Dark Matter Gods"	8:36
5.	"Celestial Effigy"	6:59
6.	"Cor Serpentis (the sphere)"	2:58
7.	"Vales Beyond Dimension"	6:48
8.	"Plateau of the Ages"	12:26
9.	"(serpens cauda)"	3:12
Total length:		59:44

Japanese edition bonus tracks
No.	Title	Length
10.	"Omega Serpentis"	4:20
11.	"Sigma Serpentis"	2:49

== Personnel ==
Agalloch

- John Haughm – guitars, acoustic guitar, vocals, whisper, percussion, art direction
- Don Anderson – guitars, piano, keyboards
- Jason William Walton – bass
- Aesop Dekker – drums

Guest musicians

- Nathanaël Larochette (Musk Ox) – acoustic guitars (track 2, 6, 9)

Technical

- Justin Weis – mastering
- Veleda Thorsson – photography
- Billy Anderson – production
