= Vindensång =

American band

- Origin: Downingtown, Pennsylvania, United States
- Genres: Ambient, post-rock, experimental rock, experimental music
- Years active: 2005–present
- Labels: Archaic Lore Productions LLC
- Members: Jeffrey Neblock; Don Hussar; Doug Fisk

Vindensång is an American ambient band with strong ties to the post-rock, experimental rock and heavy metal genres. The band formed in 2005 in Downingtown, Pennsylvania. Vindensång was originally the solo project of front-man Jeffrey Neblock, but has since incorporated new members. The band seeks to "capture and reproduce atmosphere and emotion" in their music.

== History ==
=== Formation and instrumental period (2005–2007) ===
In early 2005, the band was formed as the solo project of Jeffrey Neblock. Soon after the conception of the band, material for the demo release Themes of Snow and Sorrow was written and recorded.

The band's sound began as instrumental ambient that incorporated elements such as piano and synthesizers, as well as frequently used sampling and effects.

=== Terminus: Rebirth in Eight Parts... and live performance (2008–2011) ===
Terminus: Rebirth in Eight Parts... marked a transitional point for the band: they had begun to incorporate vocals and a wider array of influences into their music. Terminus: Rebirth in Eight Parts... features vocals used to create atmosphere, as well as some more prominent vocal parts. The sound of the album has been described as a blurry mixture of styles that is "hard to classify into one genre". The album is influenced by dark ambient, drone, neofolk, and black metal. The production quality of the album and use of sound manipulation is a major part of its atmosphere, and at times individual instruments and sound sources are difficult to discern.

With the release of Terminus: Rebirth in Eight Parts... on 16 December 2008, the band performed live for the first time, holding a small CD release party at the Strand Theatre in Lakewood, NJ.

On 14 August 2010, Vindensång performed in Philadelphia, Pennsylvania at The Rotunda to celebrate the 5th anniversary of the formation of the band. This show also featured Canadian neofolk act Musk Ox and Belgian ambient project Sequences.

In March 2011, Vindensång supported Agalloch on their Marrow of the Spirit tour in Baltimore, MD and Cambridge, MA.

=== Second Full-Length and Upcoming Works (2012) ===
As of October 2011, the band announced that they had entered the studio to record their second full-length album, and that they expect to be finished sometime in early 2012.

On 31 May 2012, the band announced that a new album, titled Alpha, was set for release in September 2012, but was later delayed until 2014.

== Style and influences ==
Because their style tends to blend many different genres and instruments simultaneously, Vindensång has been described as "hard to classify into one genre". Jeffrey Neblock has described the band's sound as "ambient-rock".

The members of Vindensång have stated, "all that we create can be interpreted as the embodiment of our spirituality, and all that we create is representative of our growing understanding of both ourselves and of the living universe that encompasses us". They also express that the band was "formed under the premises that nature is sacred", and that all of their music will "appropriately represent the sacredness of the natural world".

Jeffrey Neblock has stated that one of the goals of the band is "to preserve spirituality in music—not [to make] religious music, but rather music with spirit and music for the spirit".

The members of the band have expressed that they identify most with Pantheism, and they are influenced and inspired by metaphysics and mythology.

== Members ==
- Jeffrey Neblock – vocals, guitar, keyboards, synthesizer, drums, percussion (2005–present)
- Don Hussar – guitar, keyboards, electronics, programming (2008–present)
- Doug Fisk – bass guitar (2010–present)

== Discography ==
=== Albums ===
- Terminus: Rebirth in Eight Parts... (2008)
- Alpha (2014)

=== Other releases ===
- Themes of Snow and Sorrow demo (2006)
- The Descent of Man EP (2008)
- Der Wanderer über dem Nebelmeer compilation (2010)
