= The Sense Apparatus =

Studio album by Frantic Bleep
- Released: February 8, 2005 (The End Records); February 14, 2005 (Elitist Records)
- Recorded: 2003–2004
- Genres: Avant-garde metal, progressive metal
- Length: 41:26
- Producer: Patrick Scantlebury

Frantic Bleep chronology
Fluctuadmission (2002)	The Sense Apparatus (2005)

Professional ratings
Review scores
Source	Rating
Allmusic	4/5 stars
Blabbermouth	6.5/10
Chronicles of Chaos	7.5/10
Rock Hard	7.5/10
Heavymetal.dk	6/10
Scream Magazine	2/6 stars
Noise.fi	4/5 stars

The Sense Apparatus is the first album by Frantic Bleep.

Drums were recorded at Huset; guitars were recorded at Breidablikk; vocals recorded at Engelaug & Knapper; and bass, overdubs and additional vocals were recorded at Tora Bora Studios. All engineering, producing and mixing were done by guitarist, Patrick Scantlebury. Mixed at Tora Bora Studios in September 2004 and mastered by Tom Kvålsvoll at Strype Audio on October 12, 2004. All lyrics are by Paul Mozart Bjørke. Cover art is by Christian Ruud.

== Track listing ==
1. "A Survey" (Scantlebury) – 1:19
2. "The Expulsion" (Scantlebury) – 5:04
3. "Sins of Omission" (Scantlebury) – 5:12
4. "…But a Memory" (Scantlebury) – 3:52
5. "Mausolos" (Scantlebury) – 4:38
6. "Curtainraiser" (Scantlebury, Sundstrom) – 5:47
7. "Mandaughter" (Scantlebury, Sundstrom) – 5:48
8. "Nebulous Termini" (Scantlebury) – 6:22
9. "Cone" (Scantlebury) – 3:24

== Credits ==
- Patrick Scantlebury - Lead guitar, synthesizers, production, engineering, mixing
- Eywin Sundstrom - guitar
- Stein Erik Svendheim - drums
- Paul Mozart Bjørke - vocals, bass
- Daniel Solheim - lead vocals on "Sins of Omission"
- Agnete M. Kirkevaag - backing vocals
- Kjetil Foseid - lead vocals on "Curtainraiser"
- Odd E. Ebbesen - backing vocals
- Per Øyvind Bjerknes - backing vocals
