= Amber Asylum =

- Origin: United States
- Genres: Neoclassical dark wave; dark ambient; avant-garde metal
- Labels: Profound Lore Records (present); Release Entertainment (1997–2000)
- Website: www.amberasylum.com

Amber Asylum is a highly variable San Francisco-based music group that serves as a platform for composer, singer, and multi-instrumentalist Kris Force. The current lineup of Amber Asylum includes, in addition to Force, Fern Lee Alberts (Deathgrave), Sarah Rosalena Brady, and Becky Hawk (Laudanum). Other members and performers have included Steve Von Till (Neurosis), Annabel Lee, Martha Burns, long-time collaborator Jackie Perez Gratz (Grayceon/Giant Squid/Asunder), Erica Stoltz (Lost Goat, Sanhedrin), Wendy Farina, Lorraine Rath (The Gault/Worm Ouroboros), Sarah Schaffer (The Gault/Weakling), John Cobbet (Hammers of Misfortune/Ludicra, Vhol), Eric Wood (Man Is The Bastard, Bastard Noise), Leila Abdul-Rauf (Saros, Vastum, Hammers of Misfortune, Bastard Noise, Ionophore), Chiyo Nukaga (Noothgrush/Graves At Sea), Andrew Veskoukis (Akphaezya) and Sigrid Sheie (Hammers of Misfortune, Vhol).

Amber Asylum's music is generally within the neoclassical or dark ambient genres, and tends towards the romantic, introspective, and brooding. Violin and cello are the dominant instruments.

== Discography ==
=== Albums ===
- Frozen in Amber (1996, Elfenblut/Misanthropy) (reissued 2003, Neurot Recordings)
- The Natural Philosophy of Love (1997, Relapse Records)
- Songs of Sex and Death (1999, Relapse Records)
- The Supernatural Parlour Collection (2000, Relapse Records)
- GardenOfLoveAutonomySuiteStillPoint 10" vinyl EP, (2005, self-released)
- Garden of Love EP, (2006, Paradigms Recordings)
- Still Point (2007, Profound Lore Records)
- Bitter River (2009, Profound Lore Records)
- Sin Eater (2015, Prophecy Productions)
- Anthology 1995-2015 (2015, Prophecy Productions)
- Breaker of Rings/Blood Witch split with Völur (2019, Prophecy Productions)
- Ruby Red (2025, Prophecy Productions)
