= The Silence of Forgotten Landscapes =

Video by Agalloch
- Released: 2009
- Recorded: Biebob in Vosselaar, Belgium
- Genres: Folk metal, doom metal
- Label: Shiver Records
- Directors: Juan Mosqueda and John Haughm

Agalloch chronology
The Demonstration Archive (2008)	The Silence of Forgotten Landscapes (2009)	Marrow of the Spirit (2010)

The Silence of Forgotten Landscapes is a 2009 live DVD by American metal band Agalloch. It features a 2008 performance by the band at the Biebob venue in Vosselaar, Belgium. It was co-directed by Juan Mosqueda and Agalloch frontman John Haughm.

== Production ==
=== Haughm's illness ===
The idea to film a performance for a DVD release was sprung on the band very suddenly during their 2008 European tour. Haughm was ill with pneumonia during the tour, and on the evening of the Belgian performance he was feeling particularly unwell. He described his state as like "a bad hangover complete with hallucinations" and that he was singing "with a throat that felt like it was on fire." The band contemplated canceling the performance but Haughm decided instead to "take it like a man and do it," and during the performance he hid his coughing behind his hair.

Following the Vosselaar performance, Haughm traveled to Germany and visited the Externsteine with some friends and a group of traveling flutists and percussionists they had met earlier. They built a fire and stayed late into the evening, with the flutists and percussionists playing their music while Haughm relaxed. Haughm described it as "one of the most amazing spiritual experiences I have ever had," and the following day his illness was gone. This experience was what inspired Haughm to write the song "The Watcher's Monolith," which was included on their fourth album, Marrow of the Spirit.

=== Technical difficulties ===
Aside from Haughm's illness, the band had problems with the amps that were on the stage and issues with bleed-through in the microphones, which was corrected in post-production. The decision was made to release the film in black and white because the color footage was not usable; the transfers were presented to the band in a format that was incompatible with the editor's software, though Haughm said that he felt the "1930s silent film" aesthetic worked well.

Haughm also felt that the Belgian show was ill-suited for the DVD release because they did not have their characteristic stage props (deer skulls, tree stumps etc.), as they were not able to bring those items on the plane to Europe. The band had also requested fog machines for the stage but did not get them.

Despite these problems, Haughm said that they aimed to maintain as much of an untouched live recording possible, and that the quality of the DVD performance is "95% true to the performance that night." He said that they made the best of the situation, though in the future he hopes to have the band organize everything themselves if they decide to release another live DVD.

== Changes to arrangements of songs ==
Agalloch's songs (especially the songs from Pale Folklore and The Mantle) are known for their complex arrangements, featuring acoustic guitars and other folk instruments, and because of this, the band had to simplify the songs for their live shows. Most of the songs featured on The Silence of Forgotten Landscapes (such as "Dead Winter Days" and "I Am the Wooden Doors") simply have clean electric guitars playing the parts that were originally played on acoustic guitars.

The song that received the most noticeable modification was "In the Shadow of Our Pale Companion" (from The Mantle). On the album version, the bridge of the song is slowed down from the rest of the track and features mostly acoustic guitars, with the lyrics (beginning with "I walked down to a river...") sung clean. For the live version, this section was instead sped up and featured more metal elements, and the lyrics were shrieked as opposed to sung. It was also noteworthy for being the only song to feature guitarist Don Anderson accompanying Haughm on vocals.

In recent years, the band has played the "album version" of the song during live shows, as in a July 28, 2012 performance in Springfield, Virginia.

== Release ==
The DVD was released on October 10, 2009 by Shiver Records. An extensive interview with Haughm, Anderson and bassist Jason William Walton was included as a bonus feature. Other bonus features included a production sketch for the "Not Unlike the Waves" music video (which ultimately was not used in the final version of the video), and photo galleries.

== Songs ==
No.	Title	Length
1.	"Limbs"	10:45
2.	"Falling Snow"	8:54
3.	"As Embers Dress the Sky"	4:33
4.	"Dead Winter Days"	7:11
5.	"I Am the Wooden Doors"	5:36
6.	"In the Shadow of Our Pale Companion"	12:11
7.	"Not Unlike the Waves"	9:41
8.	"Our Fortress Is Burning... II - Bloodbirds"	11:19
