= Frantic Bleep =

Norwegian progressive metal band

- Origin: Norway
- Genres: Progressive metal Avant-garde metal
- Years active: 2001–present
- Label: The End Records
- Members: B.P.M. Kirkevaag; Patrick Scantlebury; Lars Gunnar Morastseter; Eywin Sundstrom; Trond Sand
- Website: www.franticbleep.com

Frantic Bleep is a progressive metal band from Norway.

== History ==
Frantic Bleep was founded in November 2001 in Kongsvinger, Norway. The original instrumentation was Patrick Scantlebury playing guitars and synthesizers, Eywin Sundstrom on guitars and Karl Arthur Renstrøm on the drums. In November 2002, they released the four-track demo Fluctuadmission. During the recording, Paul Mozart Bjørke joined the group as a studio member on vocals and bass.

A debut demo, Fluctuadmission received a four out of five rating from Chronicles of Chaos. There was enough positive feedback for the band to receive offers from several labels, including The End Records, with whom they signed in the summer of 2003.

Karl Arthur Renstrøm was replaced by Sten Erik Svendheim in July 2003. The band began recording their debut album, The Sense Apparatus, in October 2003. The recording took an entire year to complete. The album was produced by Patrick Scantlebury with artwork by Christian Ruud. The album also features Kjetil Foseid, Daniel Solheim and Agnete M. Kirkevaag (Madder Mortem) performing various vocal duties. In 2004/2005, Lars Gunnar Morastseter and Trond Sand, previously from the Norwegian Death Metal band The Laughing Man, joined Frantic Bleep. Writing and rehearsals for the second studio album started around the time the band played their first, and so far only, live gig in their hometown of Kongsvinger in August 2005.

As of 2007, the album was announced as being in progress, and had a tentative release date of 2009, but there has been no updates from the band.

== Members ==
=== Current members ===
- Eywin Sundstrom - Bass, Guitars (2001–present)
- Patrick Scantlebury - Guitars, Synthesizers (2001–present)
- Lars Gunnar Morastseter - Guitars (2004–present)
- Trond Sand - Drums (2005–present)
- B.P.M. Kirkevaag - Vocals (2007-present)

=== Former members ===
- Paul Mozart Bjørke - Vocals, Bass (2001–2003, session only)
- Karl Arthur Renstrøm - Drums (2001–2003)
- Sten Erik Svendheim - Drums (2003–2005)
- Kjetil Foseid - Vocals (2004–2007)

== Discography ==
- Fluctuadmission (2002) - demo
- The Sense Apparatus (2005) - LP
