= Odes of Ecstasy =

Greek death metal band founded 1993

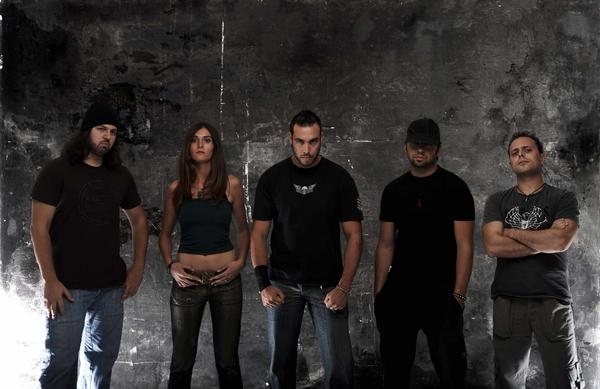
- Odes of Ecstasy'

Background information
- Origin: Greece
- Genres: Symphonic death metal, gothic metal
- Years active: 1993–present
- Labels: The End Records, Independent
- Members: Christina Maniati; Nikos Baltas; Giannis Fasoulakis; Giorgos Pagidas; Nikos Simigiannis; Irini Tsiklou

Odes of Ecstasy is a Greek death metal/gothic metal band formed in 1993 by Dimitris Bikos and Iosif Nikou.

== History ==
The band formed in November 1993. In 1994, Dimitris Panayiotidis joined the band on guitar, and in December 1995 they released a promo tape containing one song, "Theogony."

In the summer of 1996 they recorded their first demo, Atheistic Emotions, which featured vocals by Christina Maniati. The demo includes three symphonic death metal songs, a cover of Black Sabbath's "Paranoid," and an ambient tune with only female vocals, keyboards, and electric guitars. The specific release was announced as the "Promo of the Month by the Greek Metal Hammer magazine. Following the release of the demo, Dimitris Panayiotidis left the band for military service and was replaced by Nikos Baltas.

In 1997, they released a single-song promo entitled Words of Insanity, which gave them the opportunity to sign with the American label The End Records, which released their first official album, Embossed Dream in Four Acts. The sound of this album is best characterized as death metal featuring brutal male and operatic female vocals, and influences from classical music. The second release of the band came in 2000, Deceitful Melody.

After that, the band came to a standstill for several years due to many line-up changes, caused mainly by the obligatory military service of some of the band’s members. In 2004 the band formed again with a new line-up and a different musical orientation. The band played several shows to promote the news songs from their upcoming release, the self-titled Odes Of Ecstasy promo (2006) which had five songs. A full album was finished in October 2007.

YouTube links:

One with the Darkness https://www.youtube.com/watch?v=FAd6_3XS0Mo&list=PL7A7FD86EA83311DC&index=8

The Floating City of Sun https://www.youtube.com/watch?v=LCn7sjKMgqo&list=PL7A7FD86EA83311DC&index=11

== Band members ==
=== Former members ===
- Iosif Nikou - bass
- Dimitris Bikos - vocals, guitar
- Savvas Dandoulakis - keyboards
- Christina Maniati - vocals
- Irini Tsiklou - keyboards
- Giannis Fasoulakis - backing vocals, guitar
- Giorgos Pagidas - bass
- Dimitris Panayiotidis - guitar

=== Current members ===
- Nikos Baltas - vocals, guitar
- Nikos Simigiannis - drums

== Discography ==
- Theogony (Promo, 1995)
- Atheistic Emotions (Demo, 1996)
- Faithless/Never Again (Split with Nocturnal Howling, Daimonion, 1997)
- Words Of Insanity (Promo, 1997)
- Embossed Dream in Four Acts (Album, The End, 1998)
- Deceitful Melody (Album, The End, 2000)
- Odes Of Ecstasy promo (2006)
- Odes Of Ecstasy (2007)
