= Marrow of the Spirit =

Studio album by Agalloch
- Released: November 23, 2010
- Recorded: June–August 2010
- Studio: Audible Alchemy, Portland, Oregon
- Genre: Black metal, folk metal, doom metal, post-metal
- Length: 65:33
- Label: Profound Lore
- Producer: Steven Wray Lobdell

Agalloch chronology
Ashes Against the Grain (2006)	Marrow of the Spirit (2010)	Faustian Echoes (2012)

Marrow of the Spirit is the fourth studio album by American metal band Agalloch, released on November 23, 2010.

== Production ==
Marrow of the Spirit marked a change in record labels for Agalloch. Their first three albums and EPs were released by The End Records, but after their contract was completed with the release of Ashes Against the Grain in 2006, the band opted not to renew it. Marrow of the Spirit was released by Profound Lore Records, which had also released the first two Agalloch albums on vinyl in 2005. It was the first album to feature Aesop Dekker (of Ludicra) on drums, replacing Chris Greene.

The band felt that their previous album, Ashes Against the Grain, sounded too polished, and opted for a more raw sound for Marrow of the Spirit, saying that it felt more "alive and real". The album thus was recorded entirely on vintage analog equipment. Recording took place at Audible Alchemy Studios in Portland, Oregon with Steven Wray Lobdell producing.

== Release ==
On October 29, 2010, the track "The Watcher's Monolith" was released on the music website Stereogum, accompanied by an interview with John Haughm. The track "Ghosts of the Midwinter Fires" was released on November 1.

The full album was released on November 23, 2010.

== Reception ==
Professional ratings
Review scores
Source	Rating
About.com	4.5/5 stars
AllMusic	5/5 stars
Pitchfork	8.5/10
PopMatters	9/10
Rock Hard	9/10
Sputnikmusic	(staff review 1) 2.5/5 (staff review 2) 4/5

The album was named one of NPR's Top 50 albums of 2010 and listed at No. 1 on Decibel's list of the 40 best albums of 2010. PopMatters listed Marrow of the Spirit as the best metal album of 2010.

== Track listing ==
No.	Title	Length
1.	"They Escaped the Weight of Darkness"	3:41
2.	"Into the Painted Grey"	12:25
3.	"The Watcher's Monolith"	11:46
4.	"Black Lake Niðstång"	17:34
5.	"Ghosts of the Midwinter Fires"	9:40
6.	"To Drown"	10:27
Total length:		65:33

Bonus tracks (limited 2010 tour edition)
No.	Title	Writer(s)	Length
7.	"Nihil Totem"	Jeffery Neblock	6:49
8.	"The Weight of Darkness" ("They Escaped the Weight of Darkness" remix)		4:21
Total length:			76:43

== Personnel ==
Agalloch

- John Haughm – vocals, acoustic and electric guitars
- Don Anderson – acoustic and electric guitars
- Jason William Walton – bass
- Aesop Dekker – drums

Guest musicians

- Jackie Perez Gratz – cello on "They Escaped the Weight of Darkness" and "To Drown"
- Steven Wray Lobdell – backing vocals on "The Watcher's Monolith"
- Jeffrey Neblock – piano on "The Watcher's Monolith" and field recordings on "They Escaped the Weight of Darkness", "The Watcher's Monolith", "Black Lake Niðstång" and "To Drown"
- Nathan Carson – Moog MG-1, Moog Opus-3, vibraphone and glockenspiel on "Black Lake Niðstång"
- Veleda Thorsson – petrified bone, glass and metal sheet percussion on "To Drown"

Artwork

- Mark Thompson – cover art
- Veleda Thorsson – photography
- John Haughm – design
