= Cruciamentum =

British death metal band

- Origin: United Kingdom
- Genres: Death metal
- Years active: 2007–present
- Label: Profound Lore
- Members: C.E. D.L. D.R. M.H.
- Past members: S.H. D.T. M.L. A.K. O.S.

Cruciamentum are an English death metal band formed in 2007. The members originate from the cities of Stoke-on-Trent, Birmingham, and London in the United Kingdom. The band was created as a quartet with several lineup changes during their career. Cruciamentum has so far released one full-length EP, a split 7-inch with Vasaeleth, a demo recording, and two albums.

== Members ==
- C.E. – Lead vocals, Bass
- D.L. – Guitars, Keyboards, Backing vocals
- D.R. – Guitars
- M.H. – Drums

== Former members ==
- S.H. – bass
- D.T. – drums
- M.L. – guitar
- A.K. – vocals
- O.S. – vocals
- B.C. – bass, vocals
- D.B.–H. – drums
- R.C. – guitar

== Discography ==
=== Studio albums ===
- Charnel Passages (2015)
- Obsidian Refractions (2023)

=== Other ===
- Convocation of Crawling Chaos (2009) – EP
- Eroding Chaos unto Ascendant Flesh – split with Vasaeleth (2011)
- Engulfed in Desolation (2011) – EP
