= More Constant Than the Gods =

Studio album by SubRosa
- Released: September 17, 2013
- Recorded: March–May 2013 in Salt Lake City
- Genre: Doom metal, sludge metal, funeral doom metal
- Length: 67:34
- Label: Profound Lore Records

SubRosa chronology
No Help for the Mighty Ones (2011)	More Constant Than the Gods (2013)	For This We Fought the Battle of Ages (2016)

More Constant Than the Gods is the third album by Salt Lake City-based doom metal band SubRosa. It was SubRosa's second album released via Profound Lore Records.

== Background ==
Glyn Smyth of Stag & Serpent created the album artwork, having also done so for SubRosa's previous album, No Help for the Mighty Ones. The artwork, which depicts a female personification of Death, was inspired by vocalist and guitarist Rebecca Vernon's mother, who died in 2007.

After the album was recorded in Salt Lake City, Magnus "Devo" Andersson performed mixing and mastering throughout June and July 2013 at Endarker Studios in Sweden.

To promote the album after it was released, SubRosa toured North America with bands such as Samothrace, The Atlas Moth, and Boris. Their tour with Samothrace was cut short in Sacramento after a vehicle break-in resulted in equipment and multiple instruments stolen.

Subsequent festivals SubRosa performed at include the Ruins of Intolerance Festival in Prague, Czech Republic on June 26, 2014 and the Psycho California Festival in May 2015.

== Critical reception ==
Professional ratings
Review scores
Source	Rating
AllMusic	4.5/5 stars
Dead Rhetoric	8.5/10
Invisible Oranges	(Positive)
Metal Injection	8/10
Pitchfork	8.3/10
Scene Point Blank	9.4/10
Sputnikmusic	4.3/5
Treble Zine	(Positive)

The album received generally positive reviews from critics. Grayson Haver described it as folk-influenced, noting the album's heaviness and use of violin and referring to its songs as "Leadbelly kicked forward several decades". J. Andrew of Metal Injection stated that the album's sound "evokes such dark and strong imagery, with a landscape both heavy and doom-laden, but with an almost 19th-Century-like aesthetic." In 2014, Decibel Magazine ranked the album as #88 in its Top 100 Doom Metal Albums of All Time list. In 2019, they ranked the album #35 in their list of Top 100 Greatest Metal Albums of the 2010s.

== Track listing ==
No.	Title	Length
1.	"The Usher"	14:17
2.	"Ghosts of a Dead Empire"	11:04
3.	"Cosey Mo"	7:30
4.	"Fat of the Ram"	12:18
5.	"Affliction"	9:49
6.	"No Safe Harbor"	12:34

== Personnel ==
Credits adapted from album liner notes.

=== Band ===
- Rebecca Vernon – guitars, vocals, vibraphone on "The Usher", hammered dulcimer, piano
- Sarah Pendleton – violin, vocals, noise interludes
- Kim Pack – violin, vocals, cello on "Ghosts of a Dead Empire", noise interludes
- Christian Creek – bass
- Andy Patterson – drums

=== Additional musicians ===
- David Payne – clarinet on "Fat of the Ram"
- Jason McFarland – vocals on "The Usher"
- Bill Frost – guitar on "Ghosts of a Dead Empire"
- April Clayton – flute on "No Safe Harbor"

=== Production and artwork ===
- Magnus "Devo" Andersson – mixing, mastering, noise arrangement
- Glyn Smyth – album artwork and layout
