= Grayceon =

American progressive metal band

- Origin: San Francisco, California, United States
- Genres: Progressive metal
- Years active: 2005–present
- Labels: Profound Lore, Vendlus, Flenser
- Members: Jackie Perez Gratz; Max Doyle; Zack Farwell
- Website: http://www.grayceon.com/

Grayceon is a three-piece metal band from San Francisco. They were formed in 2005. They were licensed on the label Vendlus Records from 2005 to 2009 and are currently licensed on the label Profound Lore Records. Their debut album Grayceon was released in 2007 and their second release This Grand Show came out in 2008.

A 7" split with Giant Squid was also released on The End Records in late 2007.

Grayceon consists of Jackie Perez Gratz on electric cello/vocals, Max Doyle on guitar/vocals, and Zack Farwell on drums. Gratz is a member of Giant Squid, was a core member of Amber Asylum from 1997 to 2007, and is the guest performer on albums by bands such as Agalloch, Asunder, Neurosis, Today Is the Day, Matmos and Two Gallants.

Grayceon's third album All We Destroy was released March 1, 2011 on Profound Lore Records.

== Discography ==
Studio albums

- Grayceon (2007)
- This Grand Show (2008)
- All We Destroy (2011)
- IV (2018)
- Mothers Weavers Vultures (2020)
- Then The Darkness (2025)

EPs

- Pearl and the End of Days (2013)

Splits

- The West (2007) (with Giant Squid)
