= Still point =

Still Point may refer to:

- The Still Point (film), a 1986 Australian film
- The Still Point a 2010 novel by British author Amy Sackville
- The Still Point: A Beginner's Guide to Zen Meditation, a book by Zen Buddhist author John Daido Loori
- Still Point (Amber Asylum album), a 2007 album by American experimental band Amber Asylum
- Stillpoint, a 1973 album by Australian progressive rock band Madder Lake
- Stillpoint, a 2023 album by American pianist Awadagin Pratt
