= Faustian Echoes =

EP by Agalloch
- Released: June 26, 2012
- Recorded: 2012
- Studios: Jackpot Studio, Portland, OR
- Genres: Black metal, folk metal
- Length: 21:34
- Label: Licht von Dämmerung Arthouse

Agalloch chronology
Marrow of the Spirit (2010)	Faustian Echoes (2012)	The Serpent & the Sphere (2014)

Professional ratings
Review scores
Source	Rating
Pitchfork	(6.5/10)

Faustian Echoes is an EP by American metal band Agalloch, released on June 26, 2012 by Agalloch's own label Licht von Dämmerung Arthouse. It is actually a single, two-part song over 21 minutes in length, making it the longest song Agalloch ever wrote. The song is based on Johann Wolfgang von Goethe's play Faust.

Regarding the theme of Faustian Echoes, Agalloch vocalist/guitarist John Haughm said, "The lyrics are taken directly from an English translation of Goethe's Faust. We used select phrases and film samples to create the narrative which, together, outlines the backbone of the original story." The film samples are from Jan Svankmajer's 1994 film Faust.

Agalloch released Faustian Echoes in conjunction with their summer 2012 North American tour, making it first available via streaming and digital download. Vinyl and CD versions were only available at the shows during the tour, and via mail order after the tour.

The cover art features the etching Faust Lisant (Faust Reading) by Salvador Dalí.

== Track listing ==
No.	Title	Length
1.	"Faustian Echoes"	21:34
Total length:		21:34

== Personnel ==
- John Haughm – vocals, guitar
- Don Anderson – guitar, mellotron
- Jason William Walton – bass
- Aesop Dekker – drums
