= Tomorrow Will Never Come =

EP by Agalloch
- Released: May 27, 2003
- Genre: Neofolk
- Length: 7:32
- Label: The End

Agalloch chronology
| The Mantle (2002) | Tomorrow Will Never Come (2003) | The Grey (2004) |

Tomorrow Will Never Come is a 2003 EP by American metal band Agalloch. It was released by The End Records in a limited edition of 500 copies, hand-initialed by bassist Jason William Walton.

== Track listing ==
| No. | Title | Writer(s) | Length |
|---|---|---|---|
| 1. | "The Death of Man" (Version III) | John Haughm | 2:53 |
| 2. | "Tomorrow Will Never Come" | Don Anderson, Ty Brubaker | 4:39 |
| Total length: | | | 7:32 |

== Information ==
When asked about the title track ("Tomorrow Will Never Come") during a lecture at the University of Victoria, Agalloch guitarist Don Anderson said:

"It’s a song that is close to me in many ways. The idea was developed during a time when I was very interested in schizophrenia and the mentally ill. The sample was taken from a documentary I watched whilst taking a 'domain of the sciences & society' course at the university. We were studying medicine and the mentally ill. We watched this video (from the prof's personal library) and I was incredibly moved by the son's conversation with his father. I wanted to use it for Sculptured originally, but this track really provided a better opportunity for it."
