= Agalloch =

American extreme metal band

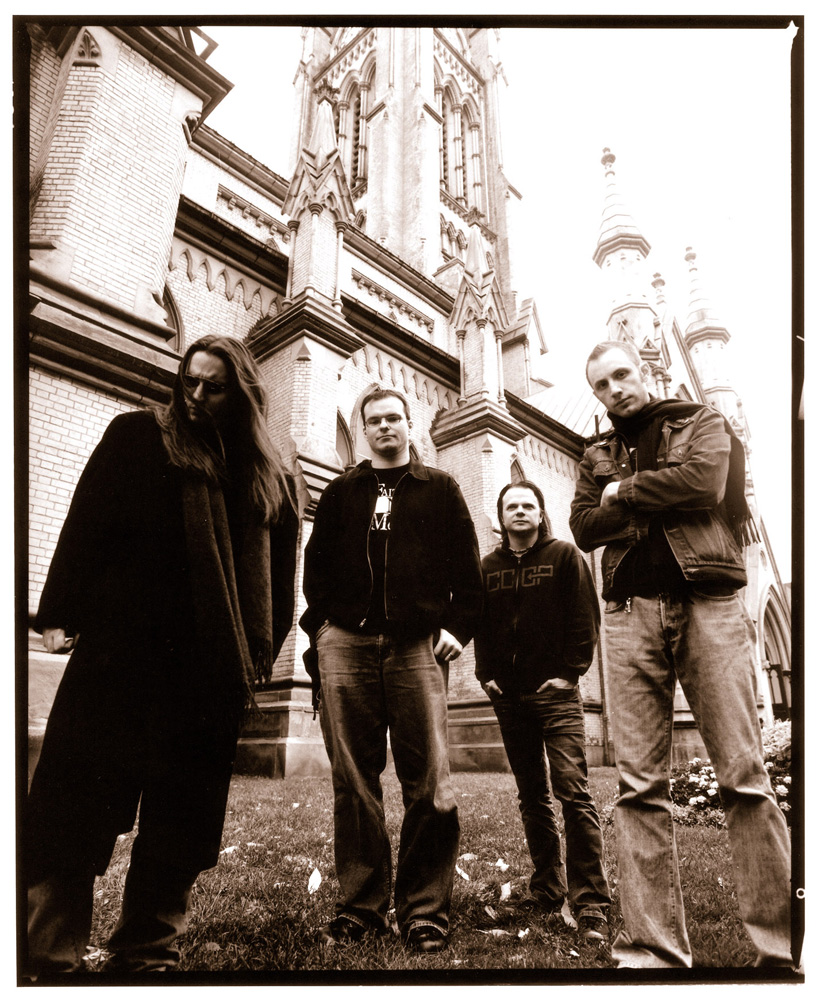
- Agalloch in 2005

Background information
- Origin: Portland, Oregon, U.S.
- Genres: Black metal; folk metal; doom metal; post-metal
- Works: Discography
- Years active: 1995–2016, 2023–present
- Labels: The End, Profound Lore, Vendlus, Licht von Dämmerung Arthouse, Eisenwald Tonschmiede, Viva Hate Records
- Members: John Haughm; Don Anderson; Jason William Walton
- Past members: Shane Breyer; Chris Greene; Aesop Dekker

Agalloch (/ˈæɡəlɒx/) is an American extreme metal band from Portland, Oregon. It was formed in 1995 by frontman John Haughm, with longterm members Don Anderson (guitar) and Jason William Walton (bass) joining after. The band's sound is rooted in atmospheric black metal, with characteristics of post-metal, folk metal and doom metal.

Agalloch released albums via The End Records, such as The Mantle (2002) and Ashes Against the Grain (2006). The release of Marrow of the Spirit (2010) on Profound Lore Records increased their exposure, earning acclaim from publications such as Pitchfork.

The band split in 2016 because Haughm was the only member who wanted to tour full-time. Agalloch reunited in 2023 "with the intent of playing limited shows."

== History ==
=== Formation and early years (1995–1997) ===
The name “Agalloch” refers to the resinous wood of the agarwood (Aquilaria agallocha), which Haughm found in an old dictionary when looking for a word that encapsulated “the aesthetic of wood smoke on a winter night.” Haughm and keyboardist Shane Breyer founded the band. In early 1996, the duo began composing material. Guitarist Don Anderson joined the band that summer to refine songs that were recorded that autumn for release as the band's first demo tape, From Which of This Oak. This recording displayed a black metal influence and included material that would appear on subsequent albums. Shortly after recording, bassist Jason William Walton joined the lineup.

=== Pale Folklore and Of Stone, Wind, and Pillor (1998–2001) ===
In 1998, the trio recorded the demo tape Promo 1998 for labels. The End Records offered them a contract, resulting in the 1999 release of their debut full-length album, Pale Folklore. Reworking several earlier demo tracks, the album featured less black metal and more neofolk elements and neoclassical interludes. After recording was completed, Breyer departed the band due to a lack of interest in music.

After a hiatus, the band released the EP of unreleased material from 1998 to 2001 Of Stone, Wind, and Pillor, with more neoclassical and experimental elements. The EP included a cover of "Kneel to the Cross" by neofolk band Sol Invictus that would later be released on Sol Lucet Omnibus, French label Cynerfierrd's tribute compilation to Sol Invictus.

=== The Mantle (2002–2005) ===
During 2001 and early 2002, Agalloch recorded The Mantle, featuring the post-rock influence of Godspeed You! Black Emperor, with tracks "In The Shadow of Our Pale Companion" and "You Were But A Ghost In My Arms" displaying a black metal/post-rock hybrid. This album earned the band interviews with mainstream magazines.

Following the release of The Mantle, Agalloch played their first show on March 6, 2003 in Portland, followed by an additional shows in March and a US West Coast tour in May.

Two subsequent records, the Tomorrow Will Never Come 7" single (issued by The End's Infinite Vinyl Series in 2003) and The Grey (released by Vendlus Records in 2004), showcased a more experimental side, featuring remixed and reworked versions of songs from The Mantle and a new, post-rock-influenced title track on the B-side of Tomorrow Will Never Come. Agalloch performed shows on the North American East Coast in 2004.

A nature-themed split 10" picture disc single with Finnish band Nest was released in 2004, showcasing a collaborative, neofolk effort on the A-side. The Nest track, an electronic, percussion-heavy effort, included vocals and guitars by Haughm and Anderson.

Double vinyl reissues of The Mantle and Pale Folklore were released in 2005 in limited wooden boxes, with new artwork for both albums, to commemorate the band's single live performance of 2005 at the Day of the Equinox music festival held in Toronto on October 14, 2005.

=== Ashes Against the Grain and The White (2006–2008) ===
Ashes Against the Grain, the band's third full-length album, was released on August 8, 2006 by The End Records, featuring less of The Mantle's acoustic guitars and elements of post-rock and more emphasis on electric guitars and metal elements, giving the album a different sound than previous releases.

On previous albums, Haughm played drums, but he wished to concentrate on songwriting and guitar, so Chris Greene (who had joined the band for live shows beginning in 2003) played drums on all Ashes Against the Grain tracks except "Falling Snow" and "Not Unlike the Waves". After a 2006 European tour, Greene exited the band, replaced by Aesop Dekker of Ludicra.

Ashes Against the Grain completed the band's contract with The End Records, and in April 2008, Agalloch decided against renewing the contract.

On February 29, 2008, Agalloch released The White, the second half (and stylistic opposite) of their two-part EP release for Vendlus. As with The Grey, the album was limited to 2,000 copies. The White collected dark folk/ambient work from 2004 to 2007, with a sound more akin to the acoustic guitar approach of The Mantle. The tracks "The Isle of Summer", "Sowilo Rune" and "Summerisle Reprise" were based on themes from the 1973 film The Wicker Man, with all three tracks utilizing samples from the film. The track "Birch White" borrowed its lyrics from a song by A.S.J. Tessimond titled "Birch Tree". "Sowilo Rune" was posted on Agalloch's official MySpace page roughly two months before the album was released.

=== The Demonstration Archive and Marrow of the Spirit (2008–2013) ===
On August 4, 2008, Agalloch released a compilation album called The Demonstration Archive 1996–1998 on Licht von Dämmerung Arthouse, collecting material recorded between 1996 and 1998 including the From Which of This Oak and Promo 1998 demos and the then-unreleased Of Stone, Wind, and Pillor EP.

On August 12, 2009, From Which of This Oak was re-released as a picture disk by German label Eisenwald Tonschmiede.

Agalloch recorded a track, "Nebelmeer", with German artist Mathias Grassow for the compilation album Der Wanderer über dem Nebelmeer (English: "Wanderer Above the Sea of Fog") released by Pest Productions in March 2010.

A two-CD compilation album named The Compendium Archive 1996 – 2006 was released by Licht von Dämmerung Arthouse on March 20, 2010, limited to 250 copies. The album was intended to be sold exclusively at two shows played by the band in Romania during March 2010; however, 85 unsold copies were subsequently sold on eBay by the band during May 2010. Disc one was an exact copy of The Demonstration Archive, while disc two contained material recorded during the 2000–2006 period and previously released on Of Stone, Wind, and Pillor, Tomorrow Will Never Come and the split with Nest, as well as alternate versions of tracks from The Mantle and Ashes Against the Grain and some previously unreleased tracks.

On June 7, 2010, Agalloch posted a blog entry on MySpace stating that the fourth album would be released on the Canadian record label Profound Lore Records, which had also released the first two Agalloch albums on vinyl in 2005. The band stated that the album would be recorded throughout June and July 2010 but did not list the album's title or release date.

On September 21, 2010, Agalloch officially announced the title of their fourth full-length as Marrow of the Spirit. The album was released in mid-November on Profound Lore.

In an interview with Exclaim! magazine, in regards to the production of Marrow of the Spirit, Haughm stated, "We wanted an album that sounded more alive and real....Our last album was a bit too mechanized, too polished, and that kind of disturbed us. So we brought back the older methods that we had utilized on our demos and first album to try and get back a more organic feeling."

A tour-only edition of Marrow of the Spirit was issued by Licht von Dämmerung/Profound Lore, including a CD, photo cards and a bonus 7" featuring two tracks: "Nihil Totem" and "The Weight of Darkness".

On June 26, 2012, Agalloch released the Faustian Echoes EP on Licht von Dämmerung Arthouse, consisting of just one 21-minute-long song (the longest song Agalloch has ever written). Agalloch toured North America in July and August 2012 to support the release.

=== The Serpent & the Sphere (2013–2016) ===
On October 13, 2013, Agalloch stated that they have "a new album in the works". On January 31, 2014, the band announced that The Serpent & the Sphere would be released on May 13 by Profound Lore. Following the US release, it was issued in Germany on May 16 and Europe on May 19. The album featured guest Nathanaël Larochette of Musk Ox on acoustic guitar. Also on May 16, Licht von Dämmerung Arthouse released a 7" vinyl single of album track "Alpha Serpentis (Unukalhai)", credited to Agalloch and Nathanaël Larochette and limited to 350 copies.

=== Breakup and future projects (2016–2023) ===
On May 13, 2016, Agalloch announced that they had disbanded. The announcement came in the form of a Facebook post on the band's official page:

Following 20 years, 5 full-length albums, many tours around the world, and numerous other recordings, John Haughm and the rest of the band (Don Anderson, Jason Walton, and Aesop Dekker) have parted ways. What the future holds for the separate parties remains undetermined. We collectively thank all of our fans across the world. There are also way too many other people to thank who made this band possible. You know who you are.

Anderson said that Haughm secretly trademarked the band name in February and copyrighted live performances to prevent other members from playing Agalloch songs live. While Haughm was always solely responsible for the band's lyrics, image and artwork, Anderson took issue with Haughm also claiming that he was responsible for 80% of the band's music, calling it "an arbitrary lie". The band also disagreed over touring schedules; Haughm wanted to tour full-time while this conflicted with Anderson's schedule as a professor at Westchester Community College, as well as Walton and Dekker's family responsibilities. Haughm himself said tensions within the band worsened once Anderson moved to New York to become a full-time professor in 2014, because the band had to decline several concert opportunities that Haughm wanted to play. Anderson also said that his friendship with Haughm was now over.

On September 16, 2016, Haughm announced the formation of a new band called Pillorian, while Anderson, Walton and Dekker began a new project called Khôrada with vocalist Aaron John Gregory of Giant Squid. Pillorian's debut album, Obsidian Arc, was released on March 10, 2017. Khôrada's debut album, Salt, was released on July 20, 2018.

In a January 2020 interview with Decibel, Anderson indicated that he had mended his friendship with Haughm after three years of interacting only for business purposes.

=== Reunion (2023–present) ===
The three original members of Agalloch reunited in 2023 to "with the intent of playing limited shows." The band was now joined by Hunter Ginn as their new live drummer. Their first show back was on September 9, 2023 at the Balve Cave in Germany during Prophecy Fest, a metal festival hosted by Prophecy Productions. Their first reunion show in the U.S. was at the Crystal Ballroom in their native Portland on September 23. In May 2024, Agalloch played their first East Coast show since 2014 as a last-minute substitution at Maryland Deathfest after My Dying Bride canceled. In June 2025, the band headlined the Fortress Festival in Scarborough, England. This was the band’s first time playing in England since 2015.

== Musical style and influences ==
Agalloch performs a progressive and avant-garde style of folk metal that encompasses an eclectic range of tendencies including neofolk, post-rock, black metal and doom metal.

Common themes in Agalloch's imagery and subject matter are the beauty of nature, winter, melancholy and allusions to ancestral paganism. Don Anderson described Norse mythology as a major influence on the band and said that "heathen culture" was the main inspiration for frontman John Haughm in particular. Anderson said that the band's take on Ralph Waldo Emerson's philosophy could be viewed as a kind of worship of nature, but that no one in the band practiced paganism as a religion.

Agalloch has also used non-traditional instruments, such as a deer skull used as percussion in the song "The Lodge".

In a 1999 Wicked World interview with Haughm and Walton, the band members listed influences including Katatonia, Ulver, The 3rd and the Mortal, Swans and Godspeed You! Black Emperor. In another interview in 2008, Don Anderson cites Nick Cave and the Bad Seeds, Current 93 and Sol Invictus as influences; particularly on their 1999 Pale Folklore album. Cinema has also greatly influenced the band, in an interview with the Metal Rules webzine, filmmakers such as Alejandro Jodorowsky, Jim Jarmusch and Ingmar Bergman were cited as influences. Haughm has also noted an admiration for filmmaker Andrei Tarkovsky. In another interview, Haughm lists Bethlehem, Fields Of The Nephilim, Coil, Arvo Pärt, Death In June, Steve Reich, and Joy Division as influences. He also says that Rush is his "favorite band in the world".

== Members ==
Lineup

- John Haughm − vocals, guitar, drums (formerly of Sculptured, Pillorian) (1995–2016, 2023–present)
- Don Anderson − guitar, keyboards (Sculptured, Nothing, formerly of Darling, formerly of Necropolis) (1996–2016, 2023–present)
- Jason William Walton − bass guitar (Especially Likely Sloth, formerly of Subterranean Masquerade, Sculptured, Nothing, formerly of Susurrus Inanis) (1997–2016, 2023–present)

=== Live members ===
- Hunter Ginn − drums (Sculptured, Canvas Solaris, Fool's Game) (2023–present)

Former members

- Shane Breyer − keyboards (formerly of Susurrus Inanis) (1996–1998)
- Chris Greene − drums (2004–2007)
- Aesop Dekker − drums (formerly of Ludicra, Worm Ouroboros, VHÖL) (2007–2016)

== Discography ==
=== Studio albums ===
List of studio albums, with selected chart positions
Title	Album details	Peak chart positions		
Title	Album details	US Hard Rock	US Heat	US Ind
Pale Folklore	Released: June 6, 1999; Label: The End	—	—	—
The Mantle	Released: August 13, 2002; Label: The End	—	—	—
Ashes Against the Grain	Released: August 8, 2006; Label: The End	—	—	—
Marrow of the Spirit	Released: November 23, 2010; Label: Profound Lore	—	25	—
The Serpent & the Sphere	Released: May 13, 2014; Label: Profound Lore	16	6	46
"—" denotes items that did not chart or were not released in that territory.

=== EPs ===
Title	Details
Of Stone, Wind, and Pillor	Released: May 28, 2001; Label: The End Records
Tomorrow Will Never Come	Released: May 27, 2003; Label: The End Records
The Grey	Released: February 29, 2004; Label: Vendlus Records
The White	Released: February 29, 2008; Label: Vendlus Records
Faustian Echoes	Released: June 26, 2012; Label: Licht von Dämmerung Arthouse

=== Live album ===
Title	Details
The Silence of Forgotten Landscapes	Released: 2008; Label: Shiver Records
