= The Natural Philosophy of Love =

Studio album by Amber Asylum
- Released: May 20, 1997
- Genre: Neoclassical dark wave, dream pop, dark ambient, experimental
- Length: 42:22
- Label: Release (Canada); Relapse (USA)
- Producer: Kris Force, Blaise Smith, Timothy North, Dale Everingham

Amber Asylum chronology
Frozen in Amber (1996)	The Natural Philosophy of Love (1997)	Songs of Sex and Death (1999)

Professional ratings
Review scores
Source	Rating
AllMusic	4.5/5 stars
Chronicles of Chaos	7/10

The Natural Philosophy of Love is the second studio album by the American experimental band Amber Asylum. It was released on May 20, 1997, through Release Records and Relapse Records.

== Critical reception ==
AllMusic wrote: "Essential listening for anyone who wore nothing but black for at least one semester of high school, to be sure, but The Natural Philosophy of Love is so richly detailed and at times spine-tinglingly pretty that it's not just for recovering goths."

== Track listing ==
No.	Title	Writer(s)	Length
1.	"Cupid"	Kris Force, "Martin"	4:09
2.	"Exodus"	Force	7:37
3.	"Looking Glass"	Annabel Lee, Force	5:15
4.	"Song of the Spider War"	Force	4:46
5.	"Jorinda and Joringal"	Gebrüder Grimm, Mika Richard	6:54
6.	"Looking Glass Reprise"	Lee, Force	5:51
7.	"Poppies"	Buffy Sainte-Marie	7:52
Total length:			42:22

== Personnel ==
Amber Asylum

- Kris Force – guitars, vocals, violin, lyrics, arrangement
- Annabel Lee – violin, arrangement
- Martha Burns – cello, arrangement

Additional personnel

- Dale Everingham, Lars Savage, Mack Clark, Ross Yeo – backing vocals (track 1)
- Timothy North – percussion, ambience (tracks 1, 2, 4)
- Blaise Smith – keyboards (track 2)
- Steve Von Till – guitar (tracks 5, 6), eBow (track 6), percussion (track 7)

Production

- William J. Jr. Yurkiewicz – executive production, engineering, mixing, mastering
- Blaise Smith, Dave Everingham – production (tracks 1, 2)
- Timothy North – production (track 3)
- Kris Force – production (tracks 3–7)
- Andy Switzer – editing
