= Of Stone, Wind, and Pillor =

EP by Agalloch
- Released: May 28, 2001
- Recorded: 1998 (1–3), 2000 (5), 2001 (4)
- Genres: Dark ambient, doom metal, folk metal, black metal
- Length: 28:00
- Label: The End Records

Agalloch chronology
Pale Folklore (1999)	Of Stone, Wind, and Pillor (2001)	The Mantle (2002)

Professional ratings
Review scores
Source	Rating
Allmusic	2.5/5 stars
Chronicles of Chaos	7/10

Of Stone, Wind, and Pillor is an EP by American metal band Agalloch. It was originally meant to be released on 7" vinyl in December 1998 by Iron Fist Productions (with only the first three songs), but that did not occur. It was later released in 2001 via The End Records with two additional tracks: "Kneel to the Cross", recorded in 2001, and "A Poem by Yeats", recorded in 2000. This release was limited to 2,500 copies. The cover artwork, Le Cerf Se Voyant Dans L'Eau, was by Gustave Doré.

Lyrics in the song "A Poem by Yeats" have been taken from W. B. Yeats's poem "The Sorrow of Love". "Kneel to the Cross" is a Sol Invictus cover.

== Track listing ==
No.	Title	Lyrics	Music	Length
1.	"Of Stone, Wind, and Pillor"	John Haughm	Haughm, Don Anderson, Jason William Walton	6:59
2.	"Foliorum Viridium" (instrumental)		Shane Breyer	2:43
3.	"Haunting Birds" (instrumental)		Haughm	3:45
4.	"Kneel to the Cross" (Sol Invictus cover)	Tony Wakeford	Wakeford	5:54
5.	"A Poem by Yeats"	W. B. Yeats	Breyer	8:39
Total length:				28:00

== Personnel ==
- John Haughm – vocals, guitar, drums
- Don Anderson – guitar
- Jason William Walton – bass
- Shane Breyer – keyboards
- Gustave Doré – artwork
- Ronn Chick – synthesizer, engineer, mastering, mixing
