= Spectral Wound =

Canadian black metal band

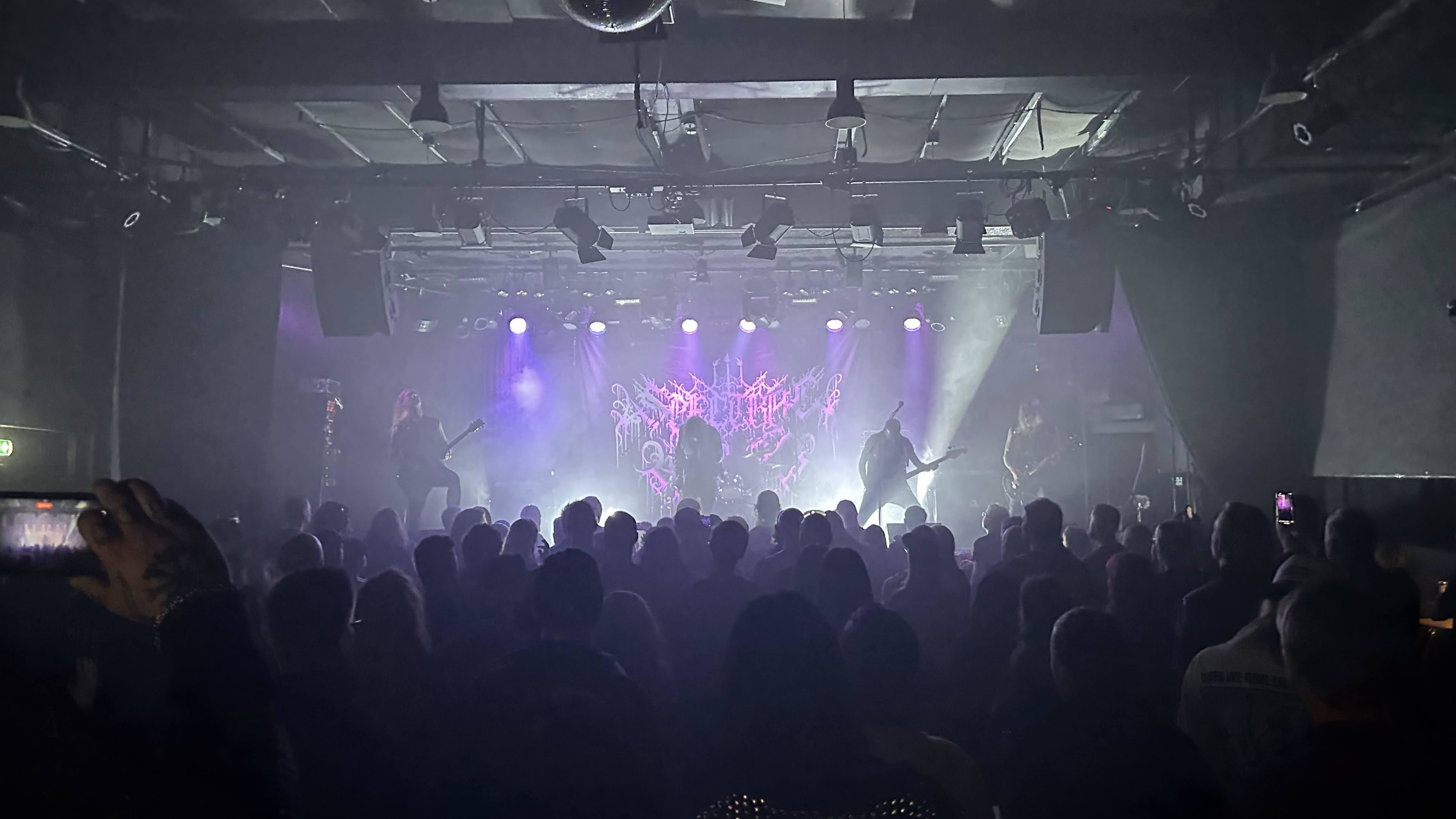

Background information
- Genre: Black metal
- Years active: 2014–present
- Label: Profound Lore Records
- Members: Illusory; Jonah Campbell; Patrick McDowall; Sam; Sean Zumbusch

Spectral Wound is a Canadian black metal band formed in 2014, signed to Profound Lore Records.

Despite hailing from Montreal, the band has little in common with the Francophone Métal Noir Québécois which tends to focus on local history and folklore, and has instead been described as having a "fixation on black metal's universal core tenets", as well as being a "direct, blunt, punchy black metal reset".

While not an overtly political band, they have voiced opposition against National Socialist black metal (NSBM), stating that they believe their lyrics are "very clearly opposed to fascism and racist ideology".

== Discography ==
- Terra Nullius (2015)
- Infernal Decadence (2018)
- A Diabolic Thirst (2021)
- Songs of Blood and Mire (2024)
