= Pillorian =

American metal band

- Origin: Portland, Oregon, United States
- Genres: Black metal
- Years active: 2016–2019
- Label: Eisenwald Tonschmiede
- Members: John Haughm; Trevor Matthews; Stephen Parker

Pillorian was an American metal band from Portland, Oregon. It was formed in 2016 by John Haughm, Trevor Matthews, and Stephen Parker. Pillorian released their only full-length album, Obsidian Arc, on March 10, 2017.

== History ==
Pillorian was formed early in the summer of 2016 with the stated goal of "[creating] a unique, sinister, and twisted style of dark/black metal". The word "pillorian" means "of or relating to scorn and condemnation". The band formed shortly after the breakup of Haughm's previous band, Agalloch.

On February 10, 2017 Pillorian released their first single, "A Stygian Pyre". NPR described the titular song as "feral" and "bestial", but with "enormous" production values.

One month later, on March 10, 2017 Pillorian released their first full studio album, Obsidian Arc. The album received mixed to positive reviews. Sputnik Music gave the album a rating of 5 out of 5, or "classic", and alluding to a lyric from one of Agalloch's songs, summarized its review by saying that "if this grand panorama before me is what you call god... then god is not dead." Decibel magazine gave the album an 8/10 review, calling it "categorically black metal" and "darker, edgier and far more dissonant" than Haughm's previous work as the frontman of Agalloch. Metal Injection called the album a "somewhat promising start", but said that the album was too safe and that despite being good, "seldom [veers] towards being great".

In February 2019, Matthews and Parker both left the band after Haughm made comments on Facebook that were criticized for being antisemitic. In his apology letter, Haughm stated that Pillorian would not continue.

== Members ==
- John Haughm – guitars, vocals (2016–2019)
- Trevor Matthews – drums (2016–2019)
- Stephen Parker – guitars, bass guitar (2016–2019)

== Discography ==
=== Studio albums ===
- Obsidian Arc (March 10, 2017; Label: Eisenwald Tonschmiede)

=== Singles ===
- A Stygian Pyre (February 10, 2017; Label: Eisenwald Tonschmiede)
