= SubRosa (metal band) =

American doom metal band

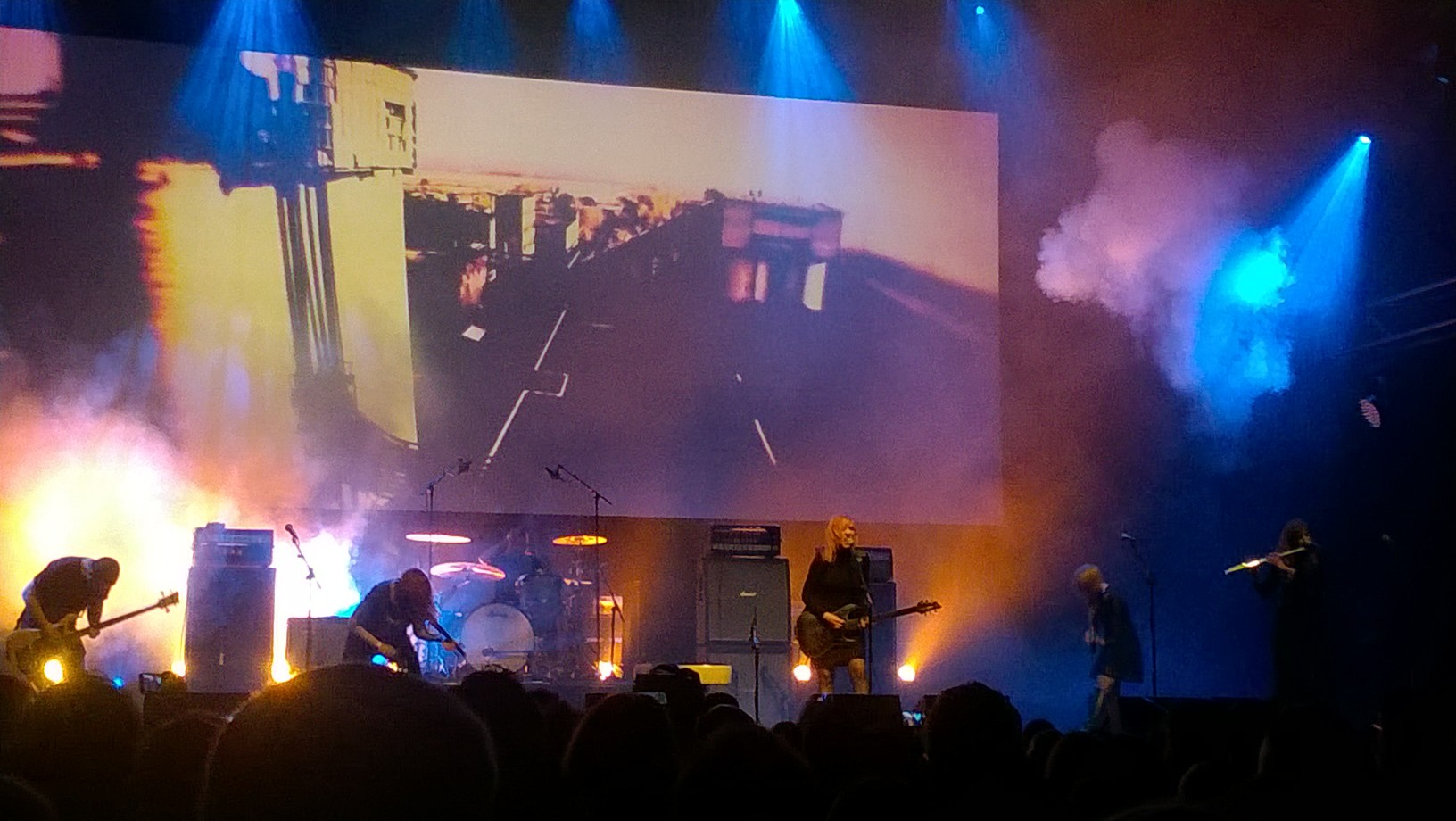
- SubRosa performing at Roadburn 2017.

Background information
- Origin: Salt Lake City, Utah
- Genres: Doom Metal; Sludge Metal; Folk Metal
- Years active: 2005-2019·2025-present
- Label: Profound Lore Records
- Past members: Rebecca Vernon (Lead vocals, Guitar); Sarah Pendleton (Violin, Backing vocals); Kim Pack (Violin, Backing vocals); Zachary Hatsis (Drums); Andy Patterson (Drums); Kory Quist (Bass)

SubRosa is an American doom metal band. One of few female-led doom metal or sludge metal bands, it incorporates folk and orchestral elements, as well as heavily layered production to evoke walls of sound. The band was critically lauded during its initial 13-year run, with multiple albums being listed in the year-end lists of various publications.

== History ==
The band was founded with the demo The Worm Has Turned, then featuring only lead vocalist Rebecca Vernon and violinist Sarah Pendleton. Kim Pack joined as an additional violinist in 2008, and Andy Patterson joined the band as drummer in 2012.

After thirteen years, SubRosa disbanded in 2019. Four members founded a new band, The Otolith. Rebecca Vernon began a solo music project called The Keening, which released its first album in October 2023.

At the end of 2025, the band announced a reunion to play at the Fire in the Mountains festival in July 2026..

== Discography ==
- Strega (2008)
- No Help for the Mighty Ones (2011)
- More Constant Than the Gods (2013)
- For This We Fought the Battle of Ages (2016)
- Subdued (Live at Roadburn, 2017) (2017)
