= Still Point (Amber Asylum album) =

Studio album by Amber Asylum
- Released: May 15, 2007
- Genre: Neoclassical dark wave, dream pop, dark ambient, post-rock, gothic rock, neofolk, experimental
- Length: 63:12
- Label: Profound Lore

Amber Asylum chronology
The Supernatural Parlour Collection (2000)	Still Point (2007)	Bitter River (2009)

Professional ratings
Review scores
Source	Rating
AllMusic	4.5/5 stars
Chronicles of Chaos	7.5/10

Still Point is the fifth studio album by American experimental band Amber Asylum. The album was released on May 15, 2007, through Release Records and Relapse Records.

== Track listing ==
No.	Title	Length
1.	"In the Still Point He Remains"	6:43
2.	"Black Phoebe"	4:43
3.	"The Summation"	4:53
4.	"Outer Dark"	8:51
5.	"Loss Is the Sword"	6:37
6.	"The Great Valerio"	5:03
7.	"Garden of Love"	7:29
8.	"Diminishing Returns"	7:16
9.	"North"	3:21
10.	"12 Months"	8:12
Total length:		63:12

== Credits ==
- Liz Allbee – trumpet
- John Cobbett – acoustic guitar (track 6)
- Kris Force – vocals, viola, violin
- Eric Peterson – acoustic guitar
- Lorraine Rath – acoustic bass, vocals, flute
