= Vasaeleth =

- Origin: Texas and Georgia
- Genres: Death metal
- Years active: 2008–present
- Labels: Profound Lore Records
- Members: Antinom; O.A.

Vasaeleth is an American death metal band formed in 2008. It is a collaboration between Atlanta-based multi-instrumentalist O.A. and Dallas-based drummer Antinom. The band is influenced by old school death metal bands such as Incantation, Immolation, Rottrevore, Demoncy, and Nihilist.

== Background ==
Before founding Vasaeleth, O.A. and Antinom have known each other for over six years from their work in other projects, including Legions of Astaroth and Dagon, respectively. Despite the distance between Georgia and Texas, O.A. and Antinom, ended up performing at common concerts and festivals quite often and have stayed in frequent contact ever since. O.A. and Antinom formed Vasaeleth due to their desires to work with atmospheres and themes not found in their respective other projects.

As O.A. and Antinom, who always answer interviews collectively, explained,

Vasaeleth is an amalgamation of characters that are, indeed, significant to the band’s creative process. Darkened names vibrated by poisoned tongues! There have been several keys presented on all of our releases, to this date anyways, to further decipher the origins of the band name. When a concept like ours is embodied this way, it allows us a certain degree of mystery as far as the name is concerned. As a title, Vasaeleth is a striking moniker, but as for the connectivity to our lyrical work, it functions as a sacred archetype whose resonance crumbles all with the immensity of the universe.

On April 17, 2009, Vasaeleth released a two-track cassette demo titled Demo MMIX, which was released through Satanic Skinhead Propaganda in a limited edition of 200 hand-numbered copies. The demo featured the songs "Figures of Chained Spirits" and "Adorned and Iridescent". These were the first two songs that O.A. and Antinom recorded as a band and were meant to stand as a sort of "mission statement" for Vasaeleth. Originally, O.A. and Antinom had intended on releasing the demo themselves, but, upon hearing it, Satanic Skinhead Propaganda decided to release it. The reaction to the demo was described by O.A. and Antinom as "overwhelmingly positive", as they noted that it sold out in six days.

When asked whether the Vasaeleth supported the right-wing views espoused by Satantic Skinhead Propaganda, O.A. and Antinom replied that

While Vasaeleth is not a politically motivated band, extremity, hatred, and intolerance come with the territory of extreme music. If anyone has a problem with Vasaeleth due to the people we work / associate with, there are, most assuredly, safer bands to listen to. But as you mentioned reputations, SSP has a reputation for releasing some of the most devastating and evil releases ever, so, in that regard, we are more than willing to let the label’s reputation transfer to our own.

Vasaeleth then released the Adorned & Iridescent 7-inch EP, which consisted of the two Demo MMIX songs plus one exclusive track, "Unmanifest". Adorned & Iridescent was released on 9 January 2010 by Satanic Skinhead Propaganda and Blood Harvest Records. Vasaeleth completed work on its full-length debut studio album Crypt Born & Tethered to Ruin in December 2009. Meanwhile, Vasaeleth was signed by Profound Lore Records and arranged for Colin Marston to master the recording. Crypt Born & Tethered to Ruin was released on February 16, 2010, through Profound Lore. In 2013, Vasaeleth released the All Uproarious Darkness EP, again on Profound Lore Records.

== Members ==
- Antinom – Drums
- O.A. – Guitar, Bass, Vocals

== Discography ==
- Demo MMIX (2009)
- Adorned & Iridescent (2010)
- Crypt Born & Tethered to Ruin (2010)
- Profane Limbs of Ruinous Death Split 7-inch w/ Vorum (2010)
- All Uproarious Darkness EP (2013)
