= Pale Folklore =

Studio album by Agalloch
- Released: June 6, 1999
- Recorded: January–February 1999
- Genre: Folk metal; black metal; doom metal
- Length: 62:10
- Label: The End
- Producer: Ronn Chick, John Haughm, Shane Breyer

Agalloch chronology
From Which of This Oak (1997)	Pale Folklore (1999)	Of Stone, Wind, and Pillor (2001)

Professional ratings
Review scores
Source	Rating
AllMusic	4/5 stars
Chronicles of Chaos	9/10

Pale Folklore is the debut studio album by American metal band Agalloch. The album was released on June 6, 1999 by The End Records. It featured an eclectic mix of acoustic folk reminiscent of Scandinavian bands such as Ulver; doom and black metal-esque riffs; growled, clean, whispered, and shrieked vocals; and a production style and atmosphere that borrowed heavily from black metal. The lyrical themes focused mainly on depression, nature, folklore and the supernatural. It featured the roots of a post-rock influence which was greatly expanded on with Agalloch's second studio album, The Mantle.

== Background ==
Vocalist John Haughm said that Pale Folklore was influenced by his upbringing in Montana, where bassist Jason William Walton also lived. While Haughm lived in Seattle during the making of this album, he would make several trips back to Montana per year.

Guitarist Don Anderson said about the album's sound, "We basically mixed Fields of the Nephilim with Ulver and early Katatonia". Haughm said the band wanted to distinguish itself from the American black metal and death metal scenes, and noted the influence of Cocteau Twins and Lycia.

Agalloch signed to The End Records and was given a budget of $1000 to record the album, but the band spent three times that amount, frustrating label founder Andreas Katsambas.

== Artwork ==
The album cover was taken at the Timberline Lodge in Mount Hood, which was also featured in the film The Shining. The band shot several photos of the lodge's walls, doors and woodgrain interior.

== Track listing ==
All tracks are written by John Haughm, except where noted.

No.	Title	Writer(s)	Length
1.	"She Painted Fire Across the Skyline I"		8:35
2.	"She Painted Fire Across the Skyline II"		3:09
3.	"She Painted Fire Across the Skyline III"		7:10
4.	"The Misshapen Steed" (instrumental)	Breyer	4:54
5.	"Hallways of Enchanted Ebony"	Haughm, Anderson	9:59
6.	"Dead Winter Days"	Haughm, Anderson, Walton	7:51
7.	"As Embers Dress the Sky"	Haughm, Anderson	8:04
8.	"The Melancholy Spirit"		12:27
Total length:			62:10

== Personnel ==
Agalloch

- Don Anderson – guitar
- John Haughm – vocals, guitar, drums
- Jason William Walton – bass
- Shane Breyer – keyboards

Additional

- Produced by Ronn Chick, John Haughm and Shane Breyer
- Engineered by Ronn Chick
- Artwork by Dennis Gerasimenko and Sergey Makhotkin
- Band photography by Aaron Sholes
