= The Mantle =

Studio album by Agalloch
- Released: August 13, 2002
- Recorded: November 2001–April 2002
- Genres: Black metal; folk metal; post-metal; doom metal
- Length: 68:25
- Label: The End
- Producers: Ronn Chick, John Haughm

Agalloch chronology
Of Stone, Wind, and Pillor (2001)	The Mantle (2002)	Tomorrow Will Never Come (2003)

The Mantle is the second studio album by American metal band Agalloch. The album was released on August 13, 2002, by The End Records.

== Production ==
Cinema "really emerged as a reference point for how we arranged our music [on The Mantle]," said guitarist Don Anderson. He suggested that the band was "thinking in images and how sound might express those images". Taking a more mellow tone than Agalloch's first full-length, Pale Folklore, The Mantle still contains heavy electric guitar riffs as well as acoustic guitar portions. Anderson pointed to the influence of neofolk music, particularly Death in June, as the impetus for using a strummed acoustic guitar in a darker musical context. Present as well are long and melancholic double bass sequences, such as on the track "I Am the Wooden Doors".

Anderson bluntly said that "metal sucked" in 2001–02 because of nu metal and its popularity, so he turned to post-rock, contemporary classical and singer-songwriters such as Tom Waits and Nick Cave for inspiration instead. A major influence upon Agalloch during this time period was Godspeed You! Black Emperor, with Anderson remarking:

Godspeed, in particular, was the major influence. Their approach to the guitar seemed aligned with black metal. The guitar was no longer a purely riff-based instrument, but provided an ambiguous atmosphere through tremolo-picking either large chords or single melodic lines.

NPR Music described "In the Shadow of Our Pale Companion" as having " Disintegration-dipped electric guitars."

== Artwork and theme ==
The artwork features a photograph of the Thompson Elk Fountain in Agalloch's native Portland. Anderson remarked:

The Thompson Elk is a very well known statue/fountain in downtown Portland which is a city we adore and live in. Agalloch embraces nature because we are siding with what is essentially the victim in a relationship where humankind is a disease. Humanity is inherently self-destructive. The best way to separate myself from what I see as a biologically flawed being is to embrace the very thing these individuals seem bent on destroying.

== Release and reception ==
Professional ratings
Review scores
Source	Rating
AllMusic	4.5/5 stars
Chronicles of Chaos	9.5/10 stars
Metal Crypt	5/5
Metal Storm	9.5/10
Rock Hard	8.0/10
Sputnikmusic	4.5/5 stars

On March 28, 2005, Profound Lore Records released a double LP version of The Mantle on grey-colored vinyl. Limited to 500 copies, it also featured exclusive cover artwork.

The Mantle was released to a very positive reception from critics and fans alike. William York from AllMusic regarded the album as a "leaps-and-bounds improvement" over their first full-length Pale Folklore and held it as one of 2002's most accomplished metal-related albums. York praised the production, the mature detailed arrangements of each song, and "how smoothly they are woven together, creating an album that flows from beginning to end, using its entire 68-minute running time to make its point without wearing out its welcome." Sputnikmusic described the album as an experience of atmosphere: "At times you will be frightened by the sense that you are alone, wandering through desolate, snowy woodlands like the elk on the front cover…while other times, you will be rendered speechless by the waves and waves of stunningly gorgeous soundscapes that grace your ears." They compared the album to Opeth's Damnation, in its dreary and "tremendously addictive" acoustic passages, whilst also treading the line of post-rock and indie-folk. In 2012, Decibel inducted The Mantle into its Hall of Fame. They praised the album as moving with timeless relevancy and claimed its legacy helped inform "generations of frustrated shoe-starers, sky-gazers and nature votaries a half-decade later."

Loudwire called The Mantle the 13th best black metal album of all time. In 2021, Loudwire named it the best metal album of 2002.

In response to the album's feedback, Anderson stated: "We are all very happy with the reception for The Mantle. We were surprised by how successful it was. I would have to say that The Mantle is the most precious to me since it is most representative of our current songwriting."

== Track listing ==
All lyrics written by John Haughm, except track 8 which contained an excerpt from Cherokee folk tale "Earth Making". The song "The Hawthorne Passage" contains a fragment of dialogue from the Swedish movie The Seventh Seal and the Mexican movie Fando y Lis.

No.	Title	Music	Length
1.	"A Celebration for the Death of Man..." (Instrumental)	John Haughm	2:24
2.	"In the Shadow of Our Pale Companion"	Haughm, Don Anderson	14:45
3.	"Odal" (Instrumental)	Haughm	7:39
4.	"I Am the Wooden Doors"	Haughm, Anderson, Jason William Walton	6:11
5.	"The Lodge" (Instrumental)	Haughm	4:40
6.	"You Were But a Ghost in My Arms"	Haughm, Anderson, J. William W.	9:15
7.	"The Hawthorne Passage" (Instrumental)	Haughm, Anderson, J. William W.	11:19
8.	"...And the Great Cold Death of the Earth"	Haughm, Anderson	7:14
9.	"A Desolation Song"	Anderson	5:08
Total length:			68:25

== Personnel ==
Agalloch

- John Haughm – vocals, acoustic and electric guitars, drums, percussion, EBow, woodchimes, samples, production, booklet photography and layout
- Don Anderson – acoustic, classical and electric guitars, piano
- Jason William Walton – bass guitar, noisescape (track 3)

Additional personnel

- Ronn Chick – synth (track 1), samples (track 7), bells (track 8), mandolin (track 9), engineering, mixing, mastering, production
- Ty Brubaker – contrabass (tracks 5, 8, 9), accordion (track 9)
- Danielle Norton – trombone (tracks 7, 8)
- Aaron Sholes – sample (track 4), hand-made grim cymbal bell used (track 2), art direction, pre-production
- Neta Smolack – sample (track 4)
