= Vendlus Records =

American independent record label

- Founded: 2002
- Founder: Joseph Cortese
- Genre: Heavy metal, experimental, rock, electronic
- Country of origin: U.S.
- Location: Washington, D.C.
- Official website: www.vendlus.com

Vendlus Records is an American independent record label based in Washington, D.C. It was founded in 2002 by Joseph Cortese. Vendlus has released records in genres including black metal, indie pop, industrial, avant-garde metal, and electronica.

== Artists ==
- Aerial Ruin (United States)
- Agalloch (United States)
- Arkhum (United States)
- Audiopain (Norway)
- Babyflesh (Norway)
- Brazzaville (United States/Spain)
- David Galas (United States)
- Denture (Norway)
- Diskord (Norway)
- Especially Likely Sloth (United States/Norway)
- Execration (Norway)
- Grayceon (United States)
- Havoc Unit (Finland)
- Island (Germany)
- Megaptera (Sweden)
- The Mist And The Morning Dew (Finland)
- Negru Voda (Sweden)
- Orgone (United States)
- Origami Galaktika (Norway)
- The Sin:Decay (Finland)
- Smohalla (France)
- Syven (Finland)
- Umoral (Norway)
- V:28 (Norway)
- Wolves in the Throne Room (United States)
- Zweizz (Norway)

== Distribution ==
- Main North American distribution is through Omega Distribution which is owned by The End Records this includes One Stop Distribution through Arrow.
- International Distribution is handled through many outlets, most notable are:
1. Belgium - LSP Company
2. England/Éire - Plastic Head Distribution
3. Estonia - Nailboard Records
4. Finland - Firebox Records
5. France - Season of Mist
6. Hungary - Firebox Europe
7. Bulgaria - Firebox Europe
8. Romania - Firebox Europe
9. Norway - Aftermath Music
10. Poland - Foreshadow
11. Greece - SoundForge

== See also ==
- List of record labels
