= A. S. J. Tessimond =

English poet

- Born: 19 July 1902; Birkenhead, England
- Died: 13 May 1962 (aged 59); Chelsea, London
- Education: Birkenhead School; Charterhouse School; University of Liverpool
- Occupation: Poet
- Writing career
- Genre: Poetry

Arthur Seymour John Tessimond (19 July 1902 in Birkenhead – 13 May 1962 in Chelsea, London) was an English poet.

He went to Birkenhead School until the age of 14, before being sent to Charterhouse School, but ran away at age 16. From 1922 to 1926 he attended the University of Liverpool, where he read English literature, French, Philosophy and Greek. He later moved to London where he worked in bookshops, and also as a copywriter.

After avoiding military service in World War II, he later discovered he was unfit for service. He suffered from bipolar disorder, and received electro-convulsive therapy.

He first began to publish in the 1920s in literary magazines. He was to see three volumes of poetry published during his life: Walls of Glass in 1934, Voices in a Giant City in 1947 and Selections in 1958. He contributed several poems to a 1952 edition of Bewick's Birds.

He died in 1962 from a brain haemorrhage.

In the mid-1970s he was the subject of a radio programme entitled Portrait of a Romantic. This, together with the publication by John Bishop of Thames Publishing of the posthumous selection Not Love Perhaps... in 1972, increased interest in his work; and his poetry subsequently began appearing in school books and anthologies.

A 1985 anthology of his work The Collected Poems of A. S. J. Tessimond, edited by Hubert Nicholson, contains previously unpublished works.

In 2010 a new collected poems, based closely on Nicholson's edition, was published by Bloodaxe Books.

In April 2010 an edition of Brian Patten's series Lost Voices on BBC Radio Four was committed solely to Tessimond.
