= Avant-garde metal =

Subgenre of heavy metal music

- Other names: Experimental metal; avant-metal; art metal
- Stylistic origins: Heavy metal; avant-garde; jazz fusion; experimental; extreme metal; progressive rock
- Cultural origins: Mid-1980s, Scandinavia; Switzerland; Japan; United States

Subgenres
- Post-metal

Regional scenes
- Norway; United States

Local scenes
- Boston; Los Angeles; Oslo; San Francisco Bay Area; Seattle; Tokyo

Other topics
- Artists; alternative metal; industrial metal; mathcore; neoclassical metal; progressive metal

Avant-garde metal (also known as avant-metal, experimental metal and art metal) is a subgenre of heavy metal music loosely defined by use of experimentation and innovative, avant-garde elements, including non-standard and unconventional sounds inspired by free jazz, instruments, song structures, playing styles, and vocal techniques. Avant-garde metal is influenced by progressive rock and extreme metal, particularly death metal, and is closely related to progressive metal. Some local scenes include Los Angeles, the San Francisco Bay Area, Boston, and Seattle in the United States, Oslo in Norway, and Tokyo in Japan.

== Characteristics ==
"Avant-garde metal" is interchangeable with "experimental metal" and "avant-metal", Avant-garde metal is related to progressive metal, but avant-garde metal often has more experimentation, while progressive metal usually has a tighter focus on traditional metal instrumentation and higher levels of technical complexity. Avant-garde metal also uses unusual sounds, breaks conventions, and often includes new elements.

The lyrics and visual presentation of the genre are eclectic as well. According to Jeff Wagner in Mean Deviation, electronic percussion and drum machines see widespread use by avant-garde metal bands, along with female vocals and operatic elements, all of which he attributes to the influence of the band Celtic Frost. The Canadian group Voivod also influenced future bands in the genre, pioneering technique such as robotic vocal effects, unusual time signatures, and fractured, dissonant, unorthodox guitar sounds.

== History ==
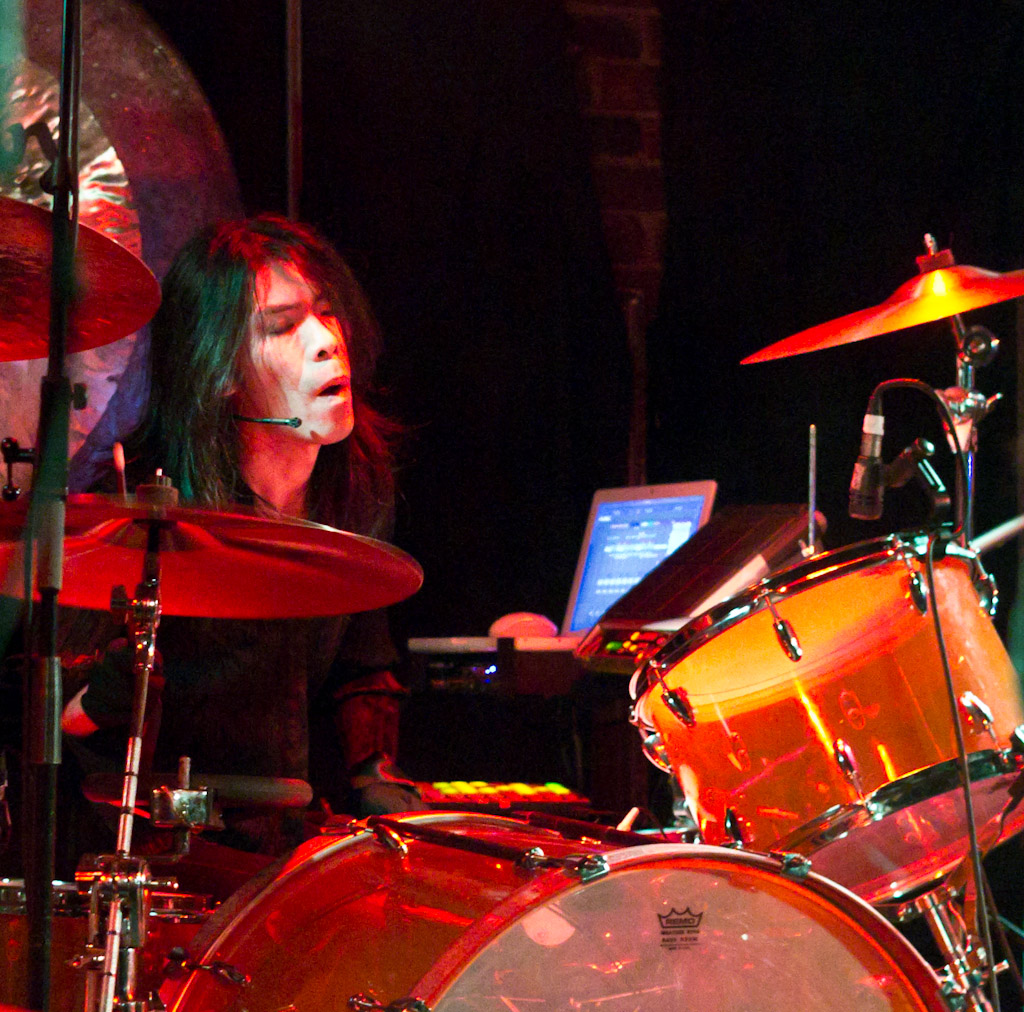
Atsuo of Boris performing in 2011

According to Ian Christe, avant-garde metal emerged from death metal as a number of musicians "abandoned the tightly wound structure of the music and experimented with abstractions of its founding elements". Progressive rock has also been cited as an influence. Some early examples are the King Crimson releases Larks' Tongues in Aspic and Red in 1973 and 1974 respectively, with the latter album's title track defining an "avant-metal style" that Robert Fripp would revisit years later. Another early example is the 1976 Led Zeppelin album Presence. Celtic Frost was an early pioneer of the genre; the term "avant-garde metal" was coined to describe their 1987 release Into the Pandemonium. Other pioneers of avant-garde metal include Gorguts, Boris, Earth, Helmet, Mayhem, Maudlin of the Well, Neurosis, Sunn O))), Mr. Bungle, Today Is the Day, and Voivod.

In the late 1990s, Misanthropy Records emerged as a promoter of Norwegian avant-garde metal until it folded in 2000, and, according to Jeff Wagner, in the late 1990s and early 2000s, a so-called "new wave of avant-garde metal" was spearheaded by The End Records. Wagner states that "with the support of [Misanthropy and The End Records] and other specialty labels, metal's new avant-garde had arrived." Some other record labels which promote avant-garde metal are Aurora Borealis, The Flenser, Holy Records, Hydra Head Records, Ipecac Recordings, Napalm Records, the Release Entertainment imprint of Relapse Records, Seventh Rule Recordings, and Southern Lord Records. In the United States, local avant-garde metal scenes have emerged in the San Francisco Bay Area with bands such as Giant Squid, Grayceon, and Ludicra, and in Boston, with bands such as Isis, Kayo Dot, and Maudlin of the Well. Some regional scenes that developed in the mid-1990s included the cities of Tokyo, Los Angeles, and Oslo.

== See also ==
- List of avant-garde metal artists
- Category:Avant-garde metal albums

== Sources ==
- Wagner, Jeff (2010). Mean Deviation. Bazillion Points Books. ISBN 0979616336.
