= Aesop Dekker =

American musician

- Dekker in 2016

Background information
- Born: October 1, 1970 (age 55); San Rafael, California
- Origin: Hollywood, Florida
- Genres: Progressive metal, black metal, doom metal, post-rock, folk metal, punk rock, ambient
- Occupation: Musician
- Instrument: Drums
- Years active: Late 1980s–present
- Labels: Profound Lore, Dammerung Arts
- Formerly of: Hickey, Ludicra, Agalloch, Worm Ouroboros, VHÖL, Khôrada
- Website: www.agalloch.org

Aesop Dekker (born October 1, 1970) is an American musician. He is best known for being the drummer of the bands Hickey, Ludicra, Agalloch, Worm Ouroboros, VHÖL and Khôrada.

Aesop has a son, Ezra.
