= Ludicra =

American band

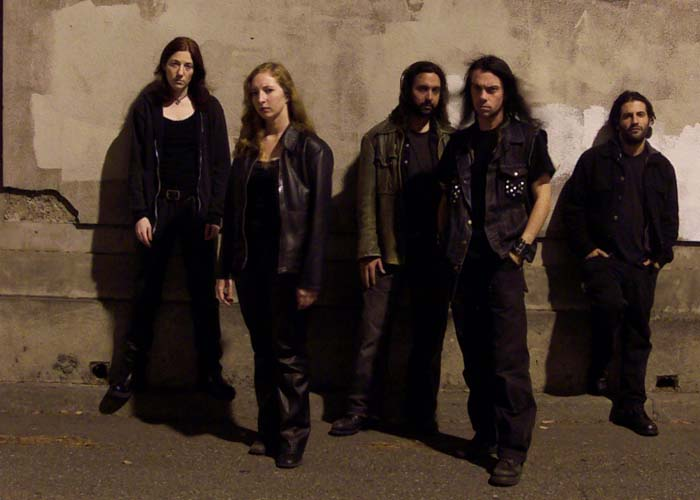

Background information
- Origin: San Francisco, California, U.S.
- Genres: Black metal; avant-garde metal; post-metal; blackgaze
- Years active: 1998–2011, 2022
- Labels: Alternative Tentacles, Profound Lore
- Website: ludicra.org

Ludicra is an American heavy metal band from San Francisco. They formed in 1998 as a quartet and later expanded to five members. The group disbanded in 2011 and reformed in 2022.

Ludicra's sound has been described as black metal and avant-garde metal. Influences include bands such as Darkthrone, Gorgoroth, Dødheimsgard and Bethlehem, and genres like thrash metal, doom metal, punk and folk.

The group included current and former members of other San Francisco-based bands such as Impaled, Hammers of Misfortune, Tallow, Missile Command, Ominum and punk band Hickey. They shared stages with Impaled, Total Shutdown, the Fucking Champs and Krallice.

The band reunited in 2022 and performed at the Northwest Terror Fest in Seattle, and at the Great American Music Hall in San Francisco.

== Band members ==
=== Last lineup ===
- John Cobbett – guitars (1998–2011)
- Christy Cather – guitars, vocals (1998–2011)
- Ross Sewage – bass (1999–2011)
- Laurie Sue Shanaman – vocals (1999–2011)
- Aesop Dekker – drums (1998–2011)

=== Former members ===
- Jesika Christ – bass, vocals (1998–1999)

=== Session members ===
- Melynda Jackson
- Lorraine Rath
- Kris Force
- Sigrid Sheie
- Jackie Perez-Gratz

== Discography ==
- Hollow Psalms (Life Is Abuse, 2002)
- Another Great Love Song (Alternative Tentacles, 2004)
- S/T EP (Life Is Abuse, 2006)
- Fex Urbis Lex Orbis (Alternative Tentacles, 2006)
- The Tenant (Profound Lore Records, 2010)

=== Other appearances ===
- Metal Swim – Adult Swim (compilation album; 2010)
