= Profound Lore Records =

Canadian independent record label

- Founded: May 2004
- Founder: Chris Bruni
- Genre: Extreme metal, heavy metal, experimental
- Country of origin: Canada
- Location: New Hamburg, Ontario
- Official website: www.profoundlorerecords.com

Profound Lore Records is a Canadian independent record label founded in May 2004. The label primarily focuses on releasing extreme metal and experimental albums.

It "began as the 'hobby-like venture' of a few friends but, over the past six years, the label has evolved into a one-man enterprise, shaped a distinct 'aesthetic identity' and provided owner Chris Bruni with a full-time job." Notable artists who have published their work by the label include Agalloch and Bell Witch.

The label has been described as having imbued brand loyalty to some fans. The label received criticism from The A.V. Club for distributing National Socialist black metal artists.

== Artists ==
- Agalloch
- Alan Averill
- Alcest
- Altar of Plagues
- Amber Asylum
- Amesoeurs
- The Angelic Process
- The Atlas Moth
- Bell Witch
- Bosse-de-Nage
- Blacklist
- Bloody Panda
- Castevet
- Cobalt
- Dälek
- Disma
- Full of Hell
- The Gates of Slumber
- Hammers of Misfortune
- Krallice
- Leviathan
- Lingua Ignota
- Locrian
- Ludicra
- Monarch!
- Nadja
- Nocturnus AD
- Old Man Gloom
- Pallbearer
- Pissgrave
- Portal
- Prurient
- Slough Feg
- Spectral Wound
- SubRosa
- Sumac
- Vasaeleth
- Winterfylleth
- Witch Mountain
- Yakuza
- Yob
