= The End Records =

American record label

- Parent company: BMG Rights Management
- Founded: 1998
- Founder: Andreas Katsambas
- Status: Active
- Distributors: BMG Rights Management (digital); Universal Music Group (physical)
- Genre: Rock, heavy metal, experimental, indie rock
- Country of origin: United States
- Location: New York City
- Official website: www.theendrecords.com

The End Records is a record label in Manhattan that specialized in rock, heavy metal, indie, and electronic music.

== History ==
=== Early years (1998–2005) ===
The End Records was founded by Andreas Katsambas in Pasadena, California, with the goal of helping small underground artists. Within three years it became a full-time job and Katsambas moved the office to Salt Lake City in 2002. Too underground to get a national distribution deal, he started his own webstore, which helped cover basic expenses and slowly started bringing in other titles.

The next three years were critical in expanding the label which began signing bands such as The Gathering, Crisis, Arcturus, Ulver and more.

=== National distribution, moving to Brooklyn (2005–2006) ===
In 2005 after meeting with many major distribution companies, The End signed a national distribution deal with RED Music and moved to Brooklyn, NY, the following year.

The move to New York enabled the label to expand and diversify their building roster (Dissection, Moonfog, Voivod) with artists such as Mindless Self Indulgence, Danzig, Lemonheads, Juliette Lewis, Badly Drawn Boy, Brendan Perry, Art Brut, The Prodigy, Anathema, Dir En Grey, and Anvil.

=== Growth (2007–2009) ===
In 2007 The End was featured in Fortune Small Business and CNN which won Fortune their sole New York Press Club award for entertainment news in the magazine category. Now on the rise and gaining attention from press, 2008 won them the CMJ Indie Label of the year award. That same year, they celebrated Mindless Self Indulgence's entrance into the Billboard Top 30 Charts, the highest entry for the band, who also placed three Top 5 singles in the digital charts in the same week. After winning the Eurovision contest with 120,000,000 votes, Finnish metal band Lordi joined the roster, shortly thereafter The Answer came on board, who were hand-picked by AC/DC to support them on their 2008 worldwide tour.

American alternative rock band The Lemonheads finally re-entered the Billboard charts in 2009 with Varshons; the band had not charted since 1996. That year, two more artists signed to the label; Juliette Lewis released Terra Incognita which was featured in multiple iTunes commercials, billboards and advertisements and The Charlatans released Who We Touch which stayed number one for three weeks at the Alt Specialty Radio charts.

=== Diversity (2010–2012) ===
In 2010 multi-platinum-selling artist Danzig entered the Top 40 charts with Deth Red Sabaoth, his highest-charting album since Danzig III. Mercury prize winner Badly Drawn Boy signed to The End and released Part 1 of It's What I'm Thinking series. Canadian metallers Anvil also signed to the label that year, becoming a global phenomenon after the release of their documentary Anvil! The Story of Anvil. With the drastic changes in the music industry, Andreas decided to adapt the label by signing indie electronic artists like Audio Bullys and Does It Offend You Yeah? along with electro-dub artists The Orb and The Prodigy. They launched The End Records Sampler which went number one on the Amazon charts. 2011 also marked the acquisition of the Music For Nations catalog including releases from Opeth, Paradise Lost, Cradle Of Filth, Anathema, Godflesh and more. 2012 brought an especially unique project: the iconic Halo 4 Original Soundtrack. Working with Microsoft, 7 Hz Productions and Neil Davidge proved to be a monumental move for the label and the release, cracking the record for Billboard's Highest Charting Video Game Soundtrack ever. After that, the label began working with UK management company Raw Power and released albums for AxeWound (Bullet For My Valentine, Cancer Bats), Funeral For A Friend, Crossfaith and While She Sleeps. The latter two performed all dates on the highly successful Warped Tour 2013. The End Records rounded out 2012 with Rhythms Del Mundo ‘Africa’, which went number 1 at the iTunes world charts and became the main theme in Wold Bank's annual event.

=== Continued activity (2013–present) ===
2013 brought more success; Helloween entered the US Top 100 charts for the first time in their career and The End's roster also grew with Petula Clark and Fatboy Slim. Later in the year, The End released new albums from The Mission, Sponge, Hey! Hello! (Ginger Wildheart and Victoria Liedtke), Arthur Channel (Jack Irons, Greg Richling, Alain Johannes, Jon Greene), American Sharks, The Red Paintings, Crossfaith, Okta Logue, The Candles, Eklipse, Dead Letter Circus and many more.

The End's new worldwide distribution deal with ADA (Alternative Distribution Alliance) came into effect in 2014 and the label announced some major signers: Nina Persson (The Cardigans, A Camp), Rich Robinson (The Black Crowes) and Neil Davidge. All artists signed on for their new solo albums.

The End also expanded their business model to become a sub-distributor to smaller indie labels including 7 Hz, Crash Collide Records, Evilive Records, Imagen Records, Music For Nations, Small Stone Records, Svart Records, The Middle Ground, Unruly Sounds, Warner Music UK, Universal Scandinavia and Wanz0matic Records.

In June 2016, The End was acquired by BMG Rights Management.

== Select artists ==
- Amoral
- Anathema
- Anvil
- Art Brut
- AxeWound
- Badly Drawn Boy
- Band of Merrymakers
- Ben Ottewell
- Better Than Ezra
- Billy Talent
- British Electric Foundation
- Cauldron
- Chantal Claret
- Charm City Devils
- Crisis
- Crossfaith
- The Candles
- Danzig
- Dead Letter Circus
- Dir En Grey
- Everclear
- Fatboy Slim
- FEAR
- Funeral for a Friend
- Hatchet
- Heliotropes
- HIM
- Hinder
- James Iha
- Krokus
- Lordi
- LostAlone
- Mekon
- Michelle Chamuel
- Mindless Self Indulgence
- The Mission
- Neil Davidge
- Nina Persson
- Rich Robinson
- Tarja Turunen
- The Dandy Warhols
- The Lemonheads
- The Prodigy
- The Red Paintings
- The Zombies
- Tournament
- Trapt
- Wakey Wakey
- While She Sleeps

== Select discography ==
- Helloween 'Straight Out Of Hell' (January 22, 2013)
- Funeral For A Friend 'Conduit' (February 5, 2013)
- Fatboy Slim 'Big Beach Boutique 5' (February 19, 2013)
- Godflesh 'Hymns: Special Edition' (February 19, 2013)
- Krokus 'Dirty Dynamite' (March 5, 2013)
- Hatchet 'Dawn Of The End' (March 5, 2013)
- Reverend And The Makers '@Reverend_Makers' (March 5, 2013)
- Lordi 'To Beast Or Not To Beast' (March 19, 2013)
- Petula Clark 'Lost In You' (April 2, 2013)
- LostAlone 'I'm A UFO In This City' (April 2, 2013)
- Art Brut 'Top Of The Pops' (April 16, 2013)
- The Red Paintings 'You're Not One Of Them EP' (April 16, 2013)
- While She Sleeps 'This Is The Six (Digital Deluxe)' (April 23, 2013)
- Sacred Mother Tongue 'Out Of The Darkness' (April 30, 2013)
- Pushmen 'The Sun Will Rise Soon On The False And The Fair' (April 30, 2013)
- Anvil 'Hope In Hell' (May 28, 2013)
- The Orb (Feat. Lee Scratch Perry) 'More Tales From The Observatory' (June 11, 2013)
- British Electric Foundation 'Music For Quality & Distinction, Volume 3: Dark' (June 11, 2013)
- Scott Lucas & The Married Men 'The Cruel Summer EP' (June 25, 2013)
- Eklipse 'A Night In Strings' (June 25, 2013)
- Spirits of the Dead 'Rumours of a Presence' (June 25, 2013)
- Mekon 'Piece of Work' (July 9, 2013)
- The Candles 'La Candelaria' (July 9, 2013)
- Hey! Hello! 'S/T' (July 23, 2013)
- Eklipse 'Electric Air' (September 3, 2013)
- Crossfaith 'Apocalyze' (September 3, 2013)
- The Mission 'The Brightest Light Comes From The Darkest Place' (September 17, 2013)
- Sponge 'Stop The Bleeding' (September 17, 2013)
- American Sharks 'American Sharks' (September 17, 2013)
- Okta Logue 'Tales of Transit City' (October 1, 2013)
- The Red Paintings 'The Revolution Is Never Coming' (October 1, 2013)
- Aloke Alive (July 17, 2015)
- The Zombies Still Got That Hunger (October 9, 2015)
- Wakey Wakey Homeless Poets EP (September 25, 2015)
- Billy Talent Hits (November 24, 2014)
- Rich Robinson The Ceaseless Sight (June 3, 2014)
- Rich Robinson Dirigible Utopia (December 9, 2014)
- Novembers Doom Bled White (July 15, 2014)
- Nocturnal Poisoning Doomgrass (October 7, 2014)
- Nina Persson Animal Heart (February 11, 2014)
- Nabiha Mind the Gap (September 23, 2014)
- Krokus Long Stick Goes Boom: Live from Da House of Rust (April 22, 2014)
- Imam Baildi III (June 16, 2015)
- Hinder When the Smoke Clears (May 12, 2015)
- HIM Razorblade Romance (Deluxe Re-Mastered) (December 15, 2014)
- HIM Love Metal (Deluxe Re-Mastered) (December 15, 2014)
- HIM Greatest Lovesongs (Deluxe Re-Mastered) (December 15, 2014)
- HIM Deep Shadows (Deluxe Re-Mastered) (December 15, 2014)
- Hatchet Fear Beyond Lunacy (October 30, 2015)
- Gotthard Bang! (July 1, 2014)
- Everclear Black Is the New Black (April 28, 2015)
- Dead Letter Circus The Catalyst Fire (October 29, 2013)
- Dead Letter Circus Aesthesis (August 14, 2015)
- Neil Davidge Slo Light (February 25, 2014)
- Neil Davidge Monsters: Dark Continent (April 14. 2015)
- The Dandy Warhols Thirteen Tales from Urban Bohemia Live at The Wonder (March 25, 2014)
- Charm City Devils Battles (September 23, 2014)
- Michelle Chamuel Face the Fire (February 10, 2015)
- Brigitte A bouche que veux-tu (September 18, 2015)
- Better Than Ezra All Together Now (September 9, 2014)
- Ben Ottewell Rattlebag (October 27, 2014)
- Band of Merrymakers Must Be Christmas (November 17, 2014)
- Billy Talent Afraid of Heights (July 29, 2016)
