= Mike Scalzi =

American guitarist and singer

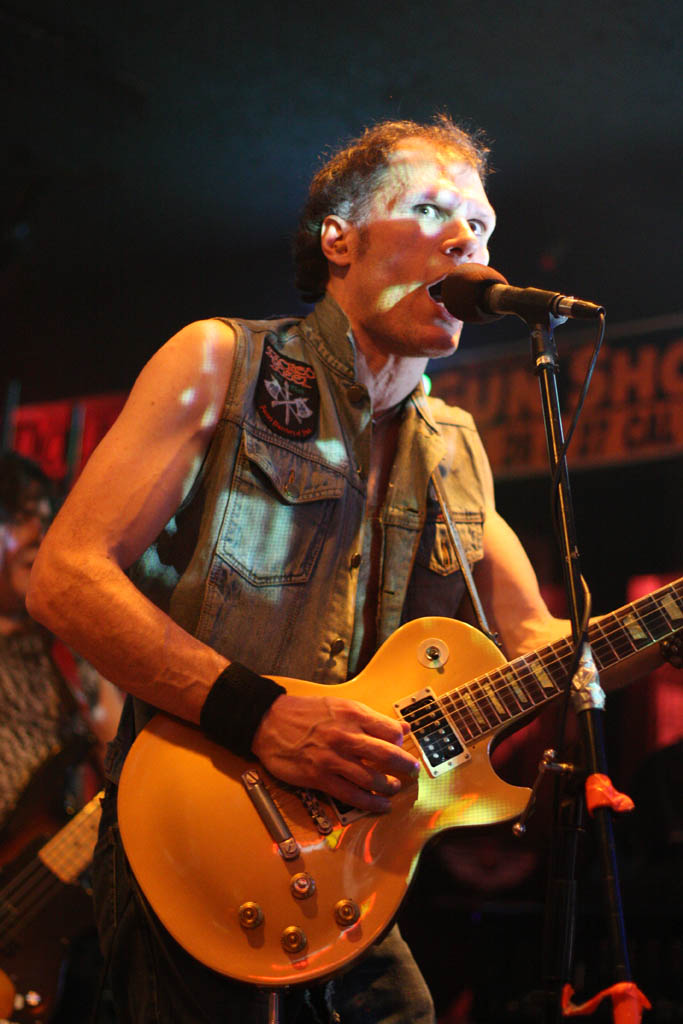
- Scalzi in 2009

Background information
- Born: Michael Scalzi; December 8, 1969 (age 56); Pennsylvania, U.S.
- Genres: Heavy metal, power metal
- Occupations: Musician, songwriter
- Instruments: Guitar, vocals
- Years active: 1986–present
- Member of: Slough Feg
- Formerly of: Hammers of Misfortune, WhipKraft, Heart of Darkness
- Website: sloughfeg.com

Michael Scalzi (born December 8, 1969) is an American musician. He is the frontman for the heavy metal band Slough Feg.

== Career ==
Scalzi's first band was Heart of Darkness, a crossover/hardcore band. He originally auditioned to be the band's guitarist but that role was already taken, so instead he took the spot as the band's vocalist.

=== The Lord Weird Slough Feg ===
In the late 1980s, Scalzi formed The Lord Weird Slough Feg in Pennsylvania, but relocated to San Francisco in 1990 with the hopes of resurrecting the heavy metal scene in the United States. The band produced three demo tapes in the early 1990s before releasing their self-titled debut album in 1996. Since then, the line-up of the band has frequently changed and the name was officially shortened to "Slough Feg" with the release of Atavism in 2005.

=== Hammers of Misfortune ===
Hammers of Misfortune got started in the mid-1990s as Unholy Cadaver when Scalzi joined in with guitarist John Cobbett and drummer Chewy Marzolo. In 2001 the band released its debut album The Bastard. In 2003 the band signed a deal with Cruz Del Sur, releasing their second album The August Engine by the end of the same year. This album was also well received by the metal community. After the release of The Locust Years, Scalzi left the band in order to focus on Slough Feg. Scalzi contributes guest vocals on two tracks of their album Overtaker (2022), “Dark Brennius” and “Overthrower”.

== Personal life ==
Scalzi is a philosophy professor at Diablo Valley College.

== Discography ==
=== Albums with Slough Feg ===
- The Lord Weird Slough Feg (1996)
- Twilight of the Idols (1999)
- Down Among the Deadmen (2000)
- Traveller (2003)
- Atavism (2005)
- Hardworlder (2007)
- The Slay Stack Grows (2008) (compilation)
- Ape Uprising! (2009)
- The Animal Spirits (2010)
- Made in Poland (2011) (live album)
- Digital Resistance (2014)
- New Organon (2019)

=== Albums with Hammers of Misfortune ===
- Unholy Cadaver EP (1998) – as Unholy Cadaver
- The Bastard (2001)
- The August Engine (2003)
- The Locust Years (2006)
