= Hardworlder =

2007 studio album by Slough Feg

Studio album by Slough Feg
- Released: 2007
- Genre: Heavy metal, hard rock
- Length: 42:57
- Label: Cruz del Sur

Slough Feg chronology
Atavism (2005)	Hardworlder (2007)	Ape Uprising! (2009)

Professional ratings
Review scores
Source	Rating
AllMusic	link

Hardworlder is the sixth studio album released by the American heavy metal band Slough Feg (formerly known as The Lord Weird Slough Feg). A vinyl edition was released in 2008 by Iron Kodex Records. The pressing was limited to 525 copies. The first 100 of them were the orange "Gully Foyle" edition.

== Track listing ==
No.	Title	Length
1.	"The Return of Doctor Universe"	1:18
2.	"Tiger! Tiger!"	4:13
3.	"The Sea Wolf"	2:31
4.	"Hardworlder"	4:31
5.	"The Spoils"	2:19
6.	"Frankfurt-Hahn Airport Blues"	2:44
7.	"Galactic Nomad"	3:42
8.	"Dearg Doom" (Horslips cover)	3:17
9.	"Insomnia"	4:11
10.	"Poisoned Treasures"	3:05
11.	"Karma-Kazee"	5:23
12.	"Whirling Vortex"	1:20
13.	"Street Jammer" (Manilla Road cover)	4:29

- "Dearg Doom" is a cover of a Horslips song from their 1973 album The Táin.
- "Street Jammer" is a cover of a Manilla Road song from their 1980 album Invasion.

== Personnel ==
- Mike Scalzi - Vocals/Guitar
- Angelo Tringali - Guitar
- Adrian Maestas - Bass
- Antoine-Diavola - Drums

Additional personnel

- Dan Cilli/Mike Scalzi - Operatic vocals on "Insomnia"
- Producer - Mike Scalzi and Justin Phelps
- Engineer – Justin Phelps
- Engineer [Additional] – Raymond Ruiz
- Mastering – Justin Weis
- Artwork – James E. Lyle
- Photography – Adrian Maestas
- Design – Scott Hoffman/Eyedolatry
