= Necropolis (disambiguation) =

A necropolis is a city of the dead (i.e. a cemetery city or mythical place).

Necropolis may also refer to:

== Books ==
- Necropolis (Pahor novel), a 1967 autobiographic novel by Boris Pahor
- Necropolis (Copper novel), a 1980 gothic novel by Basil Copper
- Necropolis (Horowitz novel), a 2008 'Power of Five' novel by Anthony Horowitz
- Necropolis (Judge Dredd story), a Judge Dredd storyline that ran in 2000 AD and the Judge Dredd Megazine
- Necropolis, the third novel in Dan Abnett's Gaunt's Ghosts series
- Necrópolis, a 2009 novel by the Colombian novelist Santiago Gamboa

== Film, TV, and games ==
- Necropolis (browser game), a browser game implemented in Adobe Flash
- Necropolis (film), a 1970 Italian film
- Necropolis (video game), a 2016 video game
- Necropolis, a city populated by ghouls in the 1997 video game Fallout
- Necropolis: Atlanta, a 1994 book for the tabletop role-playing game Wraith: The Oblivion

== Music ==
- Necropolis Records, an American record label
- Necropolis (album), a 2009 album by Polish death metal band Vader
- "Necropolis", a song by The Black Dahlia Murder from the album Deflorate
- "Necropolis", a song by Manilla Road from the album Crystal Logic
- "Necropolis", a song by Kamelot from the album Poetry for the Poisoned

== See also ==
- Glasgow Necropolis, a Victorian cemetery in Glasgow.
- London Necropolis Company, a company which provided out-of-town burials, and later specialised in exhumations
- Toronto Necropolis, a historic cemetery in Toronto, Ontario, Canada
- Rookwood Cemetery, officially named Rookwood Necropolis and historically simply referred to Necropolis, a cemetery in Sydney, Australia
