= New Organon =

2019 studio album by Slough Feg

Studio album by The Lord Weird Slough Feg
- Released: June 14, 2019
- Studio: El Studio, San Francisco, Francisco Studios Turk St. (tracks 6 & 10)
- Genre: Heavy metal, folk metal, power metal
- Length: 37:00
- Label: Cruz del Sur Music

The Lord Weird Slough Feg chronology
Digital Resistance (2014)	New Organon (2019)

New Organon is the tenth studio album by American heavy metal band Slough Feg. It was released under their original name "The Lord Weird Slough Feg" on June 14, 2019, by Cruz del Sur Music, their return to that label after being signed to Metal Blade Records for their previous album Digital Resistance.

== Background and themes ==
The album title comes from the philosophical work by Francis Bacon, titled Novum Organum (translated to "New organon") However, frontman Mike Scalzi said that the title song is about Aristotle, and it was written before "New Organon" became the album title.

"Headhunter" is an early song for the band, written by Scalzi in 1992. A few other songs in the album were, like the title track, inspired by philosophical works; "Discourse on Equality" is based on Discourse on Inequality, and "Coming of Age in the Milky Way" is based on the book written by Timothy Ferris. Scalzi stated about the latter:

"I had to get a little bit of Neil deGrasse Tyson and astrophysics in there even though I know nothing about it! "Coming of Age in the Milky Way" is a textbook about that stuff and it goes the whole way back to Isaac Newton and all these guys.
"I sort of threw around and played with these ideas that interest me and try to make fun songs about them. That's about it. Just like I do about disembowelment and cattle raids and Celtic-Viking wars, it's the same, it was just something in a book that I enjoyed studying and I guess I just dramatize it in the song. That's about it."

"Uncanny" was sung by the band's bassist Adrian Maestas, one of only a few Slough Feg songs to have someone besides Scalzi contribute vocals.

== Reception ==
Brave Words & Bloody Knuckles honored New Organon as #10 in the top 30 BravePicks of 2019. Chris Ayers of Exclaim praised the album, explaining that "the San Francisco band formerly known as Slough Feg hadn't used their original title, the Lord Weird Slough Feg, since 2003's Traveller album. But bandleader Mike Scalzi takes back his band's formal title (and dispenses with their folksy metal of yore) on the blazing New Organon, a decisive return to their more metallic, take-no-prisoners songwriting. Not that they had strayed far from the power-metal leanings of previous albums — namely 1999's Twilight of the Idols and 2000's Down Among the Deadmen — but New Organon brings together all their finest musicality into one cohesive and effective statement." Carl Fisher of GBHBL wrote a moderately positive track-by-track review for the album. The Metal Storm review is rather mixed, stating that while the album is enjoyable, "it does feel underdeveloped at times, and if you didn't get that impression from this review, it is probably because the reviewer always has ridiculous expectations from The Lord Weird Slough Feg."

== Track listing ==
No.	Title	Length
1.	"Headhunter"	05:06
2.	"Discourse on Equality"	02:53
3.	"The Apology"	03:17
4.	"Being and Nothingness"	02:50
5.	"New Organon"	04:28
6.	"Sword of Machiavelli"	02:18
7.	"Uncanny"	04:36
8.	"Coming of Age in the Milky Way"	03:55
9.	"Exegesis/Tragic Hooligan"	03:55
10.	"The Cynic"	03:42

== Personnel ==
Slough Feg

- Mike Scalzi – guitars, vocals
- Angelo Tringali – guitars
- Adrian Maestas – bass, vocals (track 7)
- Harry Cantwell – drums

Technical personnel

- Phil Manley – recording, mixing
- Batuka – recording (tracks 6 & 10), photos
- Justin Weis – mastering
- Annick Giroux – art
