= Out of the Abyss =

Studio album by Manilla Road
- Released: July 1988
- Studios: Miller Studio, North Newton, Kansas
- Genres: Heavy metal; thrash metal
- Length: 42:35
- Label: Leviathan
- Producers: Manilla Road, Max Merhoff

Manilla Road chronology
| Mystification (1987) | Out of the Abyss (1988) | The Courts of Chaos (1990) |

Professional ratings
Review scores
| Source | Rating |
|---|---|
| AllMusic | link |
| The Metal Crypt | 8/10 |

Out of the Abyss is the seventh studio album by American heavy metal band Manilla Road. It was first issued in 1988 on Leviathan Records, then re-released in 2005 on Cult Metal Classics. Though the band had been constantly increasing the thrash metal influence to their music since their album Open the Gates, this album was its peak, being almost completely thrash metal.

== Track listing ==
1. "Whitechapel" – 7:16
2. "Rites of Blood" – 4:18
3. "Out of the Abyss" – 3:25
4. "Return of the Old Ones" – 6:22
5. "Black Cauldron" – 2:57
6. "Midnight Meat Train" – 3:00
7. "War in Heaven" – 4:58
8. "Slaughterhouse" – 3:40
9. "Helicon" – 6:39

== Credits ==
Manilla Road

- Mark Shelton – lead vocals, guitar
- Scott Park – bass
- Randy Foxe – drums, percussion, backing vocals

Additional personal

- Mike Curtis – chimes

Production

- Mixed at Prairie Sun Studios
- Manilla Road, Max Merhoff – producers
- Steve Fontano – mixing
- Max Merhoff – co-producer
- David T. Chastain – executive producer
- Aaron Brown – artwork
- Mastered at Fantasy Studios
