= Dead as Dreams =

Studio album by Weakling
- Released: 2000
- Genre: Black metal
- Length: 76:08
- Label: tUMULt
- Producer: Weakling

Weakling chronology
Rehearsal Demo (1998)	Dead as Dreams (2000)

Professional ratings
Review scores
Source	Rating
AllMusic	4.5/5 stars
Chronicles of Chaos	10/10

Dead as Dreams is the only studio album by American black metal band Weakling. It was recorded in 1998 and released in 2000, through the tUMULt record label, while the band itself ceased activity in 1999. The title of the album comes from a line in the movie Legend, while the art featured on the cover is a print by Spanish artist Francisco Goya titled Buen Viaje from the set Los caprichos.

In 2013, Decibel ranked Dead as Dreams at number 20 on its list of the Top 100 Black Metal Albums of All Time.

== Release ==
Dead as Dreams was initially released on cassette, double-vinyl and CD. The tape version was limited to 300 copies.

== Track listing CD version ==
No.	Title	Length
1.	"Cut Their Grain and Place Fire Therein"	10:28
2.	"Dead as Dreams"	20:39
3.	"This Entire Fucking Battlefield"	14:47
4.	"No One Can Be Called as a Man While He'll Die"	13:09
5.	"Desasters in the Sun"	17:05
Total length:		76:08

Note: The LP version has the tracks in a different order: "No One Can Be Called as a Man While He'll Die" comes before all the other tracks.
Note: The title "Desasters in the Sun" is, on the one hand, taken from a line in Shakespeare's Hamlet, Act I, Scene I. On the other hand, the spelling of "Desasters" is a reference to the Destruction song "Total Desaster" from their debut release Sentence of Death.

== Personnel ==
- John Gossard – guitar, vocals
- Casey Ward – keyboards
- Little Sunshine (Sam) – drums
- Sara Weiner – bass guitar
- Joshua M. Smith – guitar
