= The Animal Spirits (Slough Feg album) =

2010 studio album by Slough Feg

Studio album by Slough Feg
- Released: October 26, 2010
- Genres: Heavy metal, folk metal, power metal
- Length: 38:38
- Label: Profound Lore

Slough Feg chronology
Ape Uprising! (2009)	The Animal Spirits (2010)	Digital Resistance (2014)

The Animal Spirits is the eighth studio album released by American heavy metal band Slough Feg. It is the first album by Slough Feg to be released by label Profound Lore Records. A vinyl pressing of the album was released on February 21, 2011, by Cruz del Sur Music. The album was remastered for vinyl release by Justin Weis to play at high resolution (24 bit/96 kHz .wav).

== Promotion ==
Leading up to the album's release, Mike Scalzi debuted a series of articles on popular metal webzine Invisible Oranges. These pieces, entitled "Bullpen Bulletins" featured Scalzi philosophizing about the current state of the metal scene, particularly about the elements that he felt are causing stagnation of musical creativity. While some readers saws these postings as too critical of the genre, Scalzi reiterated that by voicing his opinions he was trying to stir up debate and engage in discussion with fans of differing viewpoints. Regarding the seemingly harsh nature of some of his comments, Scalzi affirmed, "In fact, I am definitely a MUSICAL SNOB!! How can one not be in today's musical climate?!" In total, Scalzi contributed four "Bullpen Bulletins", including two after The Animal Spirits was released. While Scalzi comments tangentially about certain aspects of the album, such as Bob Wright's inclusion as a guest vocalist, the subject matter of the articles are decidedly not focused on the album itself. These articles also received a moderate amount of praise from the heavy metal journalistic community. On his NPR-based blog, heavy metal journalist Lars Gotrich defended the frankness of Scalzi's writing, saying, "It's a damning clarion call for quality control, and while Scalzi may come off as a curmudgeonly metal purist, he's really just a bleeding heart."

While no named tour was organized to promote the album's release, Slough Feg organized several shows in 2011 along the west coast and in the Midwest. Several European festival dates are also scheduled to take place during the summer of 2011.

== Stylistic elements ==
According to lead singer and guitarist Mike Scalzi, the album's title refers to an Aristotelian theory of perception that postulated a fluid called "animal spirits" that flowed through the veins of human beings, carrying information of perception in order to be stored in the heart. Unlike many of Slough Feg's albums that are united under a single concept or theme, the songs on The Animal Spirits cover many different subject with their lyrical content, such as "Medieval Catholic theology", "horror themes", and "frustration, misery and madness".

In an interview with Adam Kohrman of The Metal Crypt, Scalzi revealed that some of his ideas for lyrics come from his experience as a professor of philosophy. Specifically addressing the lyrics to the song "95 Thesis", Scalzi said, "It's all just Martin Luther, and putting the different things together that you've read about what he did [for a lecture], and lyrics come [from that process]. . . . So then because you're going through that process of reconfiguring it, making it into a form that people can understand more clearly and all that. Naturally, that's the same process you go through in songwriting."

The Animal Spirits is the first Slough Feg album to exclusively feature art done by lead singer and guitarist Mike Scalzi. The rough-looking, stylized priest that appears on the cover is a departure from the more intricate, fantasy- and sci-fi-inspired artwork featured on previous releases. In a November 2010 interview, Scalzi commented on the choice of not getting a professional artist, saying, "[T]hat's how the music looks to me. The scratchy pen and ink, that's how it looks to me. That's how Slough Feg music always looks to me. We've always had artwork that's too modernized, too slick. It never should have been like that, it should've been more scratchy, because those are the images that inspired what our music was to become."

== Track listing ==
No.	Title	Length
1.	"Trick the Vicar"	1:54
2.	"The 95 Thesis"	3:12
3.	"Materia Prima"	3:32
4.	"Free Market Barbarian"	2:40
5.	"Lycanthropic Fantasies"	4:48
6.	"Ask the Casket"	4:24
7.	"Heavyworlder"	3:11
8.	"The Tell-Tale Heart" (The Alan Parsons Project cover)	3:54
9.	"Kon-Tiki"	4:06
10.	"Second Coming"	4:38
11.	"Tactical Air War"	2:19

== Reception ==
The Animal Spirits has received mostly positive reviews. Larry Griffin of The Metal Crypt gave the album five out of five, praising it for "something very natural and organic about the sound of The Animal Spirits, with its jangling guitars and earthy bass tone and scratchy drums." Griffin also gave a glowing appraisal of Scalzi's vocals, saying in summation, "Frankly, he's never sounded better." Adam Kohrman, another reviewer from The Metal Crypt, gave The Animal Spirits a slightly lower, but still favorable, score of four and one-quarter out of five. Kohrman highlighted a stylistic shift from earlier albums by pointing out that this release "is more of a gritty record made with sheer emotion mixed with punk-like rawness" and that the "epic themes that marked their earlier work are close to gone."

Philip Whitehouse of OneMetal scored the album four out of five in his review, saying, "If you're exhausted with Pro-Tools-spawned, clinically 'extreme' deathcore and point-missing thrash revivalists, or you're just looking for a sheer unadulterated blast of 70s-style trad metal energy, The Animal Spirits is certainly the album for you." On a critical note, Whitehouse mentions that not all of the tracks on the album stand out, specifically citing "Ask the Casket" and "Heavyworlder" as creating a "mid-album slump". PopMatters gave the album seven out of ten stars, stating that for Slough Feg, "It's not their goal to reinvent the wheel, rather they're simply happy riding it ragged, no matter how predictable the music becomes." Despite this lack of invention, the review writer Adrien Bergrand calls the band "a metal version of comfort food", saying that "they consistently bring instant gratification to fans of old-fashioned heavy metal."

== Personnel ==
- Mike Scalzi – guitars/vocals, all lyrics except for "Tell-Tale Heart", artwork, production
- Angelo Tringali – guitars
- Adrian Maestas – bass
- Harry Cantwell – drums
- Bob Wright (of Brocas Helm) – vocals on "Tactical Air War"
- Justin Weis – production
- Alan Parson, Eric Woolfson – lyrics on "Tell-Tale Heart"
