= The Bastard (album) =

Studio album by Hammers of Misfortune
- Released: 2001
- Recorded: July 1999 – February 2000 in San Francisco, California
- Genre: Heavy metal, progressive metal
- Length: 46:10
- Label: Tumult Records
- Producer: John Cobbett

Hammers of Misfortune chronology
| The Bastard (2001) | The August Engine (2003) |

Professional ratings
Review scores
| Source | Rating |
|---|---|
| AllMusic | 4/5 stars |

The Bastard is the first album by the American progressive/heavy metal band Hammers of Misfortune, released in 2001.

== Critical reception ==
AllMusic wrote: "Nothing less than a three-act heavy metal opera with role-playing vocals sung by the band members, the album draws on a whole range of metal influences—from Thin Lizzy and Iron Maiden to Mercyful Fate and Opeth—and ties them together with some Celtic folk touches to create a sound that, while it does feel a little '80s nostalgic, is actually pretty original." Loudwire thought that there's not "much of a musical precedent for the group’s fearless brand of blackened prog-metal, made all the more stunning and unique by distinct vocal styles for each character and even folk music ingredients." SF Weekly declared that "Hammers of Misfortune's well-orchestrated melodicism, kaleidoscopic riffs, quirky time signatures, and striking vocals are grandiose and metalriffic—and that's no myth."

== Track listing ==
Act One
| No. | Title | Lyrics | Music | Length |
|---|---|---|---|---|
| 1. | "The Dragon Is Summoned" | Erica Stoltz, John Cobbett | Cobbett | 2:29 |
| 2. | "The Bastard Sapling" | Mike Scalzi | Cobbett | 2:23 |
| 3. | "On Wings of Vengeance" | Stoltz, Scalzi, Cobbett | Cobbett | 2:28 |
| 4. | "Hunting Tyrant" | Cobbett | Cobbett | 2:30 |
| 5. | "You Should Have Slain Me" | Scalzi, Cobbett | Cobbett | 3:26 |

Act Two
| No. | Title | Lyrics | Music | Length |
|---|---|---|---|---|
| 6. | "An Oath Sworn in Hell" | Cobbett | Cobbett, Scalzi | 6:40 |
| 7. | "The Blood Ax Speaks" | Janis Tanaka, Cobbett | Cobbett | 2:28 |
| 8. | "Tyrant Dies" | Cobbett | Cobbett | 3:42 |
| 9. | "The Witch's Dance" | Cobbett | Cobbett, Tanaka | 2:31 |

Act Three
| No. | Title | Lyrics | Music | Length |
|---|---|---|---|---|
| 10. | "The Prophesy Has Two Meanings / Coronation" | Cobbett | Cobbett | 2:12 |
| 11. | "The New King's Lament" | Scalzi | Cobbett | 1:54 |
| 12. | "For the Ax" | Cobbett | Cobbett | 2:56 |
| 13. | "Troll's March" | Cobbett | Cobbett | 1:34 |
| 14. | "Sacrifice / The End" | Cobbett, Tanaka | Cobbett, Tanaka | 8:57 |

== Personnel ==
Hammers of Misfortune

- John Cobbett – electric guitar, acoustic guitar, screams
- Chewy Marzolo – drums
- Janis Tanaka – bass guitar, vocals
- Mike Scalzi – electric guitar, vocals

Production

- Rich Morin – engineer
- Justin Weis – mixing and mastering at Trakworx, South San Francisco, California
- John Cobbett – producer
- Lorraine Rath – illustrations, design, lettering
- Ross Sewage and Jeanie M. – photography

== Additional information ==
- The band did not record The Bastard in a typical recording studio. The liner notes state: "this album was recorded on an 8-track analog machine in a rehearsal space in San Francisco between July 1999 and February 2000."
