= Weakling =

Weakling may refer to:

- Weakling (band), American black metal band from San Francisco, United States
- "Weakling" (song), from the album Filth by the Swans

== See also ==
- Muscle weakness
- Weakness
