= Hammers of Misfortune =

American heavy metal band

- Also known as: Unholy Cadaver
- Origin: San Francisco, California, U.S.
- Genres: Heavy metal; progressive metal; folk metal; doom metal; power metal
- Years active: 2000–present
- Labels: tUMULt; Cruz Del Sur; Profound Lore; Shadow Kingdom; Metal Blade
- Members: John Cobbett; Joe Hutton; Leila Abdul-Rauf; Sigrid Sheie; Max Barnett; Chewy Marzolo
- Past members: Janis Tanaka; Mike Scalzi; Jamie Myers; Patrick Goodwin; Jesse Quattro; Ron Nichols

Hammers of Misfortune is an American heavy metal band from San Francisco, California. The band's style has varied from album to album, at times incorporating different elements of folk metal, doom metal, NWOBHM, black metal, 1970s rock, and thrash metal. It is the brainchild of guitarist John Cobbett, who serves as the band's producer and primary songwriter.

== History ==
Hammers of Misfortune was formed in the mid-1990s, under the name Unholy Cadaver. At the time, the only members were guitarist John Cobbett and drummer Chewy Marzolo, both of whom shared vocal duties. Enlisting the help of other musicians, among them Mike Scalzi of Slough Feg, they recorded a full album's worth of material in their rehearsal space. However, only three of these nine tracks were included on the band's aptly titled Demo No. 1, and the majority of the material remained unreleased until 2011, when Shadow Kingdom Records released the entire recording as the Unholy Cadaver LP. Unholy Cadaver's output laid the groundwork for what would become Hammers of Misfortune's signature style, but it also contained elements of death metal (mainly in John Cobbett's vocals) that would be phased out in future recordings.

In 2000, the band changed its name to Hammers of Misfortune, taking its moniker from a track on the Unholy Cadaver demo. Recruiting Scalzi and Janis Tanaka (formerly of Fireball Ministry and L7), the band released its 2001 concept album The Bastard on Tumult Records. The Bastard received many positive reviews in the metal community, including several "best of 2001" awards from magazines such as Terrorizer and Lamentations Of The Flame Princess.

In 2003, the band signed a deal with Cruz Del Sur Music, releasing their second album The August Engine by the end of the same year. This album was also well received by the metal community, getting a 10/10 review from Brave Words & Bloody Knuckles magazine among other acclamations. After The August Engine, Janis Tanaka left the band and was replaced by Jamie Myers.

After The Locust Years, there was a large lineup change. Mike Scalzi left the band, in order to focus on his main band, Slough Feg, and Jamie Myers left the band in order to raise a family. Scalzi was replaced by Patrick Goodwin, and Jesse Quattro replaced Myers. The original drummer, Chewy, left and rejoined the band. With this new lineup, the band recorded the double album, Fields/Church of Broken Glass, in 2008. However, this lineup was not to last, as Quattro and Goodwin parted ways with the band in 2010. Cobbett subsequently recruited guitarist/vocalist Leila Abdul-Rauf and lead vocalist Joe Hutton.

In March 2010, Hammers of Misfortune announced that they had signed a record deal with Metal Blade Records. Since then, Metal Blade has re-released The Bastard, The August Engine, The Locust Years, and Fields/Church of Broken Glass. In October 2011, the band produced their fifth studio album, 17th Street, which was well-received by critics, with positive reviews from Pitchfork, AllMusic, The Quietus, and PopMatters.

The band's sixth album, Dead Revolution, was released in the summer of 2016 following a long hiatus, during which Cobbett and keyboardist Sigrid Sheie had a child and Hutton recovered from a motorcycle accident while other band members were involved with various side projects. Cobbett mentioned "technology and gentrification" as two of the subjects he thought about during the writing of the album.

In 2022, the band returned with Overtaker, featuring a new lineup and guest vocals by Scalzi.

== Band members ==
=== Current ===
- John Cobbett – guitars (ex-Gwar, ex-Slough Feg, Ludicra, Amber Asylum, Jarboe, Malefice (DC), VHÖL)
- Joe Hutton (The Worship of Silence) – vocals
- Leila Abdul-Rauf (Saros, Amber Asylum) – guitar, vocals
- Sigrid Sheie (Amber Asylum, VHÖL) keyboards, vocals
- Paul Walker (The Worship of Silence) – bass
- Will Carroll (Death Angel, The Cutthroats 9) – drums

=== Former ===
- Janis Tanaka – bass, vocals
- Mike Scalzi – guitars, vocals
- Jamie Myers – bass, vocals
- Ron Nichols – bass
- Patrick Goodwin – guitar, vocals
- Jesse Quattro – vocals
- Max Barnett – bass
- Chewy Marzolo – drums

== Discography ==
- Unholy Cadaver (1998) - as Unholy Cadaver
- The Bastard (2001)
- The August Engine (2003)
- The Locust Years (2006)
- Fields/Church of Broken Glass (2008)
- 17th Street (2011)
- Dead Revolution (2016)
- Overtaker (2022)
