= Dreams of Eschaton =

Compilation album by Manilla Road
- Released: June 2, 2016
- Genre: Hard rock; psychedelic rock; progressive rock; heavy metal
- Length: 144:16
- Label: High Roller

Manilla Road chronology
| The Blessed Curse (2015) | Dreams of Eschaton (2016) | In the Wake (2017) |

Dreams of Eschaton is a double-CD compilation album by American heavy metal band Manilla Road. It was released on June 2, 2016 in both CD and LP format on High Roller Records and features a reissue of the Mark of the Beast album on the first disc along with both the 1979 demo Manilla Road Underground and the 1979 in-studio live After Midnight Live album on the second disc. The name of the compilation refers to the original title of what would become the Mark of the Beast album, released in 2002 but with most of its featured tracks recorded in 1981.

== Track listing ==
Disc 1 – Dreams of Eschaton

1. "Venusian Sea" – 6:10
2. "After Shock" – 5:09
3. "Time Trap" – 6:54
4. "Black Lotus" – 5:00
5. "The Dream" – 2:43
6. "The Teacher" – 4:46
7. "Avatar" – 9:07
8. "The Court of Avalon" – 7:18
9. "Mark of the Beast" – 9:27
10. "Triumvirate" – 8:15

Disc 2 – Manilla Road Underground (track 1–3) and After Midnight Live (track 4–8)

1. "Far Side of the Sun" – 7:05
2. "Manilla Road" – 11:42
3. "Herman Hill" – 9:02
4. "Chromaphobia" – 6:26
5. "Life's So Hard" – 12:31
6. "Pentacle of Truth" – 8:07
7. "Dream of Peace" – 8:35
8. "Herman Hill" – 7:55
9. "Flakes of Time" – 8:04

== Personnel ==
- Mark Shelton – guitars, vocals
- Scott Park – bass
- Rick Fisher – drums
