= Atavism (disambiguation) =

Atavism or atavistic is a concept in biology and in culture.

It may also refer to:

- a record label
- an album by Slough Feg
- an album by Otep
