= Slough Feg =

American heavy metal band

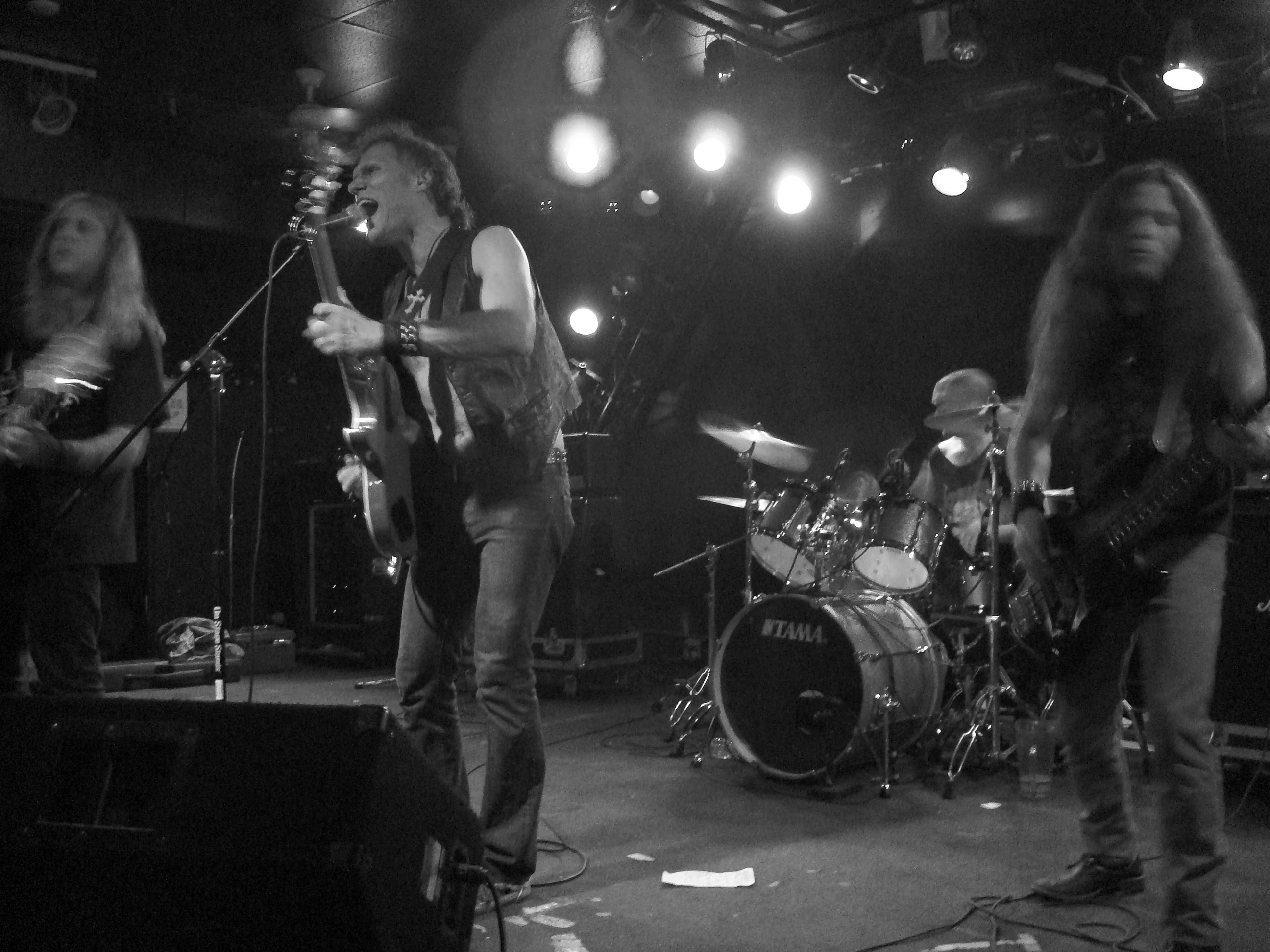
- Slough Feg in 2010

Background information
- Also known as: The Lord Weird Slough Feg
- Origin: Pennsylvania (early); San Francisco, California (later)
- Genres: Heavy metal; power metal; folk metal
- Years active: 1990–present
- Labels: Dragonheart; Cruz del Sur; Profound Lore; Metal Blade
- Members: Mike Scalzi; Angelo Tringalli; Adrian Maestas; Austen Krater
- Website: sloughfeg.com

Slough Feg (also known as The Lord Weird Slough Feg) is an American heavy metal band from Pennsylvania, formed in 1990 and currently based in the San Francisco Bay Area. Taking their name from the Celtic folklore-influenced comic book Sláine, the band released their self-titled debut album in 1996. Slough Feg combines influences from traditional heavy metal bands such as Iron Maiden, Brocas Helm, and Thin Lizzy, as well as English folk metal band Skyclad.

Slough Feg's 2003 album Traveller was a concept album based on the role-playing game of the same name. With the release of Atavism in 2005, the band officially shortened its name to Slough Feg. Guitarist Mike Scalzi maintains that the band always referred to itself this way internally, and the addition of "The Lord Weird" made it too difficult to find Slough Feg albums in stores (which alphabetized the CDs in inconsistent ways). Slough Feg most recently released Traveller Supplement 1: The Ephemeral Glades in 2025.

== History ==
Slough Feg originated in central Pennsylvania and relocated to San Francisco, California in 1990. The band produced three demo tapes in the early 1990s before releasing their self-titled debut album. Bassist Justin Phelps left the band shortly after. In 1998, European music label Dragonheart signed Slough Feg and the band released their second album, Twilight of the Idols, in 1999. The band released Down Among the Deadmen in 2000 and Traveller in 2003.

In 2005, the band moved to Italian record label Cruz del Sur and released their fifth studio album, Atavism. The band also officially shortened their name to "Slough Feg" after the album's release. After the change of name, John Cobbett left in good terms with the band, and was replaced by current member Angelo Tringali in January 2005. Around the same time, drummer Greg Haa left Slough Feg for personal reasons, and was replaced by current member Antoine Reuben-Diavola. In 2007, the band released their sixth album (their second with Cruz del Sur), Hardworlder, recorded and produced with former bass player Justin Phelps. In 2008, they released The Slay Stack Grows via Shadow Kingdom Records, a double-CD release of old demos and live recordings from the band's early days.

Slough Feg toured in Europe and the United States, doing coast-to-coast tours summers of 2005 and 2006, including an appearance at the first annual Alehorn of Power festival in Chicago, Illinois. In January 2013, the band signed with Metal Blade Records.

Having returned to their previous label Cruz del Sur Music, Slough Feg released their album New Organon on June 21, 2019.

== Lineup ==
=== Current members ===
- Mike Scalzi – guitars/vocals (1990–present)
- Angelo Tringali – guitars (2005–present)
- Adrian Maestas – bass (2001–present)
- Austen Krater – drums (2021–present)
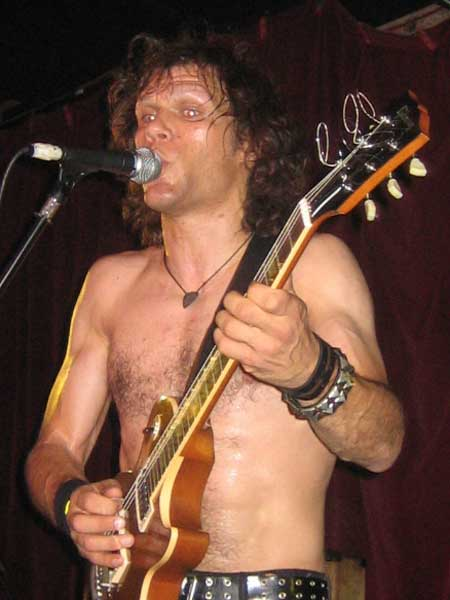
Mike Scalzi

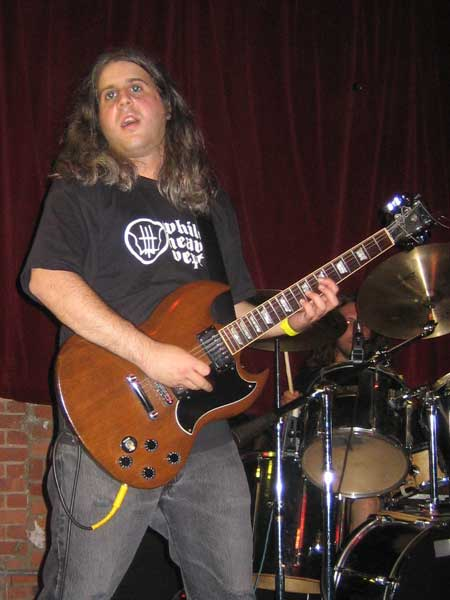
Angelo Tringali

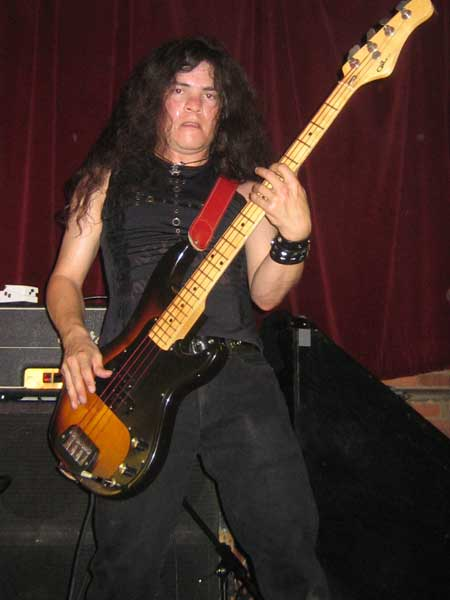
Adrian Maestas

=== Former members ===
- Omar Herd – vocals
- Chris Haa – guitars
- Andrew Sebba – guitars
- John Cobbett (Hammers of Misfortune, Ludicra, Gwar) – guitars
- Justin Phelps – bass/founding member
- Justin Post – bass
- Scott Beach – bass
- Jon Torres (Ulysses Siren, Angel Witch, Warning S.F., I4NI, Lȧȧz Rockit, Heathen) – bass
- Jim Mack (Black Goat (US), Weakling) – bass
- Dave Passmore – drums
- Stu Kane – drums
- Greg Haa (Isen Torr) – drums
- Antoine Reuben (Hadan, Black Goat, Weakling) – drums
- Harry Cantwell (Bosse-de-Nage) – drums
- Addison Filipczyk – drums
- Jeff Griffin - drums

== Discography ==
- The Lord Weird Slough Feg (1996)
- Twilight of the Idols (1999)
- Down Among the Deadmen (2000)
- Traveller (2003)
- Atavism (2005)
- Hardworlder (2007)
- The Slay Stack Grows (2008) (compilation)
- Ape Uprising! (2009)
- The Animal Spirits (2010)
- Made in Poland (live, 2011)
- Digital Resistance (2014)
- New Organon (2019)
- Traveller Supplement 1: The Ephemeral Glades (2025) (EP)
