= Gates of Fire (album) =

Studio album by Manilla Road
- Released: October 12, 2005
- Recorded: Midgard Sounds Labs, Wichita, Kansas
- Genre: Heavy metal
- Length: 72:12
- Label: Battle Cry
- Producer: Mark Shelton

Manilla Road chronology
Mark of the Beast (2002)	Gates of Fire (2005)	Voyager (2008)

Professional ratings
Review scores
Source	Rating
AllMusic	3.5/5 stars
The Metal Observer	(9/10)

Gates of Fire is an album released by American heavy metal band Manilla Road on October 12, 2005. It is divided into a trilogy: "The Frost's Giant Daughter", inspired by the story of the same name written by Robert E. Howard; "Out of the Ashes", based on Virgil's Aeneid; and "Gates of Fire", inspired by the stand of King Leonidas and his Spartans at the battle of Thermopylae.

== Track listing ==
All songs written by Mark Shelton.

=== The Frost-Giant's Daughter ===
1. "Riddle of Steel" – 7:08
2. "Behind the Veil" – 3:43
3. "When Giants Fall" – 5:28

=== Out of the Ashes ===
4. "The Fall of Iliam" – 14:47
5. "Imperious Rise" – 6:08
6. "Rome" – 11:02

=== Gates of Fire ===
7. "Stand of the Spartans" – 5:36
8. "Betrayal" – 8:26
9. "Epitaph to the King" – 9:54

== Credits ==
- Mark Shelton – acoustic and electric guitars, vocals
- Cory Christner – drums
- Harvey Patrick – bass guitar
- Bryan Patrick – vocals
