= Atlantis Rising =

Studio album by Manilla Road
- Released: 2001
- Genre: Heavy metal; thrash metal; progressive metal
- Length: 56:58
- Label: Iron Glory

Manilla Road chronology
The Circus Maximus (1992)	Atlantis Rising (2001)	Spiral Castle (2002)

Professional ratings
Review scores
Source	Rating
AllMusic	4/5 stars

Atlantis Rising is a concept album released by American heavy metal band Manilla Road in 2001. Its content revolves around the lost continent of Atlantis re-emerging and the resulting war between the Æsir and Great Old Ones over the continent.

== Themes and reception ==
The album was a reunion release after the band dissolved ten years earlier, according to metal.de. It met with a mixed reception. Metal.de criticized the mix and recording quality, but praised the song material itself, calling it a decent comeback album. Rockhard.de praised the album, saying productive was predictive but perfect for the band's traditional metal sound. The review called the track "Resurrection" the best song of the year.

Allmusic's Eduardo Rivadavia called it one of the "finest albums of the cult-heavy metal heroes' long career," calling the band's sound vibrant and epic. The album's lyrics link stories such as the legend of Atlantis, the Cthulhu Mythos, Greek and Norse deities "like some outrageously mishmash omnibus," according to Rivadavia.

== Track listing ==
1. "Megalodon" – 8:20
2. "Lemuria" – 2:50
3. "Atlantis Rising" – 7:01
4. "Sea Witch" – 4:29
5. "Resurrection" – 6:38
6. "Decimation" – 6:38
7. "Flight of the Ravens" – 2:11
8. "March of the Gods" – 5:09
9. "Siege of Atland" – 4:53
10. "War of the Gods" – 8:49

== Credits ==
- Mark Shelton – guitars and vocals
- Scott Peters – drums and drum arrangements
- Bryan Patrick – vocals, drum arrangements (drums on "Sea Witch")
- Mark Anderson – bass guitars and six-string classic guitar
- Darby Michael Pentecost – lead vocals (title track "Atlantis Rising")
