= The August Engine =

Studio album by Hammers of Misfortune
- Released: September 16, 2003
- Recorded: December 2001 – April 2002 at Louder Studios, San Francisco, California and Trakworx, South San Francisco
- Genre: Heavy metal, progressive metal
- Length: 44:26
- Label: Cruz Del Sur Music, Metal Blade Records

Hammers of Misfortune chronology
The Bastard (2001)	The August Engine (2003)	The Locust Years (2006)

The August Engine is the second studio album by the American progressive/heavy metal band Hammers of Misfortune. The recording of the album finished in April 2002. Initially the band had difficulties finding a record label willing to publish the album, so it did not see an official release until September 16, 2003 through Italian record label Cruz Del Sur Music. The album was later reissued in 2010 under Metal Blade Records.

== Themes and lyrical content ==
Guitarist John Cobbett describes the album and its difficult release as follows:

"The August Engine was a concept album, and it’s missing several very large pieces in its released form. It was something I’d set out to be something on the scale of Pink Floyd’s The Wall. I wanted to do a huge record. And I did it, and no one was interested. In fact, I shelved that record, literally gave up on it. Nobody wanted to put it out. It was dead in the water. It was dead to me. So we started working on The Locust Years. Some of the songs had never been mixed or mastered—the album was collapsing under its own weight. It was Enrico from Cruz Del Sur in Italy that eventually inquired about The August Engine. That was after I had edited it down to its current length and given up on it. He ended up releasing it and Locust Years."

The album revolves around a continued conversation between a microcosm and a macrocosm, where the latter is represented by the "August Engine", which is referred to as a society of individuals not too dissimilar from a religious cult, while the former takes the position of an individual caught up in the engine's great design. The inspiration for this concept stems from Cobbett's dissatisfaction with the state of music in the early 2000s;

"The concept itself had a lot to do with music as something that I loved and something that was dying. It dealt with what happens when you get into a music scene. The excitement of meeting all these people, and the disappointment when you realize it’s just another fucking scene, and these people are — some of them — not good people. Your idealism starts to suffer. I was watching what was happening to pop music at the time, and it was just disgusting. I can’t remember what it was, but it’s the same thing that’s happening now. The autotune. Most of the radio hits you hear now don’t even have an actual musical instrument on them, at all. It’s all done by sequencing on computers. And no, a computer is not a musical instrument. A computer just executes instructions. Without going too far into that, I was disgusted by what was happening to music, and I still am, but I was so hurt about it that I put it on an album. At the end of the album, the entity that’s being put on trial is hard music itself, condemned and chopped up into pieces, destroyed."

Cobett also describes the tracks "Rainfall" and "A Room and a Riddle" as a metaphor for life itself. "Rainfall" in particular seems to be about the insignificance of individual human lives and how they can easily blend together like raindrops to form an "ocean".

== Track listing ==
All tracks are written by John Cobbett, except where noted.

No.	Title	Length
1.	"The August Engine, Part 1" (music by Cobbett and Chewy Marzolo)	4:53
2.	"Rainfall"	3:12
3.	"A Room and a Riddle"	5:13
4.	"The August Engine, Part 2" (music by Cobbett, Marzolo; lyrics by Cobbett)	8:57
5.	"Insect"	5:19
6.	"Doomed Parade"	5:40
7.	"The Trial and the Grave"	11:13

== Personnel ==
=== Hammers of Misfortune ===
- John Cobbett – guitar
- Chewy Marzolo – drums
- Janis Tanaka – bass guitar, vocals
- Mike Scalzi – vocals

=== Additional musicians ===
- Lorraine Rath – all vocals on "Rainfall"
- Kris Force – violin on "Rainfall"
- Sitara Kapoor – cello on "Rainfall"

=== Production ===
- Tim Green – engineer and mixing at Louder Studios, San Francisco, California
- Justin Wies – engineer, mixing, mastering at Trakworx, South San Francisco, California
- John Cobbett – cover drawings and design
- temnO un.art – booklet layout
