= Spiral Castle =

Studio album by Manilla Road
- Released: November 4, 2002
- Recorded: Midgard Sound Labs, Wichita, Kansas
- Genre: Heavy metal
- Length: 46:29
- Label: Iron Glory
- Producer: Manilla Road

Manilla Road chronology
Atlantis Rising (2001)	Spiral Castle (2002)	Mark of the Beast (2002)

Professional ratings
Review scores
Source	Rating
AllMusic	link
EnslavedByMetal.com	10+/10
The Metal Observer	9/10

Spiral Castle is the twelfth album by American heavy metal band Manilla Road, released in 2002 by Iron Glory Records.

== Production and reception ==
Although Atlantis Rising had been released under the name Manilla Road, it had actually been intended as a Mark Shelton solo project, while Spiral Castle was actually the first album released by the newly reformed Manilla Road.

It was praised by Eduardo Rivadavia of AllMusic for continuing with the "majestic metal" of their album two years prior, Atlantis Rising. Lyrics are laced with fantasy references, including Norse mythology references such as Ragnarok and Bifrost. Metal.de gave it a mixed review, calling it a solid disc, but not with the full energy as the band's earlier albums.

Metal Hammer included the album cover on their list of "50 most hilariously ugly rock and metal album covers ever".

== Track listing ==
1. "Gateway to the Sphere" – 2:30
2. "Spiral Castle" – 8:26
3. "Shadow" – 4:24
4. "Seven Trumpets" – 5:19
5. "Merchants of Death" – 10:53
6. "Born Upon the Soul" – 7:17
7. "Sands of Time" – 7:40

== Credits ==
- Mark Shelton – guitars, vocals
- Scott Peters – drums, percussion, vocals
- Bryan Patrick – vocals
- Mark Anderson – bass
- Momadon – violin on "Sands of Time"
