= The Circus Maximus =

Studio album by Manilla Road (Mark Shelton solo project)
- Released: 1992
- Recorded: Miller Studio, North Newton, Kansas Roadster Roadhouse, Wichita, Kansas
- Genre: Heavy metal
- Length: 68:21
- Label: Black Dragon
- Producer: Larry Funk; Mark Shelton

Manilla Road (Mark Shelton solo project) chronology
The Courts of Chaos (1990)	The Circus Maximus (1992)	Atlantis Rising (2001)

Professional ratings
Review scores
Source	Rating
AllMusic	2.5/5 stars

The Circus Maximus is an album released under the name of American heavy metal band Manilla Road in 1992, after the band had first split up. The album contains the work of Manilla Road founder and frontman Mark Shelton who assembled a new band named Circus Maximus. However, Shelton's label, Black Dragon Records, added the Manilla Road logo. The sound and style is very different than the rest of Manilla Road's material.

== Production and reception ==
Manilla Road had dissolved during the sessions for The Courts of Chaos, and lead songwriter, vocalist and guitarist Mark Shelton began working on a new project. The recording process for the album involved his high school friends Andrew Coss and Aaron Brown, with the new band to be named Circus Maximus. However, his record label Black Dragon released the album as the work of Manilla Road and named it The Circus Maximus instead, despite the project having an entirely different sound. According to AllMusic, many of the tracks "showcased bassist/composer Coss's remarkably soulful, Glenn Hughes-styled pipes to perfection, while providing unprecedented dynamic space over which Shelton could expand his six-string soloing vocabulary." The group did insist on calling themselves Circus Maximus for live performances even after the album release as a Manilla Road work, but the group dissolved as Manilla Road was reformed several years later.

== Track listing ==
1. "Throne of Blood" – 5:01
2. "Lux Aeterna" – 8:01
3. "Spider" – 7:15
4. "Murder by Degrees" – 4:28
5. "No Sign From Above" – 5:23
6. "In Gein We Trust" – 6:47
7. "Flesh and Fury" – 4:11
8. "No Touch" – 6:20
9. "Hack It Off" – 4:04
10. "Forbidden Zone" – 8:41
11. "She's Fading" – 8:00

== Credits ==
Manilla Road

- Mark Shelton – vocals, guitar
- Andrew Coss – bass, keyboards on "Lux Aeterna", vocals
- Aaron Brown – drums, vocals

Production

- mixed at Miller Studio, North Newton, Kansas
- Larry Funk – engineer
- Aaron Brown – cover art
