= Mystification (album) =

Studio album by Manilla Road
- Released: August 1987
- Recorded: 1986
- Studios: All Green, Memphis, Tennessee; Miller, North Newton, Kansas
- Genres: Heavy metal; thrash metal
- Length: 43:02
- Label: Black Dragon
- Producers: Manilla Road, Paul Zaleski, Larry Funk

Manilla Road chronology
The Deluge (1986)	Mystification (1987)	Out of the Abyss (1988)

Mystification is the sixth studio album by American heavy metal band Manilla Road, released in 1987. It was re-released in 2000 on Sentinel Steel Records.

The album cover art was inspired by the work of Edgar Allan Poe, specifically "The Masque of the Red Death".

== Critical reception ==
Professional ratings
Review scores
Source	Rating
AllMusic	3/5 stars
Chronicles of Chaos	9/10
Crash	2–3/6

AllMusic wrote that "bandleader Mark Shelton's stirring guitar work often comes to the rescue, spinning beautiful melodic yarns across the near epic 'Children of the Night' and the Haley's Comet-inspired 'Dragon Star', while additional album standouts such as 'Spirits of the Dead' and the title track finally display the clever combination of melodic savvy and compelling oft-spiritual lyrics to get them through."

== Track listing ==
1. "Haunted Palace" – 4:23
2. "Spirits of the Dead" – 4:24
3. "Valley of Unrest" – 3:41
4. "Mystification" – 5:35
5. "Masque of the Red Death" – 5:21
6. "Up from the Crypt" – 3:02
7. "Children of the Night" – 6:55
8. "Dragon Star" – 5:56
9. "Death by the Hammer" – 3:45
- The 2000 re-release has a different track list, and includes the song "The Asylum" as the tenth track.

== Credits ==
Manilla Road

- Mark Shelton – lead vocals, guitars
- Scott Park – bass guitar
- Randy Foxe – backing vocals, drums and percussion

Production

- Paul Zaleski – producer
- Larry Funk – co-producer, edit
- Manilla Road – producer, arranger, edit, concept
- L. Ryan Hendricks – concept, artwork
