= Playground of the Damned =

Studio album by Manilla Road
- Released: October 25, 2011
- Genre: Heavy metal
- Length: 46:47
- Label: Shadow Kingdom

Manilla Road chronology
| Voyager (2008) | Playground of the Damned (2011) | Mysterium (2013) |

Professional ratings
Review scores
| Source | Rating |
|---|---|
| Allmusic | 3/5 stars |
| Blabbermouth | (8/10) |

Playground of the Damned is the fifteenth studio album by American heavy metal band Manilla Road. It was released on October 25, 2011, on Shadow Kingdom Records in CD format and on High Roller Records in LP format.

== Track listing ==
1. "Jackhammer" - 5:27
2. "Into the Maelström" - 4:47
3. "Playground of the Damned" - 4:27
4. "Grindhouse" - 7:51
5. "Abattoir de la Mort" - 7:15
6. "Fire of Asshurbanipal" - 4:41
7. "Brethren of the Hammer" - 5:03
8. "Art of War" - 7:16

== Credits ==
- Mark Shelton - Guitars (6 & 12 string), Vocals (lead & backing)
- Bryan Patrick - Vocals (lead & backing)
- Cory Christner - Drums
- Vince Golman - Bass
