= 17th Street (album) =

Studio album by Hammers of Misfortune
- Released: October 25, 2011
- Genres: Heavy metal, progressive metal
- Length: 49:46
- Label: Metal Blade Records

Hammers of Misfortune chronology
Fields/Church of Broken Glass (2008)	17th Street (2011)	Dead Revolution (2016)

17th Street is the fifth studio album by heavy metal band Hammers of Misfortune. It was released in 2011 on Metal Blade Records.

== Track listing ==
No.	Title	Length
1.	"317"	3:39
2.	"17th Street"	4:40
3.	"The Grain"	7:13
4.	"Staring (The 31st Floor)"	3:47
5.	"The Day the City Died"	4:30
6.	"Romance Valley"	5:18
7.	"Summer Tears"	6:36
8.	"Grey Wednesday"	3:58
9.	"Going Somewhere"	10:05

== Personnel ==
- John Cobbett: guitars
- Joe Hutton: lead vocals
- Leila Abdul-Rauf: guitars, vocals
- Sigrid Sheie: piano, keyboards, backing vocals
- Max Barnett: bass guitar
- Chewy Marzolo: drums, percussion
