= Voyager (Manilla Road album) =

Studio album by Manilla Road
- Released: February 29, 2008
- Genre: Heavy metal
- Length: 64:03
- Label: My Graveyard Productions

Manilla Road chronology
Gates of Fire (2005)	Voyager (2008)	Playground of the Damned (2011)

Professional ratings
Review scores
Source	Rating
Allmusic	(Not Rated) Allmusic review by Eduardo Rivadavia
Dangerdog	(4.5/5)
Lords of Metal E-Zine	(75/100)

Voyager is an album released by heavy metal band Manilla Road in 2008.

== Track listing ==
1. "Tomb of the Serpent King / Butchers of the Sea" - 9:02
2. "Frost and Fire" - 6:02
3. "Tree of Life" - 8:00
4. "Blood Eagle" - 6:11
5. "Voyager" - 9:31
6. "Eye of the Storm" - 4:40
7. "Return of the Serpent King" - 8:04
8. "Conquest" - 4:37
9. "Totentanz (The Dance of Death)" - 7:57

== Credits ==
- Mark Shelton – vocals, guitars, synthesizers, Cathedral organ
- Cory Christner – drums
- Harvey Patrick – bass, backing vocals
