= Crystal Logic =

Studio album by Manilla Road
- Released: December 1983
- Recorded: May–June 1983
- Studio: Miller, North Newton, Kansas
- Genre: Heavy metal
- Length: 44:18
- Label: Roadster
- Producer: Mark Mazur

Manilla Road chronology
Metal (1982)	Crystal Logic (1983)	Open the Gates (1985)

Crystal Logic is the third studio album by the American heavy metal band Manilla Road, released in December 1983 (and reissued in 2002). On this album the band fully embraced heavy metal, leaving behind the space, progressive and hard rock influences which could be found on the two previous albums.

== Critical reception ==
Professional ratings
Review scores
Source	Rating
AllMusic	4.5/5 stars

In Metal Forces, Bernard Doe wrote, "Manilla Road suffer the same problem as Brocas Helm in sounding a little dated in style. But let's not take away the band's musicianship which is quite excellent throughout, especially guitarist Mark Shelton's riffing and soloing".

In 2005, Crystal Logic was ranked number 344 in Rock Hard's book The 500 Greatest Rock & Metal Albums of All Time.

Aaron Lariviere of The A.V. Club named it one of 1983's "excellent but tragically underrated records".

== Track listing ==
All songs written by Mark Shelton.

No.	Title	Length
1.	"Prologue"	1:35
2.	"Necropolis"	3:10
3.	"Crystal Logic"	6:01
4.	"Feeling Free Again"	2:48
5.	"The Riddle Master"	4:41
6.	"The Ram"	3:46
7.	"The Veils of Negative Existence"	4:34
8.	"Dreams of Eschaton"	10:24
9.	"Epilogue"	1:55

== Personnel ==
Band

- Mark Shelton – lead vocals, guitars, arrangement
- Scott Park – bass, arrangement
- Rick Fisher – drums, percussion, backing vocals, arrangement

Production

- Larry Funk – engineer
- John Jinks – front cover art
- Cinda Hughes – back cover art
- Manilla Road – front cover design
- Mike Arnold – dust sleeve photo
- Sherry Avett, Mark Shelton – back cover design
- Rollin Murphy - Pyrotechnics
