= Harvey Milk (band) =

American rock band

- Origin: Athens, Georgia, U.S.
- Genres: Doom metal Sludge metal Noise rock Stoner rock Experimental rock
- Years active: 1992–1998, 2006–present
- Labels: Self Rising, Relapse, Reproductive, Tumult, Hydra Head
- Members: Creston Spiers; Stephen Tanner; Kyle Spence
- Past members: Paul Trudeau; Joe Preston

Harvey Milk is an American experimental rock/noise rock band that formed in Athens, Georgia in the early 1990s. While Harvey Milk invariably draws comparisons to the Melvins, due to their penchant for slow, heavy riffs, the band has touched upon such artists as ZZ Top, Led Zeppelin, Leonard Cohen, and Kiss as influences in their music. They even went so far as to perform a live show consisting of nothing but Hank Williams covers. One April Fool's Day gig at the 40 Watt in Athens, they performed R.E.M.'s Reckoning album from beginning to end, while Michael Stipe was in attendance.

== History ==
Harvey Milk formed in 1992, naming themselves after Harvey Milk, the first openly gay politician elected in a major U.S. city. Originally a trio of Creston Spiers, Stephen Tanner, and Paul Trudeau, the band released one album, My Love Is Higher Than Your Assessment of What My Love Could Be, before Trudeau left in 1996. They disbanded in 1998 but reformed in 2006.

In the interim of the breakup and reformation of Harvey Milk members went on to other projects, Kyle Spence joined J Mascis who he was the guitar tech of in J Mascis and The Fog after original drummer George Berz left

On June 3, 2008, Harvey Milk released Life... The Best Game in Town. The band toured the eastern and southern US as well as Germany, England, Belgium, France and Scotland during the Summer of 2008. Life... The Best Game in Town was voted as the best album of 2008 in Rock-A-Rolla magazine writer's poll, although guitarist/vocalist Creston Spiers sees it as the band's worst album.

Since 2013 Kyle Spence has been the drummer for Kurt Vile and the Violators.

== Personnel ==
Current members

- Creston Spiers – vocals, guitar (1992–present)
- Stephen Tanner – bass guitar, guitar (1992–present)
- Kyle Spence – drums (1996–1998, 2007–present)

Former members

- Paul Trudeau – drums (1992–1996, 2006–2007)
- Joe Preston – guitar, bass (2008)

== Discography ==
Studio albums

- My Love Is Higher Than Your Assessment of What My Love Could Be (1994, CD on Yesha/Reissue CD on Relapse 2007)
- Courtesy and Good Will Toward Men (1997, LP on Reproductive, CD on Tumult Records/Reissue CD on Relapse 2007/Reissue LP on Chunklet 2008 (Reissue used original sleeves, but vinyl was pressed on 180 gram audiophile vinyl))
- The Pleaser (1997, CD on Reproductive/Reissue CD on Relapse 2007/LP on Chunklet 2008)
- Special Wishes (2006, LP & CD on Megablade Records)
- Life... The Best Game in Town (2008, CD / 2009, LP on Hydrahead)
- S/T – The Bob Weston Sessions (2009, 300 LP Limited Run on Hydra Head for summer tour with Torche /2010 Remastered CD on Hydrahead)
- A Small Turn of Human Kindness (2010, CD on Hydrahead)

Live releases

- Live WFMU SXSW Showcase At Spiro's In Austin, TX On 3/14/2008 (2008)
- Live at Supersonic (2010, LP on Capsule)
- Reckoning (2023, LP on Chunklet Industries)
- WhaRvEy milK (2026, LP on Chunklet Industries)

Compilation albums

- The Singles (CD 2003)
- The Kelly Sessions (CD 2004)

EPs and Splits

- Hayride/Harvey Milk: Pals Forever (7" 1992)
- Sunshine, Good Times & Fine Wine B/W Women Dig It (7" 1993)
- The Martians/Harvey Milk (7" 1993)
- Yer Mouse Gets My Dander Up (7" 1995)
- I Do Not Know How To Live My Life (7" 1995)
- I've Got A Love (7" 2006)
- Hayride/Harvey Milk: F*#k You Guys (7" 2006)
- Harvey Milk/Wildildlife (7" 2009)

=== DVDs ===
- Anthem (CD+DVD 2006, 2xDVD 2009)
