= The Deluge (Manilla Road album) =

Studio album by Manilla Road
- Released: 1986
- Studio: Miller Studio, North Newton, Kansas
- Genre: Heavy metal
- Length: 38:57
- Label: Black Dragon
- Producer: Jay Merhoff, Manilla Road, Max Merhoff, Rick Fisher, Sherry Avett

Manilla Road chronology
Open the Gates (1985)	The Deluge (1986)	Mystification (1987)

Professional ratings
Review scores
Source	Rating
AllMusic	4.5/5 stars

The Deluge is the fifth album released by the American heavy metal band Manilla Road. It was originally issued in 1986 and re-released in 2001.

== Track listing ==
All songs written by Mark "The Shark" Shelton, except "Morbid Tabernacle", written and performed by Mike Metz.

1. "Dementia" – 3:09
2. "Shadow in the Black" – 5:22
3. "Divine Victim" – 3:09
4. "Hammer of the Witches" – 2:41
5. "Morbid Tabernacle" – 1:53
6. "Isle of the Dead" – 2:53
7. "Taken by Storm" – 3:19
8. "The Deluge" – 8:13
9. "Friction in Mass" – 6:27
10. "Rest in Pieces" – 1:51
- Re-release has a live version of "Dementia" as the eleventh track.

== Credits ==
Band

- Mark Shelton – lead vocals, guitars
- Scott Park – bass
- Randy Foxe – drums and percussion, backing vocals, synthesizer

Production

- Max Merhoff – producer, engineer
- Manilla Road – producer, arrangements
- Jay Merhoff, Rick Fisher and Sherry Avett – producers
- Larry Funk – engineer
- Eric Larnoy – illustration, concept
