= Courtesy and Good Will Toward Men =

Studio album by Harvey Milk
- Released: 1997
- Recorded: December 1995
- Genres: Sludge metal; doom metal
- Length: 70:13
- Label: Reproductive Records

Harvey Milk chronology
My Love Is Higher Than Your Assessment of What My Love Could Be (1995)	Courtesy and Good Will Toward Men (1997)	The Pleaser (1998)

Courtesy and Good Will Toward Men is the second studio album by the Athens, Georgia-based band Harvey Milk, released in 1997. It originally came out in a small production run of double gatefold vinyl. The album was reissued by Relapse Records in 2006.

Andrew Earles, in Gimme Indie Rock: 500 Essential American Underground Rock Albums 1981-1996, wrote that the album "can claim the distinction of being the most beautiful, bizarre, challenging, melancholy, and, above all, heaviest album ever to come out of America's rock and metal undergrounds of the '80s and '90s."

== Production ==
It was the band's intention to craft a "classic rock" album. "One of Us Cannot Be Wrong" is a cover of the Leonard Cohen song.

== Critical reception ==
Professional ratings
Review scores
Source	Rating
AllMusic	4.5/5 stars
Stylus Magazine	A

Trouser Press wrote that "the sparse, nearly minimalist arrangements led by pianos and crashing rhythms on Courtesy and Good Will Toward Men threaten to implode throughout the vinyl-only album’s four sides." The Chicago Tribune thought that "Milk's masterstroke of weirdness vice-twists slow-time signatures, soft-loud contrasts and spatial geometrics into category-defying forms that have yet to be imitated."

AllMusic wrote: "Neither strictly metal nor noise nor indie rock, but incorporating elements of all three, Harvey Milk's music remains an almost unclassifiable, love it or hate it proposition." Stylus Magazine stated the album "ebbs-and-flows between monstrosity and mystery, brevity and endlessness, repetition and experimentation, but its beauty is an unwavering constant." Nashville Scene called the album "thrilling, unpredictable and indescribable," writing that "of all the Melvins-worshiping bands that have followed since, no one but the Melvins have been more Melvinsian." The A.V. Club concluded that the album "portrays some of the harshest aspects of American life while functioning as a profound illustration of what heavy music, in its smartest and most deliberate forms, can do."

== Track listing ==
1. "Pinnochio's Example" – 10:28
2. "Brown Water" – 8:57
3. "Plastic Eggs" – 6:28
4. "My Broken Heart Will Never Mend" – 10:44
5. "I Feel Miserable" – 3:49
6. "The Lord's Prayer" – 3:14
7. "Sunshine (No Sun) into the Sun" – 7:22
8. "Go Back to France" – 3:04
9. "A Good Thing Gone" – 3:55
10. "One of Us Cannot Be Wrong" – 5:17
11. "The Boy with Bosoms" – 6:59

== Personnel ==
- Vocals, guitar: Creston Spiers
- Bass: Stephen Tanner
- Drums: Pauly Trudeau
