= Exploit (video game) =

2008 video game

- Developer: Gregory Weir
- Platform: Browser game
- Release: March 4, 2009
- Genre: Puzzle

Exploit is a Flash browser game by Gregory Weir. It was published on March 4, 2009. As of October 2011, Exploit has been played over 700,000 times.

== Gameplay ==
Each level consists of a rectangular grid with different elements (nodes) in some of the squares. The player controls orange "ports" which shoot "packets" into the grid. The different elements react to the packets in different ways. The goal is to hit one of the green "Root Nodes" in each level, though most levels have got only one Root Node. The other elements are red "Blocker Nodes", purple "Divider Nodes", yellow "Buffer Nodes", blue "Directory Nodes", cyan "Latch Nodes", white "Port Knock Keys" and lines connecting Buffer Nodes to Blocker Nodes. In each chapter, you can use one Distributed Denial of Service (DDOS). If a chapter is too difficult, the DDOS lets you skip this level.

Apart from the story mode, there is a tutorial, a challenge mode, and a puzzle editor. Users can publish levels made with the editor. The main game (story mode) consists of three chapters, with over 50 levels. Between the levels, you get e-mails, by a character named "sk3tch" and other sources. The events of the story are set to the fictive dictatorship "Locha", Los Angeles and Charlotte, North Carolina (Gregory Weirs hometown).

== Plot ==
The main character, a computer security cracker, get an e-mail from one of his friends using the nickname "sk3tch". He is asked to break into the computer network of the nation Locha, a fictive military junta with a resemblance to Myanmar, as a test for his hacking skills. While drilling deeper into Locha's firewalls, the player discovers that a famous Lochan blogger and political activist, Li Yolei, has been recently arrested and awaits execution for "trahison and Western propaganda." Using their skills, sk3tch and the player manage to free him and his cellmate Gadao Koi, another inmate in death row for suspected terrorism, and to have them board a plane to Los Angeles; but as soon as they land in American soil, the FBI arrest and send them to the Camp Zulu detention camp on one of the Florida Keys (which opened after the closure of Guantanamo Bay), suspecting them to be terrorists as the relation between Locha and the United Nations becomes sour.

The player manages to free the two prisoners and send them to sk3tch's house by bus, only to find that only Yolei arrived. After some research, sk3tch discovers that Gadao was a Lochan spy, who used Li's evasion to get into America for an unknown purpose. It is later found that his goal is to commit a terrorist attack on the headquarters of Ameribank, a multinational bank located in Charlotte, by using thermite bombs. Gadao also hacked the central server of Charlotte's fire and emergency department to delay any help, to maximize the damage and casualties of the attack. While sk3tch warns the FBI, the player manages to fix the fire department system, warn security about Gadao (who is already in the building, disguised as a delivery boy) and traps him in an elevator when cornered by the FBI and security. Gadao accidentally kills himself by using thermite to break through the elevator, which catches fire and burns him to death.

After finding documents about the true goal of Gadao, the US decides to grant American citizenship to Li, and when the UN decides of new sanctions against Locha, sk3tch and the player celebrate their victory by discussing new targets to hack for the good cause.

== Reception ==
Kyle Moore of Jay is Games stated "...this is going to be a good year for both Weir and all of us who enjoy great games." Michael Rose of IndieGames.com stated Exploit is "...a great little game..." which initially appears complicated, but leaves the player feeling "...rather clever from figuring it out." Tom Fronczak of Destructoid praised Exploit as "...one hell of a fulfilling flash game", describing the game's music as "decent" and highlighting the option for players to create their own levels. Despite this he stated that the style of game has been seen before, but that the plot sets it apart since it contains internet-derived humor while maintaining focus on "...the serious topic of net censorship."
