= Gregory Avery-Weir =

American game designer and writer

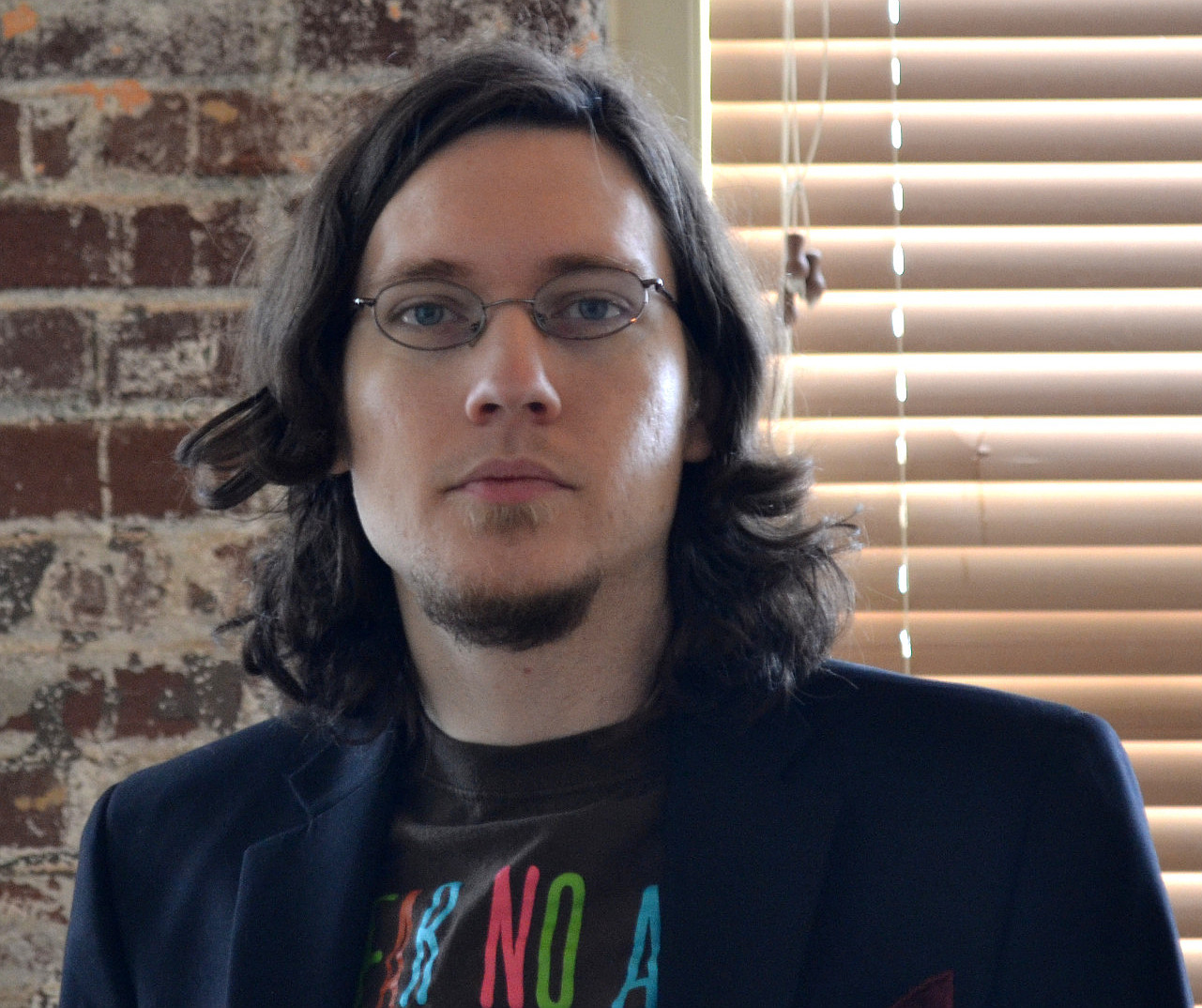
- Occupations: Game developer, writer
- Known for: Developer of Flash Games / writer for GameSetWatch

Gregory Avery-Weir is an American game designer and writer, best known for the 2009 browser game The Majesty of Colors. Avery-Weir lives in Charlotte, North Carolina, United States.

== Early life and education ==
Avery-Weir received little formal art training, other than occasional art and cartooning classes while growing up. At college they produced a weekly comic in their college newspaper called “The Absolute Sum of All Evil”.

== Career ==
Up until 2008, Avery-Weir worked as a web developer for RealEstate.com. During 2008 and 2009, Avery-Weir undertook paid work writing for game website GameSetWatch. Prior to their fully released games, Avery-Weir developed hobby game projects in Logowriter, HyperCard, DOS batch scripts, Megazeux, and Inform 6 and 7. Avery-Weir maintains a blog called Ludus Novus.

Avery-Weir wrote most of their games in the language ActionScript 3 for the Flash platform. Some of Avery-Weir's games have been funded through a bid-based model, whereby companies including Kongregate and Armor Games would bid to sponsor the games following development.

== Influences ==
Avery-Weir has stated that Shadow of the Colossus, Planescape: Torment, Knytt, and H. P. Lovecraft have influenced their work.

== Games ==
- Necropolis (2008)
- The Majesty of Colors (2008)
- Bars of Black and White (2009)
- Exploit (2009)
- Sugarcore (2009)
- The Bryant Collection (2009)
- How to Raise a Dragon (2009)
- Silent Conversation (2009)
- Paladin 0 (2009)
- The Mold Fairy (2009)
- Backup (2009)
- Procrastination (2009)
- Babies Dream of Dead Worlds (2010)
- Waves (2010)
- Looming (2010)
- Narthex (2010)
- The Day (2010)
- A Ride Home (2011)
- Beneath the Waves (2011)
- Passing the Ball (2011)
- The Whispering Thing (2013)
- Rats Under My Skin (2014)
- Promenade (2014)
- Concision (2015)
- Ossuary (2015)
- Cultivating Insurgency (2019)

== See also ==
- Anna Anthropy
