= The Majesty of Colors =

2008 video game

- Developer: Gregory Weir
- Release: December 2008
- Genres: Puzzle, artgame

The Majesty of Colors (also known as (I Fell In Love With) The Majesty of Colors) is a 2008 Flash browser game by Gregory Weir. Weir has described the game as "pixel-horror".

== Gameplay ==
The user is a tentacled sea creature and they interact with humans, creatures, and objects in and around an area of sea. The player's actions can be benevolent towards the humans and creatures, or destructive. The actions of the player determine which of five different endings will be shown.

== Development ==
The game uses a blocky pixel art style. Said Weir, "What I try to do is fit the art to the game. Majesty is really a very simple game, with simple controls and a simple-minded protagonist, so I went for blocky pixel art, which is both easy to make and evokes a simpler era of video games." Although the visuals seem simple and low-tech, they are actually more complex than they look, making use of alpha blending and large moving textures. The most complex visual element is the creature's tentacle, which uses an inverse kinematic system more commonly used in 3D animation.

Weir claims to have been inspired by a competition on indie game forum TIGSource themed around H. P. Lovecraft's commonplace book. Says Weir, "I had the idea of an enormous creature from beneath the waves discovering the world above. When I think of the deep ocean, I imagine darkness and a lack of color. When I think of color at its simplest, balloons come to mind: floating spheres in primary shades."

In deciding on the art style, Weir drew inspiration from Daniel Benmergui's Flash game I Wish I Were the Moon, "which had similarly surreal premises and simple gameplay". Weir decided that a similar "chunky, low-res pixel style" would work well for Majesty. Original designs involved a creature with two independently controlled tentacles, but during development Weir cut the control down to a single limb, suggesting but not showing additional tentacles through the position of the creature's body.

The finished game presents some of the story through evocative prose. However, Weir has since stated he feels this was a mistake, saying without text it would have been a "cleaner, purer game". "In retrospect," he said, "I probably should have given the player more credit, and gone lighter on the narration text."

Weir claims that development of Majesty cost him nothing other than his personal living expenses. The game was coded in the Flex compiler and IDE FlashDevelop, which are freely available. The sounds used in the game were obtained from website soundsnap.com, which provides free sound effects and loops. The game art was created by Weir in the open-source graphics editor GIMP. Weir obtained sponsorship for the game by posting it on the FlashGameLicence website and directly emailing potential sponsors. Weir stated that although he is pleased with his experiences with FlashGameLicence, most of the sponsorship interest in the game came as a result of his direct emails.

The game was first posted on FlashGameLicence on November 15, 2008 and a sponsorship deal with Kongregate worth "several thousand dollars" was finalized a month later. Weir claims the sponsorship money, when combined with advertising revenue and a secondary site-locked sponsorship, represents "over a hundred dollars for each hour [Weir] spent on the game".

== Reception ==
The Majesty of Colors was critically well received and gained endorsements on sites ranging from Kotaku to Penny Arcade. Said Weir, "I think that Majesty’s appeal is that it provides a very unified aesthetic, and makes players feel what it would be like to be a titanic, tentacled horror from beneath the waves who really only wants to be loved."

Kotaku's Maggie Greene called Majesty an "artistic timewaster" and "a weird, lovely little game". Penny Arcade's Jerry Holkins described it as "an electronic poem". Jay Is Games noted Majesty's similarity to I Wish I Were The Moon, but thought that Majesty was more compelling because its interface was "more concrete and personal" and because of the strength of its narration. Jay Is Games also praised Majesty's pixel art and its strong focus on emotion and atmosphere, with the only criticism being a disappointment that the game didn't support more unscripted interactions between the sea creature and its environment.

The Majesty of Colors was nominated for "Best Game" in the 2008 Tank Awards at Newgrounds, and nominated for "Most Creative Game" at the 2009 Mochi Awards at that year's Flash Gaming Summit. Daniel Kronovet of the Daily Californian awarded it a "Krony Award", calling it "beautiful".

By July 6, 2009, the game had been played almost 1.5 million times.
