= Mysterium (Manilla Road album) =

Studio album by Manilla Road
- Released: February 1, 2013
- Genre: Heavy metal
- Length: 49:45
- Label: Golden Core-ZYX, Shadow Kingdom

Manilla Road chronology
Playground of the Damned (2011)	Mysterium (2013)	The Blessed Curse (2015)

Professional ratings
Review scores
Source	Rating
Blabbermouth	(7/10)
Metal Crypt	(4/5)

Mysterium is the sixteenth studio album by American heavy metal band Manilla Road. It was released on February 1, 2013 in on both Golden Core-ZYX and Shadow Kingdom Records in CD format and on High Roller Records in LP format.

== Track listing ==
1. "The Grey God Passes" - 4:05
2. "Stand Your Ground" - 2:57
3. "The Battle Of Bonchester Bridge" - 4:29
4. "Hermitage" - 6:02
5. "Do What Thou Will" - 4:09
6. "Only The Brave" - 3:37
7. "Hallowed Be Thy Grave" - 4:37
8. "The Fountain" - 4:28
9. "The Calling" - 4:00
10. "Mysterium" - 11:21

== Personnel ==
- Mark Shelton – guitars, vocals
- Bryan Patrick – vocals
- Andreas Neuderth – drums
- Josh Castillo – bass
