= Ape Uprising! =

2009 studio album by Slough Feg

Studio album by Slough Feg
- Released: June 2, 2009
- Genre: Heavy metal, folk metal, power metal
- Length: 37:33
- Label: Cruz del Sur
- Producer: Justin Phelps, Mike Scalzi, Justin Weis

Slough Feg chronology
Hardworlder (2007)	Ape Uprising! (2009)	The Animal Spirits (2010)

Professional ratings
Review scores
Source	Rating
AllMusic	4.5/5 stars

Ape Uprising! is the seventh studio album released by American heavy metal band Slough Feg (formerly The Lord Weird Slough Feg). A vinyl edition was released in 2009 by Iron Kodex Records. 666 copies were pressed, the first 150 on brown/yellow/orange haze vinyl.

== Track listing ==
No.	Title	Length
1.	"The Hunchback of Notre Doom"	4:47
2.	"Overborne"	2:53
3.	"Ape Uprising"	10:02
4.	"Simian Manifesto"	4:09
5.	"Shakedown at the Six"	3:51
6.	"White Cousin"	3:09
7.	"Ape Outro"	3:17
8.	"Nasty Hero"	5:25
