= Digital Resistance =

2014 studio album by Slough Feg

Studio album by Slough Feg
- Released: February 17, 2014
- Genre: Heavy metal, stoner metal, progressive metal, folk metal
- Length: 40:41
- Label: Metal Blade
- Producer: Mike Scalzi and Justin Weis

Slough Feg chronology
The Animal Spirits (2011)	Digital Resistance (2014)	New Organon (2019)

Digital Resistance is the ninth studio album by American heavy metal band Slough Feg. Released on February 17, 2014 by Metal Blade Records, the album was well-received and has been praised for its creative use of traditional metal themes inspired by Iron Maiden and Thin Lizzy.

== Recording ==
The album took approximately nine months to record, although the recording itself occurred "sporadically". Frontman Mike Scalzi suggested that the recording "was not different from any other album" except for his use of the organ, with all of the songs "written with the band in the rehearsal space just like our other albums". However, he admitted that "the singing took forever because my voice is getting old and decrepit, and was never really suited for metal in the first place. I have a crooners voice, or if I’d worked at it a little maybe a choir voice, but not a high pitched metal voice...but I love metal, so I try to sing like Freddie Mercury and fail...and end up sounding like Neil Diamond on steroids. What can I say?"

== Theme ==
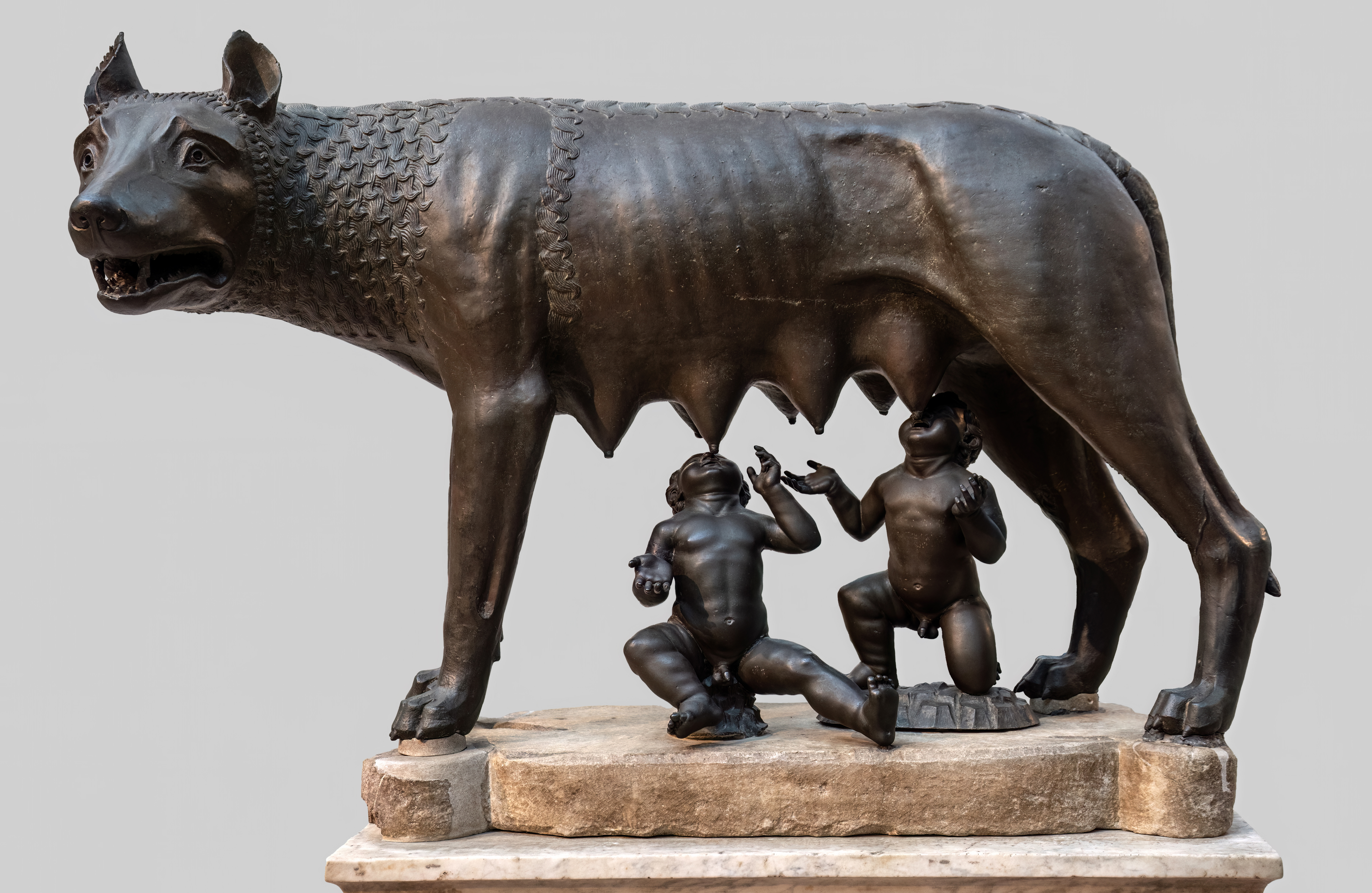
Image of She-Wolf suckling Romulus and Remus

The album cover features a statue of Romulus and Remus, the mythological founders of Rome, suckling a she-wolf set against a dystopian background. As Mike Scalzi explained, the cover places "Romulus and Remus in some destroyed civilization. It's a very vague reference to what the album is about. It's sort of mysterious...I wanted a civilization in ruins much like the Kiss cover of Destroyer". Scalzi said that the cover is illustrative of the album's technophobic concerns with impact of digital technology upon society, which were informed by his experiences as a philosophy teacher.

While the album's anti-technology orientation, according to Grayson Currin of Pitchfork, "seems almost painfully obvious for Slough Feg", he praised how Scalzi "spin[s] his rant toward a surprisingly broad" critique of "how electronics have turned well-meaning and intelligent people into facile consumers coldly following the orders of a screen". Scalzi suggested that technology has changed how people learn:

"I see 18 to 20 year old kids and their habits and patterns and how they learn, or don't learn. It's weird what's happening. This new generation of 20 year olds don't feel the need to rebel the way we did. They are more complacent, which scares me. They seem content to just stare at screens all day. I find this somewhat disturbing: growing up for my generation compared to being an adult, and seeing kids grow up in this news technological generation. We are getting lazy and slothful and quite flabby as a species, physically and mentally. Perhaps this is inevitable for some, but I certainly don’t want to go that way myself. I don’t have all the answers, but I would hope that my music would make people get off their asses and simply assert themselves. Do something with yourself!"

He described as lyrics as "very extreme in order to be dramatic", in order to convey his fear that "digital technology will in fact find its way eventually into our biology, and already has found its way into our mentality".

== Reception ==
Professional ratings
Aggregate scores
Source	Rating
Metacritic	81/100
Review scores
Source	Rating
AllMusic	4/5 stars
Metal Injection	
Pitchfork	8.1/10

According to Metacritic, the album has received "universal acclaim". Grayson Currin of Pitchfork praised the album's songs for "overflow[ing] with two-guitar pirouettes and resplendent hooks, dynamic surges and appropriate aggression", in which Scalzi's maturity has become an asset that illuminates the album's theme: "Age is the real omnipresent apparition of Digital Resistance, the mechanism by which cell phones become a threat and sci-fi fantasies morph into Orwellian nightmares". James Christopher Monger of AllMusic also picked up on the technophobic theme, as well as the band's veneration of tradition, which did not detract from the originality of the band's approach: "As Luddite metal albums go, it's a gem, and while it's certainly deserving of the retro tag, it never feels derivative".

== Track listing ==
No.	Title	Length
1.	"Analogue Avengers / Bertrand Russell's Sex Den"	3:49
2.	"Digital Resistance"	2:53
3.	"Habeas Corpsus"	5:08
4.	"Magic Hooligan"	3:50
5.	"Ghastly Appendage"	3:19
6.	"Laser Enforcer"	4:11
7.	"The Price Is Nice"	4:36
8.	"Curriculum Vitae"	5:01
9.	"The Luddite"	3:21
10.	"Warrior's Dusk"	4:34

== Personnel ==
Slough Feg

- Mike Scalzi – guitars, organ, piano, vocals
- Angelo Tringali – guitars
- Adrian Maestas – bass
- Harry Cantwell – drums

Technical personnel

- Mike Scalzi – production
- Justin Weis – production, mixing and mastering
- Martin Hanford – art
