= The Courts of Chaos (album) =

Studio album by Manilla Road
- Released: 1990
- Studio: Miller Studio, North Newton, Kansas
- Genre: Heavy metal; thrash metal; progressive metal
- Length: 52:14
- Label: Black Dragon
- Producer: Manilla Road, Larry Funk, Max Merhoff

Manilla Road chronology
Out of the Abyss (1988)	The Courts of Chaos (1990)	The Circus Maximus (1992)

Professional ratings
Review scores
Source	Rating
AllMusic	2.5/5 stars

The Courts of Chaos is the eighth studio album by American heavy metal band Manilla Road, released in 1990. This is the last album before the band split up and the last to feature both founding bassist Scott Park and longtime drummer Randy Foxe. They reunited in 2001.

== Track listing ==
- All songs written by Mark Shelton, Scott Park and Randy Foxe, except where noted.
1. "Road to Chaos" – 4:44
2. "Dig Me No Grave" – 4:21
3. "D.O.A." – 7:02 (Bloodrock cover)
4. "Into the Courts of Chaos" – 5:23
5. "From Beyond" – 5:05
6. "A Touch of Madness" – 7:03
7. "(Vlad) The Impaler" – 3:27
8. "The Prophecy" – 7:01
9. "The Books of Skelos" – 8:08
  - "The Book of the Ancients"
  - "The Book of Shadows"
  - "The Book of Skulls"

== Notes ==
Reissued in 2002 by Iron Glory Records with a bonus track:

- 10. "Far Side of the Sun" (Live) – originally appeared on the Roadkill live album.

== Credits ==
Manilla Road

- Mark Shelton – vocals, guitar
- Scott Park – bass guitar
- Randy Foxe – drums, keyboards

Production

- Manilla Road – producer
- Larry Funk – co-producer
- Max Merhoff – co-producer
