= The Blessed Curse =

Studio album by Manilla Road
- Released: February 13, 2015
- Genre: Heavy metal
- Length: 98:31
- Label: Golden Core-ZYX

Manilla Road chronology
Mysterium (2013)	The Blessed Curse (2015)	Dreams of Eschaton (2016)

Professional ratings
Review scores
Source	Rating
Metal Crypt	(5/5)
Metal Reviews	(83/100)

The Blessed Curse is the seventeenth studio album by American heavy metal band Manilla Road. It was released on February 13, 2015 in both CD and LP format on Golden Core-ZYX. It is unique in being the band's first and only studio double album.

== Track listing ==
Disc 1 - The Blessed Curse

1. "The Blessed Curse" - 4:47
2. "Truth In The Ash" - 3:17
3. "Tomes Of Clay" - 8:12
4. "The Dead Still Speak" - 3:33
5. "Falling" - 4:43
6. "Kings Of Invention" - 3:18
7. "Reign Of Dreams" - 4:37
8. "Luxifera's Light" - 4:46
9. "Sword Of Hate" - 3:59
10. "The Muses Kiss" - 6:43

Disc 2 - After The Muse

1. "After The Muse" - 5:27
2. "Life Goes On" - 8:27
3. "All Hallows Eve (1981 Live Rehearsal)" - 10:42
4. "In Search Of The Lost Chord" - 3:50
5. "Reach" - 7:05
6. "All Hallows Eve (2014 Studio Recording)" - 15:05

== Personnel ==
- Mark Shelton – guitars, vocals, piano
- Bryan Patrick – vocals
- Andreas Neuderth – drums
- Josh Castillo – bass
