= Mark of the Beast (Manilla Road album) =

Studio album by Manilla Road
- Released: December 2002
- Recorded: 1981
- Genre: Heavy metal; hard rock; psychedelic rock
- Length: 66:05
- Label: Monster

Manilla Road chronology
Spiral Castle (2002)	Mark of the Beast (2002)	Gates of Fire (2005)

Professional ratings
Review scores
Source	Rating
AllMusic	3/5 stars
The Metal Crypt	4.5/5

Mark of the Beast is an album released by American heavy metal band Manilla Road in 2002. Around half of the album was originally recorded in 1981, and was intended to be the band's second album. The results were judged unsatisfactory by the band and so was scrapped in favor of writing the album Metal. With half of the scrapped songs existing for 20 years as a bootleg called Dreams of Eschaton (which would also have been the original title in 1981), Monster Records cleaned up the master tapes and released the project under the name Mark of the Beast with additional unreleased early tracks. The cover is taken from a drawing by Jim Fitzpatrick.

== Track listing ==
All songs written by Mark Shelton.

1. "Mark of the Beast" – 9:35
2. "Court of Avalon" – 7:29
3. "Avatar" – 9:34
4. "Dream Sequence" – 2:45
5. "Time Trap" – 5:59
6. "Black Lotus" – 5:03
7. "Teacher" – 4:51
8. "Aftershock" – 5:10
9. "Venusian Sea" – 6:16
10. "Triumvirate" – 8:22

== Credits ==
- Mark Shelton – guitars, vocals
- Rick Fisher – drums, percussion
- Scott Park – bass
