= Weakling (band) =

American black metal band

- Origin: San Francisco, California, U.S.
- Genre: Black metal
- Years active: 1998–1999
- Label: Tumult
- Spinoffs: Black Goat
- Past members: John Gossard; Josh Smith; Sarah Weiner; Casey Ward; Sam Foster

Weakling was an American black metal band from San Francisco. The band never toured and released only one album, Dead as Dreams, recorded in 1998 and released on Tumult Records in 2000.

== History ==
The name Weakling, according to founding member John Gossard, came from the title of a song by the band Swans from their album Filth.

Weakling was initially started by guitarist John Gossard and guitarist/drum programmer Robert Williams of Ubzub. The two ended up releasing an early version of "No One Can be Called As A Man While He'll Die" on a compilation tape Wintergrief released by Nahitfol Productions in 1996. Briefly, Gossard and Williams continued with Weakling adding Jim Mack on bass, and Antoine Reuben Diavola on drums. Dissatisfied with the dedication of the members, Gossard left the band while the rest of the lineup continued on as Black Goat. The one idea contributed by Mack for the song "This Entire Fucking Battlefield" was later discovered to have been 'borrowed' from the Norwegian band Demonic's song "Nar Morket Faller".

Prior to the release of the album, a few odd tales sprung up about the possible ways it could be distributed, including printing a single copy to be given to a single fan in Europe or burying copies of the album in the ground and giving maps to fans who wanted to find them. Band leader John Gossard has since decried the spread of these stories as a publicity stunt pulled by the band's record label noting that the ideas were never intended to be more than a joke between the band members.

Initially, Weakling was mainly noted for featuring guitarist Josh Smith of The Fucking Champs (fellow Champ Tim Green served as producer), but a recent reissue of their material has brought their work some more attention, and the album has been hailed in some circles, and by musicians including Fenriz of Darkthrone, as a masterpiece. Weakling's sound displays inspiration from the works of Scandinavian bands like Bathory, Burzum and Darkthrone, as one might imagine it filtered through the lens of '70s progressive rock: all five songs on the 76-minute album run at least 10 minutes in length and each is composed of at least 2 distinct sections.

Gossard and bassist Sarah Weiner later played together in the similarly short-lived doom metal band The Gault (although Weiner was the drummer of that outfit); after that band's demise, Gossard went on to join established funeral doom outfit Asunder, and formed a second black metal band, Dispirit, in the wake of Asunder's dissolution. Keyboardist Casey Ward currently plays drums in The Husbands. Drummer Sam Foster currently plays drums for death metal band Saros.

Although Weakling has never officially announced a split, they broke up in 1999.

== Members ==
- John Gossard: guitar and vocals
- Josh Smith: guitar
- Sarah Weiner: bass
- Casey Ward: keyboards
- Sam Foster (a.k.a. Little Sunshine): drums

== Discography ==
Albums

- Dead as Dreams (2000)

Demos

- Live Practice Demo (1998)
- Rehearsal Demo (1998)
