= Metal (Manilla Road album) =

Studio album by Manilla Road
- Released: August 1982
- Studio: Miller Studio (North Newton, Kansas)
- Genre: Heavy metal; hard rock
- Length: 35:43
- Label: Roadster
- Producer: Jon Miller, Larry Funk, Manilla Road

Manilla Road chronology
Invasion (1980)	Metal (1982)	Crystal Logic (1983)

Professional ratings
Review scores
Source	Rating
AllMusic	2.5/5 stars

Metal is the second album by American heavy metal band Manilla Road, released in 1982.

== Track listing ==
1. "Enter the Warrior" – 5:18
2. "Defender" – 2:02
3. "Queen of the Black Coast" – 4:23
4. "Metal" – 6:10
5. "Out of Control with Rock & Roll" – 4:15
6. "Cage of Mirrors" – 8:40
7. "Far Side of the Sun" – 4:55

== Credits ==
Manilla Road

- Mark Shelton – lead vocals, guitars
- Scott Park – bass
- Rick Fisher – drums, percussion, backing vocals

Production

- Music Forward Group – artwork
