= Necropolis (browser game) =

2008 video game

Necropolis is a browser game implemented in Adobe Flash. It was released in October 2008 and is the first game by game designer and programmer Gregory Avery-Weir. It was sponsored by Spanish gaming portal MiniJuegos.com.

== Gameplay ==
Users play as "Ms. Lilian Trevithick, lady adventurer and radical steam technician, who has come to the infamous Necropolis of Ao in search of adventure".

The game presents the action from a top-down perspective. Players explore 25 procedurally-generated levels, looking on each level for treasure, a lever to unlock the stairs to the next level, and then the stairs themselves. At the same time the player tries to avoid harmful spike and steam traps. Players are asked to manage three statistics: Dodge, representing their ability to avoid damage from traps; Detect, representing their ability to discern hidden traps; and Disable, representing their ability to disarm traps to proceed past them. Players also collect health tonics, which can be consumed to restore life energy, and disposable tools, which can be used to disarm traps, as well as a range of equipment which can be used to boost some or all of the three statistics. Gold can also be found, which serves no purpose during the game but acts as a scoring mechanism.

Necropolis bears many similarities to roguelike games, being essentially an exploration of a procedurally-generated dungeon. Its distinctive features are its pensive looping music and its dark, shadow-filled presentation.

== Reception ==
Necropolis received little critical attention. Jay Is Games featured it in a "Link Dump Friday" after the release and popularity of The Majesty of Colors, and felt its most noteworthy qualities were its female protagonist and its creator, Gregory Avery-Weir.
