= Open the Gates =

Studio album by Manilla Road
- Released: 1985
- Recorded: 1984
- Studio: Miller, North Newton, Kansas
- Genre: Heavy metal; power metal
- Length: 52:45
- Label: Black Dragon
- Producer: Manilla Road, Max Merhoff, Rick Fisher

Manilla Road chronology
| Crystal Logic (1983) | Open the Gates (1985) | The Deluge (1986) |

Open the Gates is the fourth album by the American heavy metal band Manilla Road. It was released in 1985 on the Black Dragon record label, rather than the band's own label, Roadster Records, which they had used on their previous releases.

In 2019, Metal Hammer ranked it as the 6th best power metal album of all time.

== Music and lyrics ==
The album's music has been described as "a full house of forceful, lurid metal anthems and mystical doomy epics laden with weird bardic atmospheres" by Metal Hammer. Open the Gates is considered to be the band's heaviest album. Most of the album's material is consistent with the new wave of British heavy metal style, influenced by Iron Maiden and Saxon. However, the album also employs brief bouts of "all-out thrash," according to AllMusic.

The vocals are described as "nasal" by Loudwire. The album's lyrical themes include dragons, witchcraft and kings, drawing influence from the Matter of Britain. The album's themes also draw from science fiction and Norse mythology.

== Critical reception ==
Professional ratings
Review scores
| Source | Rating |
|---|---|
| AllMusic | 4.5/5 stars |
| Kerrang! | 3/5 stars |
| Rock Hard | 7.0/10 |

Eduardio Rivadavia of AllMusic gave the album four and a half stars out of five, and recommended it as a jumping-off point for new fans of the band: "It's easy to understand why Open the Gates has enjoyed such enduring popularity as one of Manilla Road's best loved albums."

== Track listing ==
All songs written by Mark Shelton.

1. "Metalstorm" – 5:17
2. "Open the Gates" – 2:20
3. "Astronomica" – 4:59
4. "Weavers of the Web" – 4:17
5. "The Ninth Wave" – 9:30
6. "Heavy Metal to the World" – 3:19
7. "The Fires of Mars" – 6:13
8. "Road of Kings" – 5:46
9. "Hour of the Dragon" – 4:44
10. "Witches Brew" – 6:20

Note

- The 2001 digipak includes live versions of "Open the Gates" and "Witches Brew".

== Personnel ==
Band

- Mark Shelton – vocals, guitar
- Scott Park – bass
- Randy Foxe – drums

Production

- Manilla Road – producer
- Max Merhoff – assistant producer
- Rick Fisher – assistant producer
- Larry Funk – engineering
- Eric Larnoy – illustration
- Nick Newbill – artwork
