= Manilla Road =

American heavy metal band

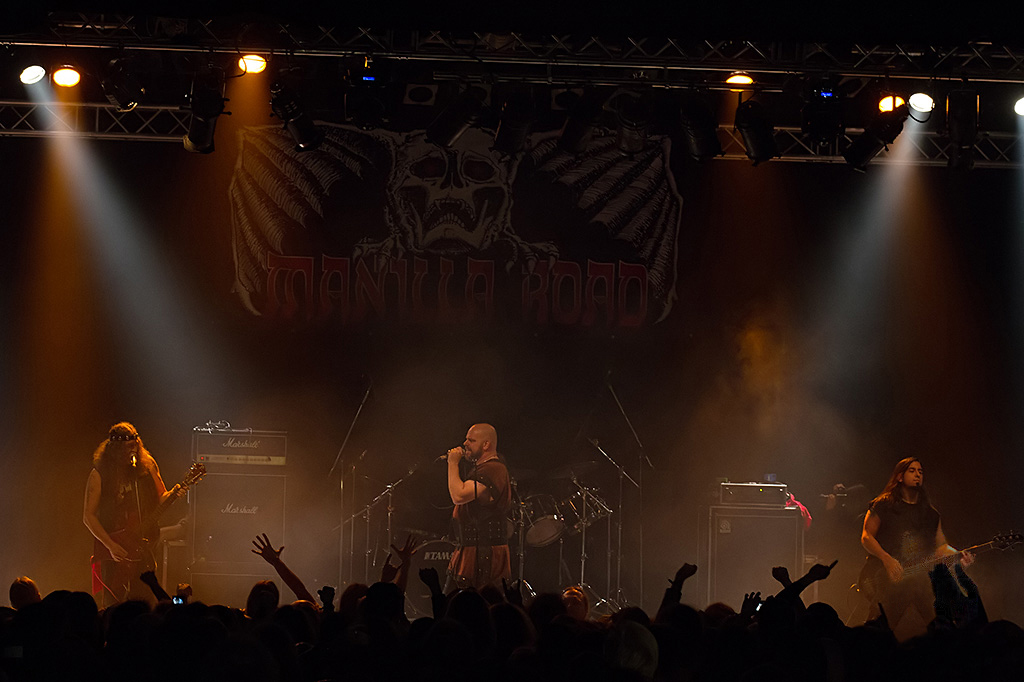
- Manilla Road performing in 2013

Background information
- Origin: Wichita, Kansas, U.S.
- Genres: Heavy metal; power metal; thrash metal; hard rock (early); psychedelic rock (early); progressive rock (early)
- Years active: 1977–1992, 1994–2018
- Labels: Golden Core-ZYX; Shadow Kingdom; My Graveyard; High Roller; Battle Cry; Monster; Iron Glory; Leviathan; Black Dragon; Roadster
- Members: Bryan "Hellroadie" Patrick; Andreas "Neudi" Neuderth; Phil Ross
- Past members: Mark "The Shark" Shelton; Scott "Scooter" Park; Randy "Thrasher" Foxe; Rick "Ziggy" Fisher; Josh Castillo; Cory "Hardcore" Christner; Vince Goleman; Harvey "Crow" Patrick; Scott Peters; Mark Anderson; Myles Sype
- Website: manillaroad.net

Manilla Road was an American heavy metal band from Wichita, Kansas, founded by Mark "The Shark" Shelton (vocals, guitar) and Scott "Scooter" Park (bass). Beginning in 1977, the early years of Manilla Road were spent playing mostly hard rock, psychedelic rock and progressive rock but eventually became noticeably heavier with time, the band's later heavy metal sound becoming more and more apparent with the release of Crystal Logic in 1983.

Achieving moderate success in the mid-80s with several well-received releases such as Crystal Logic (1983), Open the Gates (1985) and The Deluge (1986), the band became known for both the nasal voice of vocalist Mark Shelton and his eclectic style of songwriting, with many of his compositions taking place in fantastical universes combining elements of ancient mythologies and of popular culture mythos such as Robert E. Howard's Conan and H. P. Lovecraft's Cthulhu.

After a major breakup in 1992, the band was reformed by Shelton in the mid-90s, although without co-founder Scott Park and a record label. The following years for Manilla Road were spent mostly by taking gigs in underground mid-western shows without the release of any new material. Seemingly forgotten, Manilla Road was re-discovered by the metal scene after performing at the Bang Your Head festival in 2000, which resulted in the band signing a new record deal and the eventual releases of Atlantis Rising in 2001 and Spiral Castle in 2002. This second era of Manilla Road continued until the death of founder Mark Shelton, who died in 2018 the day after the band played in an outdoor festival in Germany.

== History ==
=== Early years (1977–1982) ===
Manilla Road was created by guitarist and vocalist Mark Shelton in 1977 along with fellow roommates Scott Park at the bass, Benny Munkirs at the drums and Robert Park playing rhythm guitar. The band name "Manilla Road" came to be one night when Shelton and Munkirs were both drinking while watching Monty Python's Flying Circus. After playing in local bars around Wichita, the group first gained attention with their song "Herman Hill", inspired by the Herman Hill riot. Following an accident that took the life of the band's head sound and light engineer, drummer Benny Munkirs decided to leave the band along with Robert and was replaced by Myles Sype on drums. The band then proceeded to record a three-songs demo in 1979 titled Manilla Road Underground, which around a hundred copies on cassette were distributed to local radio stations and simply anyone who would listen.

Unhappy with Sype's drumming, the rest of the band found a replacement in Rick Fisher, a high school friend of Shelton. It was with this early lineup that Manilla Road released their first studio album Invasion in 1980 on the band's own label, Roadster Records. Between this time and their next release the band recorded material in 1981 for an album to be tentatively titled Dreams of Eschaton, however this was not released until 2002 by Monster Records (under the name Mark of the Beast) as Shelton was not happy with the sound. Shelton has since been quoted as saying the music was "not metal enough" and "sounded like shit". Despite this, Mark of the Beast was critically well-received when it was eventually released. Together with Invasion, these early albums have more in common with progressive rock and space rock than the band's later heavy metal sound.

The next studio album was Metal in 1982, which began to define the future musical direction of Manilla Road. Their "classic" sound was truly solidified with the release of Crystal Logic in 1983. The reception of the Crystal Logic album resulted in the band getting exposure in Europe, which in turn landed them an overseas record deal with French label Black Dragon Records.

=== Second lineup (1982–1991) ===
Manilla Road's second lineup; from left to right: Scott Park, Randy Foxe, Mark Shelton

Despite the success of Crystal Logic, drummer Rick Fisher did not feel at ease with the way the band was evolving musically. With Fisher agreeing to step down, Shelton and Park went searching for a drummer who could play double bass drums, in accordance with their newly evolving sound. Drummer Randy Foxe auditioned and was promptly added to the band after demonstrating his ability on the double bass. This second lineup would stay together for the next five Manilla Road studio albums (along with a live release, Roadkill, in 1988). Along with Crystal Logic, the new lineup's first two albums, Open the Gates (1985) and The Deluge (1986) are generally considered to be classics in the field of early epic heavy metal. Lyrics began to feature more and more of Shelton's recurrent allusions to fantastic elements from Norse mythology, Arthurian legend and other literary sources.

The Open the Gates studio album in 1985 was the first one to receive significant promotion from the start due to the efforts of their new label Black Dragon. According to an interview done by Mark Shelton in 2017, tens of thousand of copies were sold in the first months following the release. Their next studio album, The Deluge in 1986, followed up on that success. While commercial success never was a main goal for Shelton, the band's popularity in Europe at the time reached a career peak.

The release of Mystification in 1987 coincided with the beginning of long-term financial troubles for Black Dragon Records in Europe, who soon after lost their distribution partners in both North America and Europe. Marketing malpractices by Black Dragon also resulted in several bands signed under them getting blacklisted by distributors in North America. Problems also began to surface for Manilla Road as Mystification suffered from exceptionally poor production quality, a result from the substandard equipment used at a new studio the band hoped would improve their sound. Modern re-issues of the album have since fixed this problem to a large extent.

After Mystification came Out of the Abyss in 1988. The album was initially released by American label Leviathan Records (David Chastain's) instead of Black Dragon due to their distribution issues. Selling significantly better than Mystification, the album nevertheless was criticized at the time for its overt-thrash metal influences but has since become more appreciated by the band's present-day audience.

The next studio album, The Courts of Chaos, was released in 1990. The release of the album was unusual in that it was done by both Black Dragon Records, for the European market, and Leviathan Records, for the North American market. The North American release of The Courts of Chaos was also done under the name "Mark Shelton" instead of "Manilla Road" due to the blacklisting of bands signed under Black Dragon Records at the time by North American distributors. The album featured a more "classical" Manilla Road sound and was therefore better received by critics at the time. One point of contention was the use of programmed drum samples by drummer Randy Foxe during production. The Courts of Chaos would end up being the last Manilla Road release to feature both Randy Foxe and Scott Park.

=== The Circus Maximus (1992–1994) ===
In 1991, personal tensions in the band while touring were beginning to surface, particularly between Foxe and Park. Combined with the recent distribution issues in North America, the band members decided to take a hiatus and go their separate ways. Mark Shelton formed a band signed under Black Dragon Records called The Circus Maximus along with Andrew Coss and Aaron Brown, who did the front cover artwork for both Out of the Abyss and The Courts of Chaos. Despite never having been intended to be a Manilla Road project due to the lack of musical coherence with the previous releases, the album was nevertheless released in 1992 under the name "Manilla Road" in Europe at Black Dragon's insistence, a move that created great upset to Mark Shelton and the other two members of Manilla Road, Randy Foxe and Scott Park. Together with the bad reception of the album by critics and fans alike, the incident convinced Shelton to go on a recording hiatus that would last for nearly a decade.

=== Reformation (1994–2001) ===
Shelton continued to do live gigs with the other two members of Circus Maximus until the group disbanded in 1994. He soon after decided to reform Manilla Road along with Randy Foxe at the drums and Harvey Patrick at the bass, who was the brother of the band's road manager Bryan Patrick. Unable to attract any attention for a record deal and refusing to do anymore business with Black Dragon Records, the band was reduced to perform at local shows for several years in relative obscurity. This reformation period for Manilla Road also had its first lineup change with Harvey Patrick leaving the band and Mark Anderson taking his place at the bass.

This period of uncertainty continued up until the year 2000 when the band was invited to perform at the Bang Your Head!!! festival in Germany. Sensing an opportunity they could not afford to pass up, Shelton agreed and booked the festival but was forced to replace Randy Foxe at the drums with Troy Olson when the former notified Shelton that he would not be able to attend. The show in Germany was a huge morale booster for the band, with many European fans coming to show their support for Manilla Road despite years of seeming inactivity. It was also while the band was playing in Europe that a new, long-awaited record deal was signed, this time with German label Iron Glory Records. Once back to the United States, the band parted ways with Troy Olson and invited in Scott Peters to be the band's new permanent drummer along with Bryan Patrick, who acted as a second vocalist onstage in order to complement Shelton. It was with this lineup that the Atlantis Rising studio album was released in 2001, ending nine years of recording drought. A concept album blending many elements from Lovecraft's Cthulhu Mythos with Greek and Norse mythology, the sound was much more consistent with the Manilla Road of old and was well received by critics and fans despite some technical hiccups in the album's production.

=== Post-reformation (2002–2018) ===
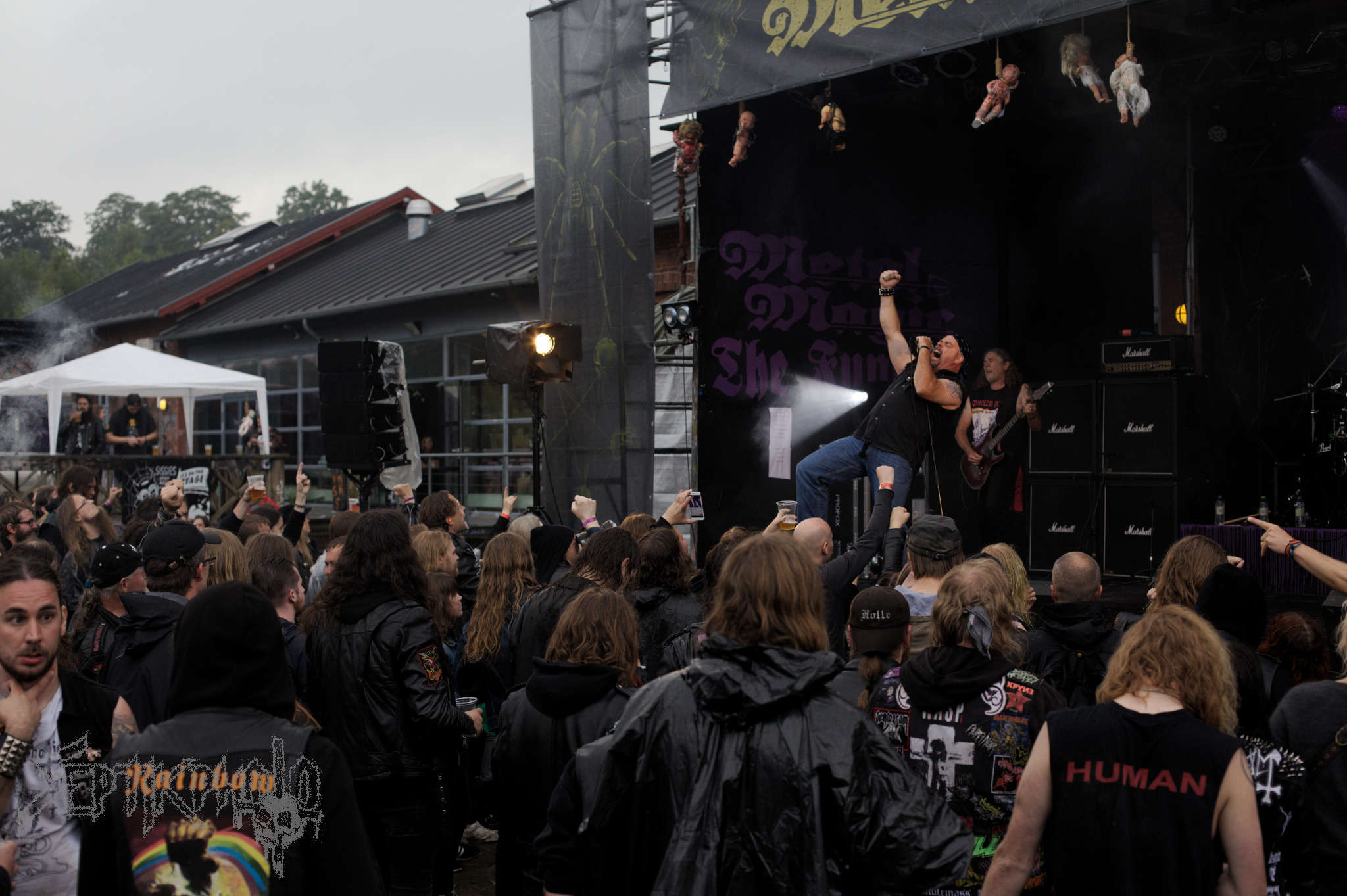
Manilla Road at Metal Magic 2016

The next studio album, Spiral Castle, was released in 2002 and received a similar positive reaction. From this album going forward (with the exception of Voyager), co-singer Bryan Patrick began to be much more implicated in the singing of the songs, eventually more or less splitting the workload with Shelton.

The success the re-emerging band was enjoying however was not enough to prevent yet another round of lineup changes, with drummer Scott Peters and bassist Mark Anderson both leaving and getting replaced by Cory Christner at the drums and Harvey Patrick returning to the fold at the bass. Under this new lineup, the epic-themed Gates of Fire studio album was released in 2005 and the subsequent Viking-themed Voyager studio album in 2008, although co-singer Bryan Patrick had to sit out of Voyager due to personal issues. The Gates of Fire album was also the last one with Iron Glory Records (now Battle Cry Records) and a new record deal was signed with Italian label My Graveyard Productions for the release of Voyager.

With both Gates of Fire and Voyager receiving again praise in the metal community, the band put out their fifteenth studio album in 2011 titled Playground of the Damned. More changes were made to the band's lineup, with Bryan Patrick returning but his brother Harvey leaving. Bassist Vince Goleman was invited in but was forced to leave during the album's recording after he was diagnosed with Ménière's disease. Josh Castillo handled the rest of the recording sessions at the bass. A new record deal was signed for the release of Playground of the Damned, this time with American label Shadow Kingdom Records.

A European tour took place in late 2011, where Manilla Road was invited to perform at the Hammer of Doom VII festival in Germany. After the festival, Andreas "Neudi" Neuderth started his role as the band's new drummer as Christner became unable to tour anymore with the band. A long-time fan of Manilla Road, Neuderth was also the webmaster of Manilla Road's first official website and would later take charge of remastering several of the band's previous releases to better fit modern sound quality standards.

On September 22, 2012, a major record deal was signed with Golden Core, a subsidiary label of ZYX Music. Soon after, Mysterium, the band's sixteenth studio album, was released on February 1, 2013. The 11-minute song serving as the album's title track is a retelling of the last days of Shelton's great-great-great uncle, Ludwig Leichhardt, a 19th-century German explorer who vanished in the Australian interior during an expedition. The next and penultimate studio album for Manilla Road, The Blessed Curse, was released on February 13, 2015, and is a Sumerian-themed double album. With a length surpassing 98 minutes, The Blessed Curse would become Manilla Road's longest studio album.

A double CD reissue of the Mark of the Beast album (bundled with the 1979 demo Manilla Road Underground and After Midnight in-studio live performance) was released in 2016 by High Roller Records, this time under the correct original 1981 title Dreams of Eschaton. A final change was made to the lineup right after The Blessed Curse, with Phil Ross replacing Josh Castillo at the bass.

On May 26, 2017, the band released their first ever single, "In the Wake". This was followed with the release of To Kill a King, Manilla Road's final studio album.

On July 27, 2018, a week before the band was booked to perform at Wacken 2018, band founder Mark Shelton died in a German hospital the day after the band played in the Headbangers Open Air festival the previous night. The cause of death was attributed to a heart attack having been precipitated by severe heat exhaustion. A GoFundMe campaign established to help fund Shelton's body repatriation to the United States and subsequent funeral expenses was met with quick success with over US$40,000 raised in less than 48 hours. A memorial service in his honor was held on September 22, 2018, at the Cotillion Ballroom in Wichita, Kansas.

The band is scheduled to perform at the Hell's Heroes music festival in Houston in March 2026.

== Members ==
Mark "The Shark" Shelton (1957–2018)

=== Final lineup ===
- Mark "The Shark" Shelton – guitar, lead vocals (1977–1992, 1994–2018; died 2018)
- Bryan "Hellroadie" Patrick – lead vocals (1999–2005, 2007–2018)
- Andreas Neuderth – drums (2011–2018)
- Phil Ross – bass (2016–2018)

=== Past members ===
- Scott "Scooter" Park – bass (1977–1990)
- Ben Munkirs – drums (1977–1978; died 2008)
- Robert Park – guitar (1977–1979; died 2000)
- Myles Sipe – drums (1979)
- Rick "Ziggy" Fisher – drums (1979–1984)
- Randy "Thrasher" Foxe – drums (1984–1990, 1994–2000), keyboards (1994–2000), guitar (1990)
- Andrew Coss – bass, keyboards, vocals (1991–1992)
- Aaron Brown – drums (1991–1992)
- Harvey "The Crow" Patrick – bass (1994–1999, 2003–2007)
- Mark Anderson – bass (2000–2002)
- Scott Peters – drums (2000–2003)
- Cory "Hardcore" Christner – drums (2004–2011)
- Vince Golman – bass (2007–2010)
- Josh Castillo – bass (2010–2016)

== Discography ==
=== Studio albums ===
- Invasion – 1980
- Metal – 1982
- Crystal Logic – 1983
- Open the Gates – 1985
- The Deluge – 1986
- Mystification – 1987
- Out of the Abyss – 1988
- The Courts of Chaos – 1990
- The Circus Maximus – 1992 (solo project by Mark Shelton)
- Atlantis Rising – 2001
- Spiral Castle – 2002
- Mark of the Beast – 2002 (recorded in 1981 as "Dreams of Eschaton")
- Gates of Fire – 2005
- Voyager – 2008
- Playground of the Damned – 2011
- Mysterium – 2013
- The Blessed Curse – 2015
- To Kill a King – 2017

=== Singles ===
- "In the Wake" – 2017

=== Live albums ===
- Roadkill – 1988
- Clash of Iron Vol. I – Live at Keep It True – 2007 (split with Brocas Helm)
- After Midnight Live – 2009 (recorded in 1979)

=== Demo ===
- Manilla Road Underground – 1979

=== Compilations ===
- Dreams of Eschaton – 2016
