= Invasion (Manilla Road album) =

Studio album by Manilla Road
- Released: March 20, 1980
- Recorded: 1979
- Studios: Miller Studio, North Newton, Kansas
- Genres: Heavy metal • psychedelic rock; hard rock
- Length: 45:29
- Label: Roadster Records
- Producer: Manilla Road

Manilla Road chronology
Invasion (1980)	Metal (1982)

Professional ratings
Review scores
Source	Rating
AllMusic	3/5 stars

Invasion is the debut studio album by American heavy metal band Manilla Road. It was first released in 1980 and was reissued in 2004 in a two-disc package with Metal on the second disc.

== Track listing ==
1. "The Dream Goes On" – 6:32
2. "Cat and Mouse" – 8:19
3. "Far Side of the Sun" – 8:09
4. "Street Jammer" – 5:18
5. "Centurian War Games" – 3:41
6. "The Empire" – 13:32

== Credits ==
Manilla Road

- Mark Shelton – vocals, guitars
- Scott Park – bass
- Rick Fisher – drums and percussion, backing vocals

Production

- Eric Enns, Jon Miller – mixing
- Manilla Road – mixing, arrangements, front and back cover design
- Sharon Jesik – front cover design
- Mike Arnold – photograph
