= The Locust Years =

Studio album by Hammers of Misfortune
- Released: June 26, 2006
- Genre: Progressive metal
- Length: 44:53
- Label: Cruz del Sur Music

Hammers of Misfortune chronology
The August Engine (2003)	The Locust Years (2006)	Fields/Church of Broken Glass (2008)

The Locust Years is the third studio album by the progressive metal band Hammers of Misfortune. The album was issued in 2006 and reissued in 2010 by Metal Blade Records.

== Track listing ==
No.	Title	Length
1.	"The Locust Years"	7:32
2.	"We Are the Widows"	3:17
3.	"Trot Out the Dead"	4:13
4.	"Famine's Lamp"	5:15
5.	"Chastity Rides"	6:06
6.	"War Anthem"	5:24
7.	"Election Day"	5:38
8.	"Widow's Wall"	7:28

2010 Reissue
No.	Title	Length
9.	"Church of Broken Glass"	4:15

== Personnel ==
=== Musicians ===
- Chewy - drums
- Jamie Myers - vocals, bass guitar
- Mike Scalzi - vocals, guitar
- Sigrid Sheie - acoustic and electric piano, Hammond B3, backing vocals
- John Cobbett - electric, lead and acoustic guitars
