= Atavism (album) =

2005 studio album by Slough Feg

Studio album by Slough Feg
- Released: April 28, 2005
- Genre: Heavy metal, folk metal, power metal
- Length: 38:14
- Label: Cruz del Sur

Slough Feg chronology
| Traveller (2003) | Atavism (2005) | Hardworlder (2007) |

Professional ratings
Review scores
| Source | Rating |
|---|---|
| AllMusic | 4/5 stars |

Atavism is the fifth studio album released by the American heavy metal band Slough Feg (formerly The Lord Weird Slough Feg). A vinyl edition was also produced by Forest Moon Special Products in a limited print of 500. The title of the album: atavism, is the tendency to revert to ancestral type. In biology, an atavism is an evolutionary throwback, such as traits reappearing which had disappeared generations before. Thus the appearance of primordial humans in a cave on the cover.

== Track listing ==
| No. | Title | Length |
|---|---|---|
| 1. | "Robustus" | 0:42 |
| 2. | "I Will Kill You / You Will Die" | 3:50 |
| 3. | "Portcullis" | 1:50 |
| 4. | "Hiberno-Latin Invasion" | 4:04 |
| 5. | "Climax of a Generation" | 2:55 |
| 6. | "Atavism" | 3:30 |
| 7. | "Eumaeus the Swineherd" | 2:38 |
| 8. | "Curse of Athena" | 2:44 |
| 9. | "Agnostic Grunt" | 1:41 |
| 10. | "High Season V" | 1:01 |
| 11. | "Starport Blues" | 2:17 |
| 12. | "Man Out of Time" | 3:05 |
| 13. | "Agony Slalom" | 3:36 |
| 14. | "Atavism II" | 4:12 |
