= Janis Tanaka =

Japanese-American bassist (born 1963)

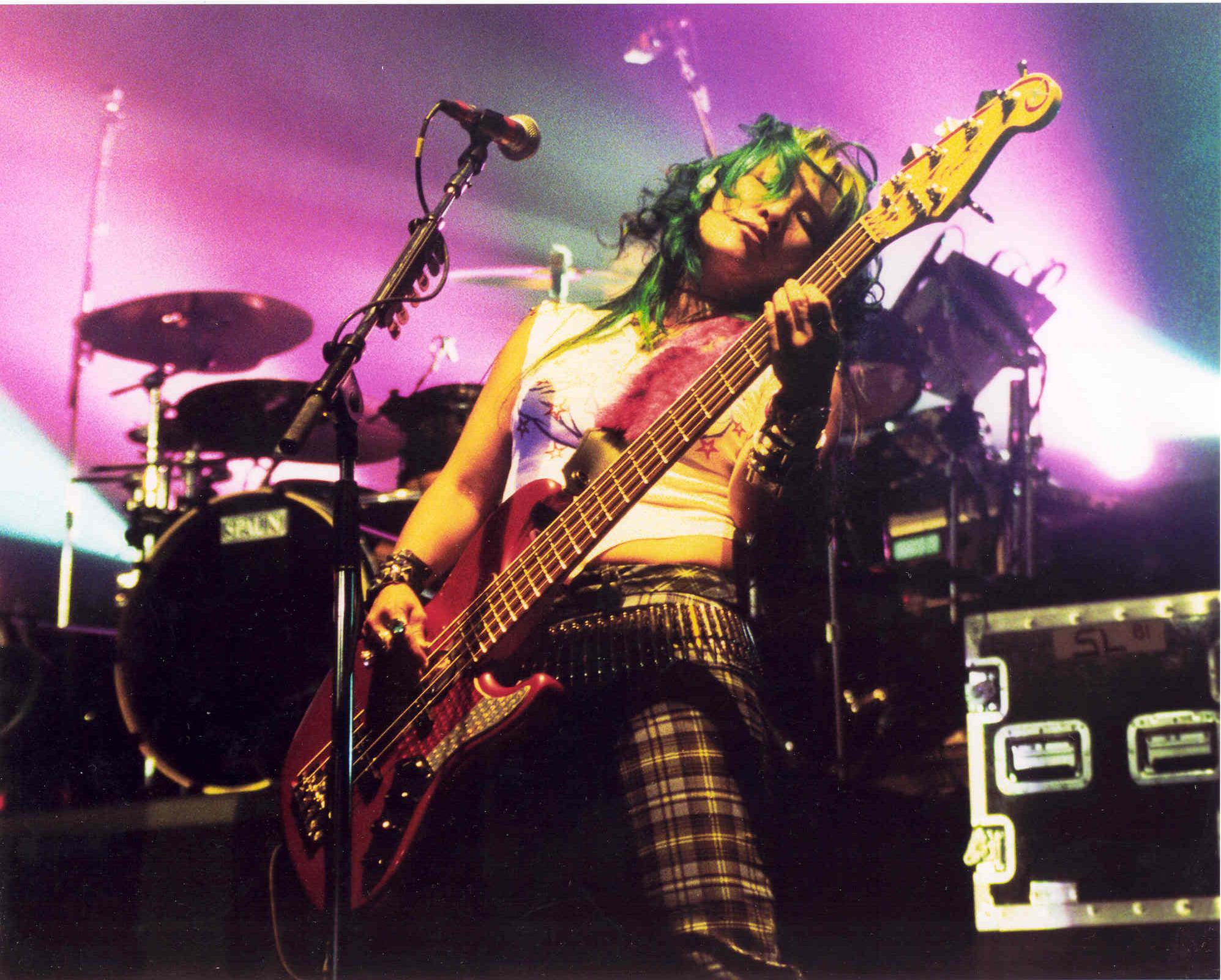
- Tanaka performing in 2002

Background information
- Born: January 9, 1963 (age 63)
- Origin: San Francisco, California, United States
- Genres: Alternative rock; heavy metal; grunge; alternative metal
- Occupation: Musician
- Instruments: Bass, Vocals

Janis Tanaka (born January 9, 1963) is a Japanese-American musician who has worked as a session bassist and on tour with a number of well-known artists including Pink, Fireball Ministry, Hammers of Misfortune, Stone Fox, and L7. She was also a member of Pagan Babies, a band formed by Courtney Love and Kat Bjelland in the 1980s.

== Music career ==
Tanaka grew up in Long Beach, California, in a family with several sisters. She took courses at UCLA for one year followed by Long Beach City College and San Francisco State University. Tanaka began playing guitar, violin, and piano in elementary school.

Early bands Tanaka played with include The Jackson Saints and Pagan Babies.

She left Hammers of Misfortune to play with Pink. In 2001, Tanaka appeared on The Tonight Show with Jay Leno supporting Pink.

She has also played in the band Winterthrall. As of 2017, Tanaka was reportedly playing in The Big Meat Combo and in the all female version of Los Angeles-based Femme Fatale.

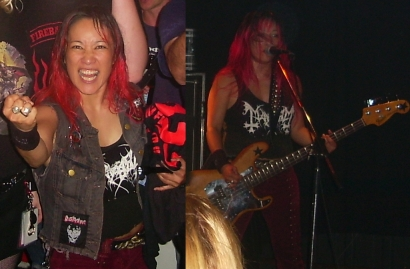
Tanaka in 2004

== Filmography ==
- Tanaka has appeared in several films as herself including L7: Pretend We're Dead, released in 2016 and directed by Sarah Price.
- Fireball Ministry: Master of None, released in 2003.
- She has acted in the films: Live Freaky Die Freaky, Down and Out With Dolls.
- Starred in the film The Year of My Japanese Cousin (1995). She had a starring role in The Year of My Japanese Cousin and received a favorable review of her performance in the San Francisco Chronicle.
