= Brocas Helm (band) =

American heavy metal band

- Origin: San Francisco, California, U.S.
- Genres: Heavy metal, power metal
- Years active: 1982–present
- Members: Jim Schumacher; Jack Hays; Bobbie Wright

Brocas Helm is an American heavy metal band formed in San Francisco, California, in 1982. It is named after the medieval Brocas helm in London's Rotunda, Woolwich.

== History ==
Brocas Helm was founded in 1982 by Bobbie Wright, James Schumacher, Jack Hays, and John Grey. In 1983, the band released their first demo. In 1984, they released their first album, Into Battle, on First Strike Records. The album was licensed to Steamhammer for distribution in Europe.

After disagreeing on the album cover, Brocas Helm left First Strike Records.

The Black Death album with Tom Behney on guitar was recorded over five years. The aim of the recording was to catch the interest of a major record label. After a long, fruitless search, the band founded Gargoyle Records and self-released the record. After a break, Brocas Helm recorded and released the demo Ghost Story. They licensed the "Time of the Dark" (1997) and "Blood Machine"/"Skullfucker" singles.

In 2001, Brocas Helm recorded a show in Athens. In 2003, Eat Metal Records released the official unabridged bootleg live album Black Death in Athens in 2004. That year, the band released their third album, Defender of the Crown.

The songs "Cry of the Banshee" and "Drink the Blood of the Priest" were used in the 2009 video game Brütal Legend.

== Members ==
=== Current members ===
- Bobbie Wright - Guitars, Vocals (1982–present)
- Jim Schumacher - Bass (1982–present)
- Jack Hays - Drums (1982–present)

=== Past members ===
- John Grey - Guitars (1982-1984)
- Tom "T-Bone" Behney - Guitars (1988)

Timeline

== Discography ==
=== Studio albums ===
- Into Battle (1984)
- Black Death (1988)
- Defender of the Crown (2004)

=== Live albums ===
- Black Death in Athens (2004)

=== EPs ===
- Ghost Story (1994)

=== Singles ===
- "Time of the Dark" (1997)
- "Blood Machine"/"Skullfucker" (2000)

=== Splits ===
- (split with Manilla Road) Clash of Iron Vol. I - Live at Keep It True (2007)

=== Demo records ===
- Demo I (1983)
- Black Death (1987)
- Helm's Deep (1989)
