= Tumult Records =

Independent record label

- Founded: 1999
- Founder: Andee Connors
- Country of origin: U.S.
- Location: San Francisco, California
- Official website: tumult.net

Tumult Records (stylized tUMULt) is an independent record label in San Francisco run by Andee Connors (also of Aquarius Records). It has released music by Acid Mothers Temple, Avarus, Brainbombs, Circle, Eikenskaden, Guapo, Harvey Milk, Leviathan, The Margins, The Ohsees, Skullflower, and Souled American.

In 2007, plans were made for a sublabel of tUMULt named Heavy Rescue, aiming to rerelease "lost eighties metal classics." That project seems to still be unrealized.

== See also ==
- List of record labels
