= Punk jazz =

Fusion music genre

- Stylistic origins: Punk rock; jazz; free jazz; jazz fusion
- Cultural origins: Mid-1970s, United States

Subgenres
- Jazzcore

Other topics
- No wave; art punk; post-punk; post-hardcore; math rock; punk funk; avant-funk; bebop; post-bop; swing revival; jazz metal; loft jazz

Punk jazz is a genre of music that combines elements of jazz, especially improvisation, with the instrumentation and performance style of punk rock. The term was first used to describe James Chance and the Contortions' 1979 album Buy. Punk jazz is closely related to free jazz, no wave, and loft jazz, and has since significantly inspired post-hardcore and alternative hip hop.

Notable proponents of the genre include John Zorn, Arto Lindsay, Elliott Sharp, and James Chance, among others.

== History ==
=== 1970s–1980s ===
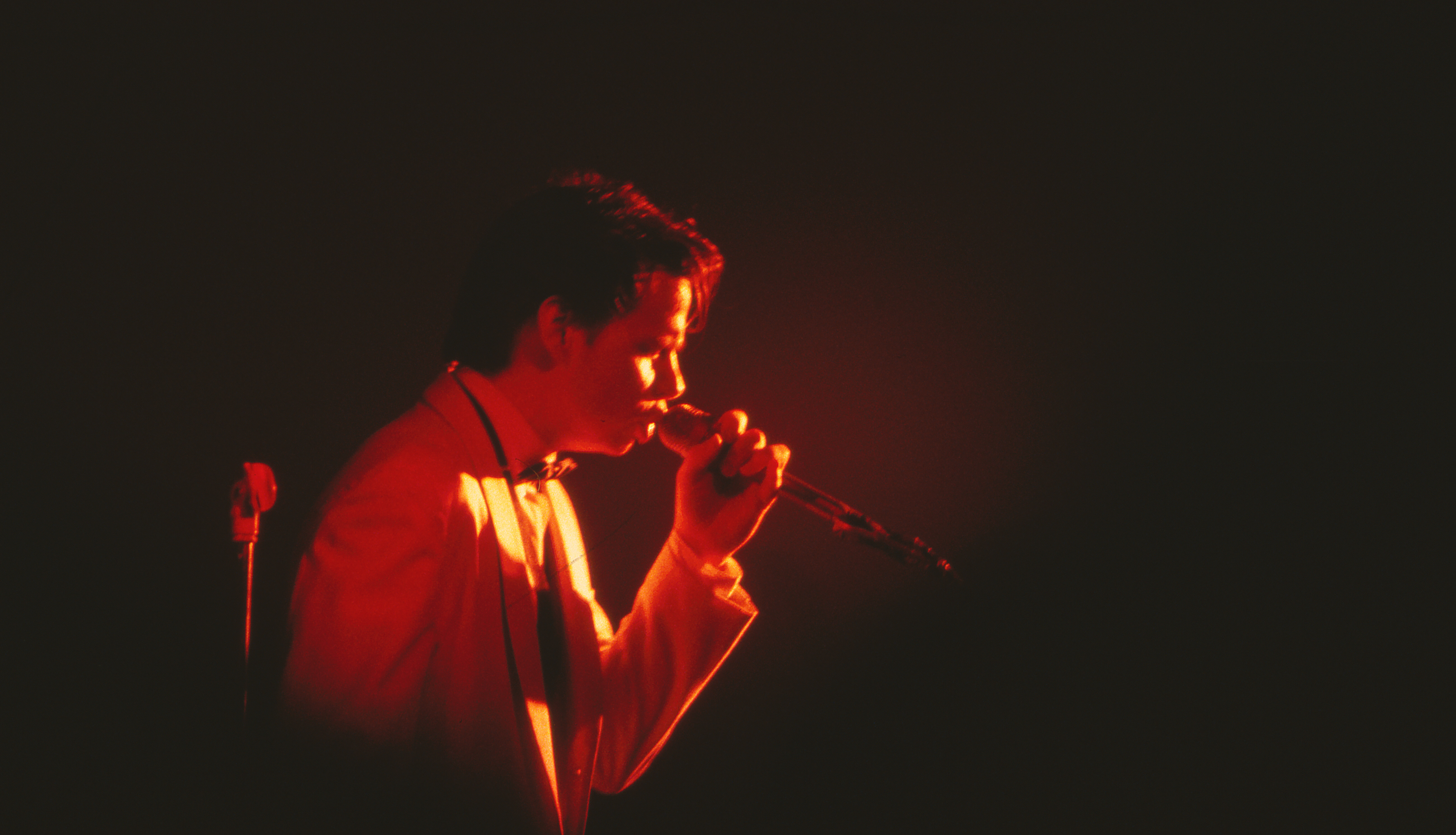
James Chance in 1981

The first band to approach the genre were the Stooges, more specifically on three songs from their second album, Fun House: "1970", "Fun House", and "L.A. Blues". Those songs featured saxophone played by Steve Mackay, and were released in 1970, several years before the genre expanded.

Late 1970s New York no wave bands broke with blues rock-influenced punk in a style that instead combined elements such as free jazz noise, experimental drone rock, and other avant-garde influences. Examples of this style include Lydia Lunch's album Queen of Siam, the work of James Chance and the Contortions, who mixed funk with free jazz and punk rock. These bands, in turn, influenced the styles of the Pop Group and the Birthday Party. In London, the Pop Group began to mix free jazz, along with dub reggae, into their brand of punk rock. The Birthday Party's sound on Junkyard (1982) was described by one journalist as a mix of "no-wave guitar, free-jazz craziness, and punk-processed Captain Beefheart angularity".

The Lounge Lizards was the first group to call themselves punk jazz. Bill Laswell and his band Material mixed funk, jazz, and punk while his band Massacre added improvisation to rock.

James Blood Ulmer applied Coleman's harmolodic style to guitar and sought out links to no wave. Bad Brains, widely acknowledged to have established the rudiments of the hardcore style, began by attempting jazz fusion. Guitarist Joe Baiza executed his blend of punk and free jazz with Saccharine Trust and in Universal Congress Of, a group influenced by the work of Albert Ayler. Henry Rollins has praised free jazz, releasing albums by Matthew Shipp on his record label and collaborating with Charles Gayle. The Minutemen were influenced by jazz, folk and funk. Mike Watt of the band has spoken about being inspired by listening to John Coltrane.

Dutch anarcho-punk group the Ex incorporated elements of free jazz and particularly European free improvisation, collaborating with Han Bennink and other members of the Instant Composers Pool.

=== 1990s ===
Free jazz was an important influence in the American post-hardcore scene of the early 90s. Drive Like Jehu took Black Flag's atonal solos a step further with their dual guitar attack. The Nation of Ulysses had Ian Svenonious alternating between vocals and trumpet, and their complex song structures, odd time signatures, and frenetic live shows were as much hardcore punk as they were free jazz. They even did a brief cover of John Coltrane's A Love Supreme on their Plays Pretty for Baby album, though they titled it "The Sound of Jazz to Come" after Ornette Coleman's classic album The Shape of Jazz to Come. Chicago's Cap'n Jazz also borrowed free jazz's odd time signatures and guitar melodies, marrying them with hardcore screams and amateur tuba playing. The Swedish band Refused was influenced by this scene and recorded an album titled The Shape of Punk to Come, where they alternate between manic hardcore punk numbers and slower, jazzy songs.

=== 2000s–2010s ===
Yakuza from Chicago is comparable to Candiria, combining heavy metal with free jazz and psychedelia. Although Italian band Ephel Duath was credited with the inadvertent recreation of jazzcore on their albums The Painter's Palette (2003) and Pain Necessary to Know (2005), the band moved away from it to pursue a more esoteric form of progressive rock similar to the music of Frank Zappa. Midori made waves around Japan in the mid-2000s for their unrelenting and chaotic blend of hardcore punk and dissonant jazz before disbanding at the end of 2010.

Other punk jazz acts include Gutbucket, Antikult, King Krule and Maruja.

== Jazzcore ==
Jazzcore
- Stylistic origins: Punk jazz; hardcore punk; heavy metal

Other topics
- Mathcore; jazz metal

Jazzcore is a subgenre that incorporates elements of hardcore punk and heavy metal music alongside typical jazz instrumentation and improvisation.
