= Donner Party (disambiguation) =

The Donner Party was an ill-fated group of pioneers in 1846–1847.

Donner Party or The Donner Party may also refer to:

- The Donner Party (1992 film), a documentary by Ric Burns
- The Donner Party (2009 film), a drama by T.J. Martin
- Donner Party (band), a San Francisco-based indie rock band
- The Donner Party, an album by American Murder Song
- "Donner Party (All Night)", a song by Alkaline Trio from Good Mourning
- "The Donner Party", a song by Rasputina from Thanks for the Ether

== See also ==
- Donner (disambiguation)
- "Throwing a Donner Party", a song by Giant Squid from Monster in the Creek
- "Throwing a Donner Party at Sea", a song by Giant Squid from The Ichthyologist
