= Lamb to the Slaughter (disambiguation) =

Lamb to the Slaughter may refer to:

- "Like sheep to the slaughter", a biblical phrase
- Like Sheep Led to Slaughter, a 2004 studio album by Crisis
- "Lamb to the Slaughter", a 1953 short story by Roald Dahl
- "Lambs to the Slaughter", a song by Raven from their 1981 album Rock Until You Drop
- A Lamb to the Slaughter: An Artist Among the Battlefields, a 1984 book by Jan Montyn and Dirk Ayelt Kooiman, ISBN 0-285-62621-3
- "Lamb to the Slaughter", a song by a-ha from their 1993 album Memorial Beach
- Lambs to the Slaughter, a 1979 memoir by Australian cricketer Graham Yallop
