= Ephel Duath =

Ephel Duath may refer to:

- Ephel Dúath, mountain range in Middle-earth
- Ephel Duath (band), Italian band
