= Margot Taulé =

Architect-engineer in the Dominican Republic

- Born: Rose Marguerite Taulé Casso; August 30, 1920; Santo Domingo, Dominican Republic
- Died: July 11, 2008 (aged 87); Santo Domingo, Dominican Republic
- Occupations: architect, engineer

Margot Taulé (August 30, 1920 - 11 July 2008) was an architect-engineer and the first woman to become a registered professional engineer and architect in the Dominican Republic.

== Life and education ==
Rose Marguerite Taulé Casso was born on 30 August 1920 in Santo Domingo, Dominican Republic.

She was one of two daughters of French immigrants.

She studied in the Department of Civil Engineering and Architecture in the former Universidad de Santo Domingo (now the Universidad Autónoma de Santo Domingo) from 1940 to 1944, and was awarded her bachelor's degree in Engineering and Architecture in 1948.

== Works ==
She was responsible for the structural design of the building that houses the Dominican National Congress. This structure was commissioned by the dictator Rafael Leónidas Trujillo in the 1960s and is still in use today. She also worked as a structural engineer alongside other great Dominican architects such as Henry Gazón, Guillermo Gonzales, Leo Pou and José A. Caro.

== Academia ==
Margot Taulé also made very significant and lasting contributions to the academic development of the engineering and architecture profession in Dominican Republic. In 1956 she earned by opposition the title of Full Professor in the University of Santo Domingo. She held the position until 1964 when the university changed its name to Universidad Autónoma de Santo Domingo.

In 1966 a group of professors and distinguished intellectuals frustrated with the situation in the Universidad Autónoma de Santo Domingo founded the Universidad Nacional Pedro Henriquez Urena (UNPHU). Margot Taule was one of the founding professors and a member of the main steering committee. In UNPHU she worked as professor in the civil engineering, architecture and mathematics department. At various times she also held the position Dean of Architecture, Dean of Engineering and in 2003 was elected by the board of trustees as President of the university, a position she held until 2005. In 1985 she received the title of Distinguished Professor by UNPHU citing her contributions to education in engineering and architecture.

Margot Taulé died July 11, 2008, in Santo Domingo, Dominican Republic.
