= Davide Tiso =

Guitarist, composer, and multi-instrumentalist

Davide Tiso (born 21 June 1979) is a guitarist, composer and multi-instrumentalist. He originates from Padua, in Italy, but currently resides in San Francisco, California. He is a member of extreme metal band Ephel Duath, a band he started in 1998.

== Career ==
Outside of Ephel Duath, he has recorded with The Karyn Crisis Band (of whom the two were married) and with guitarist Eraldo Bernocchi on the Parched project, releasing a CD of music of "long, barren, pensive, delicate, touching, harrowing road open to only those who know what they should say, yet decide to mutter no word at all". He more recently recorded as a project called 'Manuscripts Don't Burn', a solo project using material written from the Karyn Crisis Band. as well as collaborating with Karyn on an Aborym album. Davide continued writing and recording with Ephel Duath in 2012 as a complete band, after signing the band with Agonia Records, and released Hemmed By Light, Shaped By Darkness in late 2013. In late 2014, he disbanded Ephel Duath.

In March 2015, he collaborated with Karyn Crysis to release the album Gospel of the Witches. Additionally, he has been a member of Niō and Howling Sycamore, with Watchtower vocalist Jason McMaster, who released their debut album in December 2017. In mid 2018, Davide became a member of the San Francisco metal band Botanist.

== Personal life ==
Davide Tiso has been married to metal vocalist Karyn Crisis, known for her collaboration with Crisis, Ephel Duath, and Gospel of The Witches.

== Discography ==
with Ephel Duath

Demo

- Opera (1998)

Studio albums

- Phormula (2000)
- Rephormula (2002)
- The Painter's Palette (2003)
- Pain Necessary to Know (2005)
- Through My Dog's Eyes (2009)
- Hemmed By Light, Shaped By Darkness (2013)

EP

- On Death and Cosmos (2012)

Remix albums

- Pain Remixes the Known (2007, electro-dub version of "Pain Necessary To Know" produced by Eraldo Bernocchi with Lorenzo Esposito Fornasari)

with Parched

- Arc (2009)

with Manuscripts Don't Burn

- The Breathing House (2010)

with Karyn Crisis' Gospel of the Witches

- Salem's Wounds (2015)
- Covenant (2019)

with Howling Sycamore

- Howling Sycamore (2017)

Other appearances

- Sigillum S – 23/20 (2007)
- Nio
