= Through My Dog's Eyes =

Studio album by Ephel Duath
- Released: January 26, 2009
- Recorded: July 14 – August 2008 at Outer Sound Studios in Rome, Italy
- Genres: Avant-garde metal, jazz fusion
- Length: 32:18
- Label: Earache

Ephel Duath chronology
Pain Remixes the Known (2007)	Through My Dog's Eyes (2009)	On Death and Cosmos (2012)

Professional ratings
Review scores
Source	Rating
Allmusic	3.5/5 stars
Thrash Hits	(4/6)

Through My Dog's Eyes is the fourth studio album by the Italian avant-garde metal band Ephel Duath. The album's concept was conceived by guitarist and founding member Davide Tiso, in which the whole album is from the viewpoint of a dog. The album's artwork is done by Seldon Hunt, who has done artwork for bands such as Sunn O))), Isis, Neurosis, and Earth. The recording and mixing was handled by Novembre's drummer Giuseppe Orlando.

In the same announcement that proclaimed professional poker player Guillermo Gonzales as the vocalist after Luciano George Lorusso quit the band, they also announced that the song "Breed" was listenable on their Myspace.

== Track listing ==
All music and lyrics by Ephel Duath

1. "Gift" - 2:27
2. "Promenade" - 3:33
3. "Breed" - 3:28
4. "Silent Door" - 2:48
5. "Bella Morte" - 2:24
6. "Nina" - 4:27
7. "Guardian" - 3:20
8. "Spider Shaped Leaves" - 4:56
9. "Bark Loud" - 4:55

== Personnel ==
- Luciano George Lorusso - vocals
- Davide Tiso - guitar, bass
- Marco Minnemann - drums

=== Credits ===
- Seldon Hunt - Artwork, layout
- Giuseppe Orlando - Mixing, guitar and vocal recording
- Marco Minnemann - Drum recording
- Finnvox Studios - mastering
- Riccardo Gamondi - Preproduction
- Raffaele Buono (Rough) - Synthesizer on "Nina"
- Francesco Fracassi (Fuzzy) - Synthesizer mixing on "Nina"
- Lou Chano - Programming on "Nina"
- Ben Weinman - Programming on "Bark Loud"

== Recording ==
Preproduction of the album was done at Fiscer-Prais Studio in Alessandria, Italy. The guitars and vocals were recorded and mixed at Outer Sound Studios in Rome beginning in July 2008. The drums were recorded by Marco Minnemann at Homebase Seacoast Studio in California before the rest of the band had even entered the studio.
