= Salem's Wounds =

Studio album by Karyn Crisis' Gospel of the Witches
- Released: March 9, 2015
- Recorded: June 2–24, 2014
- Studios: The Basement (Winston-Salem); Millbrook Sound (Millbrook) (Note: Ross Dolan's vocals); Sterling Audio (Brooklyn) (Note: Mike Hill's vocals and Charlie Schmid's drums)
- Genre: Doom metal
- Length: 61:33
- Labels: Century Media; Golden Viper
- Producer: Jamie King

Karyn Crisis' Gospel of the Witches chronology
Salem's Wounds (2015)	Covenant (2019)

Singles from Salem's Wounds
- 1. "Mother" Released: December 17, 2014; 2. "The Alchemist" Released: February 17, 2015; 3. "The Ascent" Released: October 21, 2015

Professional ratings
Review scores
Source	Rating
Decibel	8/10
Metal Hammer	3/5 stars
Metal Injection	6.5/10
Metal.de	7/10
New Noise Magazine	5/5 stars
Rock Hard	8.5/10
Terrorizer	7/10

Salem's Wounds is the debut studio album by American-Italian heavy metal band Karyn Crisis' Gospel of the Witches, released on March 9, 2015, through Century Media and Golden Viper Recordings.

== Track listing ==
All lyrics are written by Karyn Crisis; all music is composed by Davide Tiso.

No.	Title	Length
1.	"Omphalos"	2:00
2.	"The Alchemist"	6:29
3.	"Ancient Ways"	4:34
4.	"Aradia"	3:42
5.	"Mother"	6:06
6.	"Father"	4:55
7.	"Goddess of Light"	4:00
8.	"Howl at the Moon"	5:45
9.	"Pillars"	3:16
10.	"The Secret"	3:44
11.	"Salem's Wounds"	4:48
12.	"The Sword + The Stone"	4:05
13.	"The Ascent"	8:20
Total length:		61:33

== Personnel ==
Personnel per liner notes.

Musicians

- Karyn Crisis - vocals, invocations
- Davide Tiso - guitars, bass, synths, programming (all tracks), backing vocals (3)
- Ross Dolan - backing vocals (1–6, 8, 9, 11–13)
- Mike Hill - backing vocals (6, 9)
- Charlie Schmid - drums

Technical

- Jamie King - production, mixing, mastering (at The Basement)
- Paul Orofino - recording (at Millbrook Sound)
- Brendan Tobin - recording (at Sterling Audio)

Artwork

- Karyn Crisis - paintings
- Bonnie Rae Mills - photography
- Dehn Sora - layout
