= Giant Squid (band) =

American post-metal/progressive rock band

- Origin: Sacramento, California, United States
- Genres: Doom metal; post-metal; progressive metal
- Years active: 2002–2015 (hiatus)
- Labels: The End (2005–2008), Translation Loss (2009–present)
- Members: Aaron Gregory; Bryan Beeson; Zack Farwell; Jackie Perez Gratz; Andy Southard; touring members: Cory Farwell; Kimberly Freeman; Tim Conroy; Jason Sewell
- Past members: Scotty Sutton; Chris Lyman; Aurielle Zeitler; Mike Conroy; Bill Hughes; Jason Divencenzo; Dave Reynolds
- Website: thissongisaboutsharks.net

Giant Squid is an American post-metal and progressive rock band that originated in Sacramento, California in 2002. They were previously signed to The End Records, and have since been signed to Translation Loss Records. The current lineup contains founding members Aaron John Gregory (guitar, vocals) and Bryan Beeson (bass), as well as Jackie Perez Gratz (electric cello, vocals), Zack Farwell (drums), and Andrew Southard (keyboards, vocals).

== Biography ==
=== Early years (2002–2004) ===
Giant Squid was originally found in 2002 in Sacramento, California, after the members, Aaron John Gregory (guitar, lead vocals), Bryan Beeson (bass guitar), Bill Hughes (guitar), and Aurielle Zeitler (keyboards, vocals), had been playing in Northern California under the monikers Koi and Namor. The band self-released its debut album Metridium Field in 2004 through its own record label, Tyrannosaurus Records. Metridium Field contained re-recorded versions of the songs "Revolution in the Water" and "Ampullae of Lorenzini", two tracks originally released locally in 2002 as a two-song CD under the band's previous name, Namor.

Recording of Metridium Field started in February 2003, and now included Jason Divincenzo on drums. Giant Squid hired heavy music producer Billy Anderson (Neurosis, High on Fire, Mr. Bungle, Melvins) to record and produce Metridium Field in Sacramento at the recording studio The Hangar. AJ Welham was the assistant engineer for the week-long session, and Brandon Oreno later recorded much of the vocals on the record. The album was mastered by Eric Broyhill at Monster Lab Audio in Sacramento. During the middle of the recording process, Aaron Gregory's father was killed in a motorcycle accident, which delayed the eventual release until April 2004.

=== Monster in the Creek (2005) ===
In 2005, Giant Squid self-released four-hundred hand made/assembled copies of an EP entitled Monster in the Creek, also under their own label, Tyrannosaurus Records. The EP was recorded mostly live and strictly analog to two-inch/sixteen track tape at the Hangar recording studio with engineer Eric Broyhill. It contained select songs about the Jersey Shore shark attacks of 1916 with titles such as "Monster in the Creek" and the instrumental "Lester Stillwell", named after the 11-year-old boy killed during the attacks. Monster in the Creek featured Mike Conroy on drums and Andy Southard on keyboards and additional vocals, giving the band three lead vocalists for a short while. Relieved of her keyboard duties, Aurielle became a full-time guitar player in the band.

=== Metridium Fields (2006–2008) ===
A copy of Metridium Field came to the attention of employees at experimental music label The End Records resulting in a record deal in 2005. Because of the line-up changes since the recording of Metridium Field, and the fact that the hard drive containing the original session files for the album had locked up and thus made remixing the record impossible (which the band felt it needed before a worldwide release), Giant Squid decided to rerecord the entire album to reflect their progression in sound and songwriting. This new version features Mike Conroy on drums and Aurielle on both guitar and keyboards as well as a second vocalist. Mike Conroy's brother Tim plays trumpet on the tracks "Versus the Siren" and the twenty-one-minute final track "Metridium Field". Andy Southard, who had recently departed the band, made a guest appearance playing keyboards on the title track "Metridium Field". The band hired Billy Anderson again to engineer all the instrumental tracks in Sacramento at The Hangar recording studio. Robert Cheek was an assistant engineer and later recorded the majority of vocals on "Neonate" and "Revolution in the Water" at his private home studio. During the recording process, the band relocated to Austin, Texas. There they finished recording vocals and minor instrumentation with Jason Rufuss Sewell at his private studio, Nebulost Productions, in Bastrop, Texas. Sewell also contributed some minor instrumentation performances on the record before mixing and producing it. Eric Broyhill mastered the record again at Monster Lab Audio. The album was released as Metridium Fields (plural, although the digipak packaging still says "Metridium Field" on the spine) on The End Records, August 22, 2006, and found worldwide, critical acclaim.

The band toured the east coast and into Canada in March 2006 with label mates The Gathering, with Jason Rufuss Sewell playing keyboards and Tim Conroy performing his trumpet parts live. The band then toured the Midwest and West coast in July 2006 with label mates Stolen Babies, a few select dates with friends Prize Country, as well as performing at the CD release of The End Records veterans Agalloch in Portland, Oregon. This time around, Tim Conroy took over keyboard duties as well as playing his trumpet parts live. Immediately following this tour, the Conroy brothers left the band and Austin.

Giant Squid played a handful of Austin shows with Kimberly Freeman and Scott Sutton (both from Austin band, One-Eyed Doll) on keyboards and drums respectively. One of these first gigs included opening for Isis, at the Austin venue Emo's. Giant Squid played its last show as a local Austin band with this lineup at Room 710, October 20. Aurielle parted ways with the band in November 2006. Kimberly Freeman left shortly after to pursue One-Eyed Doll. Aaron and Bryan, returned to California in December 2006, bringing Scott Sutton along with them.

Before leaving Austin, Giant Squid recorded Sutter's Fort, engineered and produced by Jason Rufuss Sewell at Nebulost Productions. It was the first recording featuring Scott Sutton on drums and the last collaboration between Aurielle and founding members, Aaron and Bryan. The song was released by The End Records in a limited edition (only 500 copies, 250 in beige, 250 in brick red) vinyl 7" split with San Francisco band, Grayceon, who contributed "The West". Grayceon featured future Giant Squid member, Jackie Perez Gratz.

Jackie Perez Gratz, cello player of Amber Asylum fame, joined Giant Squid in January 2007 as both vocalist and cellist. As a four piece, Giant Squid embarked on a thirty one day tour (with only three days off) across the nation and into Canada. The first week of tour included San Francisco's Ludicra and Portland Oregon's Black Elk. At the Austin music festival SXSW, Giant Squid's sister band Grayceon joined the tour for the remaining three weeks. Later that year, Giant Squid toured the West Coast for eight dates with Australian doom-band, [Whitehorse].

In February 2008, Giant Squid entered Shark Bite Studios in Oakland, CA and recorded their first cover song, "Octopus" by Syd Barrett, for the Dwell Records tribute compilation, Like Black Holes In The Sky: A Tribute to Syd Barrett. Since Sutton was unable to relocate at the time from Eugene, OR in order to stay in the band, Zack Farwell of Grayceon stepped in for the studio session. The track was produced by Billy Anderson with assistant engineer, Adam Myatt.

=== The Ichthyologist (2008–2010) ===
Giant Squid left The End Records after the label felt the band should continue to tour behind Metridium Fields, instead of writing and recording another record, something the band felt very strongly about. The band acquired San Francisco drummer, Christopher Melville Lyman, of local rock band, Turn Me On Dead Man (Alternative Tentacles). Giant Squid then entered Litho Room Studios in Seattle, WA, in August 2008 and Red Room Studios, also in Seattle, WA, in September 2008 to record their second album, The Ichthyologist, produced by Matt Bayles (ISIS, Mastodon, Botch, Pearl Jam). Giant Squid funded the entire recording, pressing, and promotion of the album. The Ichthyologist was self-released on February 3, 2009, via the band's Myspace and official website as a limited edition of only 1,000 copies, featuring exclusive packaging with imagery drawn by early twentieth century biologist, Ernst Haeckel. The Ichthyologist contains guest vocal appearances by Anneke van Giersbergen (The Gathering, Agua De Annique) and Karyn Crisis (Crisis), violin by Kris Force (Amber Asylum, Neurosis), and flute by Lorraine Rath (Amber Asylum, The Gault, Worm Ouroboros), trumpet by Nate Perkins (The Lesdystics) and oboe by Cat Gratz (Jackie's sister). Despite the band's unsigned status at this point, national print music magazines such as Revolver, Decibel, and Terrorizer ran features and reviews of The Ichthyologist, boosting sales greatly for the band. The initial 1000 copies sold out by July 2009.

In February 2009, the band went on an eleven-day West Coast tour with Los Angeles band, 16 (Relapse Records), in support of The Ichthyologist. A full national tour, with sister band Grayceon started July 30 in San Francisco and ended August 22 in Austin, TX.

The band signed to Translation Loss Records out of Philadelphia, PA who re-released The Ichthyologist on August 18, 2009, as a digipak CD. Vega Vinyl released the album on limited edition, colored/180 gram vinyl around the same time. The album features new mixes of "Panthalassa", "Throwing a Donner Party at Sea", "Blue Linckia", and "Emerald Bay". It also features all new artwork by legendary comic book artist, Sam Kieth (The Maxx, Batman, Sandman, Wolverine, Aliens).

=== Cenotes (2011–2012) ===
In October, 2011, Giant Squid released the Cenotes EP via Translation Loss. This 35 minute album contained five songs, and was again engineered, mixed, and produced by Matt Bayles. This release also featured the return of Scott Sutton on drums. All the album art was illustrated/produced by Aaron Gregory. A 12" vinyl release with completely redone artwork and accompanied with an 18-page comic book, written and illustrated entirely by Gregory, has been delayed since Fall of 2013. Reasons for such are Aaron's intense time commitments to school (he has been attending the Academy of Art University in San Francisco full-time as an illustration student since 2010) and parenting duties since the birth of Pearl (September, 2011), his daughter with Jackie, have not allowed enough time to produce the comic-book to his standards. The vinyl/comic release is tentatively slated for a 2016 release.

=== Latest line-up and Monster in the Creek reissue (2013) ===
Monster in the Creek era keyboardist and vocalist, Andrew Southard, (who also performs as the solo artist, Young Aundee,) returned to the band in Spring 2013, as a full-time member. At the end of 2013, drummer Scotty Sutton left the band to move back to Eugene, OR and run his family's printing company. He was replaced with Zack Farwell (Grayceon drummer and husband of previous Giant Squid guitarist, Cory Tozer). Currently, the members of the band are divided, with Aaron, Jackie, and Zack residing in Pacifica, and Bryan and Andy living in Shingle Springs, CA east of Sacramento.

In the Summer of 2013, Giant Squid officially re-issued their 2005 EP, "Monster in the Creek" via Translation Loss. The album came packaged with a DVD produced entirely by Aaron Gregory, featuring studio footage, live footage, and still photos. The CD contained a remastered version of the full original EP, plus previously unreleased preproduction versions of songs, as well as three live tracks.

Following this release, the band hinted at more official reissues of self-released content, including vinyl formats of such, to follow via Translation Loss Records.

The only gigs the band played this entire year with Sutton on drums happened in one weekend. They were a secret warm up show at Winters, a local Pacifica neighborhood bar; the wedding of Christopher Gallagher, a long time fan of the band; a free, all-ages benefit for shark research organizations, Ocean Research Foundation and Shark Stewards, which was held at the Speakeasy Brewery in San Francisco. On December 1, the band played its first official show with Farwell on drums supporting for [Church of Misery] (Japan) at Harlows in Sacramento, CA.

=== Minoans (2014) ===
In June 2014, Giant Squid went into Louder Studios in Grass Valley, CA with producer/engineer, [Tim Green] (Melvins, Karp, Fucking Champs) and tracked their fifth official studio album, entitled, Minoans. This eight song LP is conceptually about the demise of the proto-European civilization of people known as Minoans who originated on the Greek island of Crete. Gregory has hinted that, while the album is predominantly historically accurate in its lyrical content, it too may be tied into his ongoing mythological story line of The Ichthyologist. Minoans is being mastered by Brad Boatright, and features album art produced/illustrated again by Aaron Gregory. It was released on CD/vinyl LP/digital in October, 2014 via Translation Loss.

== Members ==
=== Current members ===
- Aaron Gregory – vocals, guitar
- Bryan Beeson – bass guitar
- Jackie Perez Gratz – cello, vocals
- Andy Southard - keyboards, vocals
- Zack Farwell - drums

=== Previous members ===
- Scott Sutton – drums
- Chris Lyman – drums
- Bill Hughes – guitar
- Aurielle Zeitler – vocals, guitar, keyboards
- Mike Conroy – drums
- Jason Divencenzo – drums
- Dave Reynolds – drums

=== Touring members ===
- Cory Tozer – guitar
- Kimberly Freeman - Keyboards
- Tim Conroy – keyboards, trumpet
- Jason Sewell – keyboard

== Discography ==
- "Revolution in the Water"/"Ampullae of Lorenzini" single (2001, self-released under the name, NAMOR)
- Metridium Field (2004, Tyrannosaurus Records)
- Monster in the Creek EP (2005, Tyrannosaurus Records)
- Metridium Fields (2006, The End Records)
- "Sutter's Fort" (Split 7" with Grayceon) (2007, The End Records)
- The Ichthyologist (February 3, 2009, self-released, Aug, 2009 release on Translation Loss)
- Cenotes (2011, -- )
- Minoans (2014, Translation Loss Records)
