= Karyn Crisis' Gospel of the Witches =

American-Italian doom metal band

- Also known as: Karyn Crisis Band (2009–2014)
- Origin: Tuscany, Italy; San Francisco Bay Area, California, U.S.
- Genres: Doom metal; gothic metal; progressive metal
- Years active: 2009–present
- Labels: Century Media; Aural Music; Golden Viper
- Spinoff of: Crisis; Ephel Duath
- Members: Karyn Crisis; Davide Tiso

Karyn Crisis' Gospel of the Witches is an American-Italian heavy metal band, consisting of Crisis vocalist Karyn Crisis and Ephel Duath instrumentalist Davide Tiso. The band was initially formed in Tuscany in 2009, when Karyn began working with Tiso on a planned solo album. After the project fell apart, they relocated to the San Francisco Bay Area and launched the Karyn Crisis Band; the band adopted its current name in early 2014.

Gospel of The Witches' first album, Salem's Wounds (2015), was funded through Kickstarter and Indiegogo and released by Century Media Records. The band supported its release with a few live performances with Ross Dolan, Robert Vigna, and Charlie Schmid. In 2019, they released its second album, Covenant, through Aural Music.

== History ==
=== Formation and Salem's Wounds (2009–2015) ===
Karyn Crisis initially rose to prominence as the vocalist of the American metal band Crisis. After the band entered an indefinite hiatus in 2006, she took a break from the music industry to focus on other creative endeavours. In November 2008, she announced plans to begin working on a solo album in Italy with producer Eraldo Bernocchi and Ephel Duath instrumentalist Davide Tiso. In February 2009, she travelled to Italy to begin writing the album; by the end of March, they had recorded thirteen songs and planned to record another five. Whilst working on the album, Karyn stayed in a house with Tiso in Tuscany, where she claimed to have established contact with a spirit guide called Aradia who taught her about witches and their histories and practices. Sixteen songs in recording and before vocals were tracked, work on the solo album collapsed due to creative differences between Karyn and Bernocchi. After travelling Italy together, Karyn and Tiso relocated to the San Francisco Bay Area and began seeking members for the Karyn Crisis Band in May 2009. In a January 2011 interview, Tiso said he planned to finish the Karyn Crisis Band album by the summer. In November 2011, pre-production commenced with Powerhouse drummer Danny Walker.

The songs on Karyn Crisis' Gospel of the Witches debut album, Salem's Wounds, were written between January 2009 and June 2014. Karyn attributed the album's protracted writing process to her initially struggling to connect with Tiso's music. During this time, Karyn trained as a spirit medium and held workshops related to the subject; she said work on the album improved after she started channeling Aradia from her art into her music and found it easier to connect to it. In February 2014, Karyn officially launched Gospel of the Witches. In April, a demo clip of "The Ascent" was posted. The band began recording Salem's Wounds in June 2014 with producer Jamie King at The Basement Recording in Winston-Salem, North Carolina. Mike Hill of Tombs and Ross Dolan of Immolation provided backing vocals; although Walker was initially announced to perform on it, Charlie Schmid performed drums on the album. The band set up campaigns on Kickstarter and Indiegogo to fund the album's recording, with a goal of $15,000; they fell short of the money needed to release it, and began searching for a record label. After Karyn reconnected with label president Marco Barberi—whom decades earlier was responsible for signing Crisis to Metal Blade Records—Gospel of the Witches signed to Century Media Records in November 2014.

Salem's Wounds was released on March 9, 2015, through Century Media and Golden Viper Recordings, Karyn Crisis' Gospel of the Witches' own imprint label. "Mother", "The Alchemist", and "The Ascent" were released as singles from the album with music videos. Karyn Crisis' Gospel of the Witches played some shows following its release, with its live lineup featuring Robert Vigna on guitar, Dolan on bass and Schmid on drums. The band made its live debut performing at Trickshots in Clifton Park, New York on March 28, 2015; the following day, the band performed at the Slutist festival at the Saint Vitius Bar in Brooklyn. In July, they played another show in Philadelphia with Crypt Sermon. The following month, Century Media was acquired by Sony Music Entertainment; Karyn Crisis' Gospel of the Witches soon came into creative conflicts with the label and they were dropped shortly thereafter.

=== Covenant and planned third album (2019–present) ===
In 2019, Gospel of the Witches recorded its second album, Covenant. Karyn said it was conceptually based around "female divinities". Tiso played all instruments apart from drums, which were played by Skinlab drummer Fabian Vestod. The band released the album on October 25, 2019, through Golden Viper and Aural Music. Karyn hoped to promote the album with live performances.

Since early 2022, Karyn has struggled with health issues from topical steroid withdrawal. In a September 2022 interview with Heavy Metal HQ, Tiso said that a third Gospel of the Witches album was in the works but would be released "[w]hen is the right time for [him and Karyn]". In a 2024 interview with Transcending the Mundane, he said that Karyn's health struggles had forced them to put Gospel of the Witches on hold until she got better, but also confirmed that the third album's songs were ready for her to sing on.

== Musical style ==
Gospel of the Witches have been widely described as doom metal, as well as experimental metal, gothic metal, and progressive metal.

== Band members ==
Band members

- Karyn Crisis – vocals (2009–present)
- Davide Tiso – bass, guitar, instruments (2009–present)

Session/touring members

- Ross Dolan - backing vocals (studio and touring; 2014–2015), bass (touring; 2015)
- Robert Vigna - guitar (touring; 2015)
- Mike Hill - backing vocals (studio; 2014)
- Charlie Schmid - drums (studio and touring; 2014–2015)
- Fabian Vestod - drums (2019)

== Discography ==
=== Studio albums ===
List of studio albums, with selected details
Title	Album details
Salem's Wounds	Released: March 9, 2015; Label: Century Media, Golden Viper; Format: CD, LP, DD
Covenant	Released: October 25, 2019; Label: Aural Music, Golden Viper; Format: CD, LP, DD

=== Singles ===
List of singles, showing year released along with albums
Title	Year	Album
"Mother"	2014	Salem's Wounds
"The Alchemist"	2015	Salem's Wounds
"The Ascent"	2015	Salem's Wounds
