= Cenotes (EP) =

EP by Giant Squid
- Released: 25 October 2011
- Recorded: June 2011
- Genres: Doom metal; post-metal; progressive metal
- Length: 35:05
- Labels: Independent; Translation Loss
- Producer: Matt Bayles

Giant Squid chronology
| The Ichthyologist (2009) | Cenotes (2011) | Minoans (2014) |

Cenotes is the second EP by post-metal band Giant Squid. It was released on 25 October 2011 through Translation Loss Records. Released two and a half years after the band's previous release, The Ichthyologist, it continues the story of that album's protagonist.

According to Giant Squid's official website, "The middle eastern aesthetic that the band has embraced throughout its entire cannon[sic] consumes this new material to its core. Riff worship meets gypsy jangle and Arabesque male/female vocal harmonies, further enhancing the band's trademark, otherworldly, musical storytelling. Unarguably, Cenotes is the deepest, fastest, sludgiest, and most adventurous release from Giant Squid yet."

On 16 September, Revolver's website posted the track "Figura Serpentinata". On 6 October, Pitchfork streamed the song "Mating Scars" on its website. National Public Radio's First Listen program debuted the full album on 9 October, sixteen days before the official release date.

== Reception ==
Professional ratings
Review scores
| Source | Rating |
|---|---|
| Metal Review | 9/10 stars |
| Revolver | 3.5/5 stars |

Upon its release, Cenotes had received positive reviews. Zach Duvall of Metal Review described the band as "...one of the most adventurous and unique bands in music today — music, not just metal." In his review for Revolver, Jason Le Miere concluded that "...each element is impressive, but it is the way that they flow together, perfectly complementing one another into a vital, organic whole, that makes Cenotes truly remarkable," and considers the album "more accessible, more direct, and more metal than Giant Squid's powerful past works".

== Track listing ==
1. "Tongue Stones (Megaptera megachasmacarcharias)" - 9:15
2. "Mating Scars (Isurus metridium)" - 8:03
3. "Snakehead (Channidae erectus)" - 7:47
4. "Figura Serpentinata (Pycnopodia sapien)" - 3:51
5. "Cenotes (Troglocambarus maclanei)" - 6:06
