= Crisis (metal band) =

American avant-garde metal band (1993–2006)

- Crisis in 1996. From left to right: Afzaal Nasiruddeen, Karyn Crisis, Fred Waring III and Gia Chuan Wang

Background information
- Also known as: Skullsick Nation (2001–2002)
- Origin: New York City, U.S.
- Genres: Avant-garde metal; death metal; progressive metal
- Years active: 1993–2006
- Labels: Surge; Too Damn Hype; Metal Blade; The End; Children of Rage
- Spinoffs: Karyn Crisis' Gospel of the Witches
- Past members: Karyn Crisis; Afzaal Nasiruddeen; Jwyanza Hobson; Gia Chuan Wang; Fred Waring III; Scott Bates; Jason Bittner; Tony Costanza; Christopher Olivas; Marshall Kilpatric; Joshua Florian; Justin Arman

Crisis was an American heavy metal band, formed in New York City in 1993 by vocalist Karyn Crisis, guitarist Afzaal Nasiruddeen, bassist Gia Chuan Wang and drummer Fred Waring III. Karyn, Nasiruddeen and Wang were the only members to appear on all of its albums, with the band cycling through various drummers following Waring's departure in 1996; its final lineup featured second guitarist Jwyanza Hobson, who joined in 1998, and drummer Justin Arman, who joined in 2005. Largely defying categorization, the band were known for their complex songwriting that drew upon various influences and styles.

In 1993, Crisis released its debut album 8 Convulsions, which sold more than 1,000 copies on cassette prior to being reissued by Too Damn Hype Records in 1994. The band signed to Metal Blade Records in 1995, releasing Deathshead Extermination (1996) and The Hollowing (1997) through the label before parting ways due to a lack of support. After relocating to Los Angeles, Crisis underwent a transitional period from 2001 to 2002, experimenting with a more accessible version of its sound under the alias Skullsick Nation. After reverting to their original name, Crisis signed with The End Records to release their fourth and final album Like Sheep Led to Slaughter (2004). The band went on an indefinite hiatus in May 2006.

== History ==
=== Formation and 8 Convulsions (1993–1994) ===
Crisis was formed in March 1993 in New York City, by vocalist Karyn Crisis, guitarist Afzaal Nasiruddeen (a.k.a. Afzaal Deen), bassist Gia Chuan Wang and drummer Fred Waring III. Nasiruddeen and Waring both played in a band called Stalwart, and wanted to form a heavy band with a female singer, who could perform and write in a heavy and emotional context, which they felt had not been done before. Karyn, an experimental musician who had recently moved from Chicago to New York City, was connected to Nasiruddeen through her roommate, band photographer Richard Hobbs. After playing tapes of their music to each other, Karyn was invited to audition for Crisis; Nasiruddeen gave her a rehearsal tape featuring the song "Drilling Me", which she wrote lyrics for and used to develop her vocal style. When Karyn agreed to join, Greg Mohr, the bassist who Nasiruddeen and Waring were playing with at the time, quit because he refused to play with a woman and was replaced by Gia Chuan Wang, whom was recruited through a newspaper advertisement. Nasiruddeen said that Crisis' first rehearsal was "something [he would] never forget". In a 1999 interview, Karyn recalled: "I asked them to play ["Drilling Me"] real fast. I just jumped around the rehearsal space that first time and we realized that we all connected". Karyn created Crisis' logo, intended to represent the "sharp and jagged" nature of the band's music, and would go on to design the covers for all of their albums.

Although Nasiruddeen had made many connections in the New York scene from his work at CBGB and with Stalwart, Crisis initially struggled to book shows due to the band's then-anomalous status as a metal band featuring a woman. The band played their first show at CBGB with some avant-jazz bands, following a last-minute request from Swans drummer Virgil Moorefield. Two or three months after its formation, Crisis recorded a three-song demo, Home. Another two months later, they recorded five more songs and released its debut album, 8 Convulsions. Crisis sold cassette copies of the album at their shows along the east coast of the United States, where they would spend two years touring. Karyn said that although the band intended 8 Convulsions as a demo, "people bought them so quickly that we had to make more of them"; more than 1,000 copies were sold. In October 1994, 8 Convulsions was reissued on CD by Too Damn Hype Records. Following this, Crisis were offered a record deal by Metal Blade Records; in June 1995, the band signed a three-album deal with the label.

=== Deathshead Extermination and The Hollowing (1995–1997) ===
After touring in support of 8 Convulsions for a year and a half, Crisis began working on material for its second album, Deathshead Extermination. The band produced material collaboratively through jamming and rehearsals, contrasting with the band's early days, when Nasiruddeen was its primary songwriter; he credited Karyn with making Crisis's songwriting more democratic and dynamic with her vocal range. The band recorded the album in October 1995 and released it in March 1996. Around the time of the album's release, the band embarked on a three week "warm-up" tour with Pro-Pain. Prior to embarking on a nine-week tour of the United States with Pro-Pain and Voivod in late 1996, Waring left Crisis to focus on other commitments, including the upcoming birth of his child. The band subsequently played a few shows with Roy Mayorga prior to the tour, before enlisting Scott Bates of Gorgon. The band attempted to work with Bates on new material following the tour, but parted ways due to creative differences.

Karyn, Nasiruddeen and Wang were unsure of what Crisis should do without a drummer; they contemplated using a drum machine and launching a side project of "4-track experimental stuff" whilst they searched for a replacement. After agreeing to continue as a three-piece, the band recorded its third album, The Hollowing, utilizing a "human drum machine" devised by Nasiruddeen; Waring, Mayorga, Chris Hamilton and Jason Bittner performed drums on different tracks, allowing the band to experiment stylistically as they searched for a new, permanent drummer. Karyn credited this method with pulling Crisis out of a "really dark period" and providing the band with a creative spark. The album also features guest contributions from Norman Westberg of Swans and Sammy "Pierre" Duet of Acid Bath. Following its completion, Bittner joined Crisis full-time. The Hollowing was released in Europe on September 22, 1997, and in the United States on October 7 of that year. The band then toured Europe for the first time, supporting the Spudmonsters. Further touring of the US followed.

=== Transitional period and Skullsick Nation (1998–2002) ===
[In New York] we were selling out shows, we were headlining, we could book our tour pretty much anywhere on the east coast and mid west where ever we wanted to. But, labels weren't interested. They said we were too extreme, too weird, you don't have any marketability cause you have a woman. [...] we were like, that can't be possible because people come to our shows. So there's something out of sync there.

— Karyn Crisis

In 1998, Crisis split from Metal Blade Records, citing a lack of support. Afterwards, the band recorded a six-track demo with Keith Falgout and contributed "Methodology" (from Deathshead Extermination) and a cover of Twisted Sister's "Captain Howdy" to Dee Snider's Strangeland (1998). In December 1998, Crisis recruited Jwyanza Hobson as their second guitarist, allowing Nasiruddeen to "experiment with melodies while somebody else could keep the heaviness going". Karyn said the addition of Hobson allowed Wang to play more traditional basslines whilst the guitars did more "atmospheric and rhythmic stuff". In 1999, former Machine Head drummer Tony Costanza joined the band. Following a farewell tour around the area in late 1999, the members of Crisis relocated from New York City to Los Angeles in early 2000, citing a lack of support from record labels on the east coast of the US. If they could not find a record label, they planned to establish their own. Karyn said in contrast to when they were living in New York City and "literally starving for our art", the members of Crisis were able to "live more normal lives" in Los Angeles and "explore outside of [the band] with no expectations or demands".

Costanza did not like Los Angeles, and in March 2001, he quit Crisis to join Crowbar in New Orleans. Following his departure, the band began jamming and writing songs using a drum machine, resulting in their songs becoming more structured and stripped down. At the end of March, the band announced they had recruited a new drummer and had written four new songs. Karyn said that the increasing inability of Crisis' drummers after Waring—starting "most notably" with Costanza—to play the band's old songs or complex rhythms had caused the band's songwriting to "[travel] away from what we all considered to be a 'Crisis' sound." After firing its management and drummer, the members of Crisis decided to put the band on hold until they found a suitable drummer. In December 2001, Crisis changed their name to Skullsick Nation and added drummer Christopher Olivas to their lineup. "We couldn't play any songs like Crisis so we changed the name for the sake of the integrity of that music and Crisis", Karyn said in a 2004 interview.

Skullsick Nation's first show took place at the Troubador in Hollywood on January 4, 2002. The band played various shows around California from February to May 2002. In July, Karyn and Nasiruddeen performed as session guests on the debut album by Debris Inc., led by Ron Holzner of Trouble and Dave Chandler of St. Vitus. In September 2002, the band completed a three-song demo, Dead to the World, produced by Roy Mayorga. Although on reflection she considered the band's songs to be "a lot more boring and unexplorative" than Crisis, Karyn credited Skullsick Nation with helping Crisis with its songwriting; she said that it provided her with a "jump-start in getting me out of out my typical writing style". Nasiruddeen said that Skullsick Nation allowed Crisis to explore its melodic side, which they were unable to do during their time in New York City.

=== Like Sheep Led to Slaughter (2003–2005) ===
In December 2002, Crisis reverted to its original name and recruited drummer Marshall Kilpatric, formerly of Today is the Day. In March 2003, the band announced plans to record a new album with producer Billy Anderson in early June 2003. However, when Kilpatric failed to keep up with previously agreed deadlines for "reasons unknown to the band", Crisis parted ways with him in late April 2003 and recruited Josh Florian. In December 2003, Crisis signed a two-album deal with The End Records. In January 2004, the band finished recording its fourth and final album, Like Sheep Led to Slaughter. The album was released by The End and the band's own label, Children of Rage Records, on May 25, 2004. The band filmed music videos for "Blood Burden" and "Waking the Dead", which were both premiered on MTV2's Headbanger's Ball.

Following a set of performances around New York in April, Crisis toured the United States supporting Soulfly and Ill Niño from July 30 to September 17, 2004. From September 27 to November 10, 2004, Crisis toured with Kittie and Otep as part of the Metal Movement Tour. Two days before the tour was due to begin, Florian had to receive emergency appendix surgery, which Karyn attributed to his inability to handle the stress of touring; the band subsequently decided to continue without him. Waring returned to Crisis to play on the Metal Movement dates whilst the band searched for a replacement, although due to time contrainsts they were unable to teach him any of their new songs for the tour. In November 2004, the band announced plans to release a DVD, titled Signatures of Survival. The DVD was due to include footage of Crisis' first concert in 1993 and the recording of Like Sheep to Slaughter, along with bandmember interviews and other live recordings made by fans. Originally due for release in the spring of 2005, it was delayed to 2006 by The End Records.

In January 2005, Crisis announced Australian drummer Ryan Ball as Florian's replacement; however, the band would dismiss him after only three rehearsals in mid-February due to immigration issues and "the chaos of his personality". Two weeks after his dismissal, Ball was arrested in connection with an armed robbery in Pennsylvania. In February 2005, Crisis cancelled a planned tour with 3 Inches of Blood due to the birth of Gia Chuan Wang's daughter. In March, the band performed at the Independence-D festival in Japan and at the South by Southwest Music Festival (SXSW) in Austin, Texas with ex-Society 1 drummer Justin Arman. In April 2005, Crisis made Arman an official member of the band and began working on new material for their fifth album, which they expected to be completed in early 2006. In June 2005, Crisis opened for M.O.D. and Jacknife on the Killith Fair Tour across the United States. In September 2005, the band announced the departure of Wang due to family commitments; they planned to hold auditions for a new bassist in November. From October 1 to November 4, 2005, the band toured North America with Exodus and 3 Inches of Blood with bassist Nick Weitzel.

=== Indefinite hiatus (2006–present) ===
At the end of 2005, Karyn Crisis left Crisis and moved out of the Los Angeles area. On May 2, 2006, Crisis announced in a statement that they were going on an indefinite hiatus for unspecified reasons, after which its members would focus on their personal lives and other musical interests. The announcement left the fates of the band's fifth album, DVD and Children of Rage label uncertain. In an interview with Rocknworld shortly after the announcement, Karyn stated that the split was amicable and that "everybody [in Crisis] just decided to make their own personal decisions". Karyn left the music industry and did not sing or attend shows for a few years following Crisis' hiatus, citing her exhaustion in "trying to make it in music", problems with Crisis' booking agent and manager, and frustrations with being questioned about other, more successful female-fronted bands in interviews. She instead chose to focus on "other parts of [her] life", including painting and making leather designs.

In 2007, Nasiruddeen and Hobson formed The Angels Whispered Danger with Dan Kaufman and Nicky Bernardi of Eyes of Fire. Despite her initial reservations about returning to music, Karyn began working on a solo album in Italy in 2008 with Davide Tiso of Ephel Duath, with whom she would later marry. She also formed a new band, Good God, with Anderson, Aaron Gregory, Clay Powers and Iain Deaderick. In 2011, she became the vocalist for Ephel Duath. In 2014, Karyn and Tiso launched the doom metal band Karyn Crisis' Gospel of the Witches. In 2024, Nasiruddeen and Waring formed a new band, Master's Ashes, with former members of Voivod, White Zombie, Crowbar and the Convalescence.

== Musical style, influences and lyrics ==
Crisis have been described as avant-garde metal, death metal, and progressive metal. Karyn and Nasiruddeen both described the band's sound as "experimental metal". Largely defying categorization, the band were known for their "complex, layered music" and songwriting that drew upon various influences and styles, mixing elements from industrial music, hardcore, extreme metal, thrash metal, grindcore, avant-garde and noise music. Deathshead Extermination was primarily categorized as a death metal album; The Hollowing saw Crisis incorporate Middle Eastern elements into its sound, and was described as both "sludgier" and "more ominous" than its predecessor. As Skullsick Nation, Crisis transitioned to a more accessible version of its sound. Amy Sciarretto of CMJ New Music Report categorized the band's Dead to the World demo as rock 'n' roll and stoner rock. Like Sheep to Slaughter showcased an experimental metalcore sound. Karyn Crisis's vocals alternate between clean singing, screaming, growling, groaning, whispering, crooning, and squeaking; the intensity of her live performances led Crisis fans to nickname her the "Exorsister".

=== Influences ===
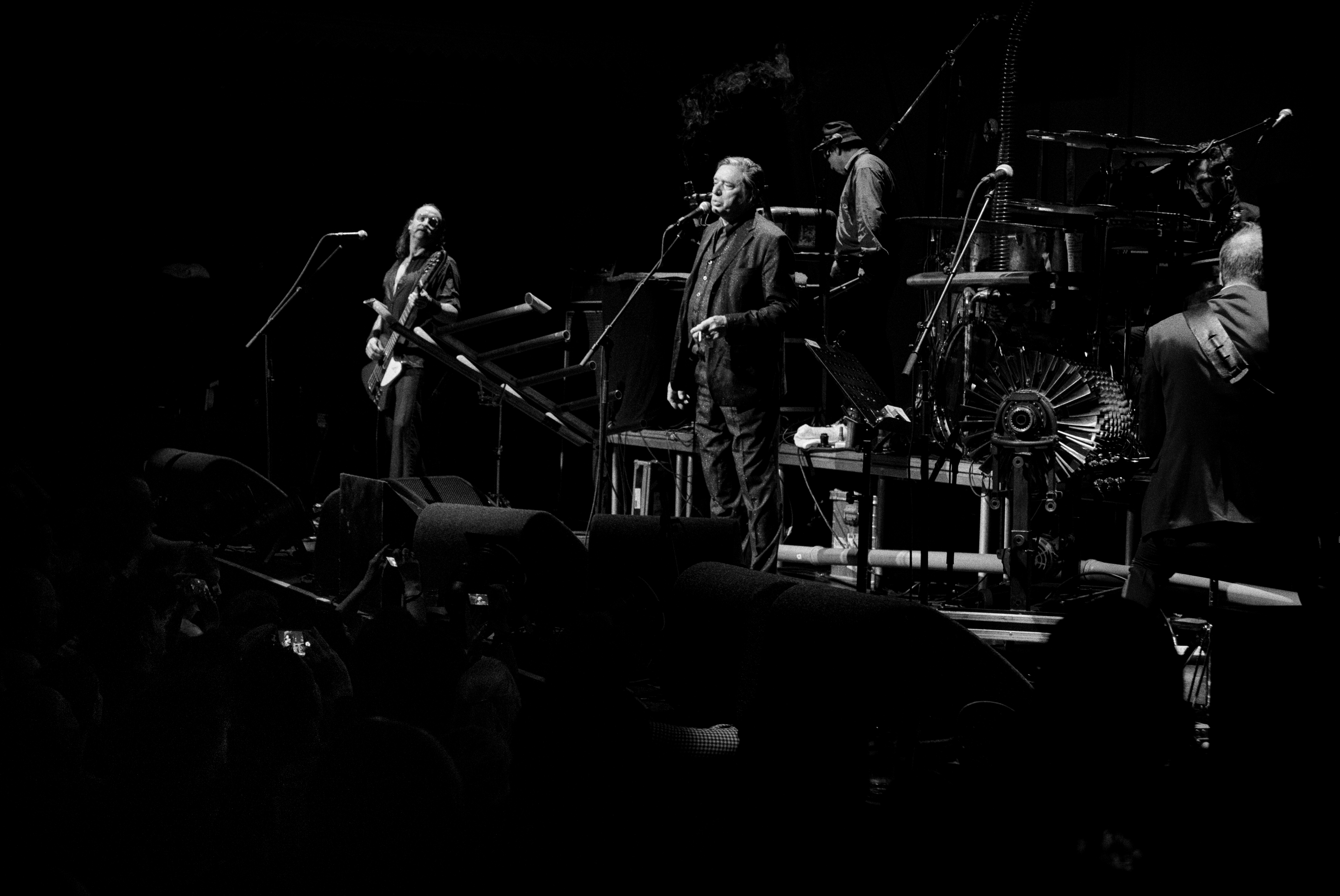
Einstürzende Neubauten (pictured) were an important influence on Crisis, influencing both its music and Karyn's vocal style.

Crisis was influenced by a variety of bands coming from each of its members' diverse backgrounds. Nasiruddeen, who is originally from Pakistan, grew up listening to Sufi devotional music. He lived in England from 1979 to 1981, where he was exposed to bands from the New Wave of British Heavy Metal including Iron Maiden, Motörhead and Diamond Head. After moving to Chicago in 1982, Nasiruddeen began listening to early industrial bands including Cabaret Voltaire and Swans; he also worked as a DJ playing industrial, post-punk, gothic and new wave music. Karyn has called Swans guitarist Norman Westberg, whom appears on Deathshead Extermination and The Hollowing, Nasiruddeen's "guitar hero". Karyn grew up playing piano and violin and classical music, and later got into pop and industrial music. She cited Björk, Cocteau Twins, Cranes, Diamanda Galas, Suzanne Vega, Sinéad O'Connor, the Sugarcubes, Siouxsie and the Banshees, Skinny Puppy and Z'EV as influences on her style. In a 1997 interview with Metal Maidens, she named Dax Riggs of Acid Bath as her favorite singer. The grandson of Fred Waring, founding drummer Fred Waring III studied under Steve Gadd and helped bring jazz influences into Crisis. Wang is a classically trained trombonist who cited death metal, Ministry, and Igor Stravinsky as influences. Hobson listed Black Sabbath and the Melvins as two of his favorite bands, and described Leeway as "inspirational" to him.

The German experimental music group Einstürzende Neubauten were an important influence on Crisis. In a 1996 interview with Metal Hammer Germany, Nasiruddeen described the group as a "significant influence" on the band's "organic" and formless approach to music. Karyn has called the band's third and fourth albums Halber Mensch (1985) and Fünf auf der nach oben offenen Richterskala (1987) the "two most important albums [she has] ever heard", crediting the performance of vocalist Blixa Bargeld on the latter album with "[opening] my eyes to a way of expressing my dark side". She also said that Crisis were "really into the whole Einstürzende Neubauten idea of destruction, if you tear down one building you can build up another one, and you can rebuild it even better, because you know a lot more about that building."

=== Lyrics ===
According to Joel McIver, Crisis "stood out thematically for their penchant for challenging lyrics that addressed personal and social issues with an unflinching zeal." Andrew Sample of Metal Maniacs described the lyrics of the band's Metal Blade Records albums as "apocalyptic [...] not just [in terms of] global apocalypse but personal and physical confrontations." Unlike the band's other albums, 8 Convulsions does not feature a unifying concept and was titled as such "because each song was a different convulsion", according to Nasiruddeen. Jesse Rutherford of Terrorizer described the album as a "bout of belligrence". In an interview with Lollipop Magazine, Karyn said that all of the songs on Deathshead Extermination deal with "decayed emotional state, or paranoia, or pure rage". The Hollowing was written about Karyn's past, and "fighting demons, capturing them or destroying them, and sailing them away and moving on". In Skullsick Nation, Karyn began writing about diversity and social issues in the United States; Like Sheep Led to Slaughter discusses topics such as war, control, abuse of power, fake histories, and rape.

In a 2005 interview with Peace Dog Man, Karyn outlined her lyric writing process:

[It's] something that starts of kind of cerebral. I'll get an idea based on a word or an image or a feeling and I take a journey with that idea. I'll dig through the dictionary, or the thesaurus, or art books and try to figure out where this idea came from in my head, and how to explore it to the fullest. In a song, you're using words as representatives for feelings or concepts and in sound. So, I really like that process. It's not an easy process, but I feel like there's a lot of power to certain word choices.

== Band members ==
Final lineup
- Karyn Crisis – vocals (1993–2005)
- Afzaal Nasiruddeen – guitar (1993–2006)
- Jwyanza Hobson – guitar (1998–2006)
- Justin Arman – drums (2005–2006)

Touring/session members

- Roy Mayorga – drums (touring 1996; session 1997)
- Chris Hamilton - drums (session; 1997)
- Nick Weitzel – bass (touring; 2005)
Past members
- Gia Chuan Wang – bass (1993–2005)
- Fred Waring III – drums (1993–1996; session 1997; touring 2004)
- Scott Bates – drums (1996–1997)
- Jason Bittner – drums (1997–1999)
- Tony Costanza – drums (1999–2001; died 2020)
- Christopher Olivas – drums (2001–2002)
- Marshall Kilpatric – drums (2002–2003)
- Joshua Florian – drums (2003–2004)

Timeline

== Discography ==
=== Studio albums ===
List of studio albums, with selected details
Title	Album details
8 Convulsions	Released: 1993; Label: Surge, Too Damn Hype; Format: CD, CS, LP, DD
Deathshead Extermination	Released: March 26, 1996; Label: Metal Blade; Format: CD, CS, DD
The Hollowing	Released: September 22, 1997; Label: Metal Blade; Format: CD, CS, DD
Like Sheep Led to Slaughter	Released: May 25, 2004; Label: The End, Children of Rage; Format: CD, DD

=== Music videos ===
List of music videos, with directors, showing year released along with albums
Title	Year	Director	Album
"Different Ways of Decay"	1996	Elana Columbo	Deathshead Extermination
"Blood Burden"	2004	Darren Doane	Like Sheep Led to Slaughter
"Waking the Dead" (version 1)	2004	N/A	Like Sheep Led to Slaughter
"Waking the Dead" (version 2)	2005	Nicole Phillips	Like Sheep Led to Slaughter
