= Guillermo Gonzales =

Italian singer, songwriter and musician (born 1976)

- Born: October 21, 1976 (age 48); Verona, Italy
- Genres: Grindcore, Death metal, Avant-garde, ambient, electronic, experimental, Psychedelic folk, Jazz, World music
- Occupation(s): Singer, songwriter, musician
- Instrument(s): vocals, piano, synthesiser, guitar, Shruti box
- Years active: 1994–present
- Labels: Urlo Music, Freecom, Kreative Klan, Earache

Guillermo Gonzales (born October 21, 1976) is an Italian singer, songwriter and musician.

== Biography ==
From 1994 to 2008, Gonzales was the frontman of the Italian extreme metal band Mothercare, especially known for their collaboration with Mark Greenway from Napalm Death and Mieszko Talarczyk from Nasum.

After leaving Mothercare in September 2008, two months later he was called by long-time friend Davide Tiso to substitute Luciano George Lorusso as Ephel Duath's vocalist, but this experience came to an end shortly, as the band parted ways with their long-time label Earache in 2009.

Since 2012, he has been running several musical projects with Italian virtuoso percussionist Sbibu, spanning from jazz to prog rock and from ethnic music to experimental music, collaborating with a vast range of musicians.

In 2014, he joined, as second vocalist, Premio Tenco SIAE Award winners Farabrutto. a psychedelic folk-rock band where Sbibu plays the ground drums.

== Discography ==
=== Mothercare ===
Sources

- 1998 – In a Hole (demo EP)
- 2000 – Fusoku no Kigen
- 2003 – Breathing Instructions
- 2005 – Traumaturgic

=== Mugen ===
- 2012 – Mugen (self-produced)

=== Perfect Pair ===
- 2017 - Perfect Pair

=== Submarine Silence ===
- 2016 - Journey Through Mine
- Oct/Nov 2020 - Did Swans Ever See God?

=== Tarkampa ===
- 2017 - Tres Ritus Marins

=== Guest ===
- 2007 - Mainline - Empathize with your Enemies (guest vocals)
- 2010 - Blame - My Epitaph (Instinct Extinct) (guest vocals)
- 2015 - Mothercare - Chronicles of Ordinary Hatred (guest vocals on "Relics", Nasum's cover)
