= Metridium Fields =

Studio album by Giant Squid
- Released: August 22, 2006
- Recorded: 2005–2006
- Genre: Doom metal Post-metal; Progressive metal
- Length: 60:25
- Label: The End Records
- Producer: Jason Sewell

Giant Squid chronology
Monster in the Creek (2005)	Metridium Fields (2006)	The Ichthyologist (2009)

Professional ratings
Review scores
Source	Rating
Allmusic	link
UltimateMetal.com	link
PopMatters	link
Deaf Sparrow	link

Metridium Fields is the major label debut by San Francisco-based doom metal outfit Giant Squid. It is a re-recorded version of their album Metridium Field, which was released independently by the band two years earlier.

The band's original debut album, Metridium Field was self-released in 2004, and after signing with The End Records in 2005, the band decided to remaster the album for its world-wide release. Upon finding the original master tracks had become unusable, Giant Squid re-recorded the entire album and re-released it as their major label debut and first "official" album. Fields was released on August 22, 2006, and brought the band critical acclaim and a devoted fanbase.

The title of the album and its closing track is named for Metridium, a genus of sea anemone.

== Artwork ==
The painting depicted in the album cover is Watson and the Shark by John Singleton Copley.

== Track listing ==
=== Metridium Field ===
No.	Title	Length
1.	"Megaptera in the Delta"	0:51
2.	"Neonate"	6:37
3.	"Versus the Siren"	8:30
4.	"Ampullae of Lorenzini"	7:12
5.	"Summit"	6:41
6.	"Eating Machine"	0:54
7.	"Revolution in the Water"	5:09
8.	"Metridium Field"	16:32
Total length:		52:26

=== Metridium Fields ===
No.	Title	Length
1.	"Megaptera in the Delta"	0:50
2.	"Neonate"	6:39
3.	"Versus the Siren"	9:24
4.	"Ampullae of Lorenzini"	9:16
5.	"Summit"	6:39
6.	"Eating Machine"	0:55
7.	"Revolution in the Water"	5:33
8.	"Metridium Field"	21:09
Total length:		60:35

== Personnel ==
- Aurielle Gregory – vocals, guitar, banjo, Juno 106, Prophet 600, Moog Opus
- Aaron Gregory – vocals, guitar, banjo, theremin
- Bryan Beeson – bass
- Michael Conroy – drums
- Tim Conroy – trumpet
