= The Hollowing (album) =

Studio album by Crisis
- Released: September 22, 1997
- Recorded: May–June 1997
- Studios: Excello (New York City); Festival Recording (New Orleans)
- Length: 55:23
- Label: Metal Blade
- Producers: Steve McAllister; Keith Falgout; Crisis

Crisis chronology
| Deathshead Extermination (1996) | The Hollowing (1997) | Like Sheep Led to Slaughter (2004) |

Professional ratings
Review scores
| Source | Rating |
|---|---|
| AllMusic | 4/5 stars |
| Chronicles of Chaos | 6/10 |
| Collector's Guide to Heavy Metal | 6/10 |
| The Grand Rapids Press | 3.5/4 stars |
| Juice | 8/10 |
| Kerrang! | 4/5 stars |
| Rock Hard | 7.5/10 |
| Terrorizer | 4.5/5 stars |

The Hollowing is the third studio album by American heavy metal band Crisis, released on September 22, 1997, by Metal Blade Records.

== Track listing ==
All lyrics are written by Karyn Crisis; all music is composed by Afzaal Nasiruddeen and Gia Chuan Wang.

| No. | Title | Length |
|---|---|---|
| 1. | "Mechanical Man" | 3:15 |
| 2. | "In the Shadow of the Sun" | 6:57 |
| 3. | "Fire of Sorrow" | 6:31 |
| 4. | "Vision and the Verity" | 4:32 |
| 5. | "Kingdom's End" | 4:51 |
| 6. | "After the Flood" | 2:48 |
| 7. | "Sleeping the Wicked" | 3:14 |
| 8. | "Surviving the Siren" | 6:44 |
| 9. | "Take the Low Road" | 2:35 |
| 10. | "Discipline of Degradation" | 5:10 |
| 11. | "Come to Light" | 8:42 |
| Total length: | | 55:23 |

== Personnel ==
Adapted from liner notes.

Crisis
- Karyn Crisis - vocals
- Afzaal Nasiruddeen - guitar
- Gia Chuan Wang - bass

Additional personnel

- Fred Waring III - drums (1, 2, 4, 11)
- Roy Mayorga - drums (3, 8)
- Jason Bittner - drums (6, 7, 10)
- Chris Hamilton - drums (5, 6, 9)
- Norman Westberg - vomit guitar (1, 3, 11)
- Sammy "Pierre" Duet - backing vocals (8, 10)
Production
- Steve McAllister - production, recording, mixing (1–5, 7–11)
- Keith Falgout - co-production, recording, mixing (6)

Artwork

- Karyn Crisis - cover art models, photography, CD tray, band photo
- Gabe Mera - layout and design
- Richard Hobbs - group photo
- Steve Golembowski - live photos
