= Deathshead Extermination =

Studio album by Crisis
- Released: March 26, 1996
- Recorded: October 1995
- Studio: Smash (New York City)
- Genres: Death metal; heavy metal; thrash metal
- Length: 50:30
- Label: Metal Blade
- Producers: Steve McAllister; Afzaal Nasiruddeen

Crisis chronology
8 Convulsions (1993)	Deathshead Extermination (1996)	The Hollowing (1997)

Professional ratings
Review scores
Source	Rating
AllMusic	3/5 stars
Collector's Guide to Heavy Metal	6/10
Hit Parader	1/5 stars
Kerrang!	2/5 stars
Metal Hammer (Germany)	6/7
Rock Hard	7.5/10

Deathshead Extermination is the second studio album by American heavy metal band Crisis, released on March 26, 1996, by Metal Blade Records.

== Track listing ==
All lyrics are written by Karyn Crisis; all music is composed by Crisis.

No.	Title	Length
1.	"Onslaught"	2:06
2.	"Working Out the Graves"	5:13
3.	"Wretched"	3:41
4.	"The Watcher"	3:57
5.	"Deadfall"	3:40
6.	"Methodology"	7:44
7.	"Bloodlines"	3:36
8.	"Nowhere But Lost"	4:31
9.	"Different Ways of Decay"	2:50
10.	"Prisoner Scavenger"	4:22
11.	"2 Minutes Hate"	4:17
12.	"Aftermath"	4:26
Total length:		50:30

== Personnel ==
Adapted from liner notes.

Crisis

- Karyn Crisis - vocals
- Afzaal Nasiruddeen - guitar
- Gia Chuan Wang - bass
- Fred Waring III - drums

Additional personnel

- Norman Westberg - additional guitar (4)
- The Monkey Butt Sex Choir (Iann, Josh, Christian, Nasiruddeen) - backing vocals (11)

Production

- Steve McAllister - production, engineering
- Mike Mohney - assistant engineer
- Jeff Coplan - assistant engineer
- Mike Lopresti - assistant engineer
- Joe West - assistant engineer

Artwork

- Karyn Crisis - photos, illustrations
- Afzaal Nasiruddeen - layout, typography
- Richard Hobbs - band photos
- Pete Tsakris - additional graphic help
- Manray - front cover model
