= Monster in the Creek =

EP by Giant Squid
- Released: 2005
- Recorded: Hangar Recording Studio
- Genre: Doom metal Post-metal; Progressive metal
- Length: 34:43
- Label: Tyrannosaurus Records
- Producer: Giant Squid

Giant Squid chronology
Metridium Field (2004)	Monster in the Creek (2005)	Metridium Fields (2006)

Monster in the Creek is the first EP and second release by post-metal band Giant Squid. Many songs are about the Jersey Shore shark attacks of 1916.

== Track listing ==
1. "Monster in the Creek" – 7:10
2. "Dead Man's Fog" – 5:55
3. "Age of Accountability" – 6:45
4. "Throwing a Donner Party" – 5:22
5. "Dare We Ask the Widow" – 6:04
6. "Lester Stillwell" – 3:27

== Personnel ==
- Aaron Gregory – vocals, guitar
- Aurielle Gregory – guitar
- Bryan Beeson – bass guitar
- Andy Southard – keyboards, vocals
- Mike Conroy – drums
