= Like Sheep Led to Slaughter =

Studio album by Crisis
- Released: May 25, 2004
- Recorded: September 11–20, 2003; January 21–26, 2004
- Studio: Desert Moon (Anaheim)
- Genre: Avant-garde metal; metalcore
- Length: 46:43
- Label: The End; Children of Rage
- Producer: Billy Anderson; Crisis

Crisis chronology
The Hollowing (1997)	Like Sheep Led to Slaughter (2004)

Professional ratings
Review scores
Source	Rating
AllMusic	4/5 stars
Brave Words & Bloody Knuckles	7/10
Collector's Guide to Heavy Metal	7/10
Metal.de	7/10
Metal Hammer	7/10
Rock Hard	8/10
The Salt Lake Tribune	A
Terrorizer	8.5/10

Like Sheep Led to Slaughter is the fourth and final studio album by American heavy metal band Crisis, released on May 25, 2004, through The End and Children of Rage Records. Produced and recorded by Billy Anderson at Desert Moon Studios in Anaheim, California, it was the band's first album in seven years and only release as a quintet, featuring second guitarist Jwyanza Hobson and drummer Josh Florian.

Music videos were produced for "Blood Burden" and "Waking the Dead".

== Track listing ==
All lyrics are written by Karyn Crisis; all music is composed by Crisis.

No.	Title	Length
1.	"Omen"	0:54
2.	"Waking the Dead"	3:09
3.	"A Graveyard for Bitches"	4:53
4.	"Nomad"	4:52
5.	"Politics of Domination"	4:30
6.	"Blood Burden"	2:58
7.	"Rats in a Maze"	1:17
8.	"Secrets of the Prison House"	6:37
9.	"Corpus Apocalypse"	4:32
10.	"Study in Cancer"	3:55
11.	"Exit Catacombs"	5:27
12.	"The Fate"	3:35
Total length:		46:43

== Personnel ==
Adapted from liner notes.

Crisis
- Karyn Crisis - vocals
- Afzaal Nasiruddeen - guitar
- Jwyanza Hobson - guitar
- Gia Chuan Wang - bass
- Josh Florian - drums

Additional personnel

- Steve Borek - sitar (4, 12)
- Billy Anderson - chorus backing vocals (9)
- Daniel Dismal - guest vocals (10)
Production
- Billy Anderson - production, recording, mixing (at Desert Moon Studios)
- Patrick Miller - additional engineering
- Josh Florian - mastering (at The Mastering Lab, Hollywood)

Artwork

- Karyn Crisis - artwork, photographs, layout, concept, spine sculpture
- Afzaal Nasiruddeen - cover and "Omen" photographs assistance
- Steve Conard - graphic manipulations, final layout, web graphics and concepts
- Paul Chacon - knives
