= Rephormula =

Phormula
- original release

Studio album by Ephel Duath
- Released: May 2000
- Recorded: Fear Studio in Ravenna, Italy
- Genre: Experimental metal, black metal
- Length: 42:35
- Label: Code666
- Producer: Ephel Duath

Ephel Duath chronology
Phormula (2000)	Phormula (2000)	The Painter's Palette (2003)

Alternative cover
- re-release

Phormula is the full-length debut studio album by the Italian band Ephel Duath. Originally released through Code666 label in early 2000, the album was reissued two years later by Earache's sub-label Elitist. Bonus tracks on the reissue were three songs from the 1998 demo Opera and two remixes; this release was re-titled as Rephormula.

At the time, Ephel Duath consisted of Giuliano Mogicato and Davide Tiso, both playing guitar, accompanied by synthesizers and programmed drums. Mogicato was the main composer of the album, but both members of Ephel Duath added their ideas to the arrangements, with influences from old Norwegian black metal mixed with electronic music.

== Background ==
Ephel Duath was formed in Padova, Veneto, in February 1998, initially as a studio project, by the duo of Davide Tiso (vocals, guitar) and Giuliano Mogicato (vocals, guitar, bass, keyboards and drum machine). The project debuted in October that same year with the demo Opera. This recording sold over 1,000 copies and topped MP3.com's heavy metal charts with over 20,000 free downloads, which drew attention of the newly founded Italian label Code666 who signed the band in late 1999. The duo recorded and mixed the album at Fear Studio in Ravenna, Italy. Phormula was released in May 2000 and was well-received by critics, who generally praised the creativity of musicians as well as their experimental combination of electronic music and extreme metal. However, this success did not prevent the departure of Giuliano Mogicato in June 2001. In a 2008 interview with Avantgarde-metal.com, Davide Tiso discussed the departure of Mogicato:

We have been a great communion for a lot of years, but after the Phormula recording session, my bandmate Giuliano [Mogicato] became completely confused regarding the [sic] Ephel Duath’s future. He wanted to move the new sound to some "anti-metal" form; Ephel Duath in his conception would be an instrumental band with percussion, cello and others acoustic instruments. I preferred to continue alone, because I thought he would destroy the spirit of the band.

Later in 2001, the Code7 agency (a division of the Code666 label) sent the band to sign a four-album deal with Elitist Records, a sub-label of Earache Records. In early 2002, Earache/Elitist decided to re-release Phormula, adding two remixed songs and a sampling of Ephel Duath's original demo, 1998's Opera, as bonus tracks, and changed the title to Rephormula.

== Style and influences ==
The music on Phormula, including that of the bonus tracks on Rephormula, was mainly written by Giuliano Mogicato, then the band's main composer. The band's ideas and arrangements have been influenced by the raw sound of the older era Emperor and Limbonic Art, but incorporated dark, gothic, and avant-garde musical elements in the songs' structures. In a 2002 interview with webzine Chronicles of Chaos, Davide Tiso stated that Ephel Duath compositions are made in a "very spontaneous" way, and noting the band's complex arrangements, he added: "It just flows from within us. We [Davide Tiso and Giuliano Mogicato] love to have spontaneity with what we do, a lot of it comes from the initial guitar lines that act as a skeleton for the song at hand. [...] We try to keep our ideas very open to every style of influence and bring that somehow into what we do."

== Reception ==
Professional ratings
Review scores
Source	Rating
Allmusic	4/5 stars
Chronicles of Chaos	(8/10)
Negura	(8/10)

Phormula and Rephormula received generally positive reviews. A writer in the Romanian magazine Negura said, "It's full of magic and mystery and you can sense there’s a whole (alchemic) process going on at the same beside the music." Jason Taylor of Allmusic said that the album "is certainly one of the most intriguing black metal albums to be released." He also praised the reissue as a "welcome introduction" to the duo's music. The webzine Chronicles of Chaos praised the album's tempo as "simultaneously innovative and enjoyable." Stylus Magazine reviewer Cosmo Lee stated that Phormula "ran Norwegian black metal through a funhouse of electronics and demented wackiness." Regarding the use of a drum machine, critics were of different opinions; Pedro Azevedo of Chronicles of Chaos considered it "well used [...] despite some less than perfect passages", while Negura's writer saw what he called "electronic drums" (a drum machine was used) as the only negative aspect of the album.

== Track listing ==
All tracks are written by Ephel Duath.

Phormula (2000)
No.	Title	Length
1.	"Embossed"	3:55
2.	"The Greyness Grows Already Old"	5:18
3.	"Danza"	5:36
4.	"A Flickering Warmth"	6:27
5.	"Myriad"	2:13
6.	"Pursuing the Instinct"	7:12
7.	"The Blows's Rhymer"	5:39
8.	"Elapsed"	6:17
Total length:		42:41

Rephormula (2002)
No.	Title	Length
1.	"The Embossed"	3:53
2.	"Greynesses Grow Already Old"	5:17
3.	"The Danza"	5:34
4.	"The Flickering Warmth"	6:26
5.	"Myriads"	2:12
6.	"Phormula"	7:12
7.	"The Blow's Rhymers"	5:37
8.	"Insomnia's Desert"	6:04
9.	"Embossed (On the Corpse)" (The Embossed Remix by Homo Homini Loops)	5:06
10.	"Instinkt" (Phormula Remix by Paso)	4:32
11.	"Opera I" (Demo Tape Opera)	8:06
12.	"Adulta Hleme: The Magnificence" (Demo Tape Opera)	7:20
13.	"Falling..." (Demo Tape Opera)	5:54
Total length:		73:19

== Personnel ==
Performers

- Giuliano Mogicato – bass, guitar, synthesizer, vocals, programming
- Davide Tiso – guitar, synthesizer, vocals, photography

Production

- Antonio Morgante – engineer, mixing, mastering
- Giorgio Spolaor – engineer, mixing, mastering
- Gabry – engineer, mixing
- Paso – engineer, mixing, remixing
- Tim Turan – mastering, remastering
- Tomàs Bican – photography
- Peppe – artwork
