= The Ichthyologist =

Studio album by Giant Squid
- Released: February 3, 2009; August 13, 2009 (Translation Loss re-release)
- Recorded: August 2008
- Genre: Doom metal Post-metal; Progressive metal
- Length: 63:48
- Label: Independent; Transition Loss Records
- Producer: Matt Bayles

Giant Squid chronology
Metridium Fields (2006)	The Ichthyologist (2009)	Cenotes (2011)

Professional ratings
Review scores
Source	Rating
blabbermouth.net	link
Music Street Journal	(positive) link
Sputnikmusic	link
Metal Review	link

The Ichthyologist is the third studio album by post-metal band Giant Squid. It was released on February 3, 2009, independently by the band, limited to 1,000 copies in special packaging. The first 50 pre-orders also include a real Broadnose sevengill shark tooth collected by singer Aaron Gregory from the large tunnel tanks at Aquarium of the Bay at San Francisco, California, where he worked at the time as a professional scuba diver. Fans started receiving pre-orders in late January 2009.

The album is a concept album about a man stripped of humanity and left alone with nothing but the sea in front of him. He adapts in inhuman ways to survive the shock of human loss and total emotional tragedy, becoming something else entirely in the process. It has been greatly implied that these adaptations were in the form of transformation into a marine seastar like mutation, adopting their abilities of regeneration, and strange anatomic features, such as possessing two stomachs, and light sensing eye-like organs on the tips of their appendages. This story line was continued in the follow-up 2011 EP, Cenotes, and is hinted at in the 2014 release, Minoans.

The album was re-released on Translation Loss Records featuring four completely re-mixed songs as well as new artwork by Sam Kieth.

== Track listing ==
1. Panthalassa (Lampetra tridentata) – 5:50
2. La Brea Tar Pits (Pseudomonas putida) – 7:28
3. Sutterville (Vibrio cholerae) – 4:08
4. Dead Man Slough (Pacifastacus leniusculus) – 5:33
5. Throwing a Donner Party at Sea (Physeter catodon) ft. Karyn Crisis – 5:40
6. Sevengill (Notorynchus cepedianus) ft. Anneke van Giersbergen, Lorraine Rath – 7:10
7. Mormon Island (Alluvial Au) ft. Kris Force – 6:39
8. Blue Linckia (Linckia laevigata) – 7:13
9. Emerald Bay (Prionace glauca) ft. Cat Gratz – 6:11
10. Rubicon Wall (Acipenser transmontanus) – 7:59

== Personnel ==
- Aaron Gregory – vocals, guitar, banjo, keyboards
- Jackie Perez Gratz – cello, vocals
- Bryan Beeson – bass
- Chris Lyman – drums

=== Guest musicians ===
- Karyn Crisis – vocals
- Anneke Van Giersbergen – vocals
- Kris Force – violin
- Nate Perkins – trumpet
- Cat Gratz – oboe
- Lorraine Rath – flute
