= Pain Necessary to Know =

Studio album by Ephel Duath
- Released: 2005
- Recorded: Between February and June 2005 at Studio 73, Ravenna, Italy
- Genre: Avant-garde metal Jazz fusion
- Length: 45:47
- Label: Earache (MOSH918)
- Producer: Riccardo Pasini

Ephel Duath chronology
The Painter's Palette (2003)	Pain Necessary to Know (2005)	Pain Remixes the Known (2007)

Pain Necessary to Know is the third studio album by the Italian avant-garde metal band Ephel Duath. The album was observed to be another departure for the band, with Ciaran Tracey noting in Terrorizer that "its sheer difference in the hugely tangential path Ephel Duath have taken from everything done hitherto, even in terms of their own varied and colourful palette". Tracey further observed that the band's previous "multiple personality disorder seems to have been replaced by a bipolar schizophrenia, with the numerous faces of past work having been cast aside in favour of two basic protagonists: explosive rage and light jazz".

Cosmo Lee similarly remarked in Stylus Magazine that

Rare is the album that defies comprehension after many listens; rarer still is the album that does so, not out of incoherence, but out of design. Ephel Duath guitarist and mastermind Davide Tiso says, "Repetition is comfortable for the audience. It kills the shocking side of the real innovation." His band's latest album, Pain Necessary to Know, avoids repetition like the plague. Inspired by his new hometown, Venice, Tiso has created 39 minutes of continually changing "liquid music." According to Tiso, the album offers "a constant sense of anxiety, a fluctuating idea of controlled chaos." Those discomfited by comfort will find much to enjoy here.

== Reception ==
Professional ratings
Review scores
Source	Rating
Allmusic	1.5/5 stars
Stylus Magazine	B+
Terrorizer	8.5/10

Ciaran Tracey commented in Terrorizer that the album was "at times wholly random in its obtuse jazz meandering and violently extreme ejaculations" yet it "perfectly conjures the fug, the smell and the bleeding of saturated colour into black sky that makes our nocturnal city lives the unsavoury and sometimes downright dangerous places they are".

== Track listing ==
1. "New Disorder" – 5:01
2. "Vector (Third Movement)" – 4:15
3. "Pleonasm" – 2:31
4. "Few Stars, No Refrain And A Cigarette" – 3:43
5. "Crystalline Whirl" – 4:51
6. "I Killed Rebecca" – 5:23
7. "Vector" – 4:17
8. "Vector (Second Movement)" – 3:02
9. "Imploding" – 5:10

== Personnel ==
- Luciano Lorusso George — Vocals
- Fabio Fecchio — Bass
- Davide Tiso — Guitars and spare time instruments
- Riccardo Pasini — Synths and manipulations
- Davide Piovesan - Drums
