= The Painter's Palette =

Studio album by Ephel Duath
- Released: June 17, 2003
- Recorded: May – October 2002 at Fear Studio and Studio 73 in Ravenna, Italy
- Genre: Avant-garde metal Hardcore punk Jazz fusion
- Length: 46:33
- Label: Earache
- Producer: Paso

Ephel Duath chronology
Rephormula (2002)	The Painter's Palette (2003)	Pain Necessary to Know (2005)

Professional ratings
Review scores
Source	Rating
Allmusic	4/5 stars
Sputnikmusic	(4/5)
Kerrang!	(5/5)

The Painter's Palette is the second album by Italian avant-garde metal / jazz band Ephel Duath.

== Track listing ==
1. "The Passage (Pearl Grey)" - 4:11
2. "The Unpoetic Circle (Bottle Green)" - 4:54
3. "Labyrinthine (Crimson)" - 5:21
4. "Praha (Ancient Gold)" - 5:17
5. "The Picture (Bordeaux)" - 4:52
6. "Ruins (Deep Blue and Violet)" - 4:56
7. "Ironical Communion (Amber)" - 5:28
8. "My Glassy Shelter (Dirty White)" - 4:46
9. "The Other's Touch (Amaranth)" - 6:44

== Personnel ==
=== Performers ===
- Ephel Duath – arranger, sampling
  - Davide Tolomei – clean vocals
  - Luciano Lorusso George – unclean vocals
  - Davide Tiso – guitar, lyrics
  - Fabio Fecchio – bass
  - Davide Piovesan – drums
- Maurizio Scomparin – trumpet

=== Production ===
- Riccardo "Paso" Pasini – arranger, synthesizer, noise, structures, producer
- Gabriele Ravaglia – assistant
- Gianni Gamberini – assistant
- Federico Tanzi – assistant
- Twan Sibon – CD-ROM design
- Matteo Pizzimenti – photography
