= Ephel Duath (band) =

Italian punk band

- Origin: Padua, Italy
- Genres: Avant-garde metal; progressive metal; hardcore punk; jazz fusion
- Years active: 1998–2014
- Labels: Code666; Earache; Agonia
- Spinoffs: Karyn Crisis' Gospel of the Witches
- Past members: Davide Tiso; Karyn Crisis; Bryan Beller; Marco Minnemann; Fabio Fecchio; Riccardo Pasini; Davide Piovesan; Davide Tolomei; Giuliano Mogicato; Sergio Ponti; Luciano George Lorusso; Guillermo Gonzales; Andrea Rabuini

Ephel Duath was an Italian avant garde metal/hardcore punk band, formed in 1998 in Padua. They had a changing line-up. Guitarist and songwriter Davide Tiso was the only constant member. They released one demo, five studio albums, and two remix albums. Their most recent studio album, Hemmed By Light, Shaped By Darkness, was released in 2013.

== History ==
Ephel Duath was formed in 1998 as a duo. They took their name from the fictional mountain range in J.R.R. Tolkien's book The Lord of the Rings. Their debut release was Phormula, on Code666. Following Phormula's release, they signed to Elitist Records (a sub-division of Earache), and repackaged the debut with three tracks from the 1998 demo, Opera, and two remixes. The album was released in 2001 as Rephormula.

Founder Davide Tiso recruited diverse musicians with backgrounds in hardcore punk, progressive rock, jazz, blues, funk and pop. The first album with this lineup was 2003's The Painter's Palette. The album combined hardcore punk and jazz fusion.

A new album, Pain Necessary to Know, was released in late 2005. After recording the album, drummer Davide Piovesan quit the band and was replaced with Sergio Ponti in 2006 and then Andrea Rabuini in 2007. On November 27, 2008, Luciano George Lorusso quit the band and was replaced with Guillermo Gonzales. They released the song "Guardian" on their MySpace.

In January 2009, Ephel Duath released Through My Dog's Eyes, featuring drummer Marco Minnemann and Dillinger Escape Plan's Ben Weinman. Weinman composed "electronics" on the song "Bark Loud". On June 4, 2009, Davide Tiso announced that Ephel Duath had left Earache Records and that he was "thrilled" to be off the label.

From the band's departure from Earache until late 2011, Tiso was the sole member of Ephel Duath. He explained that this was due to the cost of hiring musicians out of his own pocket. He claimed to have received only $400 from his record label. Regarding how the financial difficulties affected the band, Tiso said that the former members of Ephel Duath "were often complaining, without even realizing how many problems I was hiding in front of their eyes. Now it's just me, and I'm pretty comfortable like this."

In November 2011, Tiso announced (via Facebook) that Ephel Duath signed with Agonia Records (Poland) for the release of an EP and two full-length albums. The EP, called On Death And Cosmos, was recorded in January 2012 at Sharkbyte Studios in Oakland, California, and released in summer 2012. Erik Rutan mixed the album at his Mana Recording Studio and Alan Douches mastered it at West West Side Music in New York. In December 2011, a new line-up was announced consisting of Karyn Crisis (Tiso's wife), Steve Di Giorgio and Marco Minnemann (who has previously worked with the band).

The band completed their fifth full-length album, Hemmed By Light, Shaped By Darkness, again with producer Erik Rutan at Mana Recording Studios, and released it in late 2013. The black and white cover artwork was completed by artists Dehn Sora and Aeron Alfrey.

In December 2014, front man Davide Tiso announced the end of Ephel Duath.

== Members ==
=== Final Lineup ===
- Davide Tiso – guitar, bass, keyboards, backing vocals (1998–2014)
- Karyn Crisis - vocals (2011–2014)
- Bryan Beller - bass (2012–2014)
- Marco Minnemann - drums (2008–2009, 2011–2014)

=== Former members ===
- Demetrio Scopelliti - live guitar (2012–2014)
- Giuliano Mogicato – vocals, bass, guitar, keyboards (1998–2002)
- Davide Tolomei – vocals (2003–2004)
- Davide Piovesan – drums (2003–2005)
- Fabio Fecchio – bass (2003–2006)
- Riccardo Pasini – keyboards (2003–2005)
- Sergio Ponti – drums (2006–2007)
- Luciano George Lorusso – vocals (2003–2008)
- Guillermo Gonzales - vocals (2008–2009)
- Andrea Rabuini – live drums (2007–2009)
- Steve Di Giorgio - bass (2011–2012)

== Discography ==
=== Demo albums ===
- Opera (1998)

=== Studio albums ===
- Phormula (2000)
- Rephormula (2002)
- The Painter's Palette (2003)
- Pain Necessary to Know (2005)
- Through My Dog's Eyes (2009)
- Hemmed By Light, Shaped By Darkness (2013)

=== Extended plays ===
- On Death and Cosmos (2012)

=== Remix albums ===
- Pain Remixes the Known (2007)

=== Singles and Music Videos ===
- The Embossed (2002)
- The Passage (2003)
